= NHRA Winternationals =

Annual drag racing event

Winternationals
National Hot Rod Association
- Venue: In-N-Out Burger Pomona Dragstrip
- Location: Pomona, California, U.S. 34°05′42.32″N 117°46′11.15″W
- Corporate sponsor: Lucas Oil
- First race: 1960

Circuit information
- Surface: Concrete
- Length: 1/4 mi (0.40 km)

The NHRA Winternationals (commonly called the Winternats) is an annual drag racing event that is held by the National Hot Rod Association (NHRA) at In-N-Out Burger Pomona Dragstrip in Pomona, California each year.

== History ==
The National Hot Rod Association first sanctioned a Winter Nationals in 1960 at Bunnell-Flagler Field at Daytona Beach, Florida. The event was co-sanctioned with NASCAR (a member of the Automobile Competition Committee for the United States, the national governing body of motorsport that replaced the AAA Contest Board in 1956 along with USAC and SCCA; the NHRA was not then a member of) in order to gain national ACCUS and international FIA sanctioning. NHRA does not now recognize the event as the first Winternats.

It was held the week before the 1960 Daytona 500, and was the attempt to solve problems with illegal street racing at Daytona during Speed Weeks. Wally Parks and George Schorb worked with the South Florida Timing Association and NASCAR official Ed Otto. Schorb worked to help stop illegal street racing first in Miami. Until the 2020 season, the race was usually held in early February, often the week after the Super Bowl.

The event moved to the Los Angeles area in 1961. In 1962, under pressure from Peggy Hart (wife of track owner "Pappy" Hart) and Mickey Thompson, as well as fellow racers Shirley Shahan and Roberta Leighton, Carol Cox was the first woman allowed to race at an NHRA national event. Cox drove a 1961 Pontiac Ventura with a 348 cu in (5,700 cc) V8, which was driven (not trailered) to Pomona. Cox won the title in S/SA, making her the first woman ever to take a win at an NHRA national event; the 9 March 1962 issue of National Dragster recorded her as a "crowd favorite", with a winning pass of 13.06 seconds at 107.65 mph (173.25 km/h), but says nothing about it being a first for a woman, dismissively calling her a "'powder puff' handler". Some racers believe a class win is more difficult to achieve than a handicap (eliminator) win.

The 1965 event, in round one of B/FD, hosted the first ever side-by-side Funny Car showdown, between Jack Chrisman and Don Gay; Gay won when Chrisman redlighted.

At the 1966 event, Shahan was the first woman to claim a national event eliminator crown, by taking Stock Eliminator. The win put her on the cover of National Dragster.

NHRA debuted the new Top Fuel Funny Car (TF/FC) class at the Winternationals in 1969; Funny Car Eliminator (FCE) would be won by Clare Sanders, teammate of "Jungle Jim" Liberman.

In 1970, Top Fuel Eliminator (quickset fuel car of the meet, digger or flopper) went to Larry Dixon Sr.

The AA/FC winner was the 1970 Dodge Charger, Hawaiian, of Larry Reyes (driving for Roland Leong). Barrie Poole became the first Canadian to win an NHRA national event, taking the 1970 Super Stock title.

The Funny Car Eliminator title at the 1971 Winternats would go to Leong's Hawaiian. with Butch Maas at the wheel. Don Garlits' novel rear-engined dragster appeared at the Winternats that year, qualifying with 6.8; his best time of the meet was a 6.70, over Jim Dunn's 7.58, in the semi-final: Garlits would win, when Kenny Safford broke in the final. The last Top Gas Eliminator crown, before NHRA abolished the class, went to Walt Stevens, at the wheel of Ken Theiss' twin-engined Odd Couple TG/D. The year's award for Best Engineered Car went to Jim Busby, with a dragster powered by a pair of injected 255 cu in (4,179 cc) DOHC Ford Indy V8 engines. (Hank Westmoreland failed to qualify the car, and it never ran again.) Canadian Barrie Poole repeated his 1970 Winternats win in Super Stock, in a Sandy Elliot Mustang. Don Enriquez (in Gene Adams' A/FD) won Competition Eliminator, turning in a pass of 7.34 at 199 mph (320 km/h), quicker and faster than Steve Woods' hemi-engined BB/Gas Ford Anglia; the field also included twin-engine straight-six-cylinder-powered D/Ds, and AA/FAs.

The 1971 meet was marred by the death of "Sneaky Pete" Robinson, who wrecked his TF/D in qualifying, with a 6.77 pass.

Altereds were so popular in the 1960s and 1970s, at the 1977 Winternationals, more than 75 drivers contested for the Comp Eliminator title. Among them was Ed Prout, who brought his A/Altered from Connecticut.

NHRA introduced a significant change to the Christmas tree, LEDs instead of incandescent bulbs, at Pomona in 2003.

At Pomona in 2014, Alexis DeJoria became the first woman ever to make a sub-four second pass, with a 3.997-second e.t.

In 2018, in the professional categories, Top Fuel Dragster went to Doug Kalitta, Top fuel Funny Car to Matt Hagan, and Pro Stock to Bo Butner.

In 2021, the Winternationals was moved to summer because of the ongoing coronavirus pandemic and restrictions imposed by California. The NHRA decided to move the Gatornationals to the season opening slot. In an unusual fashion, the Top Fuel final was determined by default when one finalist was pulled out by NHRA officials over driver safety when he had heat exhaustion. In addition, because the Kent, WA event was cancelled by King County, Washington officials, the Winternationals became part of the NHRA's Western Swing, which necessitated the Pro Stock Motorcycle category to be run for one year only. From 2021-26, the move of the Super Bowl that was made in effect for 2021, the NHRA has since moved the Winternationals to the spring, and the Gatornationals in Florida now start the season going forward. In 2024, the Winternationals were abandoned after the semifinals because of weather, and a second final was added to Firebird Motorsports Park in Chandler, Arizona.

== Past Winners ==
Year (season)	Top Fuel Dragster (TF/D)	Top Fuel Funny Car (TF/FC)	Pro Stock	Pro Stock Motorcycle	Source
1961	Jack Chrisman (Top Eliminator)	Mickey Thompson (Middle Eliminator)			
1962	Jim Nelson (Top Eliminator)	Gary Cagle (Middle Eliminator)			
1963	Don "Big Daddy" Garlits				
1964	Jack Williams	Ronnie Sox (S/X)			
1965	Don "The Snake" Prudhomme				
1966	Mike Snively	Clare Sanders (FCE)			
1967	Connie Kalitta				
1968	Jim Warren		Gene "Snowman" Snow		
1969	John Mulligan	Clare Sanders			
1970	Larry Dixon (TFE)				
1971	Don "Big Daddy" Garlits	Butch Maas (FCE)	Ronnie Sox		
1972	Carl Olson	Ed "The Ace" McCulloch	Bill "Grumpy" Jenkins		
1973	Don "Big Daddy" Garlits	Don Schumacher	"Dyno Don" Nicholson		
1974	Gary Beck	Dale Emery	Bill "Grumpy" Jenkins		
1975	Don "Big Daddy" Garlits	Don "The Snake" Prudhomme	Bill "Grumpy" Jenkins		
1976	Frank Bradley	Don "The Snake" Prudhomme	Bill "Grumpy" Jenkins		
1977	Jerry Ruth	Don "The Snake" Prudhomme	Larry Lombardo		
1978	Kelly Brown	Don "The Snake" Prudhomme	Bob Glidden		
1979	Bob Noice	Tom Hoover	Bob Glidden		
1980	Shirley Muldowney	Dale Pulde	Lee Shepherd		
1981	Jeb Allen	Billy Meyer	Bob Glidden		
1982	Dick LaHaie	Al Segrini	Frank Iaconio		
1983	Shirley Muldowney	Frank Hawley	Frank Iaconio		
1984	Gary Ormsby	Al Segrini	Lee Shepherd		
1985	Joe Amato	Al Segrini	Bob Glidden		
1986	Darrell Gwynn	Tim Grose	Frank Iaconio		
1987	Don "Big Daddy" Garlits	Kenny Bernstein	Warren Johnson		
1988	Dick LaHaie	Dale Pulde	Butch Leal		
1989	Gary Ormsby	Bruce Larson	Bob Glidden		
1990	Lori Johns	K.C. Spurlock	Jerry Eckman		
1991	Frank Bradley	John Force	Darrell Alderman		
1992	Kenny Bernstein	Jim Epler	Jerry Eckman		
1993	Joe Amato	John Force	Warren Johnson		
1994	Shelly Anderson	K.C. Spurlock	Warren Johnson		
1995	Eddie Hill	Cruz Pedregon	Darrell Alderman		
1996	Blaine Johnson	Al Hofmann	Jim Yates		
1997	Gary Scelzi	John Force	Warren Johnson		
1998	Larry Dixon	Ron Capps	Jim Yates		
1999	Mike Dunn	Tony Pedregon	Jeg Coughlin Jr.		
2000	Gary Scelzi	Jerry Toliver	Jeg Coughlin Jr.		
2001	Darrell Russell	Bruce Sarver	Kurt Johnson		
2002	Larry Dixon	John Force	George Marnell		
2003	Larry Dixon	Tony Pedregon	Warren Johnson		
2004	Tony Schumacher	Jerry Toliver	Greg Anderson		
2005	Scott Kalitta	Tommy Johnson Jr.	Dave Connolly		
2006	Melanie Troxel	Robert Hight	Greg Anderson		
2007	J. R. Todd	Gary Scelzi	Greg Anderson		
2008	Tony Schumacher	Robert Hight	Greg Anderson		
2009	Doug Kalitta	Ron Capps	Jason Line		
2010	Larry Dixon	John Force	Mike Edwards		
2011	Morgan Lucas	Robert Hight	Jason Line		
2012	Spencer Massey	John Force	Greg Anderson		
2013	Shawn Langdon	Courtney Force	Vincent Nobile		
2014	Khalid al-Balooshi	John Force	Jason Line		
2015	Shawn Langdon	Matt Hagan	Jason Line		
2016	Steve Torrence	Ron Capps	Greg Anderson		
2017	Leah Pruett	Matt Hagan	Jason Line		
2018	Doug Kalitta	Matt Hagan	Bo Butner		
2019	Doug Kalitta	Robert Hight	Bo Butner		
2020	Doug Kalitta	Jack Beckman	Jeg Coughlin Jr.		
2021	Leah Pruett	Ron Capps	Aaron Stanfield	Matt Smith	
2022	Justin Ashley	Robert Hight	Erica Enders		
2023	Justin Ashley	Matt Hagan	Dallas Glenn		
2024 (Finished Up In Phoenix)	Justin Ashley	John Force	Dallas Glenn		
2025	Clay Millican	Jack Beckman	Greg Anderson		
2026	Tony Stewart	Matt Hagan	Greg Anderson		
