= 1971 NHRA Winternationals =

National Hot Rod Association
- Venue: Pomona Dragstrip
- Location: Pomona, California

The 1971 NHRA Winternationals were a National Hot Rod Association (NHRA) drag racing event, held at Pomona, California on 7 February.

== Background ==
The Funny Car Eliminator title at the 1971 Winternats would go to Roland Leong's Dodge Charger, Hawaiian, with Butch Maas at the wheel. Don Garlits' novel rear-engined dragster, Swamp Rat XIV, appeared at the Winternats, qualifying with 6.8; his best time of the meet was a 6.70, over Jim Dunn's 7.58, in the semi-final: Garlits would win, when Kenny Safford broke in the final. The last Top Gas Eliminator crown, before NHRA abolished the class, went to Walt Stevens, at the wheel of Ken Theiss' twin-engined Odd Couple TG/D. Canadian Barrie Poole repeated his 1970 Winternats win in Super Stock, in a Sandy Elliot Mustang. Don Enriquez (in Gene Adams' A/FD) won Competition Eliminator, turning in a pass of 7.34 at 199 mph (320 km/h), quicker and faster than Steve Woods' hemi-engined BB/Gas Ford Anglia; the field also included twin-engine straight-six-cylinder-powered D/Ds, and AA/FAs.

The year's award for Best Engineered Car went to Jim Busby, with a dragster powered by a pair of injected 427 "Cammer" (SOHC) engines. (Hank Westmoreland failed to qualify the car, and it never ran again.)

The meet was marred by the death of "Sneaky Pete" Robinson, who wrecked his TF/D in qualifying, with a 6.77 pass, which would have been #4 qualifier.

== Results ==
=== Top Fuel Dragster ===
The Top Fuel Dragster (TF/D) field was 32 cars. Ron Rivero, Larry Dixon Sr., Jim Paoli, Gary Cochran, and John Mitchell attended, but failed to qualify.

==== Round one ====
Top qualifier Norm Wilcox (driving for Ted Gotelli) went out to #17 qualifier Jimmy King. "TV Tommy" Ivo, qualified #13, lost to Glen Woosley, who qualified #29. Larry Hendrickson qualified #24, losing to #8 qualifier Gerry Glenn. Jerry "The King" Ruth qualified #14, and was eliminated by #30 qualifier Carl Olson. #6 qualifier Rick Ramsey eliminated #22 qualifier Don "The Snake" Prudhomme. Don Cook qualified #28 and fell to Tom "Mongoo$e" McEwen. #31 qualifier Bill Alexander lost to #15 qualifier Kenny Safford (driving for Larry Bowers). Mike Tarter qualified #27 and lost to Jim Davis (qualified #11). #26 qualifier Tom Allen was eliminated by Don "Big Daddy" Garlits, who qualified #10 (in Swamp Rat XIV). #25 qualifier Denver Schutz lost to #9 qualifier Herman Petersen. Chris "The Greek" Karamesines qualified #7 and eliminated Paul Schoenfeld, who qualified #23. #22 qualifier Don Prudhomme was eliminated by #6 qualifier Rick Ramsey (in the Keeling & Clayton car). Les Allen qualified #21 and was beaten by Don Moody, who qualified #5. #32 qualifier Bill Dunlap lost to #16 qualifier Dennis Baca. #19 qualifier Ronnie Martin (later partner with Ronnie Sox) was eliminated by #3 qualifier Henry Harrison in the Ewell & Bell dragster. Jim Warren qualified #18, losing to #2 qualifier John Nichols (driving for Jerry Dee Hagood). Low qualifier Jim Dunn defeated #20 qualifier Ed Renck.

==== Round two ====
Dunn beat McEwen. Woosley was defeated by Moody. Glenn eliminated Baca. Davis lost to Harrison. King defeated Petersen. Safford lost to Karamesines. Olson defeated Ramsey. Nichols fell to Garlits.

==== Round three ====
Garlits defeated Olson. Moody fell to King. Glenn lost to Dunn. Safford eliminated Harrison.

==== Semi-final ====
Dunn was eliminated by Garlits, King by Safford.

==== Final ====
Garlits defeated Safford, when Safford broke. The win earned Garlits US$8,625.

=== Top Fuel Funny Car ===
Top Fuel Funny Car was only a 16-car field.

==== Round one ====
Jake Johnsto] qualified #1 in the 1971 Dodge Charger owned by Gene Snow, and eliminated #9 qualifier Tom Prock. Snow qualified #2 in a 1971 Charger, beating Jim Dunn. Tom Hoover, qualifying #7, was eliminated by #15 qualifier Mike Snively. Qualifying #12, Kenny Goodell lost to Roland Leong's Hawaiian, driven by Butch Maas. Dave Condit qualified #13 and lost to #5 qualifier Larry Reyes (driving a 1971 Plymouth Barracuda owned by "Big John" Mamazian). Don "The Snake" Prudhomme qualified #14, and was eliminated by #6 qualifier Stan Shiroma. #3 qualifier Dick Tharp's 1971 Ford Mustang (owned by Harry Schmidt) lost to the Ramchargers 1971 Dodge Challenger of Leroy Goldstein. Low qualifier Don Schumacher went out to Rich Siroonian's Mamazian-owned 1971 Barracuda.

==== Round two ====
Snively lost to Goldstein. Maas defeated Siroonian. Reyes was defeated by Johnston. Snow eliminated Shiroma.

==== Semi-final ====
Snow was eliminated by Maas. Johnston fell to Goldstein.

==== Final ====
Maas took the win over Goldstein, for a prize of US$8625.

=== Top Gas ===
The field included 16 qualifiers.

==== Round one ====
Top qualifier Larry Van Unen lost to #9 qualifier Walt Stevens (driving Ken Theiss' twin-engined Odd Couple TG/D). Low qualifier Chuck Beal lost to #5 qualifier Bill Mullins.

==== Round two ====
Mullins beat #10 qualifier Gene Brasel, and Stevens eliminated #6 qualifier Ray Hadford.

==== Semi-final ====
Jerry Goddard, #8 qualifier, lost to Mullins. Don Hampton, qualified #7, was eliminated by Mullins.

==== Final ====
Mullins lost to Stevens in the final, earning Stevens US$7125.

=== Pro Stock ===
The Pro Stock field was 16 cars. Attendees included Herb McCandless (qualified #2 in a 1970 Plymouth Barracuda), Dave Strickler (qualified #20), Jim Pettit (qualified #30), and Cecil Yother (qualified #31); none actually raced.

==== Round one ====
Top qualifier Ronnie Sox's Barracuda defeated #17 qualifier Dick Brannan. Rich Miracki, qualified # 27, lost to #11 qualifier "Dyno Don" Nicholson. #29 qualifier Ed Schartman lost to #13 qualifier Bill Jenkins' 1971 Chevrolet Camaro. #12 qualifier "Dandy Dick" Landy defeated #28 qualifier Hubert Platt. Bob Lambeck qualified #9 and eliminated #25 qualifier John Livingston. #22 qualifier Ed Miller lost to #6 qualifier Arlen Vanke. John Petrie qualified #3, and defeated #19 qualifier Ken Van Cleve. Bobby Yowell, #8 qualifier, lost to #24 qualifier Bill Tanner. Low qualifier Ed Terry was eliminated by #16 qualifier Wally Booth (driving a 1970 Camaro).

==== Round two ====
Tanner lost to Booth. Nicholson was eliminated by Petrie. Sox overcame Lambeck.

==== Semi-final ====
Jenkins was eliminated by Sox. Booth defeated Landy. Vanke was defeated by Booth. Petrie lost to Sox.

==== Final ====
Booth lost to Sox, who earned US$11,625 in prize money.
