= 1969 NHRA Winternationals =

National Hot Rod Association
- Location: Pomona, California

The 1969 NHRA Winternationals (commonly called the Winternats) were a National Hot Rod Association (NHRA) drag racing event, held at Pomona, California on 2 February.

== Top Fuel Dragster ==
The Top Fuel Dragster field was eight drivers: Larry Dixon (#1 qualifier), Don Prudhomme (#2 qualifier), John Mulligan, Jim Dunn, Bennie Osborn, Connie Kalitta, Jim Warren, Leroy Goldstein, and Tom Larkin. A number of top names attended, but failed to qualify, including Tom McEwen, "TV Tommy" Ivo, and Don Garlits.

Larkin lost in round one to Mulligan, Warren in round two, Osborn in round three. Dunn was defeated in the semi-final by Prudhomme, while Mulligan beat Goldstein. In the final, Mulligan took the win, and a US$6,900 purse.

== Top Fuel Funny Car ==
Top Fuel Funny Car saw a sixteen-car field, but stars including Danny Ongais, "Dyno Don" Nicholson, Roger Lindamood, "Jungle Jim" Liberman, and Jack Chrisman, along with Della Woods and Charlie Allen, failed to qualify.

=== Round one ===
The Barracuda of #1 qualifier Tom "Moogoo$e McEwen lost to Marv Eldridge, in the #9-qualifying odd man out AMC AMX. #14 qualifier Ed Schartman (Mercury Cougar) lost two Rich Siroonian's Mazmanian-owned #6-qualifying Barracuda. #12 qualifier Art Ward (in the Roger Guzman-owned Corvair) lost to #4 qualifieer Ray Alley's Barracuda. Kelly Chadwick, who qualified #11, fell to Clare Sanders, #3 qualifier in the Liberman Chevrolet. #5 qualifier Randy Walls faced #13 qualifier Leonard Hughes' Barracuda, and lost. Pat Foster, qualified #7 in the Mickey Thompson Mustang, was defeated by #15 qualifier Ron Leslie's Mercury Cougar. Dave Beebe, tenth-quickest in qualifying in the Nelson Carter Dodge Charger, was defeated by #2-quickest Don Schumacher's Barracuda. #8 qualifier Mike Hamby lost to highest-e.t. qualifier Larry Reyes, in Roland Leong's Dodge Charger.

=== Round two ===
Reyes lost to Alley, Leslie to Sanders, Eldridge to Hughes, Schumacher to Siroonian.

=== Round three ===
Sanders defeated Hughes and Alley beat Siroonian to go on to the final.

=== Final round ===
Sanders took the win, and a US$5000 purse.

== Top Gas ==
Top Gas was attended by three-time Winternats champion Gordon Collett (who did not qualify) and Mark Pieri; the title went to Dave Grassi.

== Super Stock ==
Don Grotheer defeated Jerry Harvey in the final round.

Super Stock Elim.

Don Grotheer def Jerry Harvey (Ford Mustang) Plymouth BO29 Barracuda - 426 Race Hemi - 10.73 ET
