= Jim Warren (drag racer) =

Jim Warren is an American Top Fuel Dragster driver. He won two National Hot Rod Association (NHRA) and two American Hot Rod Association (AHRA) national events.

== Top Fuel career ==
=== 1960s ===
Warren's first Top Fuel event was at Auto Club Raceway in Pomona, California, at the NHRA Winternats in February 1964. In a field including "Big Daddy") Don Garlits and Chris "The Greek" Karamesines, Warren was eliminated in round one by "TV Tommy" Ivo. At Beeline Dragway for the 1965 AHRA Winter Nationals in Scottsdale, Arizona in January 1965, Warren faced a field including Karamesines, Conrad "Connie" Kalitta, Tom Hoover, and Danny Ongais; Warren was eliminated by Hoover in Round Two.

Warren went to the 1965 NHRA Winternationals, along with Garlits, Tom "Mongoo$e" Mcewen, Ongais, Kalitta, and Art Malone; Warren again fell out in Round Two, losing to eventual event winner Don "The Snake" Prudhomme. Later that year, he faced Prudhomme and McEwen (the Hot Wheels-sponsored team) at the Hot Rod Magazine Championship Drag Races, held at Riverside Raceway, "one of the most significant drag racing events" of that era; the Top Fuel Eliminator (TFE) trophy that year went to Warren. (He would also appear in a film centering on the year's racing, produced by Hot Rod, "The Hot Rod Story—Drag Racing", narrated by Dick Enberg. In September, at the AHRA World Championship, held at Lions Drag Strip in Wilmington, California, Warren lost a Round One matchup to Harry Payne.

The 1966 Winternationals were better for Warren: he defeated Nando Haase in Round One, Mike Sorokin in Round Two, and Funny Car pioneer Jimmy Nix in Round Three, to reach the semi-final, before losing to eventual winner Mike Snively. At an AHRA match race in August, with no less than 58 entrants (including Garlits, McEwen, Karamesines, and Frank Pedregon), Warren made the field and survived to reach the semi-final, before being eliminated by eventual winner John Edmunds.

At the 1967 NHRA U.S. Nationals, held at Indianapolis Raceway Park, Warren turned in another fine performance. In a field including Snively and McEwen, he reached the final against Garlits, but lost there.

The 1968 Winternationals was Warren's best event yet. He took home a US$12,500 prize after defeating Dwight Salisbury in the final. In March at a PDA invitational at OCIR in Irvine, California, also attended by Garlits, "Sneaky Pete" Robinson, Snively, Prudhomme, McEwen, Kalitta, and Larry Dixon Sr., Warren went out in Round One. In November, the Race of Champions Invitational (also organized by PDA, held at Lions) saw appearances by NHRA's top drivers: Garlits, Prudhommme, John Mulligan, McEwen, Steve Carbone, Ruth, and Karamesines; after three rounds of eliminations, Warren was ranked third, behind Garlits and "King" Ruth. The next day, at a second Race of Champions Invitational (again organized by PDA, this time held at Carlsbad Raceway in Carlsbad, California), the same slate of drivers put Warren sixth after three rounds. One week after that, at a third PDA Race of Champions Invitational, held at Sacramento, California's Sacramento Raceway, Warren came out on top, ahead of Garlits.

Warren started the 1969 season at the AHRA Winter Nationals at Beeline by qualifying #15 in a 32-car field, which included Leroy "The Israeli Rocket" Goldstein, Karamesines, Robinson, Carbone, Cliff Zink, "King" Ruth, Hoover, and Prudhomme, among others. He followed in February with the Winter Nationals, qualifying #21 in a field for which Garlits, McEwen, Snively, and Ivo, among others, failed to make. Warren would be eliminated in Round Two by eventual winner John Mulligan.

=== 1970s ===
The next year at Pomona, Warren made a 32-car field, which included Kelly Brown, Jim Dunn, and Tony Nancy, qualifying #11; he was eliminated in Round Two by Larry Dixon, who went on to take the event win. In November, at the NHRA Supernationals at Ontario Motor Speedway in Ontario, California, Warren again qualified for a 32-car field, which included Snively, Salisbury, Carbone, an up-and-coming Dick LaHaie, Garlits, Ruth, and others. Warren's #18 slot put him up against #2 qualifier Ongais in Round One, and Warren lost.

At an NHRA Division 7 Top Fuel event at OCIR in January 1971, with a field of just eight, Warren fell to event winner Gary Cochran (in a Carl Casper owned digger); Warren took home US$150 for his effort. The 32-car field for NHRA Winternationals included many stars, including Dunn, Carl Olson, McEwen, Prudhomme, Karamesines, and Ruth (and for which Dixon failed to qualify). It proved a tragic event, when "Sneaky Pete" Robinson was killed in qualifying. Warren qualified #18, and, once again, lost in Round One, to #2 qualifier John Nichols (in the Jerry Dee Hagood slingshot). At the Supernationals at Ontario in November, the 32-car field included Prudhomme, Dixon, Nancy, and Olson, among others; Warren qualified #20, and was eliminated by #4 qualifier Larry Dixon in Round One.

At the first Grand Premiere, an NHRA Division 7 Top Fuel event at Lions in January 1972, the 8-car field included Prudhomme, Olson, Nancy. and Jim Paoli; Warren's #16 qualifying e.t. was insufficient to make it. Warren went to the Winternationals, along with Olson, Cochran, Prudhomme, Garlits, Nancy, Dixon, and Ongais, among others; he qualified #17, eliminating low e.t. qualifier Garlits in Round One before losing to #25 qualifier Dwight Salisbury in Round Two. At Tulsa Raceway Park in Tulsa, Oklahoma in September, Warren entered the AHRA National Challenge, along with Dixon, LaHaie, Ronnie Martin, and others; Warren qualified #17, and lost in Round One to low e.t. qualifier Garlits, taking a prize of US$500.

The 1973 Winternationals saw Warren qualify #27. In March, he attended AHRA's Northern Nationals, at Fremont Drag Strip in Fremont, California; he reached the final round before being eliminated by #10 qualifier Garlits (in Swamp Rat XIX). In October, he returned to Fremont for AHRA's World Finals, in a John Wiebe-owned car. Qualifying #2, Warren eliminated Jack Martin and Chris Karamesines on his way to a final round showdown with Garlits; Swamp Rat XIX won again. Warren attended the Supernationals at Ontario in November, but failed to qualify.

Among the 71 entries, Warren turned in low e.t. to qualify for the 1974 Winternationals field, which included Garlits, Ivo, Ruth, and Gary Beck. It enabled Warren to eliminate #9 qualifier Jim Murphy in Round One, but was not enough to get by #13 qualifier Ruth in Round Two. In March, Warren qualified #3 for the Northern Nationals; he fell out in Round One to Dennis Baca. At an AHRA event at OCIR in April, also attended by Salisbury and Dixon, Warren went to a final round with Garlits, but lost (again to Swamp Rat XIX). In October, Warren was top qualifier for the Supernationals at Ontario, also attended by Olson, Garlits, Dixon, Gaines Markley]], Ruth, and Beck, among others; Warren lost to #9 qualifier Jake Johnston in Round One.

The AHRA Winter Nationals at Beeline in January 1975 was attended by (among others) Garlits, Beck, and Top Fuel newcomer Shirley Muldowney (who qualified #3); Muldowney lost to Warren in Round Two, while Warren was eliminated in the final by #4 qualifier Marvin Graham. At OCIR in March, Warren recorded an AHRA event win, defeating Bob Noice in the final. For the U.S. Nationals in September, Warren qualified #6, but was eliminated in Round One by #22 qualifier Graham. Later that month, at the NHRA Fallnationals, held at Pacific Raceways in Kent, Washington, Warren qualified #3, but proved unable to capitalize on it. At Ontario in October, the NHRA World Finals were attended also by Beck, Ivo, Richard Tharp, and Garlits, among others. Warren qualified #6, and eliminated Garth Widdison (qualified #14) in Round One, but was defeated by #2-qualified Beck in Round Two.

Warren racked up a win at NHRA's Winter Classic, held at Beeline Dragway in January 1976. He was low e.t. qualifier, eliminating #9 qualifier Jim Plummer in Round One, Markley in Round Two, #3 qualifier Herman Petersen in the semi-final, and #6 qualifier Beck in the final. It earned Warren a US$3000 purse. At Pomona in February, in a field of 16 cars (for which neither Muldowney nor Dixon qualified), Warren qualified #6, defeating #14 qualifier Salisbury in Round One, Beck (qualified #2) in Round Two, and Tom Kaiser (#8 qualifier) in the semi-final; he lost to #3 qualifier Frank Bradley in the final. At the Gatornationals, Warren qualified #5 and eliminated #13 qualifier Larry Petit, #1 qualifier Beck, Bradley, and #10 qualifier Jim Bucher, on his way to a win, taking home US$12,250. In June, Warren was at National Trail Raceway in Hebron, Ohio, for the Springnationals; he qualified #3, but was defeated in Round One by #11 qualifier Ted Wolf. Englishtown hosted the Summernationals in July, attended by, among others, Beck and Tharp; Warren qualified #10, and went out in Round One, to #2 qualifier Bob Struksnes. That September, Warren, along with the likes of Beck, Muldowney, and Ruth, went to the U.S. Nationals; Warren failed to make the field. The next weekend, he was at Spokane County Raceway in Airway Heights, Washington for the AHRA World Finals; qualifying #5, he defeated #2 qualifier Jim Barnard, #4 qualifier Gary Beck (who had already defeated low e.t. qualifier "King" Ruth), and #7 qualifier Frank Bradley to take the win. The weekend after that, Warren qualified #1 for the Fallnationals; the event win went to Jeb Allen. In October, Warren joined Muldowney, Tharp, Ruth, Bradley, and others at the NHRA World Finals, where he qualified #4. He defeated Tharp (qualified #12) in Round One) and #8 qualifier Hank Johnson in Round Two before being eliminated in the semi-final by #6-qualified Ruth.

January 1977's PRO Top Fuel Winter Nationals, at Beeline, was especially successful, featuring appearances by Ruth, Muldowney, and LaHaie, among others. Qualifying #6, Warren defeated #14 qualifier Beck in Round One, #2 qualifier Garlits in Round Two, and #4 qualifier Jeb Allen in the semi-final, before eliminating Bill Pryor (qualified #7) in the final. Later that month at Pomona, Warren qualified #7, defeating Rick Ramsey in Round One before losing to Ruth in Round Two. At the Gatornationals, Warren qualified #4, and was beaten in Round One by #12 qualifier Grant Stoms. The next weekend, at the International Hot Rod Association (IHRA) Winter Nationals, held at Darlington Dragway in Hartsville, South Carolina, Warren qualified #9; Paul Longenecker (qualified #5) would win the event. At State Capitol Raceway (Port Allen, Louisiana) in June, Warren joined a Cajun Nationals field including Muldowney and Beck, qualifying #4; the event was won by Richard Tharp. The next week, at National Trail Raceway, Warren failed to qualify for the Springnationals. At Indianapolis in September, Warren eliminated Beck in Round One, only to be defeated in turn by Rance McDaniel in Round Three. In his final NHRA event, the Fallnationals, Warren defeated "King" Ruth in Round One, only to lose to #10 qualifier (and eventual meet winner) Stan Shiroma in Round Two.

Despite his paucity of event wins, Warren was NHRA's Division Seven points leader every year from 1975 to 1978.
