= Pete Robinson (drag racer) =

American drag racer

- Born: Lew Russell Robinson; June 2, 1933 Atlanta, Georgia, U.S.
- Died: February 6, 1971 (aged 37) Pomona, California, U.S.

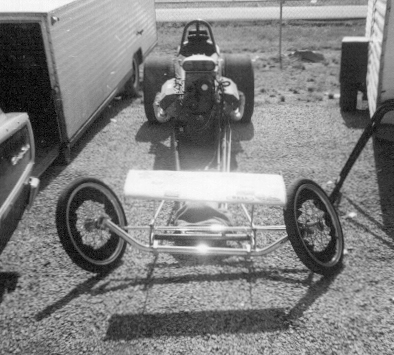
Robinson's 1966 dragster

Lew Russell Robinson (June 2, 1933 – February 6, 1971), nicknamed "Sneaky Pete", was an American drag racer.

== Biography ==
Robinson was born in Atlanta, Georgia. Robinson was born Lew Russell Robinson but is best known as Pete or "Sneaky Pete". Pete is the son of Olaf Robinson brother to Lowell Galen Robinson or "LG". Olaf had two sons Torch and Pete Robinson. Pete married wife Sandra Robinson on October, 27 1962, at the family home in Fitzgerald. They lived in Atlanta where Pete owned Pete's Engineering Company and raced NHRA top fuel dragsters. Pete's wife traveled with him to the races, and helped her husband run his business until his death.

== Career ==
=== Gassers ===
Robinson started drag racing in 1950, at the wheel of a Buick-engined B/Gas 1940 Ford, which he continued to campaign until 1961.

=== Dragsters ===
Robinson purchased his first slingshot rail from a wealthy friend, who was unable to persuade his father it was merely a go kart. Robinson, obsessive about lightening his cars (once quipping, "Anything that falls to the ground when you let it go from your hand is way too heavy to be on my race car.") immediately began trimming weight off the car, reducing it from 1,256 to 1,120 lb (570 to 508 kg) over the course of three months. He improved its performance from a previous quickest pass of 9.50 seconds to a 9.13.

A focus on weight reduction prompted Robinson switch to a 289 cu in (4,740 cc) Cobra engine, which was 50 lb (23 kg) lighter than the Chevrolet.

He gained national attention at NHRA's 1961 Nationals at Indianapolis Raceway Park in his small-block Dragmaster-chassied gas dragster, eliminating Tom McEwen (not yet known as "Mongoo$e") to win AA/GD before beating Dode Martin to take the Top Eliminator title. Along the way, he set low e.t. of the meet with an 8.68 second pass, which contributed to his "Sneaky Pete" appellation.

At the 1962 NHRA Winternationals, Robinson reached the semi-final in Top Eliminator before being defeated by eventual event winner Nelson.

Robinson also attended the 1963 NHRA U.S. Nationals at IRP.

=== Top Fuel ===
==== 1964 ====
Robinson moved up to Top Fuel in 1964. He did compete in Top Gas at the U.S. Nationals, losing in the final to Gordon Collett.

==== 1965 ====
Relying on a new 427 cu in (7,000 cc) Ford "Cammer", he reached TF/D final the 1965 Springnationals at Bristol Motor Speedway, being eliminated by Maynard Rupp. In Top Gas at that event, he lost to Collett again.

==== 1966 ====
Robinson started his 1966 Top Fuel season at the AHRA Winter Nationals at Irwindale Dragway in Irwindale, California. At Pomona, he was eliminated in the second round by Mike Snively (driving for Roland Leong). Robinson was eliminated in round one at Bristol. At the NASCAR Summer Nationals, held at Dragway 42 in West Salem, Ohio, he qualified #2, and defeated #10 qualifier Joe Jacono in round 1, Chris "The Greek" Karamesines (#14 qualifier) in round two, and #16 qualifier Connie Kalitta in the semi-final, before losing in the final to #1 qualifier Nick Marshall. At the Nationals, he lost in round one to Nick Marshall.

Robinson took his first Top Fuel win just over a month later, the World Finals, at Tulsa Raceway Park in Tulsa, Oklahoma. He eliminated Kalitta in round one and Wayne Burt in the semi-final, before defeating Dave Beebe in the final with a 7.17 second pass.

==== 1967 ====
Robinson started the 1967 season with a victory over Jerry "King" Ruth, but a loss in the semi-final to Kalitta, at Pomona.

He suffered a broken arm in tire testing early in the year, but still made it to the TF/D final of the 1967 Springnationals at Bristol, eliminating Tom Hoover in round one and Leroy Goldstein ("the Israeli Rocket") in the semi-final, before being beaten in the final by Don "The Snake" Prudhomme. During the 1967 season, he also tied McEwen's record 6.92 second pass.

==== 1968 ====
Beeline Dragway in Scottsdale, Arizona hosted the AHRA Winter Nationals to start the 1968 season. With the field including Tom Hoover, Frank Pedgregon, Leroy Goldstein, Danny Ongais, Tom "Mongoo$e" McEwen, and Chris "The Greek" Karamesines, Robinson again lost to Prudhomme in the final. At a match race at OCIR in March, Robinson joined Larry Dixon, Prudhomme, Kalitta, McEwen, and Don "Big Daddy" Garlits; Garlits would ultimately be beaten in the final by Vic Brown. At the Springnats at Englishtown, again facing the likes of Karamesines, Prudhomme, Kalitta, and Garlits, Robinson failed to qualify.

==== 1969 ====
Opening the 1969 season, Robinson returned to Beeline, qualifying #30 for the AHRA Winter Nationals, in a field that included Goldstein (the eventual winner), Hoover, Karamesines, Prudhomme, Kalitta, and Dixon. The AHRA Spring Nationals featured a field of sixteen, again hosting Goldstein (once more the eventual winner), Karamesines, and Prudhomme; Robinson qualified #15. At the NHRA Nationals, he was eliminated in round one by eventual winner Prudhomme. The event was marred by John "The Zookeeper" Mulligan's wreck; Mulligan died of his burns sixteen days later.

==== 1970 ====
The 1970 AHRA Winter Nationals saw Robinson qualify #14 in a field of 16, only to lose in round one to #3 qualifier John Wiebe; the early loss earned Robinson just US$200. Robinson won TF/D at the Summernationals, at York U.S. 30 Dragway in Thomasville, Pennsylvania, by beating Jim Nicoll in the final It earned him US$7250. Later that year, he won the 1970 AHRA World Championship at Bristol, beating Jimmy King in the final. Before the year ended, he went back to IRP for the NHRA U.S. Nationals, eliminating Chip Woodall in round 1 and Bob Murray in round two before losing in round three to Prudhomme. Robinson attended the 1970 NHRA World Finals at DIMS, in Lewisville, Texas; it was won by Ronnie Martin. Robinson went back to Beeline for the 1970 AHRA Winter Nationals, but failed to make the field.

Following his successful 1970 season, now being the only driver left running a 427 Cammer, and having lost factory support, Robinson decided to retire and concentrate on building lightweight casings for superchargers, differentials, and similar components. He hired Bud Dabler to drive his new ground effect-equipped dragster, instead. Dabler disliked the car.

==== 1971 ====
Entering at Lions for a 1971 AHRA TF/D event, Robinson was eliminated in round one by Rick Ramsey, which paid just US$200. At the first ANRA Grand American Series event of the season, Robinson clocked the quickest pass of his career, a 6.50, in the new car, and decided to enter at the 1971 Winternats, only three weeks away. At Pomona on 6 February, he qualified with a 6.77, low e.t. of the day. On a subsequent pass, the chassis twisted, causing the front tires to separate from the rims; Robinson, in the right lane, hit the guardrail, and the car broke in pieces.

== Death and legacy ==
Robinson was taken to hospital in Pomona and died later that day. He was 37.

At his death, Robinson was "one of the sport's best-liked gentlemen". Don Garlits, himself an innovator, respected Robinson's engineering: "Pete was always on the edge of the envelope..."

He would be listed #22 on NHRA.'s list of its Top 50 Greatest Drivers.

Robinson was survived by his daughter, Kelly Robinson Vann (Glen).

== Sources ==
- Brown, Allan E. The History of America's Speedways - Past & Present, 2nd edition. Comstock Park, MI, United States, 1994. ISBN 0-931105-42-0.
- Steve Klemetti's Drag Racing Statistics Page
