= 1980 NHRA Winternationals =

Drag racing event

The 1980 NHRA Winternationals (commonly known as the Winternats) were a National Hot Rod Association (NHRA) drag racing event, held at Auto Club Raceway in Pomona, California, on February 3.

== Top Fuel Dragster ==
Shirley Muldowney qualified her all-new (and later signature) pink digger $6, at 5.90 seconds and 245 mph (394 km/h), and Connie Kalitta, who turned in a #1-qualifying 5.85 second pass. The field also included Rance McDaniel (with a 5.85 second/249.30 mph (401.21 km/h) pass), John Kimble, Frank Bradley, Chris "The Greek" Karamesines, and Gary Beck; Don Garlits' 6.05/243.24 mph (391.46 km/h) pass was not good enough to qualify.

Kalitta defeated former world champions in all three early rounds: Rob Bruins, who redlighted; Beck; and Richard Tharp. Muldowney faced #14 qualifier Mark Oswald in round one, Dave Uyehara (qualified #10) in round two, and #4-qualifier Kimble in round three.

The event win went to Muldowney, who defeated Kalitta in the final, their fourth final round meeting in a row, and Muldowney's fourth win. Muldowney's winning pass was 5.94 seconds at 247.25 mph (397.91 km/h), to Kalitta's 6.03/233.76 mph (376.20 km/h).

Muldowney also claimed Low E.T.(5.83) and Top Speed (249.30 mph (401.21 km/h), tying McDaniel) of the meet for the class Low qualifying e.t. paid Kalitta $1000 from 7-Up.

== Top Fuel Funny Car ==
Dale Pulde's War Eagle Dodge Challenger qualified #8, at 6.12/238 mph (383 km/h). In round one, he defeated the Pontiac Firebird of Jim Dunn (qualified #10) in round one, Hank Johnson in round two, and Kenny Bernstein, whose fueller got badly out of shape, in the semi-final. (qualified

War Eagle suffered chassis cracking, which was repaired with the assistance of every other team in the class, just before the final round.

In the final, Pulde faced off against Ron Colson, in Roland Leong's Hawaiian Dodge Omni, who qualified #11; Colson was disqualified after crossing the centerline. Pulde recorded a pass of 6.25 seconds at 238.72 mph (384.18 km/h). War Eagle's chassis broke at the end of the winning pass.

"240 Gordie" Bonin's #13-qualified Firebird took top speed of the meet in class, with a pass of 245.23 mph (394.66 km/h), before hitting a safety net. Low E.T. in class went to Kosty Ivanof's Chevrolet Corvette, at 6.05. Low qualifying e.t. also paid Ivanof $1000 from 7-Up.

== Pro Stock ==
The event win went to Lee Shepherd, after Jim Meyer was eliminated in round one and gearbox trouble took out Bob Glidden in the second round and a broken chassis claimed Kevin Rotty in the semi-final.

Rotty, in a 1980 Camaro owned by Jack Manchester, recorded Low E.T. and Top Speed in class, at 8.49 seconds and 161.57 mph (260.02 km/h). Low e.t. earned Rotty $500 from 7-Up.

== Top Gas Eliminator ==
The newly-introduced class was won by Bob Tietz, topping a thirty-two car field; at the wheel of a Chevrolet-powered '23 Model T, he defeated Bruce Williams in the final round, with a pass of 9.88 seconds at 117 mph (188 km/h).

== Pro Comp ==
Pro Comp Eliminator was won by Brian Raymer's alcohol dragster, with a 6.67/207 mph (333 km/h) pass, defeating an unexpected finalist, Fred Hagen, in the BB/FC Darkhorse.

== Sources ==
- Wallace, Dave. "Shirley Wins the West!", in Hot Rod, April 1980, p. 52-6.
