= NHRA U.S. Nationals =

Annual drag racing event in Brownsburg, Indiana, U.S.

Cornwell Quality Tools NHRA U.S. Nationals

National Hot Rod Association
- Venue: Great Bend Municipal Airport (1955); Kansas City Missouri (1956); Oklahoma State Fairgrounds (1957–1958); Detroit Dragway (1959–1960); Lucas Oil Indianapolis Raceway Park (1961–present)
- Location: Brownsburg, Indiana, U.S. 39°48′46″N 86°20′27″W
- Corporate sponsor: Cornwell Tools
- First race: 1955
- Previous names: U.S. Nationals

The Cornwell Quality Tools NHRA U.S. Nationals (also known as The Big Go) is an NHRA-sanctioned drag racing event, generally considered to be the most prestigious drag racing event in the world due to its history, size, and purse, held annually at Lucas Oil Indianapolis Raceway Park in Brownsburg, Indiana.

Traditionally a Labor Day weekend event, the eliminations are usually held on Monday, but moved to Sunday in 2020 and 2021 because of logistics as a result of the coronavirus pandemic compacted the NHRA schedule and for live television purposes (the final round airs live on Fox), and is the longest-running Labor Day motorsports event in the United States, a distinction it earned in 2004. The U.S. Nationals air on the Fox broadcast network under the current broadcast contract.

The first edition of the NHRA Nationals was held at the Great Bend Municipal Airport in Great Bend, Kansas in 1955. The event moved first to Oklahoma City's Oklahoma State Fairgrounds for the "4th annual National Championship Drag Races Sponsored by the National Hot Rod Association" in 1958, then moved to Detroit Dragway in Detroit, Michigan for 1959–1960 before moving to Indianapolis Raceway Park in 1961, and has remained there ever since, after a verbal deal was made between NHRA founder and Board Chairman Wally Parks and the then-owners of the track. In 1979, the NHRA bought the entire complex. In 2006, it was renamed O'Reilly Raceway Park at Indianapolis, after auto parts supplier O'Reilly Auto Parts purchased naming rights. In 2011, Lucas Oil purchased the rights, renaming the venue Lucas Oil Raceway at Indianapolis but then in 2022 it was renamed Lucas Oil Indianapolis Raceway Park.

== Past winners ==
=== Professional Classes ===
Year	Top Fuel (TF)	Funny Car (FC)	Pro Stock (PS)	Pro Stock Motorcycle (PSM)
1961	Pete Robinson (Top Eliminator)			
1962	Jack Chrisman (Top Eliminator)			
1963	Robert Vodnik			
1964	Don "Big Daddy" Garlits			
1965	Don "The Snake" Prudhomme			
1966	Mike Snively			
1967	Don Garlits	Doug Thorley	Bill "Grumpy" Jenkins	
1968	Don Garlits			
1969	Don Prudhomme	Danny Ongais		
1970	Don Prudhomme	Don Schumacher	Herb McCandless	
1971	Steve Carbone	Ed "The Ace" McCulloch	Ronnie Sox	
1972	Gary Beck	Ed McCulloch	Ray Allen	
1973	Gary Beck	Don Prudhomme	Bob Glidden	
1974	Marvin Graham	Don Prudhomme	Bob Glidden	
1975	Don Garlits	Raymond Beadle	Wayne Gapp	
1976	Richard Tharp	Gary Burgin	Wally Booth	
1977	Dennis Baca	Don Prudhomme	"Dyno Don" Nicholson	
1978	Don Garlits	Tom "Mongoo$e" McEwen	Bob Glidden	
1979	Kelly Brown	Gordie Bonin	Bob Glidden	Terry Vance
1980	Terry Capp	Ed McCulloch	Lee Shepherd	
1981	Johnny Abbot	Raymond Beadle	Lee Shepherd	
1982	Shirley Muldowney	Billy Meyer	Frank Iaconio	
1983	Gary Beck	Kenny Bernstein	Bob Glidden	
1984	Don Garlits	Jim Head	Warren Johnson	
1985	Don Garlits	John Lombardo	Bob Glidden	Terry Vance
1986	Don Garlits	Mike Dunn	Bob Glidden	Terry Vance
1987	Joe Amato	Kenny Bernstein	Bob Glidden	Dave Schultz
1988	Joe Amato	Ed McCulloch	Bob Glidden	Dave Schultz
1989	Darrell Gwynn	Don Prudhomme	Larry Morgan	John Myers
1990	Joe Amato	Ed McCulloch	Jerry Eckman	Dave Schultz
1991	Kenny Bernstein	Jim White	Darrell Alderman	Jim Bernard
1992	Ed McCulloch	Cruz Pedregon	Warren Johnson	Dave Schultz
1993	Pat Austin	John Force	Warren Johnson	Dave Schultz
1994	Connie Kalitta	Cruz Pedregon	Warren Johnson	Dave Schultz
1995	Larry Dixon	Cruz Pedregon	Warren Johnson	Rick Ward
1996	Cory McClenathan	John Force	Kurt Johnson	John Myers
1997	Jim Head	Whit Bazemore	Kurt Johnson	John Myers
1998	Gary Scelzi	John Force	Mike Edwards	Matt Hines
1999	Cory McClenathan	Frank Pedregon	Warren Johnson	Matt Hines
2000	Tony Schumacher	Jim Epler	Jeg Coughlin Jr.	Antron Brown
2001	Larry Dixon	Whit Bazemore	Greg Anderson	Angelle Seeling
2002	Tony Schumacher	John Force	Jeg Coughlin Jr.	Angelle Savoie
2003	Tony Schumacher	Tim Wilkerson	Greg Anderson	Reggie Showers
2004	Tony Schumacher	Gary Densham	Greg Anderson	Antron Brown
2005	Larry Dixon	Del Worsham	Greg Anderson	Steve Johnson
2006	Tony Schumacher	Robert Hight	Greg Anderson	Matt Smith
2007	Tony Schumacher	Mike Ashley	Dave Connolly	Craig Treble
2008	Tony Schumacher	Robert Hight	Dave Connolly	Steve Johnson
2009	Tony Schumacher	Ashley Force Hood	Jeg Coughlin Jr.	Hector Arana
2010	Larry Dixon	Ashley Force Hood	Greg Stanfield	L.E. Tonglet
2011	Antron Brown	Mike Neff	Greg Anderson	L.E. Tonglet
2012	Tony Schumacher	Mike Neff	Dave Connolly	Andrew Hines
2013	Shawn Langdon	Robert Hight	Mike Edwards	John Hall
2014	Richie Crampton	Alexis DeJoria	Shane Gray	Eddie Krawiec
2015	Morgan Lucas	Jack Beckman	Erica Enders-Stevens	Jerry Savoie
2016	Tony Schumacher	Matt Hagan	Chris McGaha	Andrew Hines
2017	Steve Torrence	J.R. Todd	Drew Skillman	Eddie Krawiec
2018	Terry McMillen	J.R. Todd	Tanner Gray	LE Tonglet
2019	Doug Kalitta	John Force	Alex Laughlin	Jerry Savoie
2020	Shawn Langdon	Jack Beckman	Erica Enders	Scotty Pollacheck
2021	Steve Torrence	Tim Wilkerson	Erica Enders	Eddie Krawiec
2022	Antron Brown	Ron Capps	Greg Anderson	Matt Smith
2023	Antron Brown	Ron Capps	Matt Hartford	Matt Smith
2024	Clay Millican	Austin Prock	Aaron Stanfield	Gaige Herrera
2025	Justin Ashley	Austin Prock	Erica Enders	Gaige Herrera
2026	Shawn Langdon	Jack Beckman	Dallas Glenn	Matt Smith

=== Sportsman Classes ===
Year	Top Gas (Dragster {TG/D}, Funny Car {TG/FC}, Eliminator {TGE})
1959	"Ohio George" Montgomery
1960	George Montgomery
1961	George Montgomery
1962	
1963	"Ohio George" Montgomery
1964	
1965	
1966	
1967	
1968	George Montgomery
1969	George Montgomery
1970	
1971	George Montgomery
