= Super Mustang =

Overview
- Manufacturer: Logghe Bros.

Body and chassis
- Class: Top Fuel
- Body style: Streamliner slingshot dragster
- Related: None

Powertrain
- Engine: 427 Ford SOHC ("Cammer")

Chronology
- Predecessor: None
- Successor: None

Super Mustang is the name given to a Ford streamliner slingshot dragster project.

The project was begun by Ford's Styling Department in winter 1966, before the debut of the Cobra Jet the next year; the project was then turned over to Special Vehicles.

Designed by the team responsible for the Mustang, it used a Logghe Bros. chassis and a fuel injected SOHC 427 Ford, prepared by Ed Pink, Connie Kalitta and Tom Marsh, mated to an automatic transmission. The front axle mounted the usual bicycle wheels, while the rearend was a modified Jaguar IRS (when most dragsters used a solid-mounted axle) with limited-slip differential, plus coilover shocks and an anti-sway bar, along with the usual ladder bars. The body was a sleek wedge, designed by Ford Design Center and refined in Ford's wind tunnel, which enclosing the engine (except for the blower scoop), cockpit (which had a large canopy, but was "incredibly cramped"), and rear tires. It was designed by Ford and tested in a wind tunnel. The 150 in (3,800 mm)-wheelbase chassis was completed in December 1966 and bodied in California.

Driven by Tom McEwen, the car debuted at the 1967 Winternats, where, in one pass, it lost its canopy. Its best pass of the meet was an 8.60 at 180 mph (290 km/h).

Super Mustang never exceeded mid-8s at 180 mph (290 km/h), when contemporary conventional fuellers were turning in low-seven second passes at 220 mph (350 km/h).

The car's problems were never successfully solved, and after six months, it was parked. Though a poor race performer, the car was popular as a show vehicle.

The car was sold to Don and Joan Lyons of Dowagiac, Michigan, in 2003; they restored the car, and auctioned it off in 2009 for US$154,000.

== Sources ==
- Taylor, Thom. "Beauty Beyond the Twilight Zone" in Hot Rod, April 2017, pp. 30–43.
