= Logghe Stamping Company =

American racecar constructor

The Logghe Stamping Company (commonly known as Logghe Brothers) is a dragster and funny car fabricator based in Detroit, Michigan.

Logghe Brothers, operated by brothers Ron and Gene, was the first company to produce funny car chassis in series, beginning in 1966, when they built Don Nicholson's Eliminator I, with a reproduction Mercury Comet body provided by Fiberglass Trends. Similar cars were sold to Jack Chrisman, "Fast Eddie" Schartman, and Kenz and Leslie. These cars had the first coilover suspension in funny car.

In 1967, Logghe would provide the chassis for Ford's Super Mustang slingshot dragster project.

Butch Leal would body one of Logghe's first customer chassis with a fiberglass reproduction Plymouth Barracuda; this car's best pass would be a 7.82 at 182.16 mph (293.16 km/h), with a career win ratio of ninety percent.

Ron Ellis, running a gasser with supercharged Chrysler in a Logghe chassis, fitted a T-bucket, which he later exchanged for an AMX.

Gas Ronda used a Logghe chassis under his Mustang Mach 1 funny car; Ronda won the Orange County International Raceway Manufacturers Championship in 1969 in it.

Nicholson would fit a Pete Robinson-built Top Fuel SOHC 427. in his Logghe-built Comet early in the 1967 season and turn 7.90s at around 180 mph (290 km/h), earning an eighty-six percent winning record.

Texan Ken Hare had a Logghe-built 427 Chevy-powered AMC Javelin dubbed Ramblin' Rose .

In 1970, Logghe also built a 100 in (2,540 mm)-wheelbase AA/FA, Winged Express II, for "Wild Willie" Borsch.

Logghe ultimately proved unable to keep up with demand for chassis, leading to the creation of a funny car chassis-building industry, which was soon joined by Dick Fletcher, Don Hardy, Ronnie Scrima, and a number of others.

Late in 1969, Pat Foster and John Buttera would devise a Top Fuel dragster-style chassis to replace the "dune buggy" design common in Funny Car at the time. Similar chassis would be built by Logghe and Ronnie Scrima, among others; this design remains the standard in TF/FC.

Gene Snow would record the first official 200 mph (320 km/h) pass in the Logghe-chassised 1969 Dodge Charger, Rambunctious.

In 1973, Connie Kalitta ran a Logghe-chassised Ford Mustang as the Bounty Hunter, teamed with Shirley Muldowney (in the Buttera-chassied Bounty Huntress).

== Sources ==
- McClurg, Bob. "50 Years of Funny Cars: Part 2" in Drag Racer, November 2016, pp. 35–50.
- Taylor, Thom. "Beauty Beyond the Twilight Zone" in Hot Rod, April 2017, pp. 30–43.
