= Chuck Beal Racing =

American drag racing company

- Industry: Drag racing
- Headquarters: San Diego, California, United States
- Key people: Chuck Beal; Brandon Welch
- Website: chuckbealracing.com

Chuck Beal Racing is a drag racing company owned by professional drag racer Chuck Beal. The company is located in San Diego, California. Chuck Beal started as a racer of front- and rear-engine vehicles until he changed to the alcohol funny car class and then nitro-class vehicles. His grandson Brandon Welch took over the duties of racing his Funny Car after having graduated from Frank Hawley's Drag Racing School. He also serves as the Vice President of Marketing. Other racers who have raced for Chuck Beal include Jeff Arend and Jeff Diehl. The company's vehicles have multiple sponsors, including AutoAnything, UnderCover Truck Bed Covers, TruXedo Tonneau Covers, ProZ, and TruXP.

Chuck Beal has won multiple drag racing competitions; he won one each in the 1982 and 1983 Winternationals competition, and won multiple races in 1984. His vehicle was featured on the cover of the magazine National Dragster. In October 2015, Brandon Beach was announced to be participating in the National Hot Rod Association's Toyota Nationals in Las Vegas, Nevada, for which Beal has constructed a car for him to compete. He spent about 15 years as a crew member for Chuck Beal Racing before he was entered into a competition.

Chuck Beal and his Funny Car have received positive reception from editors in drag racing magazines. His vehicle was called "one of the most recognizable of the time" for Funny Car racing by National Dragster magazine in 1984, and an editor for the National Hot Rod Association's website recounted meeting Beal and remembering it fondly decades afterward.

At the 2015 NHRA Toyota Nationals at the Las Vegas Motor Speedway Brandon Welch made a full pass of 4.30 seconds in the 3rd qualifying session.

== History ==
Chuck Beal received a license to drag race in 1966. He started out racing in front- and rear-engine vehicles, and then switched to the alcohol funny car class. He would later move onto nitro-class cars after he rolled over in his alcohol car. He attempted to make his racing into a business throughout his career. The Chuck Beal Racing company is located in San Diego, California. In 2006, it was announced that Chuck Beal's grandson Brandon Welch would be driving the Beal Racing Nitro Funny Car in the 2007 NHRA competition. Beal and his company hosted an event called "Salute to Our Armed Forces", an open house dedicated to former and present members of the United States Navy and Marine Corps and the "Wounded Warriors Thursday". At the event, the members of the military and their families were able to see one of Beal's drag race cars and meet the staff.

Several drag racers have driven funny cars for Chuck Beal, including Jeff Arend (who now drag races for Jim Dunn Racing). One of Chuck Beal's racers, Jeff Diehl, was in an explosion while driving in Beal's nitro Funny Car during the Firebird Raceway NHRA National Time Trials event. Beal was quoted as saying " "It's a big, big dent in my pocketbook ... It was pretty devastating. It took out a brand-new TFX block. It may be salvageable, but it took out the crank and one head. The blower, obviously, is junk, but all of the safety equipment -- the blower and valve-cover restraints--did their job, so my hat is off to Deist. The body is cracked and will need to be repaired, but I've got a spare." In 2009, Beal and his crew finished work on a new car that was intended to help get Welch his competitive license. The completion of the vehicle was celebrated with a visit to the Cajon Classics Cruise Funny Car Frenzy at El Cajon, California. Chuck Beal Racing has multiple sponsors, including UnderCover Truck Bed Covers, TruXedo Tonneau Covers, ProZ, and TruXP.

=== Chuck Beal ===
Chuck Beal's regular career was as a nuclear-quality engineer. Chuck Beal's racing wins are typically in the west coast of the United States. Chuck Beal experienced back-to-back wins at the Winternationals in 1982 and 1983. In 1984, Beal won the Alcohol Funny Car portion of the Firebird International Raceway near Phoenix, Arizona, beating other racers such as Chris Christensen in the final lap. He also placed at the top at the Baylands Raceway in 1984, beating racers including Hans Kuesel. In a Division 6 competition for Top Alcohol Funny Car, Beal surpassed competitor Brad Anderson. In the first round of a Funny Car race event, Beal defeated competitor John Force. An editor for Drag Racing Online referred to the event and Beal's success as the "single most spectacular race of the event" and the "single biggest upset of the event", respectively. In 2017, Chuck Beal died from a heart complication.

=== Brandon Welch ===
Brandon Welch earned an undergraduate and master's degree from San Diego State University in business entertainment. He would later graduate from Frank Hawley's Drag Racing School, which contributed to Beal choosing him to race his Funny Car. also became the company's Vice President of Marketing. Before he served as VP of Marketing at Chuck Beal Racing, he was an account executive for JHG. His professional debut in Funny Car racing is slated to occur at the National Hot Rod Association's Toyota Nationals in Las Vegas, Nevada, following a hiatus from competition for the company. He will ride in a vehicle created by Beal specifically for Welch's use. Before entering this race, Welch had served as a crew member for Chuck Beal Racing for 15 years.

== Reception ==
In a 1984 issue of the magazine National Dragster, the author referred to Chuck Beal's funny car as being one of the most recognizable of the time. It was featured on the front cover of the magazine.
