= 1961 NHRA Winternationals =

- Venue: Pomona Raceway
- Location: Los Angeles County Fairgrounds

The 1961 NHRA Winternationals was a National Hot Rod Association (NHRA) drag racing event, held at Pomona Raceway at Los Angeles County Fairgrounds on 19 February.

== History ==
The 1961 Pomona event was NHRA's second to be called Winter Nationals; the first was held in Florida in 1960, in conjunction with NASCAR, and was not a success. It marked a return to NHRA's spiritual home: the association's rules had been written in Southern California, and LACF hosted NHRA's first ever national event, the Southern California Championships, in 1953.

NHRA's Wally Parks worked with the Pomona Valley Timing Association (PVTA) to organize the Winternats.

The Winternats were unusual for Southern California, due to NHRA's ban on nitromethane.

The prizes were modest: four 390 cu in (6,400 cc) Ford V8s, one each for the Top, Middle, Little, and Street Eliminator winners, with a gift certificate for a color television set to the Stock Eliminator winner. The trophies were paid for by model kit maker AMT.

== Results ==
Jack Chrisman (at the wheel of twin-Chevrolet-engined Howard Cam Special) took Top Eliminator over Tom "Mongoo$e" McEwen (driving for Dick Rea) with an 8.99 in the final.

Mickey Thompson won Middle Eliminator.

Little Eliminator went to Dick Manz (in the Larry Sanchez-owned car), beating Frank Pisano.

Street Eliminator was won by Johnny Loper over "Big John" Mazmanian (driving a Chevrolet Corvette).

Stock Eliminator was won by "Dyno Don" Nicholson, which got him his start in match racing.
