= Lori Johns =

Dragster driver (born 1965)

Lori Johns (born 1965) is a former Top Fuel Dragster racer. She won rookie of the year in 1985 and in 1990 became the third woman to win a NHRA Top Fuel event after Shirley Muldowney (1976) and Lucille Lee (1982).

== History ==
Johns was born in Corpus Christi, Texas.

At an NHRA National event, The Cajun Nationals, in Baton Rouge, Louisiana in May 1986, Johns suffered a serious injury after Jim Van Cleve's Budweiser sponsored Ford Mustang climbed a guardrail, flipped, and landed on Lori's roll cage, breaking her back and neck, which left her out of competition for two years. After undergoing five surgeries, Johns attended Frank Hawley's Drag Racing School.

Blaming Van Cleve for the accident, her father, Terry (a car dealer), sued. The suit was ultimately dropped, at Johns' request.

After learning to drive a Top Alcohol dragster, Johns went into Top Fuel racing, in a new car, supplied by her father, at a cost of US$125,000.

In trials with the new car, Johns, at age 23, turned in a pass of 5.03 seconds at 283 mph (455 km/h), making her one of the seven quickest drivers in Top Fuel at the time. At the time, she had entered only ten Top Fuel races, and had never reached a final round.

In 1991, as qualifications for the U.S. Nationals began, she was fourth in the standings.

She had a Revell model kit (#7496) of Johns' Jolly Rancher dragster. She was also the subject of an official NHRA trading card.
