= 1969 in motorsport =

The following is an overview of the events of 1969 in motorsport including the major racing events, motorsport venues that were opened and closed during a year, championships and non-championship events that were established and disestablished in a year, and births and deaths of racing drivers and other motorsport people.

== Annual events ==
The calendar includes only annual major non-championship events or annual events that had significance separate from the championship. For the dates of the championship events see related season articles.

Date	Event	Ref
1–2 February	8th 24 Hours of Daytona	
2 February	1969 NHRA Winternationals	
23 February	11th Daytona 500	
4 May	53rd Targa Florio	
18 May	27th Monaco Grand Prix	
30 May	53rd Indianapolis 500	
7–13 June	51st Isle of Man TT	
14–15 June	37th 24 Hours of Le Mans	
26–27 July	21st 24 Hours of Spa	
5 October	10th Hardie-Ferodo 500	
16 November	16th Macau Grand Prix	

== Births ==
Date	Month	Name	Nationality	Occupation	Note	Ref
3	January	Michael Schumacher	German	Racing driver	Formula One World Champion (1994-1995, 2000-2004).	
30	March	Troy Bayliss	Australian	Motorcycle racer	Superbike World champion (2001, 2006, 2008).	
23	May	Laurent Aïello	French	Racing driver	24 Hours of Le Mans winner (1998).	
24	May	Mendy Fry	American	Drag racer		
16	August	Yvan Müller	French	Racing driver	Champion of the BTCC in 2003 and 2008, 2010-2011, 2013	
3	September	Jörg Müller	German	Racing driver	1993 Macau Grand Prix winner.	
23	November	Olivier Beretta	Monégasque	Racing driver	1999 FIA GT Champion, 2000 24 Hours of Daytona winner.	
29	December	Allan McNish	British	Racing driver	24 Hours of Le Mans winner (1998, 2008, 2013). FIA World Endurance champion (2013).	

== Deaths ==
Date	Month	Name	Age	Nationality	Occupation	Note	Ref
30	March	Lucien Bianchi	34	Belgian	Racing driver	24 Hours of Le Mans winner (1968).	
27	July	Moisés Solana	33	Mexican	Racing driver		

== See also ==
- List of 1969 motorsport champions
