= 1964 NHRA Winternationals =

National Hot Rod Association
- Venue: Auto Club Raceway
- Location: Pomona, California

The 1964 NHRA Winternationals (commonly known as the Winternats) were a National Hot Rod Association (NHRA) drag racing event, held at Auto Club Raceway, Pomona, California on 16 February.

== Results ==
=== Top Fuel ===
==== Round One ====
Don "Big Daddy" Garlits attended, but Swamp Rat VI-A failed to qualify; Garlits, however, took over the Weekly-Rivero-Fox-Holding dragster qualified by Norm Weekly. He eliminated Bobby Vodnik. Denny Milani lost to Chris "The Greek" Karamesines, while "TV Tommy" Ivo defeated Jim Warren.

==== Round Two ====
Garlits fell to Kenny Safford. Karamesines lost to Ivo.

==== Semi-final ====
Ivo defeated Safford.

==== Final ====
Ivo faced Jack Williams, and lost.

=== Top Gas ===
Danny Ongais, driving a Roland Leong-owned Chevrolet, defeated Mickey Thompson's Ford.

=== Altered ===
The Comp Eliminator (Altered) title went to Charlie Smith, in a Chevrolet-powered 1923 Model T, over the Chevrolet-powered 1932 Bantam of Ed Weddle.

=== Stock Experimental ===
Ronnie Sox took the S/X win over "Dyno Don" Nicholson, both driving 1964 Mercury Comets.

=== Top Stock ===
The T/S title went to Tommy Grove, who defeated Doug Lovegrove.

=== Street Eliminator ===
The Street Eliminator win went to Ron Rootyl in a 1963 Dodge, defeating Norman Armstrong in a Chevrolet-powered 1939 Willys.
