= Carl Olson (drag racer) =

American Top Fuel Dragster driver

- Nationality: American

Top Fuel Dragster

Carl Olson is an American Top Fuel Dragster driver.

== Career ==
=== 1969 ===
Olson entered the 1969 NHRA Winternationals at Auto Club Raceway in Pomona, California, but failed to qualify.

=== 1970 ===
At the 1970 Winternationals, Olson qualified #4, but was eliminated in round two by #12 qualifier Jim Davis.

=== 1971 ===
Olson qualified #30 at the 1971 Winternationals. He was eliminated in the quarter-final by Don Garlits. He also entered the 1971 AHRA Winter Nationals at Beeline Dragway in Scottsdale, Arizona. He qualified #15, and lost in the semi-final to Chris "the Greek" Karamesines. The semi-final finish paid Olson US$400.

Olson also entered the 1971 NHRA U.S. Nationals at Indianapolis Raceway Park in Clermont, Indiana, where he was #3 qualifier, and lost in the sei-final to top qualifier Garlits in Swamp Rat 14. His final 1972 Top Fuel event was the Supernationals at Ontario Motor Speedway, in Ontario, California; Olson qualified #13, and went out in round two to #21 qualifier Tony Nancy.

=== 1972 ===
At Lions Drag Strip, Wilmington, California, in 1972, Olson qualified #9 for the NHRA Division 7 Le Grand Premiere, and was eliminated in round one by #1 qualifier Don Prudhomme. Olson was paid uS$150.

Olson qualified #29 for the 1972 NHRA Winternationals; he defeated Karamesines in round one, Tony Nancy in round two, Dwight Salisbury in round three, and Gary Cochran in the semi-final, on the way to a final round win over #2 qualifier Dennis Baca, and taking a US$11,075 purse. At the NHRA Division 7 All Pro Championship Series at Orange County International Raceway (OCIR), in Irvine, California, on 13 February, Olson lost to Clayton Harris, taking a purse of US$750.

At the 25 March Division 7 event at OCIR, he lost in the final to Prudhomme. At Dallas International Motor Speedway in June, Olson reached the final in the 1972 IHRA Longhorn Nationals, losing in the final to top qualifier "TV Tommy" Ivo.

Olson qualified #1 at the 1972 NHRA Springnationals in Hebron, Ohio, making it to the final before losing to #1 qualifier Chip Woodall (in the Gene Snow fueller). At the 1972 NHRA Summernationals at Old Bridge Township Raceway Park in Englishtown, New Jersey, Olson qualified #3, and defeated #11 qualifier Arnie Behling in round one and #15 qualifier Larry Bucher in round two, before losing to #5 qualifier (and eventual winner) Jeb Allen in the quarter-final. Le Grandnational at Sanair in Saint-Pie, Quebec, saw Olson reach the semi-final, before being eliminated by eventual event winner Art Marshall.

Olson qualified #6 for the 1972 U.S. Nats at Indianapolis, being eliminated in the semi-final by #3 qualifier Jerry Ruth.

The 1972 INRA U.S. Open at North Carolina Motor Speedway in Rockingham, North Carolina, was a success for Olson, defeating Flip Schofield in round three, Garlits in the semi, and Ivo in the final; the scheduled final was rained out, and had to be run the next day.

Dallas International Motor Speedway hosted the 1972 IHRA Nationals in Lewisville, Texas. Olson defeated Schofield in the final.

Olson returned to Ontario Motor Speedway for the 1972 NHRA Supernationals, beating Randy Allison (in round one) and Herman Petersen, before being eliminated by eventual winner Don Moody in the semi-final. Olson took a US$1500 purse.

=== 1973 ===
At Pomona in 1973, Olson qualified #33. He was eliminated in the second round by #12 qualifier Dennis Baca.

Olson qualified #1 for the Gatornationals at Gainesville Raceway in Gainesville, Florida, but failed to run.

Along with Peterson and Jim Bucher, Olson failed to make the field for the Springnationals.

Olson reached the final at the U.S. Nationals, losing to Gary Beck.

The 1973 NHRA World Finals at Amarillo Dragway in Amarillo, Texas were another disappointment; though qualifying #2, and beating #10 qualifier Bucher in round one, Olson lost to Phil Hobbs in the quarter-final round.

At the final race of the 1973 season, the NHRA Supernationals at Ontario, Olson qualified #9, only to be eliminated in round one by #1 qualifier (and eventual event winner) Garlits (in Swamp Rat 19).

=== 1974 ===
Olson started his final Top Fuel season at the Gatornationals. He qualified #8, and was eliminated by #16 qualifier Petersen in round one.

He qualified #1 at the Springnationals, defeating Bucher in the semi-final to meet #2 qualifier Beck in the final, which Olson lost.

Olson attended the Summernationals in Englishtown, but failed to qualify.

At the U.S. Nationals, Olson qualified #4, but lost in round one to #20 qualifier Grant Stoms.

Olson's last TF/D start was the Supernationals. He qualified #14, and lost in round one to #6 qualifier Sarge Arciero.
