= Ed Donovan (engine builder) =

American engine builder (1928–1989)

Ed Donovan (1928–1989), commonly called "The Mole" (or "Pachy"), was an American racing engine and parts builder.

Donovan developed the first all-aluminum-block hemi designed specifically for Top Fuel drag racing.

Donovan was posthumously inducted into the Motorsports Hall of Fame of America in 2003.

== Early life ==
Ed Donovan was born 1928 in Los Angeles. He was fascinated with engines from an early age.

While working for Offenhauser, Donovan became involved in drag racing, before branching out on his own.

== Engine builder ==
Donovan's company, Donovan Engineering, was started in 1957. He supplied top racers, including "Dyno Don" Nicholson. Donovan, along with Leo Goossen, built the first two-disk racing clutch, the first titanium valves (for which Nicholson was his first customer), and other gear.

In 1964, Donovan built the "vaunted" Donovan Engineering Special, hiring Tom McEwen (who Donovan nicknamed "Mongoose") to drive it.

Donovan is best known for his 417 cu in (6,830 cc) hemi, introduced in 1971. He copied the Chrysler 392 cu in (6,420 cc), which he admired, but tried to eliminate its flaws. He developed the aluminum hemi to overcome the tendency of 392 cu in (6,420 cc) Chryslers, then used by Top Fuel racers (many of them friends and customers of his), to crack their iron blocks. The first driver to use the Donovan hemi (fresh out of the milling machine) was "Kansas John" Wiebe, at the 1971 NHRA Super Nationals, where Wiebe very nearly won Top Fuel.

In 1977, Donovan persuaded "Big Daddy" Don Garlits to switch from the 426 hemi he had been using for the last thirteen years to the 417 cu in (6,830 cc), offering (in Garlits' words) “an engine deal I couldn't refuse”.

Donovan also built the only aluminum-block aftermarket copy of the 350 cu in (5,700 cc) small-block Chevy to successfully finish the Indianapolis 500. He also copied the 427 cu in (7,000 cc) and 454 cu in (7,440 cc) big-blocks.

Donovan made little money on his developments, despite the fact the aluminum hemi becoming the effective standard drag racing engine for a generation.

== Personal life ==
Donovan was famously generous, always paying restaurant bills, and was willing to give his employees ("his boys") even the very shirt off his back. He also demonstrated fierce loyalty.

In addition, Donovan was a music lover, gourmet chef, and wine connoisseur of fine wine.

Donovan's sense of humor was quirky; he once claimed to hate the name Joe, listing examples such as Paisano, Hrudka, and Mondello.

Donovan was 61 when he died of cancer.

Donovan was posthumously inducted into the Motorsports Hall of Fame of America in 2003.

== Sources ==
- Obituary. Hot Rod, September 1989, pp. 132–133.
