= Beeline Dragway =

Former drag racing facility in Mesa, Arizona

- Location: Mesa, Arizona, United States
- Coordinates: 33°30′28″N 111°45′38″W
- Capacity: 2,000
- Address: State Route 87 between Gilbert and N. Val Vista Dr.
- Broke ground: July 20, 1963
- Opened: 1963
- Closed: 1975

Drag Strip
- Surface: Asphalt
- Length: 0.25 miles (0.402 km)

The Beeline Dragway was a drag racing facility in Mesa, Arizona that operated from 1963 to the 1980s. Situated approximately one mile north of Mesa along State Highway 87, the track was named after the Beeline Highway, which connected Mesa to Payson and was known for its straight path.

Drag racer Jim Rodgers built the track on land leased from the Salt River Pima Indian tribe. Beeline Dragway featured a pair of quarter-mile asphalt lanes designed for high-speed drag racing. During the 1960s and early 1970s, the facility attracted thousands of spectators and hosted major events such as the American Hot Rod Association (AHRA) Winternationals. Renowned drivers, including Don "Big Daddy" Garlits, "Dandy" Dick Landy, and Tom McEwen, competed at Beeline.

== Legacy and Future Use ==
After its closure, Beeline Dragway remained largely abandoned, with the three-story concrete and steel timing tower standing as the sole remnant of the facility's racing past. Over the years, the tower became a canvas for graffiti artists and a subject of urban exploration

The Salt River Pima Indian tribe plans to restore the property to its natural state to use it for cultural ceremonies and open space.
