= Dick Landy =

Dick Landy, nicknamed "Dandy Dick", was an American drag racer.

In 1965, Landy's Dodge Coronet A/Factory Experimental (A/FX) entry, was one of the first to compete in what would later become the Funny Car class.

Landy won the Street class at the Winternats in 1968, following with a win in Modified (Altered) there in 1969. At the 1970 Winternationals, he beat Herb McCandless' Plymouth Duster, when McCandless redlighted.

Landy would reach a final round only once more, at the 1972 NHRA Summernationals at Englishtown, New Jersey; he would lose to Grumpy Jenkins.

Landy died on January 11, 2007, at the age of 69.
