= Sandy Elliot =

Howard James "Sandy" Elliot (d. February 14, 2015) was a Canadian drag racer who was inducted into the Canadian Motorsport Hall of Fame in 1998. He was born in Oil Springs, Ontario and died in Chatham, Ontario. He was the principal of Sandy Elliot Racing out of Chatham, Ontario. They gained their greatest notoriety in the late 1960s and early 1970s when the team was nicknamed the Border Bandits because they would race at the tracks over the American border in the Super Stock categories and would often win. Although Elliot's first high-profile car was a station wagon painted red, the team developed the distinctive colours of Red in the front of the car and the back one third of the cars were a slanted black and white pattern. Elliot owned a Ford dealership at the time and consequently the cars were all Ford products. In 1971, the team set nine NHRA records. The fame of the team was such that American Muscle produced a 1:18 scale model of Elliot's 1968 Ford Mustang which was sold through Toys "R" Us.
