= Tom McEwen (drag racer) =

American dragster driver (1937–2018)

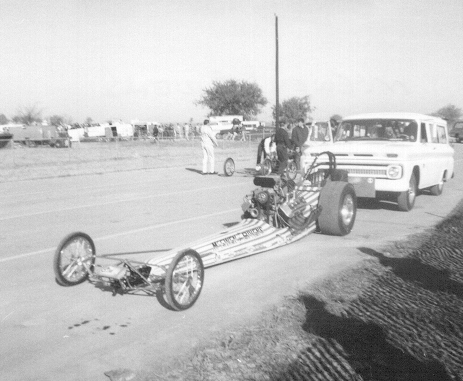
- McEwen's 1967 slingshot rail
- Born: Thomas McEwen Sr. January 14, 1937 Pensacola, Florida, U.S.
- Died: June 10, 2018 (aged 81) Fountain Valley, California, U.S.

NHRA Top Fuel Funny Car

Awards
- 2014 2001: International Motorsports Hall of Fame; Motorsports Hall of Fame of America

Thomas McEwen Sr. (January 14, 1937 – June 10, 2018) was an American drag racer who was a winner of the National Hot Rod Association (NHRA) U.S. Nationals. His racing career spanned 45 years. He is ranked at number 16 on a list of the 50 most significant drivers of NHRA's first 50 years.

Starting as an owner-driver, he received the nickname "the Mongoose" in 1964 from engine builder Ed Donovan, after McEwen signed up to drive Donovan's "vaunted" Donovan Engineering Special. It was originally used as a device to entice Don "the Snake" Prudhomme into a high-exposure match race.

After trouble getting the Gilmore Engineering-chassied Donovan dragster sorted out, McEwen quit (replaced by Prudhomme, no less) to drive for Lou Beney, in the Yeakel Plymouth dragster. (Baney also conceived McEwen's mid-engined Hemi 'Cuda funny car.)

In 1965, he faced Hot Wheels teammate Prudhomme at the Hot Rod Magazine Championship Drag Races, held at Riverside Raceway, "one of the most significant drag racing events" of that era; the Top Fuel Eliminator (TFE) trophy that year went to Jim Warren.

McEwen also drove the ill-fated Super Mustang at its debut at the 1967 Winternats.

Leaving the Super Mustang, McEwen joined the Bivens & Fisher team, driving their Checkmate dragster, and soon set an NHRA national record.

McEwen won five NHRA national events, but his gift for gab and promotional ability made him one of the sport's most influential and controversial figures.

As stated by Roland Leong, "McEwen was the smartest of the bunch. When he came up with the Hot Wheels deal using the Snake and Mongoose characters, it shook the world of drag racing big time. He produced a sponsorship package that allowed him and Prudhomme to buy the best equipment, pay expenses, make money and sell their image all over the United States. I hate to admit it but McEwen and Prudhomme showed us the way to the future. They were a lot smarter than most of us who didn't see past the end of the quarter-mile."

McEwen had four children: Jamie, Joe, Tom Jr., and Kathleen, and two grandchildren: Christian and Jonathan. Jamie and Joe are deceased.

== Early career ==
McEwen gained his early experience in a variety of cars, beginning in 1953 with a '53 Oldsmobile at Santa Ana Drags in Irvine. He then went on to race a '54 Olds at Lions Drag Strip in Long Beach.

McEwen went from the stock ranks to gas coupes, Altereds, and eventually dragsters and funny cars. Among the cars he drove were the Stone-Woods-Cook '50 Olds fastback, the Bader and Ferrara Cadillac-powered Crosseyed Crosley, Art Chrisman's Hustler II, the Bud Rasner and Gary Slusser Fiat coupe, Dick Rea's Chrysler-powered supercharged gas dragster, and Gene Adams' Albertson Olds.

== 1960s ==
McEwen continued his relationship with Adams for several years. In 1962, he drove Adams' Shark, which was one of the first dragsters to use a streamlined body with an enclosed parachute pack. This would turn out to be one of McEwen's best known rides.

In 1963, McEwen achieved his first major success when he a runner-up finish against Art Malone at the Bakersfield March Meet in California in the Broussard-Garrison-Purcell-Davis car. He also drove Donovan's Donovan Engineering Special, and it was in this car he first raced Prudhomme.

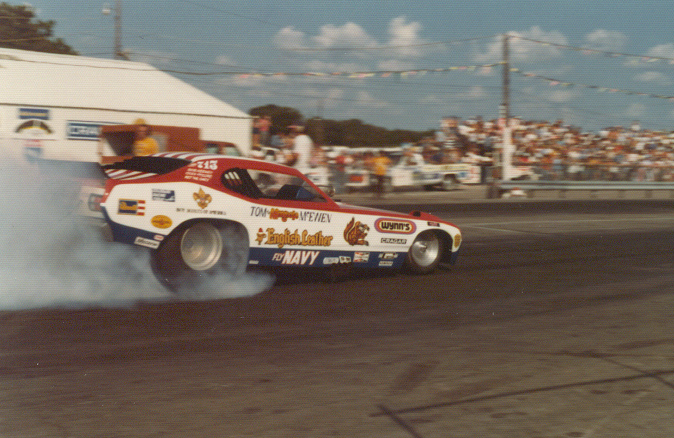
McEwen's 1975 funny car

McEwen won the race against Prudhomme at Lions Drag Strip on September 12, 1964. He beat overcame Prudhomme's bright-orange edition of the famed Greer-Black-Prudhomme car two outings in a row, inspiring what may be the most famous match-race pairing in the history of drag racing.

Later in 1964, McEwen drove Lou Baney's Yeakel Plymouth-sponsored dragster to victory at the 32-car UDRA meet at Fontana Raceway in Fontana. He also took Top Fuel honors at Lions Dragstrip and Pomona Raceway.

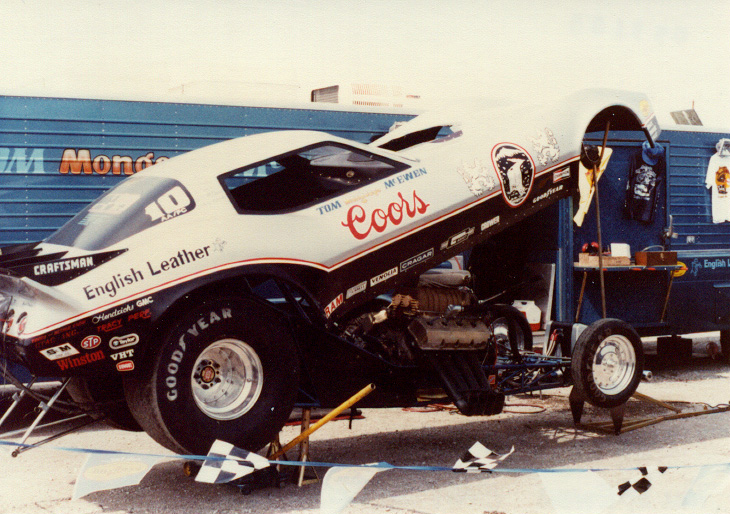
McEwen's 1980 funny car

Because their first contest had received so much attention, two more races between McEwen and Prudhomme were staged at Lions Drag Strip in 1965. McEwen drove the Yeakel Plymouth dragster past Prudhomme and his new ride, the Leong-owned Hawaiian, two rounds to one in the first, then lost in two straight sets in the second.

Because McEwen raced only on the West Coast, he and the touring Prudhomme faced each other only once in 1966, at the Winternationals, site of their first national event meeting. There, Prudhomme in the B&M Torkmaster Special took the win, with a 7.59 e.t. to McEwen's 7.69. They would not meet again for the rest of the decade.

McEwen won the 1966 Hot Rod Magazine Championships at Riverside Raceway and then went on to win the 1968 Stardust National Open in Las Vegas. He also recorded the lowest ever elapsed time to date with a blistering 6.64 at the Orange County PDA Meet in 1968.

=== The promoter ===
McEwen also continued to build on his reputation as a colorful promoter. The Plymouth Hemi Cuda he unveiled in 1965 was featured in every major car magazine. He convinced the Southern California Plymouth Dealers Association to support him and displayed the car all over the West Coast.

In 1967, McEwen took the same approach with one of drag racing's great one-shot wonders, Ford's Super Mustang. The car stole the show when it made its debut at the Winternationals.

==== Wildlife Racing ====
McEwen's strong promotional talent and Prudhomme's success on the strip eventually led the two to form a national touring team, sponsored by the toy company Mattel, and in mid-1969, McEwen and Prudhomme became co-owners of "Wildlife Racing." The Mattel Hot Wheels sponsorship deal ran from 1970 through 1972. Wildlife Racing then signed with Care Free Sugarless Gum as a sponsor in 1973. McEwen and Prudhomme dissolved their partnership at the end of the 1973 season.

== 1970s ==
In 1972, McEwen won his first major event when he dominated the Top Fuel field at the Bakersfield March Meet. A year later, he scored his first NHRA national event victory by topping the quickest Funny Car field in history at the SuperNationals at Ontario Motor Speedway.

He went on to win four more national events, including his dramatic U.S. Nationals Funny Car victory over Prudhomme in 1978. The win came only a few days after the death of his son Jamie, who had battled leukemia.

== Later life ==
McEwen won the AHRA World Finals at Spokane Raceway Park in 1982, the prestigious Big Bud Shootout in 1984, and Top Fuel at the 1991 Summernationals at Englishtown, New Jersey.

McEwen solved his Corvette funny car's stability problems by adding tip fences to the rear spoiler.

McEwen's "gorgeous" 1957 Chevy replica was built as a tribute to the iconic Chevrolet. It was run as an NHRA exhibition vehicle and was responsible for creating Nostalgia Funny Car, even though the car would not (now) be legal in that class. The car ran just three years, and was popular with fans and media alike.

McEwen retired from racing in 1992, and later worked as motorsports director for "Drag Racer" magazine, based in Southern California.

McEwen was inducted into the Motorsports Hall of Fame of America in 2001.

== Death ==
McEwen died of Acute Cardiopulmonary arrest on June 10, 2018, at the age of 81.

== 2013 film ==
Snake and Mongoose, a movie portraying the story of Prudhomme and McEwen, was released in the summer of 2013. It tells the story of the rivalry between the two great Southern California racers.

== Sources ==
- McClurg, Bob. "50 Years of Funny Cars: Part 2" in Drag Racer, November 2016, pp. 35–50.
- Burk, Jeff. "50 Years of Funny Cars: Part 3" in Drag Racer, November 2016, pp. 52–64.
