= Shirley Muldowney =

NHRA champion, drag racing pioneer

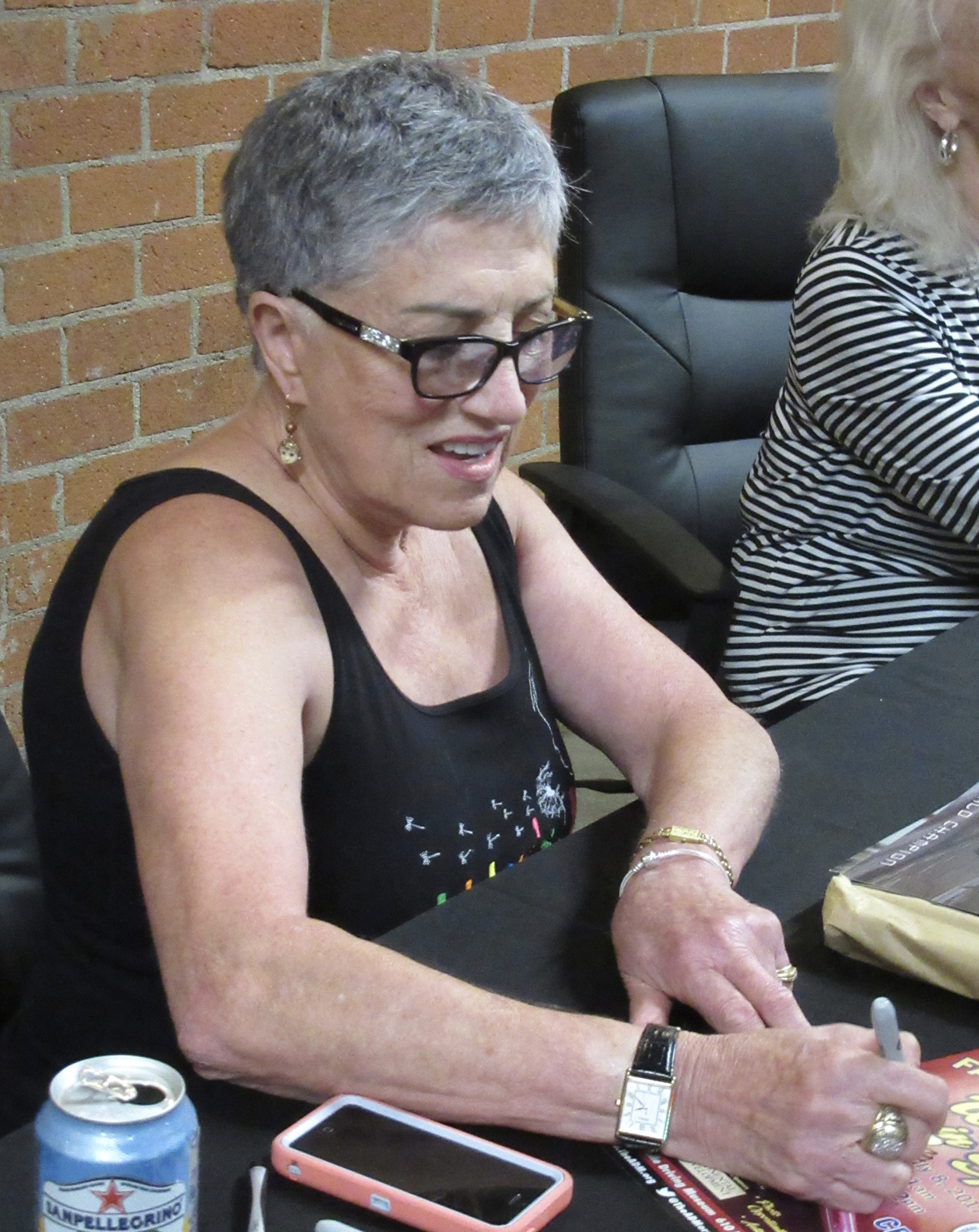
- Muldowney signing autographs in July 2017 at the Automobile Driving Museum
- Born: Shirley Ann Roque; June 19, 1940 (age 86) Burlington, Vermont, U.S.
- Debut season: 1958

NHRA
- Championships: 3 (TF)
- Wins: 18

Previous series
- IHRA

Championship titles
- 1977, 1980, 1982: NHRA Top Fuel Champion

Awards
- 1990 2001 2004: Motorsports Hall of Fame of America; NHRA Top 50 Drivers of 1951–2000; International Motor Sports Hall of Fame

Shirley Muldowney (born June 19, 1940), also known professionally as "Cha Cha" and the "First Lady of Drag Racing", is an American auto racer. She was the first woman to receive a license from the National Hot Rod Association (NHRA) to drive a Top Fuel dragster. She won the NHRA Top Fuel championship in 1977, 1980, and 1982, becoming the first person to win two and three Top Fuel titles. She won a total of 18 NHRA national events.

== Racing career ==
Born Shirley Ann Roque in Burlington, Vermont, on June 19, 1940, Muldowney began street racing in the 1950s in Schenectady, New York. "School had no appeal to me. All I wanted was to race up and down the streets in a hot rod," declared Muldowney. When she was 16, she married 19-year-old Jack Muldowney, who built her first dragster.

It was Jack Muldowney who first taught me how to drive a car. Jack was the mechanic. He was the guy who tuned the cars that let the girl beat all the boys. I was a kid from upstate New York with no guidance, no direction. I was headed for trouble, nothing going for me. Then I found the sport at a very young age and was able to make something out of it.

In 1958, Muldowney made her debut on the dragstrip of the Fonda Speedway. She obtained her NHRA pro license in 1965. She competed in the 1969 and 1970 U.S. Nationals in a twin-engined dragster in Top Gas. With Top Gas losing popularity, Muldowney switched to Funny Car, buying her first car from Connie Kalitta.

Around this time, Muldowney and her husband drifted apart; they finally divorced in 1972. "He didn't want to go nitro racing and we parted, but we stayed friends all those years until he passed away [in 2007]," she later said.

Muldowney won her first major event, the International Hot Rod Association (IHRA) Southern Nationals, in 1971.

Muldowney stepped up to Top Fuel, getting her license in 1973 (making her the first woman to do it), behind the wheel of Poncho Rendon's digger; Don Garlits signed her application, one of three signatures she needed to make it official; the other two were Tommy Ivo and Connie Kalitta. From 1973 to 1977, she teamed up with Kalitta as the Bounty Hunter and Bounty Huntress in match races, in a pair of Ford Mustangs, hers a Buttera chassis, and his a Logghe. The Bounty Huntress Mustang caught fire at Dragway 42 in Ohio in 1973.

In Columbus, Ohio, in 1976, Muldowney dominated Top Fuel, qualifying number-one by 0.05 second, setting low elapsed time (ET) and top speed of the meet, having the low ET in every round, breaking her own top speed record in the final, and winning the class. An unprecedented three NHRA Top Fuel Dragster world championships followed, in 1977, 1980, and 1982.

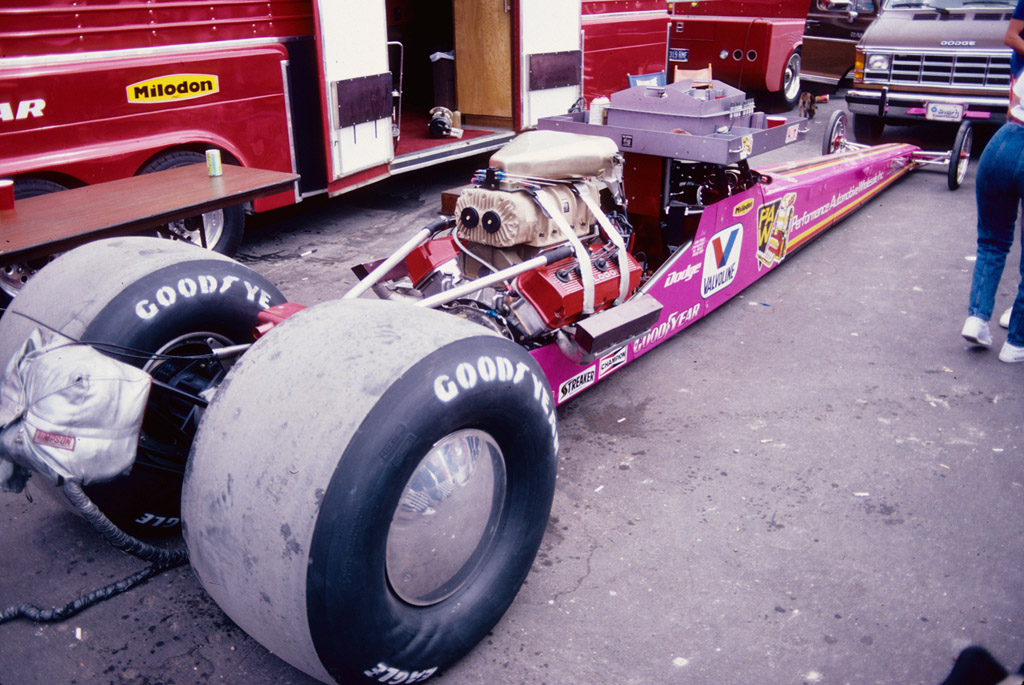
Muldowney's 1986 dragster

Muldowney's success met enormous opposition from those who felt drag racing (or any form of motorsport, for that matter) was no place for women. Garlits has said about her:

Now, if you ask who do I have the most respect for, I'd say Shirley Muldowney. She went against all odds. They didn't want her to race Top Fuel, the association, the racers, nobody...just Shirley.

Muldowney noted, "NHRA fought me every inch of the way, but when they saw how a girl could fill the stands; they saw I was good for the sport."

A crash in 1984 crushed Muldowney's hands, pelvis, and legs, necessitating half a dozen operations and 18 months of therapy. She was sidelined for a long period, but returned to the circuit in the late 1980s. She appeared on the Tonight Show with Johnny Carson on Feb. 21, 1986, walking with a cane. She continued to race, mostly without major sponsorship, throughout the 1990s in IHRA competition, as well as match-racing events. She returned to the NHRA towards the end of her career, running select events until her retirement at the end of 2003.

Muldowney was described by longtime drag racer Fred Farndon as the "best 'natural' driver (top fuel or funny car), no question."

Muldowney's recent activities include the dictation of her memoirs, Shirley Muldowney's Tales from the Track, which Bill Stephens transcribed, and which Sports Publishing L.L.C. published in 2005.

== Health issues ==
In March 2016, Muldowney disregarded a cancer scare to be the official starter of the Amalie Oil NHRA Gatornationals. Having been given a diagnosis of lung cancer prior to the event, Muldowney was later given a diagnosis of histoplasmosis, a curable and nonmalignant fungal infection that can mimic cancer.

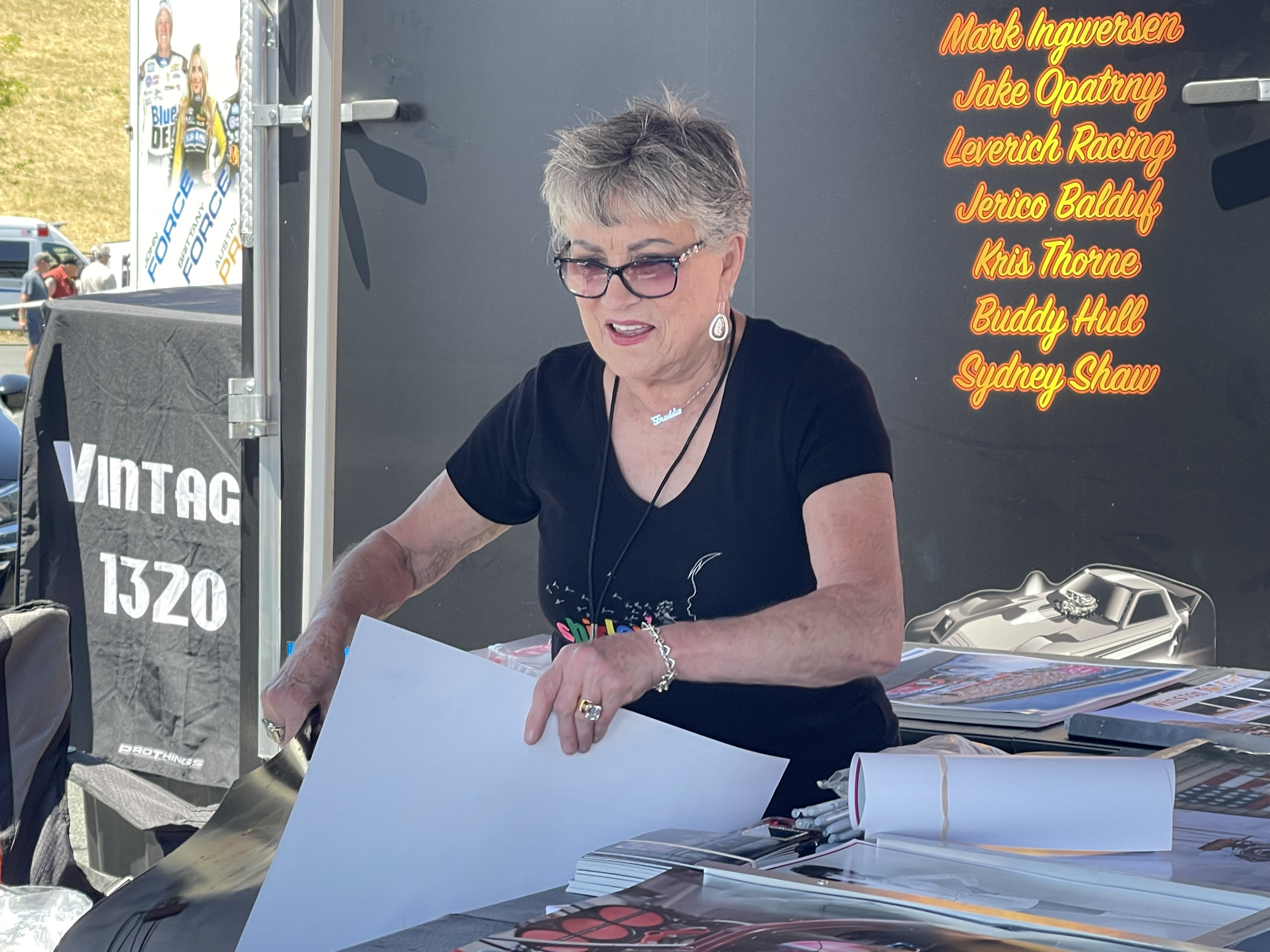
Muldowney selling photographs to benefit her nonprofit, Shirley's Kids, at the 2023 DENSO NHRA Sonoma Nationals.

== Shirley's Kids ==
Muldowney operates a charitable organization, Shirley's Kids, which helps children in need in cities where drag racing is part of the community.

== Film depiction ==
The 1983 biopic Heart Like a Wheel, about Muldowney's life and career, starred Bonnie Bedelia. Muldowney would rather have had Jamie Lee Curtis play her; she called Bedelia "a snot," and stated, "When she was promoting the movie on TV shows, she would tell interviewers she didn't even like racing. She got out of race car [sic] like she was getting up from the dinner table." Muldowney had mixed feelings about the film itself, stating, "No, the movie did not capture my life very well at all, but more importantly, I thought the movie was very, very good for the sport."

== Awards and honors ==
- In 1975, she was voted the first woman member of the 10-person Auto Racing All-American team by the American Auto Racing Writers and Broadcasters Association.
- In 1976, she was named Drag News Top Fuel Driver of the Year and voted to the Auto Racing All-American Team for the second time.
- In 1977, she won the NHRA Winston world points championship, becoming the first woman to claim drag racing's most prestigious title. She was the recipient of "Outstanding Achievement Award" from the United States House of Representatives on October 14, 1977, and was named the Drag News Top Fuel Driver of the Year for the second straight season. Shirley also was named Car Craft magazine Person of the Year during the annual Car Craft Awards Banquet, Indianapolis, Indiana. She was the first Top Fuel driver to win three NHRA national events back-to-back.
- She was the NHRA Winston world points championship for the second time in 1980.
- The next year, she won the AHRA world championship and was voted to Auto Racing All-American team for the fifth time. Car Craft selected her to the All-Star Team, and Top Fuel Driver of the Year, for the second year in a row.
- In 1982, she won the NHRA Winston points championship, becoming the first person to claim drag racing's most prestigious title three times. She was voted to the Auto Racing All-American Team for the fifth time.
- In 1989, she was inducted into the Michigan Motorsports Hall of Fame. www.mmshof.org
- In 1990, she was inducted into the Motorsports Hall of Fame of America.
- In 2001, she was ranked number five on the National Hot Rod Association's 50th-Anniversary list of its Top 50 Drivers, 1951-2000.
- In 2004, she was inducted into the International Motorsports Hall of Fame.
- In 2005, she was inducted into the Automotive Hall of Fame.
- In 2008, ESPN ranked her 21st on its list of the Top 25 Drivers of All Time, citing her record as the first woman to win a major racing championship.

== In popular culture ==
Muldowney's name appears in the lyrics of the Le Tigre song "Hot Topic." Samples from the movie made about Shirley are heard in the lyrics of the L7 song "Shirley" on the Hungry for Stink album. The song "Run, Run, Run" by Patti Scialfa is about Muldowney. Her name also appears in the 1987 Michael Cooper (of Con Funk Shun) song Quickness "with the Shirley Muldowney-es of Quickness". Her photo also appears on the cover of Soul Asylum's 2024 album, Slowly But Shirley.

=== Crypto Currency ===
On October 7, 2022 the NHRA Coin Shirley Muldowney Edition NFT became available on the OpenSea NFT Marketplace.

== Sources ==
- McClurg, Bob. “50 Years of Funny Cars: Part 2” in Drag Racer, November 2016, pp. 35–50.
