= Jack Chrisman =

American racing driver (1928–1989)

- Nationality: American
- Born: 5 May 1928 Grove, Oklahoma, U.S.
- Retired: 1972

NHRA
- Years active: 1953–1972
- Teams: self-owned, Mickey Thompson, Howard Cams and Chuck Jones
- Best finish: 1st in 1961

Championship titles
- 1961 NHRA Top Eliminator (Top Gas)

Awards
- ranked 23rd on NHRA's Top 50 drivers (2001); Inducted into the Motorsports Hall of Fame of America in 2013.

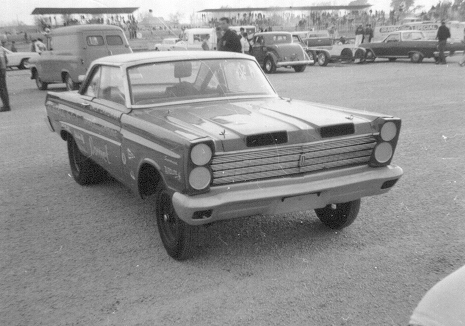
Chrisman's Comet with a 427 engine

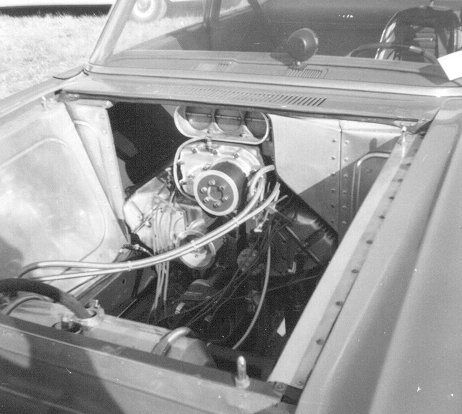
Chrisman's 427 engine

Jack Chrisman (May 5, 1928 – August 17, 1989) was an American drag racer. He was a drag racing pioneer and 1961 champion. He was influential in the formation of the Funny Car class, as he introduced the first blown injected nitro-burning Funny Car. The National Hot Rod Association (NHRA) ranked Chrisman 23rd on their Top 50 drivers in 2001.

== Background ==
Chrisman was born the youngest of 13 children in Grove, Oklahoma. The family moved to Southern California to escape the Dust Bowl.

== Racing career ==
Chrisman began drag racing in 1953 when he raced a 1929 Model A. He switched to a Chrysler car, continuing to race at Southern California such as Lions, Pomona, San Fernando, Santa Ana, and Saugus. He purchased the Purple Car from Ed Lusinski, and used the car to win drag races at many of these tracks. He started racing Top Fuel for Pat Akins. Masters & Richter flew Chrisman to the Bay area to race in their Top Fuel dragster.

In 1959, Chrisman started racing in Chuck Jones Sidewinder dragster. The car, wrenched by Joe Maillard, had its motor mounded sideways. It was shorter than the 100-inch (254 cm) common at that time. The car consistently recorded 9.0 second elapsed times (e.t.) at 160 miles per hour (260 km/h), which typically defeated local competition.

In late 1960, Chrisman moved to Howard Johansen's team. He raced the Howard Cam Twin Bears gas dragster, which featured two side-mounted engines. In 1961, he used the car for the first 8-second run in NHRA national event history, when his 8.99 second pass beat Dick Rea in the Top Eliminator (Top Gas) final at the first Winternationals. That summer he drove to an 8.78 e.t. at Caddo Mills, Texas, which was the lowest e.t. of the year. Chrisman won the 1961 World Championship after winning in national, regional, and divisional meets throughout the United States.

Chrisman changed to Mickey Thompson's team in 1962. The Tommy Ivo-built machine ran on either gas or nitro. Chrisman set new top speed record of 176.60 miles per hour (284.21 km/h) at York, Pennsylvania and a new e.t. record in A/GD (A/Gas Dragster) with an 8.34 second pass. The team debuted a new Pontiac Hemi engine a few weeks before the U.S. Nationals at Indy, and won the Top Eliminator crown.

During a regular afternoon event at Pomona in May 1963, the dragster's rear end broke. Chrisman spent 42 days in the hospital recovering. After he had recovered, he started working advertising for National Dragster. Chrisman intended to drive Thompson's dragster to defend his title at Indianapolis, but Thompson's hauler tipped over while transporting the vehicle to the dragstrip.

=== Funny Car pioneer ===
Chrisman was working for the NHRA in late 1963 or early 1964 when Ford's Fran Hernandez gave a Mercury Comet to Chrisman. After Chrisman did not race it, Hernandez asked, "What's going to get you to race that car?" Chrisman responded he wanted a blower to be installed in the car. Chrisman went to a dealer, picked up the racecar, and brought it to Bill Stroppe's shop. The pair and their crew assembled the car. The car was debuted at the 1964 U.S. Nationals with Chrisman smoking the tires to half track. Chrisman toured the eastern half of the United States with the car through the end of the 1965 season. In 1966, he ran one of the factory backed Mercury Comets with a flip-up fiberglass body, following a trend started by Don Nicholson and Eddie Schartman. Chrisman won his first race, at the Hot Rod Magazine Championships at Riverside Race, in the Exhibition Stock category. It is generally considered to be the first funny car to exceed 180 mph (290 km/h). The car ran the quarter mile in 8.72 seconds at 184 mph (296 km/h), beating Jungle Jim Liberman in the finals. On July 10, 1966 he set a class record at 188 miles per hour (303 km/h), only to have the engine blow up two weeks later at the Super Stock Magazine Nationals. The car burned to the ground.

Chrisman came back with another Comet to race the rest of the 1966 season through 1970. Chrisman did not race in 1971. He built a "sidewinder" Mustang funny car for 1972, but never raced it. He sold it to Ray Maheu, and the car later became John Force's first ride, Nightstalker.

== Chrisman Driveline Components ==
During that time, he started Chrisman Driveline Components at his hometown Long Beach, California. The company builds car rear ends and driveline components for dragracers. It has supplied components to Kenny Bernstein, Frank Bradley, Darrell Gwynn, Eddie Hill, and Joe Pisano. He continued running the company until his death in 1989.
