= Herb McCandless =

American Pro Stock drag racer

Herb McCandless is an American Pro Stock drag racer.

With a long career in racing, McCandless won NHRA's Modified Eliminator title at the 1970 Gatornats in a Plymouth Barracuda.

McCandless also won the 1970 NHRA US Nationals in Pro Stock driving a 1970 Plymouth Duster for Sox and Martin.

From 1970 through 1974, McCandless drove a 426 cu in (6.98 L) hemi-powered Plymouth Duster for Sox and Martin

After retiring from driving, McCandless became a respected engine builder. He is the grandfather of eNASCAR driver Blake McCandless.
