= Tom Hoover (drag racer) =

American gasser drag racer (died 2022)

Tom Hoover (c. 1941 – October 21, 2022) was an American gasser drag racer.

Driving a DeSoto-powered 1957 Plymouth, he won NHRA's first ever C/Gas Altered (C/GA) national title at Detroit Dragway in 1960. His winning pass was 14.33 seconds at 100.67 mph (162.01 km/h). He won no other NHRA gasser titles. He made the move from Top Fuel to Funny Car in 1970. Hoover won AHRA World Championships in 1976 and 1977, and won the NHRA Grandnationals in 1977.

Hoover died on October 21, 2022, at the age of 81.

== Sources ==
- Davis, Larry. Gasser Wars, North Branch, MN: Cartech, 2003, pp. 180–6.
