= Connie Kalitta =

American drag racer, airline owner (born 1938)

- Born: Conrad Kalitta; February 24, 1938 (age 88); Michigan, U.S.
- Occupations: Auto Racer; Airline Owner

Previous series
- Top Fuel and Funny Car races across: NHRA, AHRA, IHRA, NASCAR

Championship titles
- IHRA Top Fuel 1979, 1982

Awards
- 1992 - Motorsports Hall of Fame of America; 2001 - NHRA Top 50 Drivers of 1951–2000; 2016 - NHRA Lifetime Achievement Award

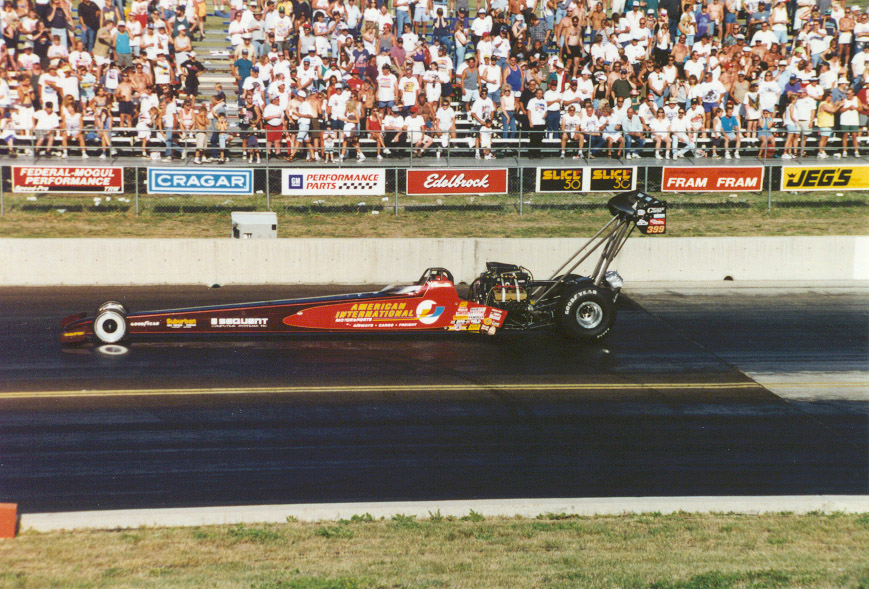
Kalitta Motorsports Top Fuel Dragster (2007)

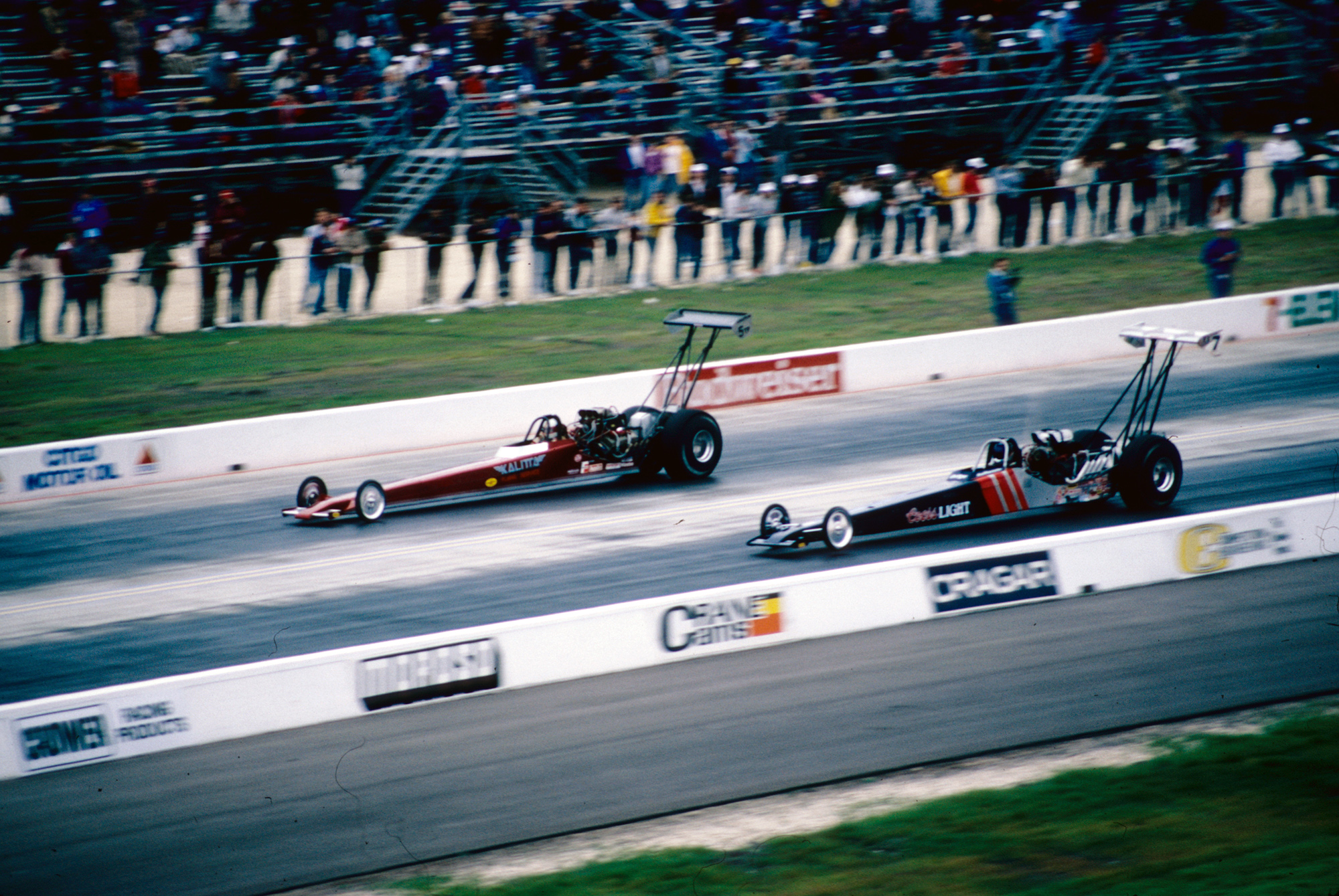
Connie Kalitta vs. Dan Pastorini (1987)

Conrad Kalitta (born February 24, 1938) is an American businessman and former drag racing driver, nicknamed "the Bounty Hunter." Kalitta is the CEO of Kalitta Air and the owner of Kalitta Motorsports.

== Biography ==
Kalitta was born in Michigan, grew up in Mount Clemens, and was a 1957 graduate of Mount Clemens High School. Kalitta raced from the 1950s through the 1990s. He was the first driver of a Top Fuel dragster to hit 200 mph (320 km/h) in a National Hot Rod Association (NHRA) sanctioned event – the 1964 NHRA U.S. Nationals. Kalitta teamed up with Shirley Muldowney as the Bounty Hunter and Bounty Huntress, in a pair of Ford Mustangs, hers a Buttera chassis, his a Logghe. Kalitta was runner-up at the 1963 NHRA Winternationals in Top Gas and at the 1965 NHRA SpringNationals in Top Fuel. His first major event win was the 1967 American Hot Rod Association (AHRA) Winternationals in Scottsdale, Arizona, in a 427ci "cammer"–powered Top Fuel dragster.

Kalitta stepped back from driving in 1971, focusing on growing his airline business. He first returned to the sport as Muldowney's crew chief – including her 1977 Top Fuel championship season – before getting back into a Top Fuel dragster in 1978. Kalitta was played by Beau Bridges, in a lead role, in the Muldowney biography film Heart Like a Wheel (1983). Kalitta won the 1989 NHRA Winternationals, most notable for the fact that the win included him becoming the first ever Top Fuel driver (any sanctioning series) to hit 290 mph (470 km/h). Kalitta ultimately won a total of 10 NHRA national events, including the 1994 Gatornationals and U.S. Nationals – his final title. Kalitta was inducted into the Motorsports Hall of Fame of America in 1992. In 2001, the 50th Anniversary list of National Hot Rod Association Top 50 Drivers, 1951–2000, ranked Kalitta at #21. On November 14, 2016, Kalitta was honored at the season-ending Mello Yello Awards Ceremony with NHRA's first ever Lifetime Achievement Award.

Kalitta is the father of racer Scott Kalitta, killed in a drag racing crash in Old Bridge Township, New Jersey, in 2008. He is the uncle of racer Doug Kalitta.
