= Roland Leong =

American drag racer (1945–2023)

Roland Leong (1945 – December 29, 2023) was an American drag racer from Honolulu, whose "Hawaiian" brand cars achieved many victories. He later went on to act as crew chief in Funny Car races.

== "Hawaiian" cars ==
=== Top Fuel Dragsters ===
Leong's "Hawaiian" Top Fuel dragsters swept the National Hot Rod Association's two National Events: the Winternationals at the Pomona Fairgrounds and the U.S. Nationals in Indianapolis, two years consecutively, in 1965 and again in 1966. This feat by Leong's entries was accomplished with two different drivers: as Don "the Snake" Prudhomme in 1965, followed by Mike Snively in 1966. In 1967, Leong failed to three-peat at Pomona or Indianapolis, but did triumph that year at two popular independent drag races, the notoriously fierce March Meet in Bakersfield, and the Hot Rod Magazine Championships in Riverside, California.

=== Funny Cars ===
In 1969, Leong abandoned campaigning Top Fuel Dragster in favor of the burgeoning Funny Car class. The following year, with driver Larry Reyes, Leong campaigned a 1970 Dodge Charger AA/Funny Car that won its class at the 1970 NHRA Winternationals. In 1971, Leong's "Hawaiian" Funny Car repeated at Pomona, winning Funny Car Eliminator again, this time with Butch Maas driving.

Throughout the 1970s and into the early 1980s, Leong campaigned a variety of "Hawaiian" Funny Cars, both in NHRA competition, as well as "match racing" at smaller, independent tracks.

In 1980, having hired Ron Colson to drive in what was Colson's final year as a professional race-car driver, Leong tuned his "King's Hawaiian Bread" Corvette Funny Car to victory at the NHRA Winston World Finals in Ontario, California. Besides being Colson's last race, the event was also notable as being the last drag race at Ontario Motor Speedway. In 1983, with Mike Dunn at the helm, Leong's "Hawaiian Punch" Funny Car won the Bakersfield March Meet. The car crashed and was destroyed later that year at the NHRA World Finals at Orange County International Raceway.

After Leong and Dunn parted ways in 1984, Leong and his new driver, Rick Johnson, won the 1985 Bakersfield March Meet, followed later that year by a victory at NHRA's Le Grandnational-Molson in Quebec, Canada.

In 1991, Leong once again won the US Nationals at Indianapolis, this time in Funny Car Eliminator, and with Jim White driving. Later, at the Chief Nationals in Dallas, Texas, his "Hawaiian Punch" Funny Car was the first in the class to break the 290-mph speed mark.

== Crew chief ==
After sitting out the 1992 season, Leong ran an abbreviated season in 1993 with driver Gordie Bonin in the Hawaiian Vacation Dodge Daytona funny car, following which Leong relinquished his role as car owner. In 1996, he began serving as a crew chief for the Red Line Oil Dodge Avenger Funny Car of Ray Higley. Despite the entry's limited finances, with Leong's input and expertise, Higley posted his career-best 1/4-mile elapsed time, posting a 5.00-second clocking at the 1996 US Nationals. In 1997, Don Prudhomme, then retired from driving and now a multi-car team owner, hired Leong to tune his "Copenhagen" Funny Car. With Ron Capps driving, Prudhomme's Leong-tuned entry won Funny Car Eliminator at that year's inaugural St. Louis race. They began the 1998 season by winning the Winternationals at Pomona, and winning the Big Bud Shootout at the U.S. Nationals. Despite winning more NHRA National Events than anybody else in the class, the Prudhomme-Leong-Capps collaboration finished second in NHRA points, behind winner John Force.

In 2009, after having taken a hiatus from the sport, Leong returned to drag racing, now acting as crew chief for "vintage" Nitro Funny Cars racing primarily in NHRA's new Hot Rod Heritage Series. In 2014, Canadian drag racer Ron Hodgson hired Leong to tune the Troy Lee Designs Nitro Funny Car driven by Tim Boychuk, for competition in the NHRA Heritage Series.

== Death ==
Leong died on December 29, 2023, at the age of 78.
