= Don Prudhomme =

NHRA champion drag race driver (born 1941)

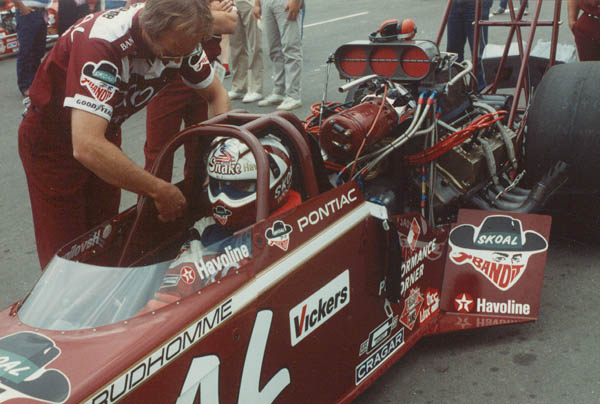
- Prudhomme in his dragster before a run in 1992
- Nationality: American/French Creole
- Born: Donald Ray Prudhomme; April 6, 1941 (age 85) San Fernando, California, U.S.
- Retired: 1994 (as racer), 2010 (as owner)

NHRA Winston Drag Racing Series
- Years active: 1960s–1994
- Championships: 4 (FC)

Championship titles
- 1975–1978: NHRA Funny Car Champion

Awards
- 1991; 2000: Motorsports Hall of Fame of America; International Motorsports Hall of Fame

Donald Ray Prudhomme (born April 6, 1941, in San Fernando, California), nicknamed "the Snake", is an American drag racer. He won the NHRA FC championship four times across a 35-year career.

Prudhomme was inducted into the Motorsports Hall of Fame of America in 1991.

== Racing career ==
=== Early career ===
Prudhomme crewed for "TV Tommy" Ivo on Ivo's twin-engined slingshot in 1960. In 1962, Prudhomme was a partner in the Greer-Black-Prudhomme fuel digger, which earned the best win record in National Hot Rod Association (NHRA) history, before switching to Funny Car.

After trouble getting the "vaunted" Gilmore Engineering-chassied Donovan Engineering Special dragster sorted out, Tom McEwen quit, and was replaced by Prudhomme, then owner-driver in the B&M Tork Master-sponsored car. In 1965, Prudhomme faced Hot Wheels teammate McEwen at the Hot Rod Magazine Championship Drag Races, held at Riverside, "one of the most significant drag racing events" of that era; ultimately, Top Fuel Eliminator (TFE) went to Jim Warren.

=== Funny Car career ===
Prudhomme's "Snake II" funny car

He was the first Funny Car driver to exceed 250 mph (400 km/h). Prudhomme raced a Shelby Super Snake in the 1968 and 1969 seasons, powered by a Ford engine instead of the ubiquitous Chrysler Hemi. When Ford discontinued the program, he went into the "Mongoose and Snake" phase of his career.

Around 1972, motorsports promoter Bob Kachler arranged a sponsorship deal with the U.S. Army for Prudhomme's Funny Car, reasoning that a popular racer could help the Army reach young recruits. Artist Kenny Youngblood redesigned the "Snake" logo in red, white, and blue for the Army cars. The arrangement ran through the most productive stretch of Prudhomme's career.

=== Snake and Mongoose rivalry ===
Prudhomme was known for his yellow 1970 Plymouth Barracuda in which he match raced Tom McEwen in his red 1970 Plymouth Duster, named Mongoose. Both drivers gained wider public attention through Mattel's Hot Wheels toy versions of the cars, released in 1970, which were among the few major corporate sponsorship packages in the sport at the time.

=== Team ownership ===
Prudhomme retired in 1994 to manage his own racing team. With driver Larry Dixon, Prudhomme's team won the Top Fuel championship in 2002 and 2003. In 2009, Dixon signed to drive the Al-Anabi Top Fuel Dragster, and Spencer Massey took over Prudhomme's car. At the end of the 2009 racing season, sponsorship went away and Prudhomme retired from active racing.

In 2019, Prudhomme sponsored and built the Montana Brand / John Force Racing Top Fuel dragster driven by Austin Prock in the NHRA Mello Yello Drag Racing Series.

== Legacy ==
=== Accolades ===
- Prudhomme was inducted in the Motorsports Hall of Fame of America in 1991.
- In 2000, Prudhomme was inducted into the International Motorsports Hall of Fame.
- On the National Hot Rod Association Top 50 Drivers 1951–2000, Prudhomme was ranked No. 3.

=== In popular culture ===
In the 1980s, David Letterman told a recurring joke about a new "Prudhomme restaurant" opening, ostensibly referencing world-famous chef Paul Prudhomme, before saying "no, Don Prudhomme!" and claiming the menu included "Funny Car Veal" and "Nitro-burning Prawns."

The 2013 film Snake and Mongoose depicts Prudhomme's rivalry with Tom "The Mongoose" McEwen and their role in bringing drag racing into the mainstream through the Mattel Hot Wheels sponsorship. Prudhomme appears in the film as a track employee helping racers find their pits. The film was inspired by Tom Madigan's book Snake vs. Mongoose: How a Rivalry Changed Drag Racing Forever.

Hal Higdon's book Six Seconds to Glory covers Prudhomme's early career through the 1973 Nationals in Indianapolis, a race in which he was battling for his first Funny Car season title. The book Don "The Snake" Prudhomme: My Life Beyond the 1320 by Prudhomme and Elana Scherr was released in 2020.

== Images ==
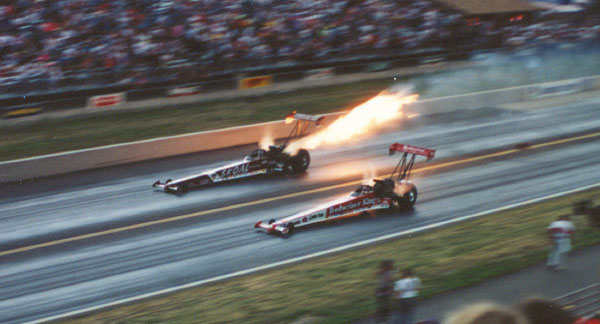
Prudhomme's car on fire in 1991 against Kenny Bernstein

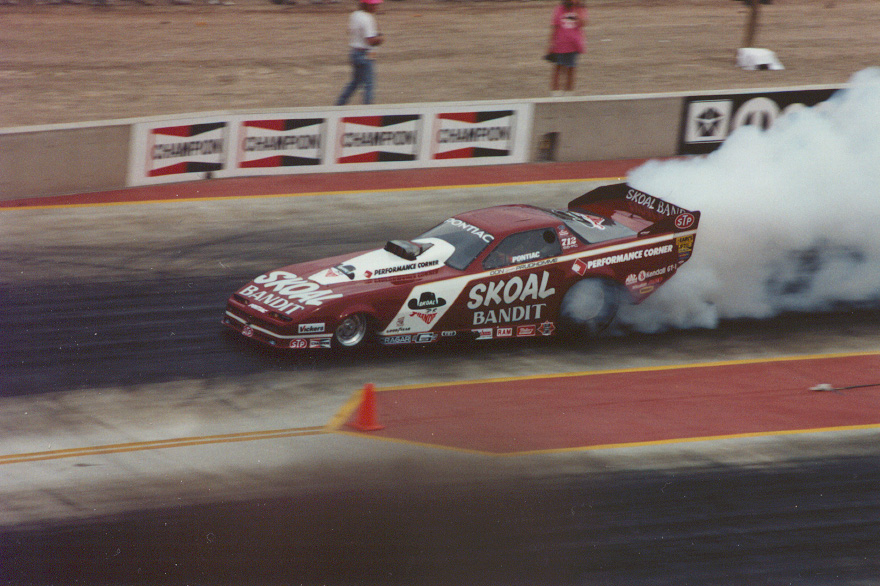
Prudhomme's Funny Car in 1989

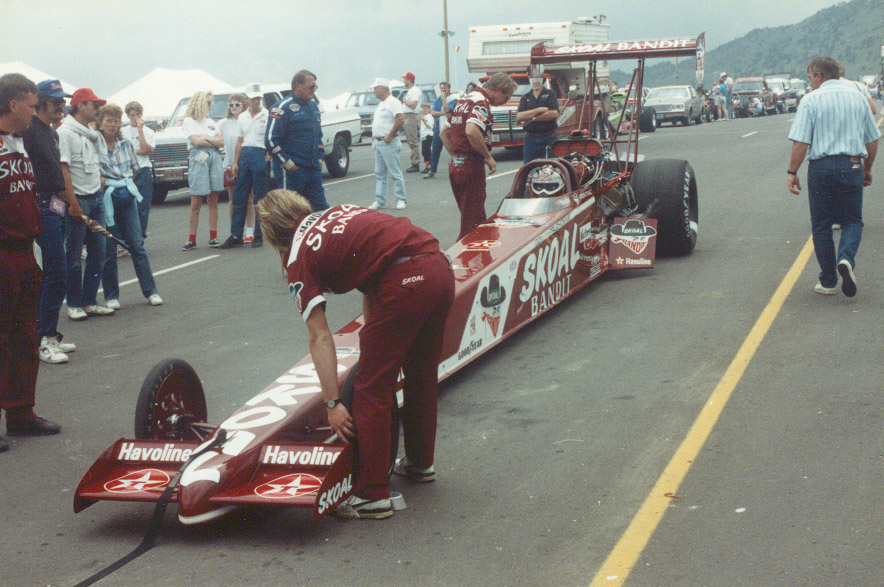
Prudhomme's Top Fuel dragster in 1992
