= Don Garlits =

NHRA champion, drag racing pioneer

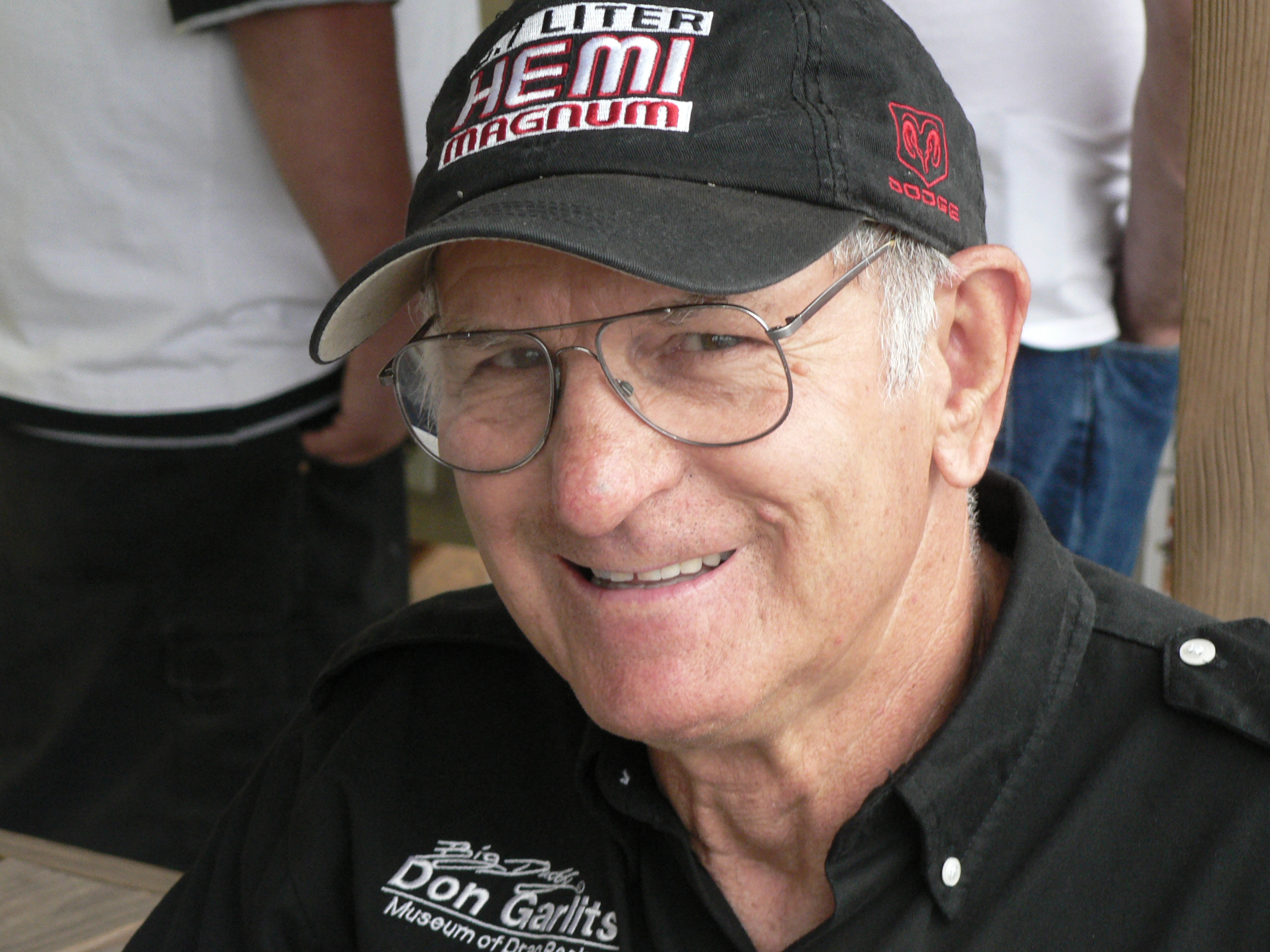
- Garlits in 2007
- Full name: Donald Glenn Garlits
- Born: January 14, 1932 (age 94) Tampa, Florida, U.S.
- Retired: 2003

Championship titles
- 1975, 1985, 1986: NHRA Top Fuel Champion

Awards
- 1989: Motorsports Hall of Fame of America

Donald Glenn Garlits (born January 14, 1932) is an American race car driver and automotive engineer. Born in Tampa, Florida, Garlits is considered the godfather of drag racing, he is known as "Big Daddy" to drag racing fans around the world. A pioneer in the field of drag racing, he perfected the rear-engine Top Fuel dragster, an innovation motivated by the loss of part of his foot in a dragster accident. This design was notably safer since it put most of the fuel processing and rotating parts of the dragster behind the driver. The driver was placed in front of nearly all the mechanical components, thus protecting him and allowing him to activate a variety of safety equipment in the event of catastrophic mechanical failure or a fire. Garlits was an early promoter of the full-body, fire-resistant Nomex driving suit, complete with socks, gloves, and balaclava.

Garlits was the first drag racer to officially surpass the 170, 180, 200, 240, 250, and 270 mile-per-hour marks in the quarter mile; he was also the first to top 200 mph (320 km/h) in the 1/8 mi (0.20 km). He has been inducted into several Halls of Fame and has won many awards during his career.

== Career ==
=== Early days ===
Garlits's first drag race car was built under an oak tree at his home in North Tampa in 1954. He used an arc welder and a cutting torch to modify an old 1927 Ford Model T Roadster. To this roadster he added a 1948 Mercury engine block, a 1939 Ford floor shift transmission, and a 1948 Ford differential and axle. That early T-Bucket's quarter mile performance was 13.5 seconds, at a top speed of 93 mph. It was this successful, formative roadster that would become the basis for his first rail-job dragster. He cut off the body panels, moved the engine back, and installed the seat behind the drive axle. (A similar design was built that same year by Mickey Thompson.) This was the legendary slingshot dragster with which Big Daddy would win the first NHRA race he entered, the NHRA Safety Safari in Lake City, Florida (12.1 seconds, 108 mph). Three years later, he became a professional drag racer. After World War II, many air force bases and landing fields were decommissioned; these abandoned runways were perfect for drag racing, and the first national drag racing meet, sponsored by the National Hot Rod Association, was held on an airfield near Great Bend, KS in 1955. Garlits, being from Florida, was something of an outsider. He was sometimes referred to as the Floridian, before permanently adopting the nickname "Swamp Rat," which also became the name for each new generation of his innovative dragster designs.

In 1959, Garlits traveled to Bakersfield, California for the US Fuel and Gas Championships, later to be named the "March Meet", to show that the times he was setting were as legitimate as those set by the west coast racers. Over 30,000 people attended the event, the largest attendance at a drag race at that point. His presence helped to grow the sport of drag racing beyond its California base. In 1964, after winning the U.S. Nationals at Indianapolis, Garlits traveled to England, with TV Tommy Ivo, Tony Nancy, Dante Duce and other racers, to participate in the first International Drag Festival, a six-event series that did much to promote the sport of drag racing in the UK.

=== Accident leads to innovation ===
On March 8, 1970, at Lions Drag Strip, Garlits was driving Swamp Rat XIII, also called the Wynnscharger, a front-engined slingshot rail dragster, when the vehicle suffered a catastrophic failure. The two-speed transmission Garlits was developing exploded and took a piece out of his right foot, while the car broke in half in front of the cockpit; he was out for the remainder of the season. In an interview by Florida Trend, Garlits said this of the incident: "In 1970, the transmission exploded in my dragster on the final run, and it cut my foot off and cut the car in two. That’s when I drew up plans for what I thought would be a championship rear-engine car. I would go out to the shop in Seffner on my wheelchair, saw stuff out on the band saw and make the parts."

Garlits's accident was like many in the 1960s, and his new design followed several other pioneer designers of rear-engined dragsters, including Steve Swaja's AA/Gas Wedge I from 1963, Roger Lindwall's 1966 Top Fuel Re-Entry, and Kent Fuller's fueller Sidewinder III from 1969. He was aided in the construction of his new car by T. C. Lemons and Connie Swingle.

=== The first modern "back-motor digger" ===
Garlits returned to Pomona in 1971 with Swamp Rat XIV, a brand new mid-engined, front-cockpit rail, also dubbed the "Swamp Rat I-R" by Hot Rod in the article introducing it to their readers. The rodding magazines considered the disadvantages of the new dragster design "obvious," and, indeed, Garlits lost in his first outing with the new car, to Gary Cochran at Lions Drag Strip.

However, Swamp Rat XIV became so successful that in 1971, Garlits won two of his next three Top Fuel Eliminator titles (the Winternats and Bakersfield), and was a runner-up at Lions, all in the new car. A change so momentous had not happened since Mickey Thompson moved the seat behind the rear axle to create the Panorama City Special slingshot rail dragster in 1954. Rear-engine dragsters have since become mainstream in drag racing.

In 1977, Ed Donovan persuaded Garlits to switch from the 426 hemi he had been using for the last thirteen years to the Donovan 417 cu in (6,830 cc), offering (in Garlits' words) "an engine deal I couldn’t refuse".

Garlits took a brief hiatus, returning to NHRA Top Fuel full-time in 1984.

=== Further accomplishments ===
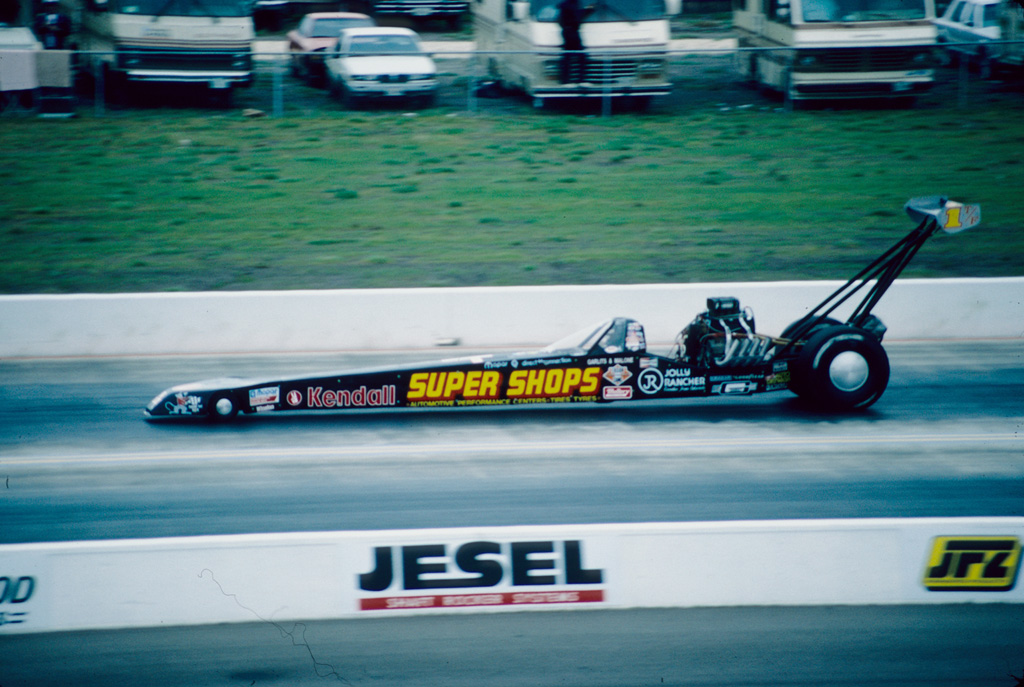
Garlits driving Swamp Rat XXX at Texas Motorplex (1987)

Garlits has won ten American Hot Rod Association championships, four International Hot Rod Association championships, and three National Hot Rod Association championships, a total of 17. He was age 54 when he won the last. He won a total of 144 national events. On October 20, 1987, his dragster Swamp Rat XXX, was enshrined in National Museum of American History, a branch of The Smithsonian museum in Washington, DC.

=== Retirement and post-racing career ===
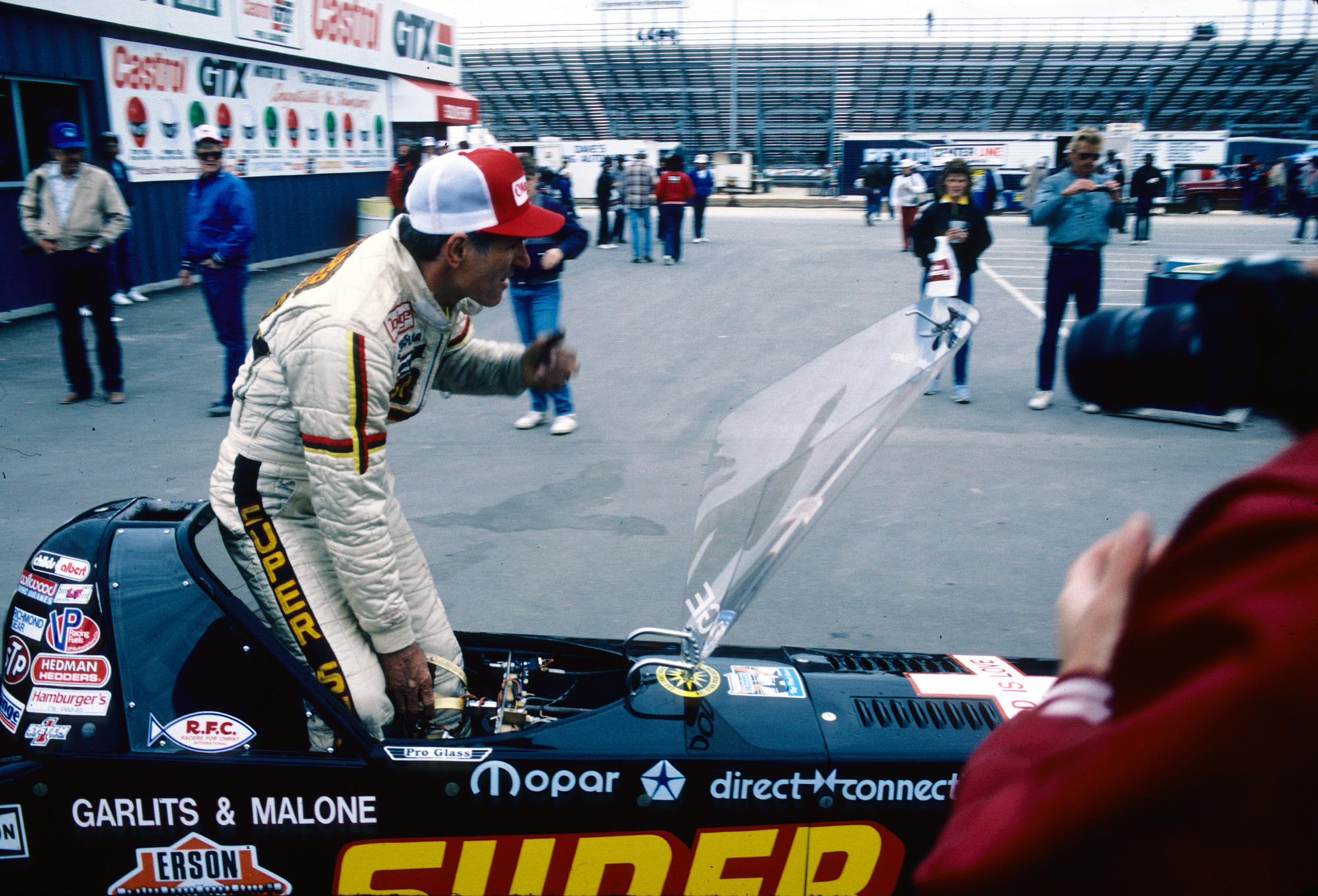
Garlits at Texas Motorplex (1987)

In 1987, Garlits suffered a blowover at the AHRA World Finals in Spokane, Washington. He received several injuries from the resulting crash. Though none were life-threatening, he temporarily retired from active driving and became a color commentator for NHRA telecasts on TNN and NBC. He announced for four seasons, from 1988 through the end of 1991. In December 1991 Garlits came out of retirement to race in the Snowbird Nationals, but his comeback was to be short-lived. "Big Daddy" retired again before the end of the 1992 season because of a detached retina, a product of the 4g deceleration produced by a Top Fuel Dragster's braking parachutes.

Garlits resumed his career briefly in 1998, and again in 2003. His last qualifying race was in May 2003 at the NHRA POWERade Drag Racing Series, 23rd annual Summit Racing Equipment NHRA Southern Nationals presented by Pontiac in Atlanta, Georgia. At the age of 71 years, 5 months and 19 days he qualified 16th, setting a personal best speed in the quarter mile with a time of 4.788 seconds at 319.98 mph. Garlits had reached 323.04 earlier in the year at the 2003 Gatornationals. Mr. Garlits lost in first-round competition with his Summit Racing-Mono Winged Dragster, clocking in with a 0.064 reaction time, a personal best 4.737 elapsed time, and 307.44 mph, second only to Brandon Bernstein's (son of racing legend Kenny Bernstein) Budweiser/Lucas Oil Dragster 0.079 reaction time, a 4.615 elapsed time, at 321.42 miles per hour. The difference at the finish line was only 122 thousandths of a second.

Garlits operates the Don Garlits Museum of Drag Racing on the grounds of his home in Ocala, Florida. He can also be seen from time to time on ESPN and Speed Vision doing commentary at racing events and performance expositions.

Always at the forefront of driver safety, in the wake of Funny Car driver Scott Kalitta's fatal crash in June 2008, and numerous other engine explosions and resultant fires, occurring in the last 300 feet of the quarter mile, Garlits declared "I am 100 percent in favor of it", regarding NHRA's decision to trim the race distance for Top Fuel and Funny Car from the traditional quarter-mile to 1,000 feet, starting with the Mopar Mile High Nationals at Bandimere Speedway three weeks later. Garlits also stated that he would support a ban on rev limiters and a return to a 70/30 nitromethane to methanol ratio, as he felt both would reduce needlessly dangerous conditions – without eliminating 300 mph drag races. The following year, Garlits suggested further revisions to address both safety and the fact that shorter distance was less entertaining due to the racers completing a pass in just 3.5 seconds; he felt that a 1,000 foot race could return to a 5.0 second pass if both horsepower, and the width of the rear tires, were reduced.

In September 2009, then-77-year-old Garlits returned to the quarter mile, racing a specially prepared 2009 Dodge Challenger in the Stock class at the 2009 NHRA U.S. Nationals at the Indianapolis Raceway Park, losing to 63-time event winner Dan Fletcher in the first round.

In May 2014, then-82-year-old Garlits set a 184 mph (296 km/h) speed record with Swamp Rat 37, a 2,000 hp battery-powered EV dragster. In July 2019 at age 87, he set a new quarter-mile record of 189.03 mph (304.21 km/h) with Swamp Rat 38, a 1,500 lb dragster with a battery-powered 800 hp electric motor.

Garlits is a mentor of current NHRA Top Fuel racer and fellow Ocala, Florida resident, Josh Hart.

=== Political affiliation ===
In 1994, Garlits was the Republican Party nominee for Florida's 5th Congressional District. He was defeated by incumbent Democrat Karen Thurman. He supported the Republican candidacy of Ron Paul for President in 2008.

== Awards ==
- In 2014, he was inducted into the British Drag Racing Hall of Fame as its Overseas Member induction for that year.
- In 2004 he was inducted into the Automotive Hall of Fame.
- In 1997, he was inducted into the International Motorsports Hall of Fame.
- He was inducted in the Motorsports Hall of Fame of America in 1989 as the sole representative of drag racing.
- On the National Hot Rod Association Top 50 Drivers, 1951–2000, Don Garlits was ranked No.1.
- In 1987, Garlits' record-setting Swamp Rat XXX was inducted into and enshrined at The Smithsonian Institution in Washington, D.C.
- In 2008, he was inducted into the inaugural hall of fame class at Gateway International Raceway.
- In 2008, ESPN ranked him 23rd on their top drivers of all-time.
