= George Montgomery (drag racer) =

American drag racer (1933–2023)

George Montgomery (January 27, 1933 – August 24, 2023), nicknamed Ohio George, was an American gasser drag racer.

== Career ==
Montgomery began drag racing as a teen, learning mechanical skills at the AC Delco plant in Dayton, Ohio, he would later use to build the supercharger on his 390 cu in (6 L) Cadillac; he would mate a Cragar 4-71 manifold to a GMC 6-71 blower, and hand-fabricated the drive pulleys.

In 1950, Montgomery opened George's Speed Shop, which would ultimately earn the distinction of being the oldest continuously-operated speed shop in the U.S.

Montgomery got the nickname "Ohio George" from Tim Woods, owner of the Stone-Woods-Cook Willys gasser, at the 1963 Nationals in Indianapolis.

Montgomery won an NHRA national title in a gas class seven times, once in A/G, four in A/GS, and twice in AA/G (supercharged). He was also thrice Gas Eliminator champion, meaning he had the quickest gasser at the meet.

At Detroit Dragway in 1959, his first appearance at a national event, Montgomery drove his Cadillac-powered 1933 Willys to an A/G win, with a pass of 11.94 seconds at 124.65 mph (200.60 km/h); he also took Little Eliminator. He repeated at Detroit in A/GS in 1960, with a pass of 12.36 seconds at 107.65 mph (173.25 km/h); he again took Little Eliminator.

In 1961, at Indianapolis Raceway Park, Montgomery took the A/GS title with a pass of 10.91 seconds at 130.63 mph (210.23 km/h).

Changing classes to AA/G, Montgomery won again at Indianapolis in 1963, now with Chevrolet power (and a magnesium-cased supercharger) Facing the well-known Stone-Woods-Cook gasser (driven by Doug Cook) in "the race of the meet", Montgomery recorded a pass of 10.45 seconds at 129.00 mph (207.61 km/h), and also took Middle Eliminator. By taking the Eliminator, Montgomery became the first driver in NHRA to win it three times.

Montgomery repeated the class win there in 1964, with a pass of 10.20 seconds at 138.88 mph (223.51 km/h).

Changing classes, and to supercharged 427 SOHC power in AA/G, for 1966, Montgomery again won the national title at Indianapolis, turning in a pass of 9.58 seconds at 153.58 mph (247.16 km/h). He repeated the win there in 1967, clocking 8.92 seconds at 134.32 mph (216.17 km/h).

Montgomery also drove the AA/G Ford Prefect he named The Gasser Passer.

In 1967, Montgomery was offered a new fiberglass-bodied Ford Mustang (to go with the 427), and promptly retired the ill-handling Willys. The Mustang gave him Super Eliminator wins with passes in the mid eights at speeds over 160 mph (260 km/h).

Montgomery took the AA/GS title at Indy in 1968, also setting new gasser records for low e.t. and top speed (8.56/171 mph (275 km/h), as well as the award for "Best Engineered".

In 1969, Montgomery introduced a fiberglass copy of the new Mustang, at first with the 427 SOHC, later with a 450 cu in (7 L) version of the Boss 429. While Montgomery was unimpressed with the Shotgun engine, it nevertheless powered the Mustang to a Super Eliminator win at that year's Nationals, beating the AA/A roadster of Ron Ellis.

The Mr Gasket - and Chapman Race Products-sponsored Mustang, now with twin Schwitzer turbochargers, would give Montgomery a class win again at the Nationals in 1971, with an 8.50 second pass.

During the "gasser wars", Montgomery was a continuing favorite among touring match racers, often facing "Big John" Mazmanian and match racer K. S. Pittman, among others.

Montgomery would close his regular racing career in 1975, as the popularity of gassers faded, switching to driving a turbocharged Ford Pinto, but only occasionally, until 1986.

In 2000, Montgomery and his son, Gregg, were refurbishing Buick V6 engines used in Indy Lights racing.

Montgomery was also inducted to the International Drag Racing Hall of Fame.

Montgomery was inducted into the Motorsports Hall of Fame of America on March 17, 2020.

Montgomery died on August 24, 2023, at 90.

== Sources ==
- Davis, Larry. Gasser Wars, North Branch, MN: Cartech, 2003, pp. 180–8.
- Hardin, Drew. "Remembering Gasser Legend 'Ohio George' Mongomery". Hot Rod Magazine, January 2024, pp. 8-9.
