= Trouble Maker (car) =

Overview
- Designer: Bill Devin and Joe Lunati

Body and chassis
- Class: Gasser

Trouble Maker is an American gasser drag racer, driven to three National Hot Rod Association (NHRA) national AM/SP gasser titles by Joe Lunati.

== History ==
A Devin powered by a Chevrolet engine, the car was driven to three NHRA national AM/SP gasser titles by Joe Lunati.

The first win was at the 1964 Nationals, held at Indianapolis Raceway Park, with a pass of 10.62 seconds at 132.93 mph (213.93 km/h). Trouble Maker also took Street Eliminator at the event.

In 1965, Trouble Maker again took the AM/SP national title, with a win at the Nationals, held at Indianapolis. The winning pass was 10.33 seconds at 138.24 mph (222.48 km/h).

Trouble Maker claimed a third AM/SP title at Indy in 1966, with a pass of 10.31 seconds at 139.96 mph (225.24 km/h). The car was also Street Eliminator winner there that year.

== Sources ==
- Davis, Larry (2003). Gasser wars : drag racing's street classes, 1955-1968. CarTech. ISBN 1-884089-77-1. OCLC 51984833.
