= Gasser (car) =

Type of drag race car

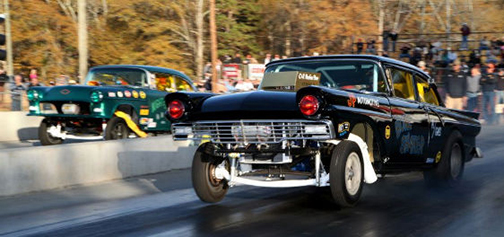
- Two gassers racing

Overview
- Model years: 1950s to early 1970s

Body and chassis
- Class: Hot rod

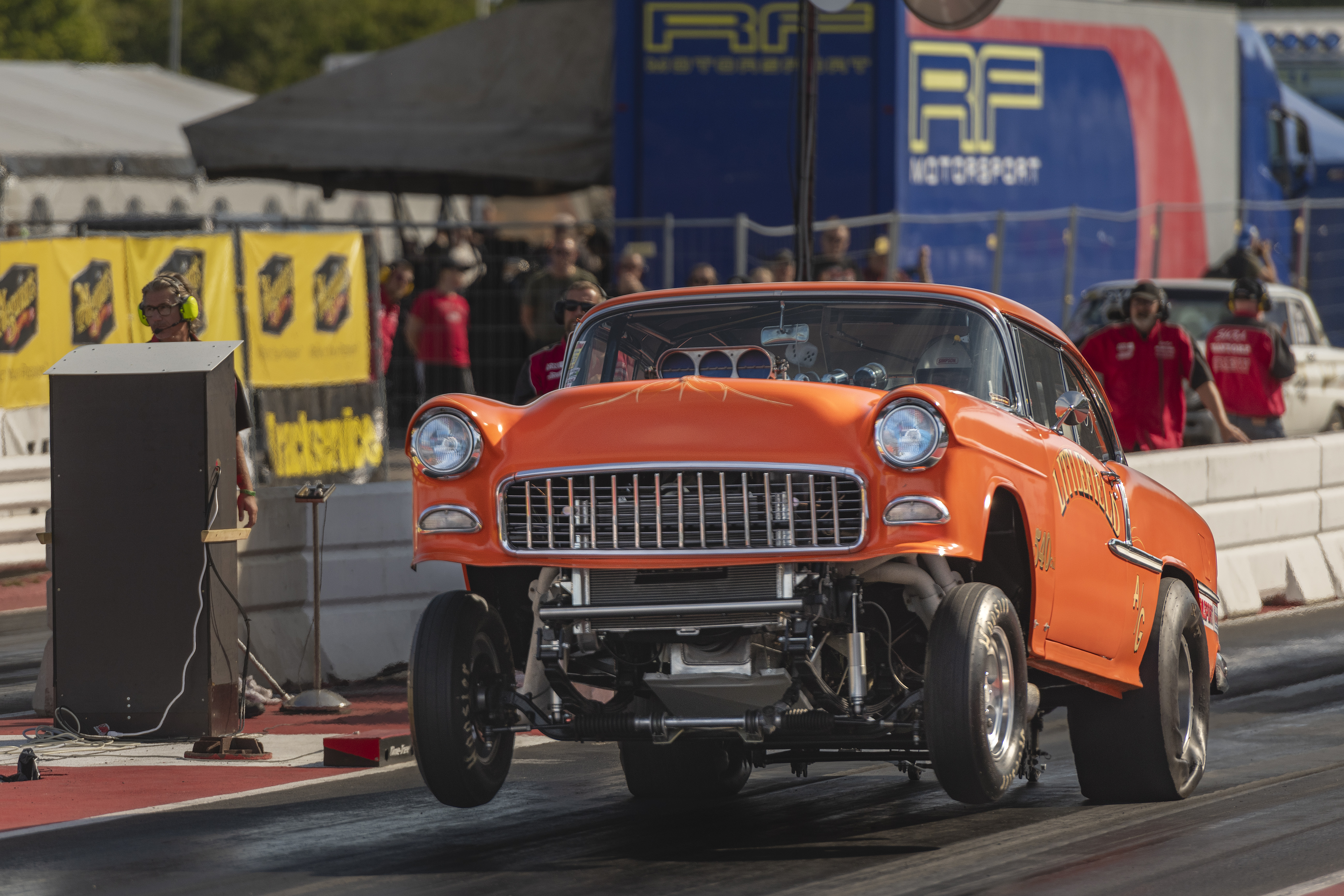
Chevrolet A/Gas racer at Mantorp Park, Sweden 2023.

A gasser is a type of hot rod originally used for drag racing. This type of car originated in United States in the late 1950s and continued until the early 1970s. In the days before Pro Stock, the A/Gas cars were the fastest stock-appearing racers around.

== History ==
Gassers are based on closed-body production models (Note: A closed body means a solid top (not a convertible). Production means that the model was produced by a major manufacturer in significant numbers.) from the 1930s to mid-1960s, which have been stripped of extraneous weight and jacked up using a beam axle or tubular axle to provide better weight distribution on acceleration (beam axles are also lighter than an independent front suspension), though a raised stock front suspension is common as well. Common weight reduction techniques include fiberglass body panels, stripped interiors, and Lexan windows (sometimes color tinted).

The 1933–36 Willys coupés and pickups were very popular gassers, in particular the 1933 Willys 77. While neither cheap nor plentiful, it was a competitive and lightweight choice satisfying the rules of the era (which required a ladder frame). At least one gasser incorporated a Willys frame under a Ford body to placate their sponsor while keeping it race legal. Keith Ferrell's Dogcatcher, for instance, was a 1936 delivery with a fuel injected small-block Chevrolet, built for the class; in 1967, Ferrell deliberately left something off to run it in B/Altered (later, with a supercharger, in BB/A).

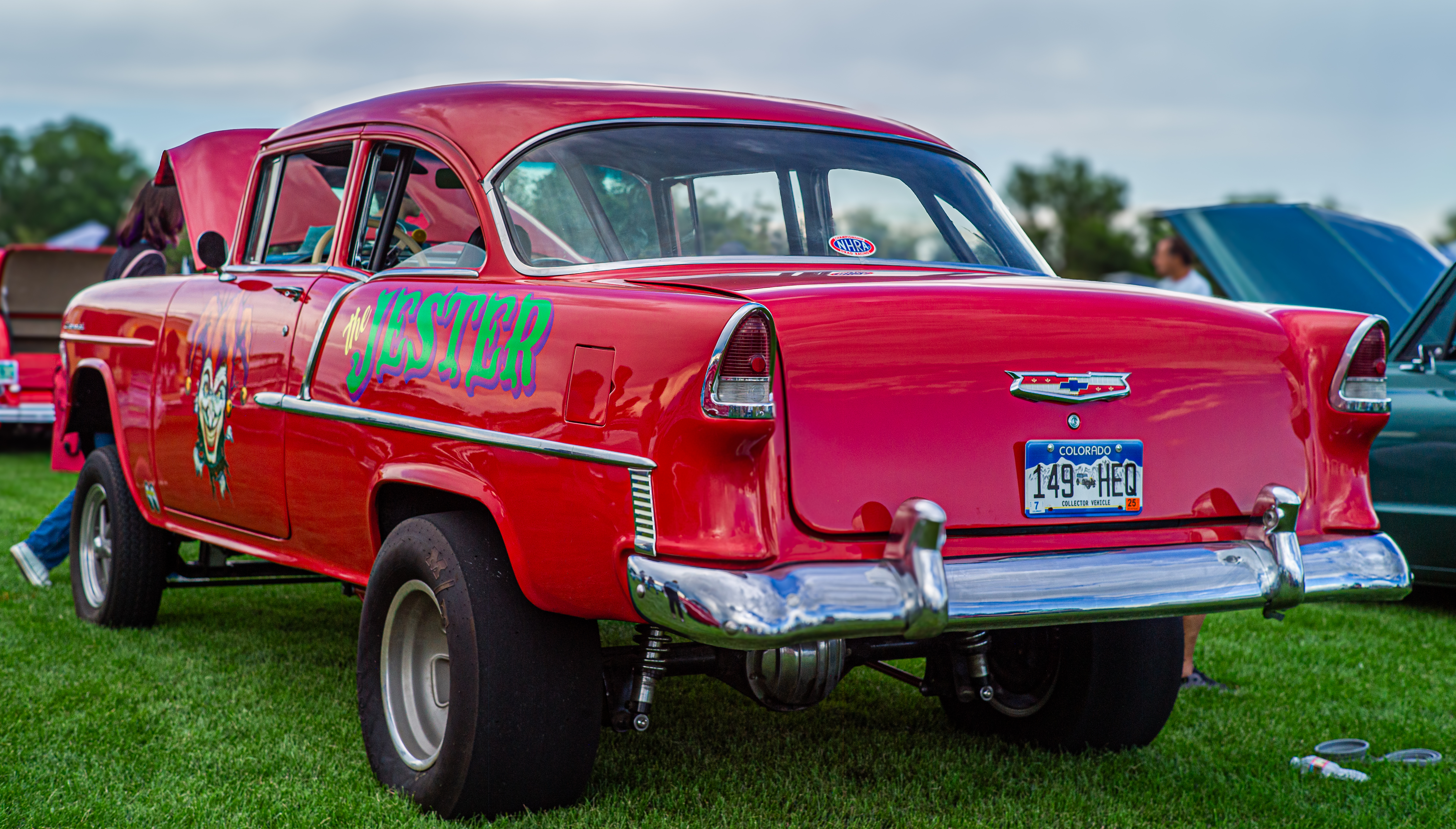
1955 Chevrolet Gasser, Rear View

After the company revived, the 1937-42 coupés, sedans, and pickups were again popular with hot rodders and gasser teams, and again, comparatively low production leaves unexplained why they gained so much attention. Ollie Olsen's 1940 coupé Wil-A-Meaner (driven by Bob "Rapid" Dwyer) won the 1961 Nationals' A/G title. Between 1962 and 1964, the Hassel & Vogelsong 1940 coupé "was the scourge of B/Gas", winning the 1963 and 1964 Nationals and setting a 1964 national record at 11.34. In 1967, the Hrudka Brothers' 1933 panel delivery was a popular wheelstander.

Postwar Willyses were also used (such as the Bremerton, Washington-based Speed Sport Specialties 1954 Willys in B/Gas), but, despite being a better chassis than the 1955-7 Chevrolet, were never as popular as the prewar cars.

Combinations could be unusual. Fujimo, Too! was a B/G 1950 Plymouth business coupé (run by Adler and Trout) with an injected Oldsmobile and Hydro-Motive transmission.

NHRA first licensed women drivers in gas classes in 1963, when Roberta Leighton, member of the Dust Devils Car Club and driver of an injected El Camino, was first admitted.

Throughout the 1960s, the Stickle and Riffle Anglia, based out of the Rod Shop and driven by Bob Riffle, were frequent winners. Their only national titles, however, were B/G at the 1967 Nationals and C/G at the 1968 Nationals. Riffle's best pass in B/Gas was 10.54 seconds at 128.20 mph (206.32 km/h).

At the 1965 Nationals, held at Indianapolis Raceway Park in Indianapolis, Indiana, 1941 Willyses driven by Dick Bourgeous (owned by "Big John" Mazmanian, sponsored by Engle Cams) and Doug "Cookie" Cook (the Stone-Woods-Cook gasser, sponsored by Isky Cams) faced off in A/GS. (Cook took the win with a pass of 14.20 seconds at 116.53 mph (187.54 km/h).)

Stone-Woods-Cook abandoned A/GS for Top Fuel Funny Car by the start of the 1967 season.

Late model cars were first allowed in the Gas classes in 1967.

Mazmanian would quit the gas classes for fuel funny car in 1968.

Gas classes were eliminated by NHRA in 1972. However, the NHRA still categorises gassers in sportsman categories, and vehicles can run gasoline or alcohol fuel (the latter safer in case of fire). The term "Super Gas" in NHRA refers to the rules that prohibit dragsters and mandate full-bodied cars in that category today.

== Engine ==
Because they were primarily built for racing, these cars typically had the engine swapped to a larger or more powerful one, or the existing stock engine modified (often heavily). It was very common to fit a Roots supercharger modified from original use on General Motors two-cycle diesel truck engines and mechanical fuel injection, manufactured by Algon, Hilborn, or Crower.

== Suspension ==
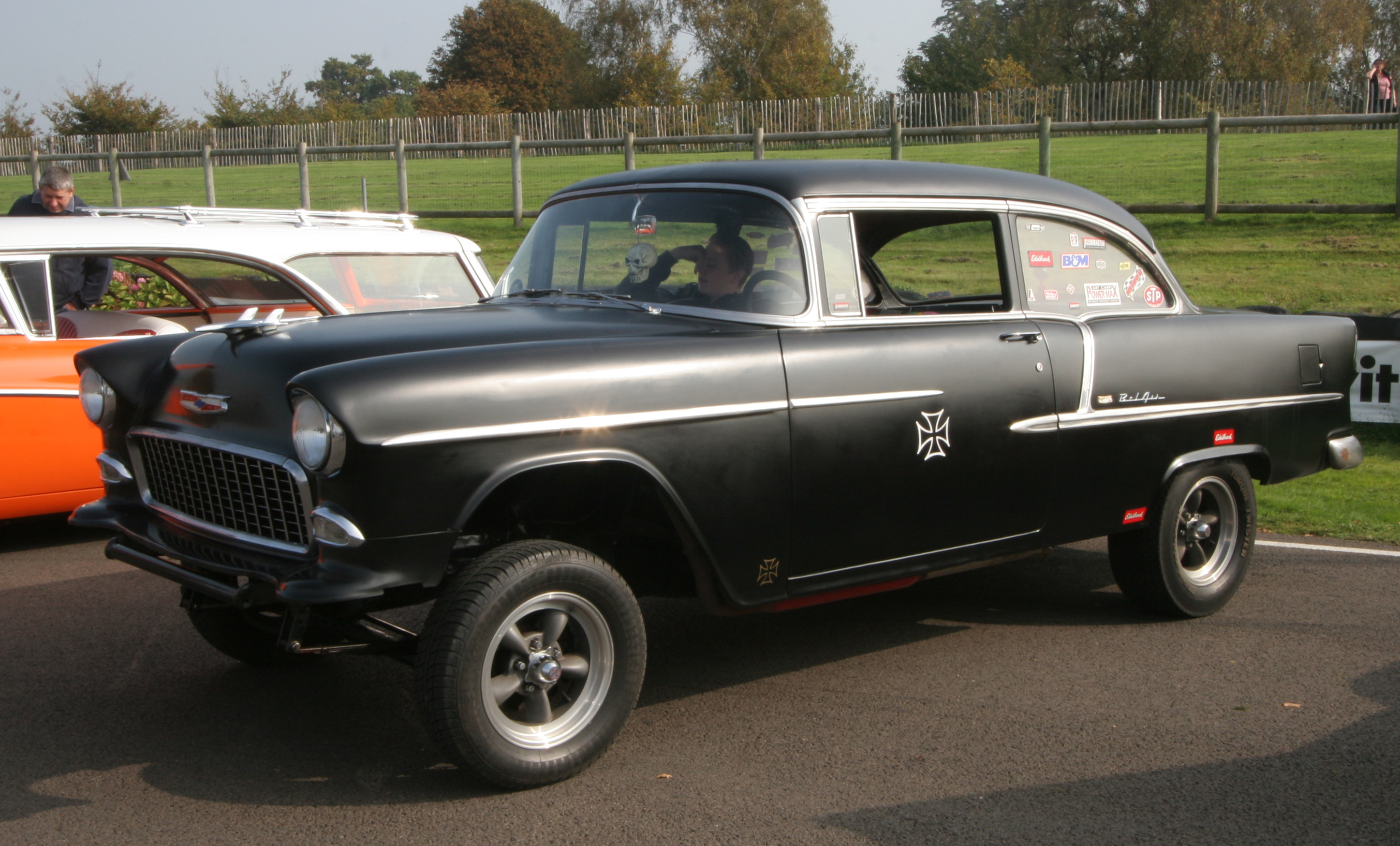
1955 Chevrolet Bel Air gasser

With form being dictated by function, their appearance is often very top heavy and ungainly, mainly due to front ends being raised higher than stock, to assist in the weight transfer during rapid acceleration (racing). Having their exhaust pipes exit through the front fender well is a common characteristic of gassers, as is having bodies painted in flamboyant metalflakes, pearls, and candy finishes complemented by lettering in wild fonts. Most gassers also had ladder bars.

== Name ==
The name arose because they competed in a gasoline-fueled drag racing class, rather than one using methanol or nitromethane.

== Named cars ==
There were a number of cars run under names.

Name	Entrant	Year and make	Class
Agitator	Paul Day	1933 Willys	BB/GS
Assassination	Guzman & Ward	1934 MG	AAM/SP
The Bare	Dick Shroyer	1939 Chevrolet	H/G
The Bird Hunter	Ted Walters	1940 Willys	C/G
Bonesmobile Special	Curt Carroll	1931 Ford	A/G
Born Runnin'	Willie Johnson	1927 Ford truck	A/SR
Boss Hydro	Joe Pirrone	1933 Willys	AA/G
Cat Skinner	Bogan & Renfroe	1941 Willys	A/G
Chicken Coupe	Ray Moore	1940 Willys	B/GS
City of Industry	Sam Parriott	1953 & 1963 Kurtis	A/SP, AM/SP, AAM/SP
Confusion	Courtney Lee Scott	1934 Ford	B/GS
Dark Horse	Stone-Woods-Finders (driven by Chuck Finders)	1933 Willys	B/GS
Dark Horse Too	Stone-Woods-Cook (driven by Doug Cook)	1966 Mustang	AA/GS
Dirty Thirty	Charlie Hill	1933 Willys	A/GS
Dogcatcher	Keith Ferrell	1933 Willys delivery	B/A, BB/A
Filthy Forty	Hill & Zartman	1940 Willys	C/G
Fire Brewed	Chuck Finders	1949 Anglia	AA/GS
Flintstone Flyer	Dave Koffel	1949 Packard	E/G
Flintstone Flyer Too	Dave Koffel	1959 Studebaker	F/G
Frivilous I	Bob & Jim Joffer	1963 Ford	B/MP
Fujimo, Too!	Adler & Trout	1950 Plymouth	B/G
The Gasser Passer	"Ohio George" Montgomery	Ford Prefect	AA/G
Giddy Up Go	Joe Lowery	1956 Chevrolet	D/G
Here Comes Snoopy	Bucky Burk	1949 Anglia	B/G
The High and Mighty	Jim Parsons	1927 Ford	A/SR
Holeshot 6	Tom Langdon	1949 Anglia	G/G
The Hammer	Dick Becker	1950 Anglia	G/G
Hydro Phobia		1931 Ford	B/G
Inch Pincher	Dean Lowry	1956 Volkswagen Beetle	H/G
Irritation	Dan Stanton	1940 Willys	C/A
Jolly Dolly	Bob Bernarden	1939 Chevrolet	C/G
Kamikaze Koup	Coonrod & Harry	1933 Willys	A/GS
The Kentuckian	Glen Wothington	1966 Corvette	BM/SP
King Kong	Kohler Brothers	1951 Anglia	A/GS
The Klein Bird	Bill Ireland	1965 Mustang	A/MP
The Numismatist	Allyn Lynch	1941 Willy's	B/GS
The Numismatist II	Allyn Lynch	1965 Mustang	C/GS
Wahoppon	Ed Mezzio	1955 Chevrolet	B/GS
Wil-A-Meaner	Ollie Olsen (driven by Bob "Rapid" Dwyer)	1940 Willys coupé	A/G

== NHRA National Champions ==
=== 1955, Great Bend, Kansas ===
Class	Entrant	Engine	Car (year and make)	Elapsed time (seconds)	Trap speed
A/G	Dick Cadwalader	Oldsmobile	1933 Ford	(not recorded)	96.87 mph (155.90 km/h)
B/G	Waterworth/Morris	Mercury	1932 Ford	(not recorded)	92.15 mph (148.30 km/h)
C/G	Howard Johansen		1955 Chevrolet	(not recorded)	94.53 mph (152.13 km/h)
D/G	M. S. Shephard		1955 Chevrolet	(not recorded)	88.40 mph (142.27 km/h)
A/SR	Owen Bowling	Chrysler	1929 Ford	(not recorded)	88.75 mph (142.83 km/h)
B/SR	Red Lund	Ford	1932 Ford	(not recorded)	96.15 mph (154.74 km/h)
C/SR	Dale Ham	Dodge	1929 Ford	(not recorded)	91.64 mph (147.48 km/h)
A/SP	Warren Turner	Chrysler	Allard	(not recorded)	104.89 mph (168.80 km/h)
B/SP	Ralph Richter		1955 Porsche	(not recorded)	84.19 mph (135.49 km/h)

=== 1956, Kansas City, Missouri ===
Class	Entrant	Engine	Car (year and make)	Elapsed time (seconds)	Trap speed
A/G	Wilton Zaiser	Oldsmobile	1931 Ford	13.32	108.82 mph (175.13 km/h)
B/G	H. L. Davis	Chrysler	1940 Ford	14.36	103.32 mph (166.28 km/h)
C/G	Earl Dorris	Chevrolet	1934 Chevrolet	15.20	94.63 mph (152.29 km/h)
D/G	Leland Allega	Chevrolet	1956 Chevrolet	15.35	87.29 mph (140.48 km/h)
A/SR	Safford & Shores	Chevrolet	1929 Ford	13.94	102.04 mph (164.22 km/h)
B/SR	John Mulkey	Ford	1932 Ford	14.43	99.22 mph (159.68 km/h)
A/SP	Jack Jenkins		1956 Corvette	14.52	98.36 mph (158.30 km/h)
B/SP	Ralph Richter		1956 MGA	20.13	69.44 mph (111.75 km/h)

=== 1957, Oklahoma City, Oklahoma ===
Class	Entrant	Engine	Car (year and make)	Elapsed time (seconds)	Trap speed
A/G	Harry Lawhon	Oldsmobile	1933 Ford	13.14	96.25 mph (154.90 km/h)
B/G	C. E. Foltin	Oldsmobile	1938 Chevrolet	14.07	85.95 mph (138.32 km/h)
C/G	Richard C. Jasper	Chevrolet	1934 Ford	14.28	96.56 mph (155.40 km/h)
D/G	Alan Templin	Chevrolet	1951 Ford	14.77	92.78 mph (149.31 km/h)
A/SR	Curtis Franke	Chevrolet	1924 Model T	13.22	105.88 mph (170.40 km/h)
B/SR	Carl Stone	Chevrolet	1932 Ford	13.97	98.03 mph (157.76 km/h)
A/SP	Don Simmons	Buick	1954 Austin-Healey	(not recorded)	109.63 mph (176.43 km/h)
C/SP	Ernest Grimm		1957 Corvette	(not recorded)	99.00 mph (159.33 km/h)

=== 1958, Oklahoma City, Oklahoma ===
Class	Entrant	Engine	Car (year and make)	Elapsed time (seconds)	Trap speed
A/G	Carroll Howard	Oldsmobile	1931 Ford	13.53	103.56 mph (166.66 km/h)
B/G	Robert "Junior" Johnson	Chevrolet	1941 Studebaker	13.13	104.04 mph (167.44 km/h)
C/G	Richard C. Jasper	Chevrolet	1934 Ford	13.76	99.22 mph (159.68 km/h)
D/G	Ron Helfenstein	Chevrolet	1940 Ford	13.67	99.44 mph (160.03 km/h)
E/G	Jim Spencer	Chevrolet	1951 Chevrolet	15.07	90.54 mph (145.71 km/h)
A/SR	Carl Johnson	Cadillac	1930 Ford	13.52	100.00 mph (160.93 km/h)
B/SR	John Mulkey	Chevrolet	1932 Ford	13.36	104.65 mph (168.42 km/h)
A/SP	Sam Parriott	Cadillac	1953 Kurtis (City of Industry)	12.17	122.44 mph (197.05 km/h)
B/SP	Don Simmons	Buick	1954 Austin-Healey	12.80	116.27 mph (187.12 km/h)
C/SP}	Wilson & Croy	Ford	Spee	19.92	69.98 mph (112.62 km/h)
Little Eliminator	Robert "Junior" Johnson	B/G 1941 Studebaker			

=== 1959, Detroit Dragway ===
Class	Entrant	Engine	Car (year and make)	Elapsed time (seconds)	Trap speed
A/G	"Ohio George" Montgomery	Cadillac	1933 Willys	11.94	124.65 mph (200.60 km/h)
B/G	Jim Whitaker	Chevrolet	1932 Ford	14.19	92.23 mph (148.43 km/h)
C/G	Doug Cook	Chevrolet	1937 Chevrolet	13.17	105.88 mph (170.40 km/h)
D/G	Ed Coughlin	Chevrolet	1955 Chevrolet	14.06	97.71 mph (157.25 km/h)
E/G	Johnny Loper		1959 Chevrolet	14.94	93.45 mph (150.39 km/h)
A/SR	G. A. Jones	Olds	1952 MG	11.61	125.87 mph (202.57 km/h)
B/SR	Peter Mattei	Chevrolet	1934 Ford	13.05	107.91 mph (173.66 km/h)
AA/SP	Bill Jones	Lincoln	1957 Thunderbird	16.19	91.74 mph (147.64 km/h)
A/SP	Jack Horsley	Lincoln	1959 Devin	15.16	93.26 mph (150.09 km/h)
B/SP	Andrew Zanca	Chevrolet	1954 Corvette	12.96	110.02 mph (177.06 km/h)
C/SP	Gil Dunn		1955 Porsche	16.99	81.00 mph (130.36 km/h)
Sports Eliminator	Jack Horsley	A/SP 1959 Devin			
Little Eliminator	"Ohio George" Montgomery	A/G 1933 Willys			

=== 1960, Detroit Dragway ===
Class	Entrant	Engine	Car (year and make)	Elapsed time (seconds)	Trap speed
A/GS	"Ohio George" Montgomery	Cadillac	1933 Willys	12.36	107.65 mph (173.25 km/h)
B/GS	Wilton Zaiser	Oldsmobile	1941 Willys	11.84	121.29 mph (195.20 km/h)
C/GS	Doug Cook	Chevrolet	1941 Willys	12.89	119.36 mph (192.09 km/h)
A/G	Billy Pate	Chrysler	1932 Ford	12.36	113.06 mph (181.95 km/h)
B/G	Leonard Grennon	Chevrolet	1935 Plymouth	13.40	105.38 mph (169.59 km/h)
C/G	Jim Koonce	Chevrolet	1955 Chevrolet	14.31	102.04 mph (164.22 km/h)
D/G	John Endes	Chevrolet	1958 Chevrolet	14.03	100.11 mph (161.11 km/h)
E/G	Wilbur Tackett	Chevrolet	1955 Chevrolet	15.78	94.14 mph (151.50 km/h)
F/G	Thom Prosser	Ford	1946 Ford	15.99	85.14 mph (137.02 km/h)
A/GA	Al Zerbarini	Oldsmobile	1940 Willys	12.61	106.88 mph (172.01 km/h)
B/GA	Johnny Loper	Oldsmobile	1941 Willys	13.72	108.82 mph (175.13 km/h)
C/GA	Tom Hoover	DeSoto	1957 Plymouth	14.33	100.67 mph (162.01 km/h)
A/SR	Don Cathcart	Oldsmobile	1926 Ford	13.52	106.83 mph (171.93 km/h)
B/SR	Courtney Lee Scott	DeSoto	1934 Ford	13.32	107.27 mph (172.63 km/h)
C/SR	Jim Lightcap	GMC	Model A	15.03	77.5 mph (124.7 km/h)
AM/SP	Sam Parriott	Cadillac	1953 Kurtis City of Industry	12.29	130.62 mph (210.21 km/h)
BM/SP	Dick Valentine	Chevrolet	1957 Corvette	13.01	103.80 mph (167.05 km/h)
Street Eliminator	Courtney Lee Scott	B/SR 1934 Ford			
Little Eliminator	"Ohio George" Montgomery	A/GS 1933 Willys			

=== 1961, Indianapolis Raceway Park ===
Class	Entrant	Engine	Car (year and make)	Elapsed time (seconds)	Trap speed
A/GS	"Ohio George" Montgomery	Cadillac	1933 Willys	10.91	130.63 mph (210.23 km/h)
B/GS	Ray Moore	Chevrolet	1940 Willys Chicken Coupe	11.76	120.32 mph (193.64 km/h)
C/GS	K. S. Pittman	Oldsmobile	1941 Willys	12.03	118.89 mph (191.33 km/h)
A/G	Ollie Olsen	Chevrolet	1940 Willys	11.68	116.27 mph (187.12 km/h)
B/G	Junior Garrison	Chevrolet	1940 Willys	12.42	112.60 mph (181.21 km/h)
C/G	Larry Teter	Chevrolet	1932 Ford	13.34	112.00 mph (180.25 km/h)
D/G	Joe Hrudka	Chevrolet	1957 Chevrolet	12.73	105.26 mph (169.40 km/h)
E/G	Jim Koonce	Chevrolet	1955 Chevrolet	14.07	96.20 mph (154.82 km/h)
F/G	Don Neal	Ford	1932 Ford	13.67	99.33 mph (159.86 km/h)
G/G	Pete McNicholl	Chrysler slant 6	1940 Willys	14.11	96.98 mph (156.07 km/h)
AM/SP	Sam Parriott	Cadillac	1953 Kurtis City of Industry	11.91	128.20 mph (206.32 km/h)
BM/SP	Jerry Osborn	Chevrolet	Austin-Healey	12.09	117.49 mph (189.08 km/h)
CM/SP	Busham/Casazza	Chevrolet	special	13.16	107.14 mph (172.43 km/h)
A/SR	Milton Potter	Oldsmobile	Model A	11.49	132.55 mph (213.32 km/h)
B/SR	Armstrong/Thomas	Chevrolet	1932 Ford	12.38	114.79 mph (184.74 km/h)
C/SR	Jim Lightcap	GMC	Ford Model A	13.63	102.04 mph (164.22 km/h)
Street Eliminator	Junior Garrison	B/G 1940 Willys			

=== 1962, NHRA Nationals, Indianapolis Raceway Park ===
Class	Entrant	Engine	Car (year and make)	Elapsed time (seconds)	Trap speed
A/GS	Doug Cook (Stone-Woods-Cook)	Oldsmobile	1941 Willys	10.59	136.77 mph (220.11 km/h)
B/GS	Bill Reeves	Chevrolet	Willys	11.24	125.34 mph (201.72 km/h)
C/GS	Sam Jones (Moody & Jones)	Chevrolet	1937 Chevrolet	12.43	113.20 mph (182.18 km/h)
A/G	Norm Hall	Chevrolet	Willys	12.06	120.16 mph (193.38 km/h)
B/G	Johnny Loper	Chevrolet	Willys	12.04	111.11 mph (178.81 km/h)
C/G	Larry Teter	Chevrolet	1932 Ford	13.37	108.30 mph (174.29 km/h)
D/G	Joe Hrudka (Peters & Betz)	Chevrolet	1955 Chevrolet	13.37	105.63 mph (170.00 km/h)
E/G	Dave Koffel	Chevrolet	1949 Packard Flintstone Flyer	13.71	102.85 mph (165.52 km/h)
F/G	Jerry Haley	GMC	1933 Plymouth	14.76	95.23 mph (153.26 km/h)
A/SR	Hugh Tucker	Oldsmobile	1928 Chevrolet	11.14	130.24 mph (209.60 km/h)
B/SR	Scott Reider	Chevrolet	1932 Ford	12.65	112.78 mph (181.50 km/h)
AM/SP	Sam Parriott	Cadillac	1953 Kurtis City of Industry	12.53	111.80 mph (179.92 km/h)
BM/SP	Bones Balogh (J&J Muffler)	Chevrolet	1958 Corvette	11.62	124.82 mph (200.88 km/h)
CM/SP	James Cornell	Chevrolet	Corvette	12.75	104.89 mph (168.80 km/h)
DM/SP	Jim Friar		Triumph	17.10	79.29 mph (127.60 km/h)
Street Eliminator	Sam Jones	C/GS 1937 Chevrolet			

=== 1963, NHRA Nationals, Indianapolis Raceway Park ===
Class	Entrant	Engine	Car (year and make)	Elapsed time (seconds)	Trap speed
A/GS	"Ohio George" Montgomery	Cadillac	1933 Willys	10.45	129.00 mph (207.61 km/h)
B/GS	Jack Merkel	Chevrolet	1937 Willys	10.95	130.05 mph (209.30 km/h)
C/GS	Sam Jones (Moody & Jones)	Chevrolet	1937 Chevrolet	11.70	117.80 mph (189.58 km/h)
A/G	Gene Altizer	Chevrolet	1951 Ford Anglia	11.03	127.84 mph (205.74 km/h)
B/G	Ron Hassell	Chevrolet	1940 Willys	12.27	116.88 mph (188.10 km/h)
C/G	Hill and Zartman	Chevrolet	1940 Willys Filthy Forty	12.70	110.42 mph (177.70 km/h)
D/G	Gene Moody	Chevrolet	1955 Chevrolet	12.58	110.97 mph (178.59 km/h)
E/G	Gerald Murphy	Chevrolet	1955 Chevrolet	13.54	103.80 mph (167.05 km/h)
F/G	Dave Koffel	Chevrolet	1949 Packard Flintstone Flyer	13.69	101.80 mph (163.83 km/h)
G/G	Bobby Vaughn	GMC	1934 Willys	13.79	101.91 mph (164.01 km/h)
H/G	Dave DeYoung (DeYoung & Theu)	GMC	1952 Chevrolet	14.77	91.83 mph (147.79 km/h)
AA/SR	Hugh Tucker	Oldsmobile	1928 Chevrolet	11.33	133.33 mph (214.57 km/h)
A/SR	Jim Parsons	Dodge	1927 Ford	12.17	121.13 mph (194.94 km/h)
B/SR	Scott Reider (Reider & Weiler)	Chevrolet	1932 Ford	11.98	116.42 mph (187.36 km/h)
C/SR	Ferrante & Costanzo	Ford	1923 Ford	13.71	98.68 mph (158.81 km/h)
AM/SP	Ron Waggoner	Chevrolet	Austin-Healey	11.52	125.34 mph (201.72 km/h)
BM/SP	Ron Hadley	Chevrolet	Corvette	12.48	114.64 mph (184.50 km/h)
CM/SP	Sam Cunningham	Chevrolet	Corvette	12.21	114.94 mph (184.98 km/h)
DM/SP	Bill Waddill		1961 Coventry	15.24	92.94 mph (149.57 km/h)
Middle Eliminator	"Ohio George" Montgomery	A/GS Willys			
Little Eliminator	Dave Strickler	A/FX 1963 Chevrolet			
Junior Eliminator	Scott Reider	B/SR 1932 Ford			

=== 1964, NHRA Nationals, Indianapolis Raceway Park ===
Class	Entrant	Engine	Car (year and make)	Elapsed time (seconds)	Trap speed
A/GS	"Ohio George" Montgomery	Cadillac	1933 Willys	10.20	138.88 mph (223.51 km/h)
B/GS	Jack Merkel	Chevrolet	1937 Willys	10.54	134.53 mph (216.51 km/h)
C/GS	Sam Jones (Moody & Jones)	Chevrolet	1937 Chevrolet	11.70	119.04 mph (191.58 km/h)
A/G	Lutz & Lundberg	Chevrolet	Ford Anglia	10.79	131.19 mph (211.13 km/h)
B/G	Ron Hassel	Chevrolet	1940 Willys	11.31	121.29 mph (195.20 km/h)
C/G	Alan Tschida	Chevrolet	1940 Willys	11.97	113.63 mph (182.87 km/h)
D/G	Gene Moody	Chevrolet	1955 Chevrolet	12.33	111.24 mph (179.02 km/h)
E/G	Wes Edwdards	Chevrolet	1956 Chevrolet	13.25	102.04 mph (164.22 km/h)
F/G	Ferd Napfel	Chevrolet	1955 Chevrolet	13.32	102.01 mph (164.17 km/h)
G/G	Jerry Haley	GMC	1933 Plymouth	12.54	107.39 mph (172.83 km/h)
H/G	Dave DeYoung	GMC	1952 Chevrolet	14.70	90.18 mph (145.13 km/h)
AA/SR	Hugh Tucker	Oldsmobile	1928 Chevrolet	11.03	128.93 mph (207.49 km/h)
A/SR	Jan Riedel	Chevrolet	1932 Ford	11.38	122.78 mph (197.60 km/h)
B/SR	Loren McCombs	Ford	Model A	13.89	(no speed recorded)
C/SR	Stan Young	Ford	Model T	13.29	103.68 mph (166.86 km/h)
AAM/SP	Sam Parriott	Ford	1963 Kurtis City of Industry	10.62	132.93 mph (213.93 km/h)
AM/SP	Joe Lunati	Chevrolet	Devin Trouble Maker	10.62	132.93 mph (213.93 km/h)
BM/SP	Neil Mahr	Chevrolet	Austin-Healey	11.33	123.95 mph (199.48 km/h)
A/MP	Bill Flynn		1964 Dodge	11.95	119.36 mph (192.09 km/h)
B/MP	Jess Platt	Chevrolet	1957 Corvette	12.12	(no speed recorded)
C/MP	Ralph Holloman		1955 Chevrolet	13.26	108.95 mph (175.34 km/h)
D/MP	Hoefer Bros.		1956 Chevrolet	13.41	(no speed recorded)
E/MP	Pete McNicholl	Chrysler slant 6	1933 Plymouth	14.31	93.07 mph (149.78 km/h)
Street Eliminator	Joe Lunati	Devin Trouble Maker			

=== 1965, NHRA Nationals, Indianapolis Raceway Park ===
Class	Entrant	Engine	Car (year and make)	Elapsed time (seconds)	Trap speed
A/GS	Doug Cook	Chrysler	1941 Willys	14.20	116.53 mph (187.54 km/h)
B/GS	Billy Holt	Chevrolet	1933 Willys	10.94	128.20 mph (206.32 km/h)
C/GS	Vinnie Tarantola	Chevrolet	1940 Willys	11.45	121.45 mph (195.45 km/h)
A/G	Carl Kirk	Chevrolet	Ford Anglia	10.60	130.43 mph (209.91 km/h)
B/G	Jim Oddy	Chevrolet	Ford Anglia	11.50	116.58 mph (187.62 km/h)
C/G	Zakia & Clark	Chevrolet	1955 Chevrolet	12.45	108.43 mph (174.50 km/h)
D/G	Thurman Taylor	Chevrolet	1955 Chevrolet	12.22	112.50 mph (181.05 km/h)
E/G	Ray Hausendobler	Chevrolet	1956 Chevrolet	13.22	104.77 mph (168.61 km/h)
F/G	Ferd Napfel	Chevrolet	1955 Chevrolet	13.26	105.67 mph (170.06 km/h)
G/G	Elroy Amundson	Chevrolet	1948 Ford Anglia	13.06	(no speed recorded)
H/G	Dave Ehrmann	Chevrolet	1939 Chevrolet	13.90	96.35 mph (155.06 km/h)
AAM/SP	Don Noyes	Chevrolet	1951 MG TD	10.52	141.50 mph (227.72 km/h)
AM/SP	Joe Lunati	Chevrolet	Devin Trouble Maker	10.33	138.24 mph (222.48 km/h)
BM/SP	Pete Ahrends	Dodge	Corvette	10.95	126.40 mph (203.42 km/h)
AA/SR	Al Dauernhelm	Chrysler	1929 Ford	10.32	126.93 mph (204.27 km/h)
A/SR	Lawlis & Remy	Dodge	1923 Ford	10.38	133.33 mph (214.57 km/h)
B/SR	Nick Nash	Chevrolet	1923 Ford	11.96	116.88 mph (188.10 km/h)
C/SR	Joe Cunningham	Chevrolet	1923 Ford	12.77	106.25 mph (170.99 km/h)
A/MP	Bill "Grumpy" Jenkins		1965 Plymouth	11.11	130.24 mph (209.60 km/h)
B/MP	Rufus Boswell	Chevrolet	1939 Chevrolet	11.77	118.11 mph (190.08 km/h)
C/MP	Ralph Ridgeway	Chevrolet	1956 Chevrolet	12.67	112.34 mph (180.79 km/h)
Street Eliminator	Ferd Napfel	F/G 1955 Chevrolet			

=== 1966, NHRA Nationals, Indianapolis Raceway Park ===
Class	Entrant	Engine	Car (year and make)	Elapsed time (seconds)	Trap speed
AA/G	"Ohio George" Montgomery	427 SOHC	1933 Willys	9.58	153.58 mph (247.16 km/h)
BB/G	Billy Holt	Chevrolet	1941 Willys	10.97	121.62 mph (195.73 km/h)
CC/G	Vinnie Tarantola	Chevrolet	1940 Willys	11.36	124.3 mph (200.0 km/h)
A/G	Dick Weinle	Chevrolet	1949 Anglia	10.57	130.62 mph (210.21 km/h)
B/G	Ron Hassell	Chevrolet	Ford Anglia	10.74	128.38 mph (206.61 km/h)
C/G	Bill Carroll	Chevrolet	1939 Willys	11.25	121.78 mph (195.99 km/h)
D/G	Harry Luzader	Chevrolet	1932 Ford	11.72	114.06 mph (183.56 km/h)
E/G	Gene Schwartz	Chevrolet	1951 Chevrolet	12.98	105.26 mph (169.40 km/h)
F/G	Gene Moody	Chevrolet	1955 Chevrolet	13.28	105.14 mph (169.21 km/h)
G/G	Thomas Langdon	Chevrolet	Ford Anglia	12.34	114.06 mph (183.56 km/h)
H/G	Dave Ehrmann	Chevrolet	1939 Chevrolet	13.63	97.19 mph (156.41 km/h)
AA/SR	Hugh Tucker	Chrysler	1928 Chevrolet	9.75	125.69 mph (202.28 km/h)
A/SR	Jim Parsons	Chrysler	1927 Ford	10.16	138.46 mph (222.83 km/h)
B/SR	Howie Nye	Chevrolet	1933 Plymouth	13.84	76.20 mph (122.63 km/h)
C/SR	T. J. Cunningham	Chevrolet	1923 Ford	11.80	115.38 mph (185.69 km/h)
AAM/SP	Guzman & Ward	Chevrolet	1958 MGA	9.90	141.40 mph (227.56 km/h)
AM/SP	Joe Lunati	Chevrolet	Devin Trouble Maker	10.31	139.96 mph (225.24 km/h)
BM/SP	Bob Schaefer		1966 Corvette	12.04	120.64 mph (194.15 km/h)
CM/SP	Marvin Sterling		1959 Corvette	11.60	118.57 mph (190.82 km/h)
DM/SP	Dick Moroso		1961 Corvette	13.32	103.21 mph (166.10 km/h)
A/MP	Fred Shallcross	Chevrolet	1941 Willys	11.40	127.11 mph (204.56 km/h)
B/MP	Dave Mosteller	Chevrolet	1953 Corvette	11.91	116.27 mph (187.12 km/h)
C/MP	Jim Griffith	Chevrolet	1957 Chevrolet	12.47	11.66 mph (18.76 km/h)
Street Eliminator	Joe Lunati	AM/SP Devin Trouble Maker			

=== 1967, NHRA Nationals, Indianapolis Raceway Park ===
Class	Entrant	Engine	Car (year and make)	Elapsed time (seconds)	Trap speed
AA/G	"Ohio George" Montgomery	427 SOHC	1933 Willys	8.92	134.32 mph (216.17 km/h)
BB/G	Joe Airoso	Chevrolet	1941 Willys	10.48	133.92 mph (215.52 km/h)
CC/G	Bill Lindner	Chevrolet	1937 Willys	10.91	129.12 mph (207.80 km/h)
A/G	Carl Kirk	Chevrolet	Ford Anglia	9.96	138.67 mph (223.17 km/h)
B/G	Bob Riffle	Chevrolet	Ford Anglia	10.54	128.22 mph (206.35 km/h)
C/G	Tony Russo	Chevrolet	1941 Willys	11.20	119.60 mph (192.48 km/h)
D/G	Jim Rodriguez	Chevrolet	1956 Chevrolet	11.64	116.42 mph (187.36 km/h)
E/G	Bob Blum	Chevrolet	1950 Ford	12.51	108.17 mph (174.08 km/h)
F/G	Ferd Napfel	Chevrolet	1955 Chevrolet	12.88	106.50 mph (171.40 km/h)
G/G	Dick Becker	Ford	1950 Ford Anglia	11.42	108.17 mph (174.08 km/h)
H/G	Dean Lowery		1965 Volkswagen Beetle	12.88	96.35 mph (155.06 km/h)
I/G	Bobby Vaughn	GMC	1934 International	14.71	(no speed recorded)
AA/SR	Mickey Hart	Chrysler	1923 Ford	9.61	152.02 mph (244.65 km/h)
A/SR	Larry Weitzel	Dodge	1923 Ford	9.84	139.53 mph (224.55 km/h)
B/SR	Howie Nye	Chevrolet	1933 Plymouth	11.28	121.13 mph (194.94 km/h)
C/SR	Buddy Shumaze	Chevrolet	1923 Ford	18.18	(no speed recorded)
AAM/SP	Lou Abel	Chrysler	Special	9.40	156.25 mph (251.46 km/h)
AM/SP	Dave Kanners	Chevrolet	1957 Corvette	9.55	133.13 mph (214.25 km/h)
BM/SP	Bill Manning	Chevrolet	1957 MGA	10.63	123.22 mph (198.30 km/h)
