= John Mulkey =

John Mulkey may refer to:

- John Mulkey (drag racer), American drag racer
- John H. Mulkey (1824–1905), American attorney and judge from Kentucky
