= 1962 NHRA Winternationals =

- Venue: Auto Club Raceway
- Location: Pomona, California

The 1962 NHRA Winternationals were a National Hot Rod Association (NHRA) drag racing event, held at Auto Club Raceway, Pomona, California on 18 February.

== History ==
The 1962 Winternationals were historic for the appearance there of NHRA's first woman class champion.

Under pressure from Peggy Hart (wife of track owner "Pappy" Hart) and Mickey Thompson, as well as fellow racers Shirley Shahan and Roberta Leighton, Carol Cox was the first woman allowed to race at an NHRA national event. Influenced in part by Thompson's preference for Pontiacs, Cox drove a 1961 Ventura with a 389cui/368HP V8, which was driven (not trailered) to Pomona. Cox won the title in S/SA (Super Stock, automatic transmission), making her the first woman ever to take a win at an NHRA national event; the 9 March 1962 issue of National Dragster recorded her as a "crowd favorite", with a winning pass of 13.06 seconds at 107.65 mph (173.25 km/h), but says nothing about it being a first for a woman, dismissively calling her a "'posder puff' handler". Some racers believe a class win is more difficult to achieve than a handicap (eliminator) win.

While Cox gained a lot of attention, "Sneaky Pete" Robinson and Tom McEwen (not yet nicknamed "Mongoo$e") both lost to Jim Nelson in the Dode Martin-owned Dodge Dart, on his way to a win in Top Eliminator.

Gary Cagle drove Dean Moon's Mooneyes dragster to victory in Middle Eliminator.

Bob Balough's Oldsmobile-powered Simca defeated Doug "Cookie" Cook in Junior Eliminator.

"Dyno Don" Nicholson took the victory in Stock Eliminator, over Dave Strickler in the Ammon Smith-owned Chevrolet.

In Street, Rich Siroonian, in the Mazmanian-owned 1962 Corvette, lost to K.S. Pittman. Earl Wade, in another 1962 Corvette, defeated Pittman in the final to win Street Eliminator.

Hugh Tucker claimed the Little Eliminator win.
