= Jim Parsons (disambiguation) =

Jim Parsons (born 1973) is an American actor.

Jim Parsons may also refer to:

- Jim Parsons (drag racer), American dragster driver
- Jim Parsons (politician), Canadian politician
- Jim Parsons (rugby union) (1943–2026), England international rugby union player
