= Jim Lightcap =

American gasser drag racer

Jim Lightcap is a pioneering American gasser drag racer.

Driving a GMC-powered Model A, Lightcap won NHRA's C/SR (C/Street; gas) national title at Detroit Dragway in 1960. His winning pass was 15.03 seconds at 77.5 mph (124.7 km/h).

The next year, Lightcap won a second NHRA C/Street national title, at Indianapolis. His winning pass there was 13.63 seconds at 102.04 mph (164.22 km/h).

== Sources ==
- Davis, Larry. Gasser Wars. North Branch, MN: Cartech, 2003, pp. 181–2.
