= Johnny Loper =

American gasser drag racer

Johnny Loper is a pioneering American gasser drag racer.

Driving a 1959 Chevrolet, he won NHRA's E/Gas national title at Detroit Dragway in 1959. His winning pass was 14.94 seconds at 93.45 mph (150.39 km/h).

The next year, at the wheel of an Oldsmobile-powered 1941 Willys, he won NHRA's first ever B/Gas Altered (B/GA) national title at Detroit Dragway. His winning pass was 13.72 seconds at 108.82 mph (175.13 km/h).

At the NHRA Nationals, held at Indianapolis Raceway Park, in 1962, Loper won the B/Gas title, with a Chevrolet-powered Willys. He turned in a winning pass of 12.04 seconds at 111.11 mph (178.81 km/h).

Loper was first three-time national champion to move up a class in his later wins, from E/G to B/G.

Loper was also first ever B/Gas Altered champion, in 1960.

== Sources ==
- Davis, Larry. Gasser Wars, North Branch, MN: Cartech, 2003, pp. 181–2.
