= 1963 NHRA Winternationals =

- Venue: Auto Club Raceway
- Location: Pomona, California

The 1963 NHRA Winternationals (commonly known as the Winternats) were a National Hot Rod Association (NHRA) drag racing event held at the Auto Club Raceway in Pomona, California on February 17, 1963.

== Events ==
Jack Williams' new slingshot streamliner Scuderia made her debut at this year's Winternats, in Top Gas. She also won the "Best Appearing" award.

The event was attended by a number of name cars, including Melrose Missile III (driven by Tommy Grove) and Old Hoss (in B/G, driven by Johnny Loper).

== Results ==
=== Top Fuel ===
In the Top Fuel Dragster (TF/D) final round, Don Garlits (not yet nicknamed "Big Daddy") defeated Art Malone.

Garlits would go on to take Top Fuel Eliminator, in Swamp Rat V, with a pass of 8.26 seconds at 186.32 mph (299.85 km/h).

=== Top Gas ===
Scuderia made her debut, recording a best pass of 8.83 seconds at 169.17 mph (272.25 km/h) with Ron Lowe at the wheel, before mechanical trouble sidelined her.

Doug Cook, in Swindler, took the AA/G win.

The class win went to Bob Muravez (in the John Peters and Nye Frank-owned Freight Train) over Connie Kalitta. Freight Train also posted both top speed (185+) and low E.T. (8.36) of the meet for gas dragsters.

=== Competition Eliminator ===
Tony Nancy defeated Jerry Hardick to win the Comp Eliminator trophy.

=== Middle Eliminator ===
Doug "Cookie" Cook claimed Middle Eliminator in his Oldsmobile-engined Willys, Swindler (co-owned by Stone, Woods, and Cook), over Jim Dunn.

=== Junior Eliminator ===
Hugh Tucker defeated Bob Culbert at Pomona in 1962 to win Junior Eliminator.

=== Little Eliminator ===
Charlie Smith was defeated by Dick Bourgeois in Little Eliminator.

=== Stock ===
In Stock Eliminator, Al Eckstrand in a 1963 Dodge defeated Bill Shirey in a 1963 Plymouth.

The A/Stock class win went to Dave Strickler.
