= Tarantola =

Tarantola is a surname. Notable people with the surname include:

- Albert Tarantola (1949–2009), Spanish-born physicist
- Anna Maria Tarantola (born 1945), Italian manager, former director of the Bank of Italy and former President of Rai
- Daniel Tarantola (born 1949)
- Laura Tarantola (born 1994), French rower
- Vinnie Tarantola, American gasser drag racer
