= Scott Reeder =

Scott Reeder may refer to:

- Scott Reeder (bassist) (born 1965), American bass guitarist
- Scott Reeder (artist) (born 1970), American artist and filmmaker
- Scott Reeder (drummer), American drummer
- Scott Reider, American drag racer
