= Zaiser =

Zaiser is a surname. Notable people with the surname include:

- Lisa Zaiser (born 1994), Austrian swimmer
- Maximilian Zaiser (born 1999), German footballer
- Steve Zaiser (born 1951), American politician
- Wilton Zaiser, American drag racer

== See also ==
- Gaiser
- Zaisser
- Zaiter
