= Jim Koonce =

American gasser drag racer

Jim Koonce is an American gasser drag racer.

Driving a 1955 Chevrolet (with a transplanted Chevrolet engine), Koonce won NHRA's C/G national championship at Detroit Dragway in 1960. His winning pass was 14.31 seconds at 102.04 mph (164.22 km/h).

In the same car, Koonce won the E/Gas title at Indianapolis Raceway Park in 1961, with a pass of 14.07 seconds at 96.20 mph (154.82 km/h).

== Sources ==
- Davis, Larry. Gasser Wars, North Branch, MN: Cartech, 2003, p. 182.
