= City of Industry (disambiguation) =

City of Industry is a city in Los Angeles County, California.

City of Industry may also refer to:

- City of Industry (film), a 1997 crime film directed by John Irvin
- City of Industry (car), a name of two gassers in the 1950s and '60s

== See also ==
- Industrial city, a city in which the municipal economy, at least historically, is centered around industry
- Industry City (also Bush Terminal) is an intermodal shipping, warehousing, and manufacturing complex in Brooklyn, New York City
- South San Francisco, California, a city in the San Francisco Bay Area known as "The Industrial City"
