= Al Zerbarini =

American gasser drag racer

Al Zerbarini (died 2 May 2012) was an American gasser drag racer.

Zerbarini drove an Oldsmobile-powered 1940 Willys dubbed Bee Line, sponsored by Bee-Line Automotive of Stamford, Connecticut, beginning in 1960.

Zerbarini won NHRA's first ever A/Gas Altered (A/GA) national title at Detroit Dragway in 1960. His winning pass was 12.61 seconds at 106.88 mph (172.01 km/h).

Zerbarini continued racing until 1968 but won no other NHRA gasser titles.

== Sources ==
- Davis, Larry. Gasser Wars, North Branch, MN: Cartech, 2003, pp. 180–6.
