= Dick Jasper =

American Drag Racer

Richard C. Jasper (commonly known as “Dick") is a pioneering American gasser drag racer. With wins in 1957 and 1958, Jasper became just the second National Hot Rod Association (NHRA) two-time national classes champion, following Ralph Richter.

== History ==
Driving a Chevrolet-powered 1934 Ford, Jasper won the NHRA C/Gas (C/G) national title in Oklahoma City, Oklahoma, in 1957. He recorded a pass of 14.28 seconds at 96.56 mph (155.40 km/h).

Jasper repeated in Oklahoma City in 1958, turning in a pass of 13.76 seconds at 99.22 mph (159.68 km/h).

By winning two titles, Jasper became NHRA's second two-time national class champion. He was the first to achieve it in C/G.

== Sources ==
- Davis, Larry. Gasser Wars, North Branch, Minnesota: Cartech, 2003, p. 181.
