= James Parsons =

James Parsons may refer to:

- James Parsons (footballer) (born 1997), Australian footballer
- James Parsons (physician) (1705–1770), English physician, antiquary and author
- James Parsons (rugby union) (born 1986), New Zealand rugby union footballer
- James Parsons (South Carolina politician), (born 1724), 2nd vice president of South Carolina
- James Parsons Building of Liverpool John Moores University
- James A. Parsons (c. 1868–1945), New York State attorney general, 1914
- James Benton Parsons (1911–1993), U.S. federal judge
- James K. Parsons (1877–1960), U.S. Army officer
- James M. Parsons, justice of the Iowa Supreme Court
- James R. Parsons (c. 1830–1905), Australian educator
- Dick Parsons (coach) (James R. Parsons, born 1938), retired American basketball and baseball coach
- J. Graham Parsons (1907–1991), American diplomat
- Jim Parsons (drag racer), American gasser drag racer
- Jim Parsons (born 1973), American actor
