= Hugh Tucker (drag racer) =

Hugh Tucker is an American gasser drag racer. Tucker was the first driver to win three National Hot Rod Association (NHRA) national championships in a gas supercharged class.

== Racing career ==
Driving an Oldsmobile-powered 1928 Chevrolet, he won NHRA's A/SR (gas) national title at the NHRA Nationals, held at Indianapolis Raceway Park, in 1962. His winning pass was 11.14 seconds at 130.24 mph (209.60 km/h). At the Winternationals, he claimed the Little Eliminator win.

The next year, Tucker added a supercharger to the Oldsmobile engine. At the NHRA Nationals in Indianapolis, he again won the AA/SR national title. His winning pass there was 11.33 seconds at 133.33 mph (214.57 km/h). He also claimed Junior Eliminator at the Winternationals, over Bob Culbert.

One year later, at the NHRA Nationals at Indianapolis, Tucker took a second AA/SR national title, with a pass of 11.03 seconds at 128.93 mph (207.49 km/h).

In 1966, a Chrysler hemi replaced the Oldsmobile. At the NHRA Nationals in Indianapolis, Tucker took his third (and final) AA/SR national title, with a pass of 9.75 seconds at 125.69 mph (202.28 km/h).

== Sources ==
- Davis, Larry. Gasser Wars. North Branch, MN: Cartech, 2003, pp. 180–6.
