= John H. Mulkey =

American judge

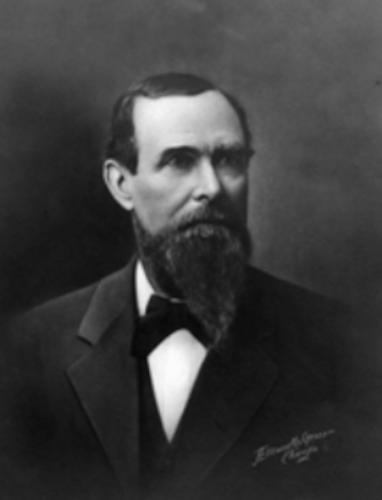
- Mulkey's portrait at the Illinois Supreme Court.

Justice of the Supreme Court of Illinois
- In office 1879–1888
- Preceded by: David J. Baker Jr.
- Succeeded by: David J. Baker Jr.

Personal details
- Born: May 24, 1824; Monroe County, Kentucky
- Died: July 9, 1905 (aged 81); Metropolis, Illinois
- Spouse(s): Margaret Cantrell, Kate House
- Profession: Attorney

John H. Mulkey (May 24, 1824 – July 9, 1905) was an American attorney and judge from Kentucky. Mulkey worked a series of jobs until William J. Allen loaned him his law books in 1851 so that he could study. Two years later, Mulkey was admitted to the bar and practiced in Southern Illinois. He served a short term on an Illinois circuit court and then was elected to the Supreme Court of Illinois in 1879 for a nine-year term.

== Biography ==
John H. Mulkey was born in Monroe County, Kentucky on May 24, 1824. He was the second son born to physician Isaac Mulkey and Abigail Ragin. The family moved to LaFayette, Kentucky when Mulkey was young. Upon reaching adulthood, Mulkey moved to nearby Hopkinsville, Kentucky to apprentice as a tailor. Mulkey then attended Bacon College, where he trained to become a teacher. He moved to Southern Illinois upon graduating, settling in Benton after a lengthy search. Mulkey taught there until 1847.

In July 1847, Mulkey enlisted as a volunteer to fight in the Mexican–American War. He was mustered out when the conflict ended the next year. For the next five years, he moved around Southern Illinois seeking work. He farmed on a tract of land awarded to him for his war service and did some trading, mainly in horses. In 1851, he began to study law from books loaned to him by William J. Allen. Two years later he was admitted to the bar by Willis Allen.

Mulkey moved to Desoto, Illinois to practice for two years. He briefly lived in Cairo, Illinois in 1857 until moving to Du Quoin after a flood. He served as Judge of Common Pleas for Cairo from 1861 to 1867. In 1864, he was elected to the third Illinois circuit court and moved to Jonesboro to be near the center of the circuit. He served on that court for less than a year and then returned to Cairo. He opened a law firm with William J. Allen, Samuel P. Wheeler, David T. Linegar, and John McMurray Lansden.

On June 2, 1879, Mulkey was elected to the Supreme Court of Illinois. He served one nine-year term, succeeding David J. Baker Jr. He was chief justice of the court for one term from 1885 to 1886. Mulkey largely retired from law after his term was complete. Mulkey wrote an opinion regarding the will of Chicago industrialist John Crerar. He started a farm in Metropolis in 1884.

Mulkey married Margaret Cantrell on March 23, 1846; they had eight children. He died in 1871 and he later remarried to Kate House. They had two children. Originally a Campbellite, Mulkey converted to Catholicism in 1883. Mulkey died in Metropolis on July 9, 1905.
