= Zaisser =

Zaisser is a surname. Notable people with the surname include:

- Elisabeth Zaisser (1898–1987), German politician and Minister for People's Education in the East Germany
- Wilhelm Zaisser (1893–1958), German politician and Minister for State Security in the East Germany

== See also ==
- Zaiser
