= Sam Jones (drag racer) =

American gasser drag racer

Sam Jones is an American gasser drag racer. He won the C/Gas title in 1962 and 1963.

== History ==
Driving the Chevrolet-powered Moody & Jones 1937 Chevrolet, Jones won NHRA's C/GS national title at the NHRA Nationals, held at Indianapolis Raceway Park, in 1962. His winning pass was 12.43 seconds at 113.20 mph (182.18 km/h). He also won Gas Street Eliminator at Indianapolis in 1962.

The next year, Jones won a second NHRA C/GS national title, at the Nationals in Indianapolis, again driving the Moody & Jones gasser. His winning pass there was 11.70 seconds at 117.80 mph (189.58 km/h).

== Sources ==
- Davis, Larry. Gasser Wars. North Branch, MN: Cartech, 2003, pp. 182–3.
