= Zaiter =

Zaiter or Zeaiter is a surname. Notable people with the surname include:

- Daniel Zeaiter (born 1995), Lebanese-German footballer
- Ghazi Zaiter (born 1949), Lebanese politician
- Nouh Zaiter (born 1977), Lebanese drug lord
- Sandra Zaiter (born 1943), Puerto Rican actress, television host, singer, composer, and athlete

== See also ==
- Zaiser
