= Sam Parriott =

American drag racer

- Nationality: American

Sam Parriott is an American drag racer.

Driving a Cadillac-powered Kurtis-Kraft sports cars named City of Industry (variously a 1953 or 1963 Kurtis), Parriott won several NHRA national gasser titles.

In his 1953 Cadillac V8-powered Kurtis-Kraft 500S sports car, he took A/SP (A Production) at Oklahoma City, Oklahoma in 1958 (with a pass of 12.17 seconds at 122.44 mph (197.05 km/h)), AM/SP (A Modified Production) at Detroit Dragway in 1960 (with a pass of 12.29 seconds at 130.62 mph (210.21 km/h)), and at Indianapolis Raceway Park in 1961 (with a pass of 11.91 seconds at 128.20 mph (206.32 km/h)) and 1962 (with a pass of 12.53 seconds at 111.80 mph (179.92 km/h)).

In his second car, a 1962 Kurtis-Kraft Aguila, powered by a supercharged big block Ford FE engine, Parriott won the national AAM/SP (A Modified Production supercharged) title at Indianapolis Raceway Park in 1964 with a 10.62/132.93 mph (213.93 km/h) pass.

== Sources ==
- Davis, Larry. Gasser Wars, North Branch, MN: Cartech, 2003, pp. 180–8.
