= Warren Turner =

American gasser drag racer

Warren Turner is a pioneering American gasser drag racer.

Driving a Chrysler-powered Allard, he won NHRA's first ever A/SP national title at Great Bend, Kansas in 1955. His winning speed was 104.89 mph (168.80 km/h). (His elapsed time was not recorded or has not been preserved.)

== Sources ==
- Davis, Larry. Gasser Wars, North Branch, MN: Cartech, 2003.
