= Dean Moon =

American racing driver (1927–1987)

- Born: May 1, 1927; United States
- Died: June 4, 1987 (aged 60); United States
- Occupations: Automobile designer, race car driver

Dean Moon (May 1, 1927 – June 4, 1987) was an American automobile designer.

== Biography ==
Moon grew up in Norwalk, California, and was around cars and racing from his youth. His father owned "Moon Café" and had a go-kart track he called "Moonza", a pun on Monza. Dean was involved in dry lakes hot-rodding in the late 1940s. He founded MOON Speed Equipment (c.1950) and worked to improve the quality and safety of speed and racing products his entire life.

Moon was one of the founding members of Specialty Equipment Manufacturers Association in 1963.

Dean Moon was a hot-rodder and innovator of speed parts. He built and raced cars from El Mirage Dry Lake and Bonneville Salt Flats to the drag strips and beyond, and established a company that became well known in the hot rodding industry. Starting his business from modest beginnings in a garage behind his father's Moon Café in Norwalk, he grew it into an internationally recognized brand name. Early products were a multi-carb fuel block, spun aluminum wheel discs, aluminum gas tanks and a foot-shaped throttle pedal. Products carrying the Moon name, including the Moon disc wheel covers and Moon Tank auxiliary fuel containers, were very popular, and Moon Equipment's bright-yellow show cars and drag cars were used as prototypes for Hot Wheels toys.

In 1960 Moon purchased the Potvin company from Chuck Potvin, a good friend and manufacturer of ignitions, camshafts and blower drives. In 1962, he moved the company to the Moon Equipment building in Santa Fe Springs, California, and continued producing Potvin products.

The first A.C. Shelby Cobra to reach the United States, delivered to Carroll Shelby, was fitted with a Ford V8 engine and transmission at Dean Moon's shop in Santa Fe Springs, in February 1962. This historic location at 10820 S. Norwalk Blvd. is where MOONEYES still resides today.

Moon brought a level of showmanship to the sport of drag racing. His cars not only went fast but looked good with signature Mooneyes decals, yellow paint and chrome plating. His teams wore white uniforms with the MOON Logo and cowboy hats. Revell made a plastic model kit of the Chevrolet-powered Dragmaster-chassied Mooneyes dragster, which they termed as a rolling testbed (driven by Gary Cagle to a win at the 1962 NHRA Winternationals), then as exhibition car shows after it retired from racing. The car made a comeback in England in 1963 driven by Dante Duce. In 1964 Duce won the Brighton Speed Trials in the Moonbeam, a Devin-bodied sports car equipped with a supercharged Chevrolet V-8 motor.

Moon Speed Equipment temporarily "paused" after Dean died in 1987, then appeared to shut down after Dean Moon's wife died. In the early 1990s, Shige Suganuma (a long time Mooneyes dealer from Japan and close family friend of Moon) restarted the company as MOONEYES USA which continues to carry on the traditions of Dean Moon today, including the Mooneyes Hot Rod & Custom Show in Yokohama, Japan.
