= Joe Hrudka =

American gasser drag racer

Joe Hrudka is a pioneering American gasser drag racer.

Driving a 1957 Chevrolet, he won NHRA's D/Gas national title at Indianapolis Raceway Park in 1961. His winning pass was 12.73 seconds at 105.26 mph (169.40 km/h).

The next year, at the wheel of the Peters & Betz team's 1955 Chevrolet (with a transplanted Chevrolet engine), he won a second NHRA DGas national title at Indianapolis. His winning pass there was 13.37 seconds at 105.63 mph (170.00 km/h).

In 1967, the Hrudka Brothers' 1933 Willys panel delivery was a popular wheelstander.

Hrudka would later found Mr. Gasket (now a division of Holley Performance Products.

== Sources ==
- Davis, Larry. Gasser Wars. North Branch, MN: Cartech, 2003, p. 181.
