= City of Industry (car) =

Name of two types of hot rod cars

Overview
- Production: 1958 and 1964
- Designer: Sam Parriott

Body and chassis
- Class: Gasser
- Body style: Roadster
- Layout: Front-Mid Engine RWD
- Platform: 1953 and 1963 Kurtis Kraft 500S
- Doors: none, Roofless
- Chassis: Aluminum Monocoque
- Related: Kurtis Kraft 500S

Powertrain
- Engine: City of Industry I: 5,973.49 cubic centimetres (364.5 cu in) 365 Cadillac V8 NA; City of Industry II: 7,735 cubic centimetres (472.0 cu in; 7.7 L) 472 Cadillac V8 with a Supercharger
- Power output: City of industry I: 531 horsepower (538.4 PS; 396.0 kW) @ 8,000 rpm 536 pound-feet (726.7 N⋅m) @ 5,500 rpm City of industry II: 649 horsepower (658.0 PS; 484.0 kW) @ 9,000 rpm 711 pound-feet (964.0 N⋅m) @ 6,000 rpm
- Transmission: 3-speed Manual transmission

Dimensions
- Wheelbase: 2,540 millimetres (100.0 in)
- Length: 4,400 millimetres (173.2 in)
- Width: 1,727 millimetres (68.0 in)
- Height: 865 millimetres (34.1 in)
- Curb weight: City of Industry I: 1,427 pounds (647.3 kg); City of Industry II: 1,639 pounds (743.4 kg)

City of Industry is one of two gassers sharing the name.

The first car named City of Industry was a Cadillac-powered 1953 Kurtis. It won the NHRA national titles in A/SP (A Production) at Oklahoma City, Oklahoma in 1958 (with a pass of 12.17 seconds at 122.44 mph (197.05 km/h)), AM/SP (A Modified Production) at Detroit Dragway in 1960 (with a pass of 12.29 seconds at 130.62 mph (210.21 km/h)), and at Indianapolis Raceway Park in 1961 (with a pass of 11.91 seconds at 128.20 mph (206.32 km/h)) and 1962 (with a pass of 12.53 seconds at 111.80 mph (179.92 km/h)).

The second was a Cadillac-powered 1963 Kurtis. It won the national AAM/SP (A Modified Production supercharged) title at Indianapolis Raceway Park in 1964 with a 10.62 at 132.93 mph (213.93 km/h) pass. Despite its relatively high power, the cars transmission, a 3-speed Manual, would be geared in such a way that it would get relatively little of its power down, and as such it would spin its wheels all the way through its pass.

Both were driven by Sam Parriott throughout their racing careers.

== Sources ==
- Davis, Larry. Gasser Wars, North Branch, MN: Cartech, 2003, pp. 180–8.

== See also ==
- Cadillac High Technology engine
