= Filthy Forty =

1960s Gasser

- Category: Gasser
- Designer: Charlie Hill
- Predecessor: none
- Successor: The next car built by Charlie hill would be a Chevrolet Corvette (C3)

Technical specifications
- Chassis: 1940 Willys
- Length: 170.1 inches (4,320 mm)
- Width: 56.9 inches (1,445.3 mm)
- Height: 58.25 inches (1,479.5 mm)
- Axle track: 39.6 inches (1,005.8 mm) (Front); 57.5 inches (1,460.5 mm) (Rear)
- Wheelbase: 104.0 inches (2,642 mm)
- Engine: Turbo Fire Small Block 4,638 cubic centimetres (283.0 cu in) V8 NA Front Engine, RWD
- Transmission: BorgWarner 4-speed (6.58 ratio) Manual transmission
- Power: 435 brake horsepower (441.0 PS; 324.4 kW) @ 9,500 rpm 440 pound-feet (596.6 N⋅m) @ 5,300 rpm
- Weight: 1,731 pounds (785.2 kg)
- Tires: Goodyear

Competition history
- Notable drivers: Charlie Hill
Entries	Races	Wins	F/Laps	Titles
60	60	46	1 (1964)	3

The Filthy Forty is a gasser from the early 1960s.

Filthy Forty is a Chevrolet 283-powered 1940 Willys entered by the team of Hill & Zartman. It won the NHRA C/G national title at the 1963 Nationals, at Indianapolis Raceway Park, with a pass of 12.70 seconds at 110.42 mph (177.70 km/h), and would win the 1964 Nationals with a pass at 11.95 seconds at 116.82 mph (188.00 km/h). The car would end up sold to a racing team in Wisconsin, where it would be destroyed in a crash in 1965.

The Chevrolet 283 V8 used in the car would be modified with JE Pistons, Crane Engineering Headers and a Isky Racing Camshaft. The engine would run a Compression ratio of 14:1, and a maximum Horsepower and RPM up from 310 bhp (314.3 PS; 231.2 kW) @ 5,500 rpm to 435 bhp (441.0 PS; 324.4 kW) @ 9,500 rpm. The engine would be fit to a BorgWarner 4-speed, with a 6.58 Gear Ratio. The new Small-Block engine, significantly larger than the 2,199 cc (134.2 cu in; 2.2 L) Go-Devil I4, would mean that even with the significant weight reduction, it would only lose around 385 lb (174.6 kg) from the standard Willys.

== Sources ==
- Davis, Larry. Gasser Wars, North Branch, MN: Cartech, 2003, pp. 180–188.
