= Ferd Napfel =

Ferd Napfel is an American gasser drag racer who won three NHRA national F/Gas (F/G) titles..

== History ==
Driving a Chevrolet-powered 1955 Chevrolet gasser, Napfel won three NHRA national F/Gas (F/G) titles.

At the 1964 NHRA Nationals, held at Indianapolis Raceway Park, he won F/G with a pass of 13.32 seconds at 102.01 mph (164.17 km/h).

Napfel won his second F/G title at Indianapolis the next year, in the same car, turning in a 13.26 second pass at 105.67 mph (170.06 km/h). Napfel also won the Street Eliminator crown at Indy that year.

In 1967, Napfel claimed a third F/G national title, again at Indianapolis, clocking 12.88 seconds at 106.50 mph (171.40 km/h).

== Sources ==
- Davis, Larry. Gasser Wars, North Branch, MN: Cartech, 2003, pp.184-5.
