= Wilton Zaiser =

American gasser drag racer

Wilton Zaiser is an American gasser drag racer.

In 1956, at the NHRA national meet in Kansas City, Missouri, Zaiser won A/Gas. His Oldsmobile-powered 1931 Ford turned in a pass of 13.32 seconds at 108.82 mph (175.13 km/h).

Zaiser took a second gasser class win at Detroit Dragway in Detroit, Michigan, in B/GS in 1960, with an Oldsmobile-powered 1941 Willys. He recorded a pass of 11.84 seconds at 121.29 mph (195.20 km/h).

== Sources ==
- Davis, Larry. Gasser Wars, North Branch, MN: Cartech, 2003, pp. 180 and 181.
