= Dale Ham =

American gasser drag racer

Dale Ham is a pioneering American gasser drag racer.

Driving a Dodge-powered 1929 Ford, he won NHRA's first-ever C/SR (C Street) championship, at Great Bend, Kansas, in 1955. His winning speed was 91.64 mph (147.48 km/h). (His elapsed time was not recorded or has not been preserved.)

Ham won no other NHRA national gasser championships.

== Sources ==
- Davis, Larry. Gasser Wars, North Branch, MN: Cartech, 2003, p.180.
