= Dick Cadwalader =

American gasser drag racer

Dick Cadwalader (died April 22, 2018) was a pioneering American gasser drag racer. He was from Chalfont, Pennsylvania.

Driving an Oldsmobile-powered 1933 Ford, Cadwalader won NHRA's first ever A/G national title, at Great Bend, Kansas, in 1955. He recorded a speed of 96.87 mph (155.90 km/h). (His elapsed time was not recorded or has not been preserved.)

== Sources ==
- Davis, Larry. Gasser Wars, North Branch, Minnesota: Cartech, 2003, p.180.
