= Owen Bowling =

American gasser drag racer

Owen Bowling is a pioneering American gasser drag racer.

Driving a Chrysler-powered 1929 Ford, Bowling won NHRA's first ever A/SR (A Street) national title, at Great Bend, Kansas, in 1955. He recorded a speed of 88.75 mph (142.83 km/h). (His elapsed time was not recorded or has not been preserved.)

== Sources ==
- Davis, Larry. Gasser Wars, North Branch, MN: Cartech, 2003, pp. 13 caption and 183–8.
