= Red Lund =

American gasser drag racer

Red Lund is a pioneering American gasser drag racer.

Driving a Ford-powered 1932 Ford, he won NHRA's first-ever B/SR (B Street) championship, at Great Bend, Kansas, in 1955. His winning speed was 96.15 mph (154.74 km/h). (His elapsed time was not recorded or has not been preserved.)

Lund won no other NHRA national gasser championships.

== Sources ==
- Davis, Larry. ''Gasser Wars, North Branch, MN: Cartech, 2003, p.180-6.
