= Ray Moore (drag racer) =

American gasser drag racer

Ray Moore is an American gasser drag racer.

Driving a Chevrolet-powered 1940 Willys dubbed Chicken Coupe, Moore won NHRA's B/GS national championship at Indianapolis Raceway Park in 1961. His winning pass was 11.76 seconds at 120.32 mph (193.64 km/h).

== Sources ==
- Davis, Larry. Gasser Wars, North Branch, MN: Cartech, 2003, pp. 182 & 187.
