= John Mulkey (drag racer) =

John Mulkey is an American gasser drag racer.

In 1956, Mulkey won NHRA's B/SR (B Street) championship at Kansas City, Missouri, driving a 1932 Ford powered by a transplanted Ford engine. He recorded a pass of 14.43 seconds at 99.22 mph (159.68 km/h).

Mulkey repeated his class win at Oklahoma City, Oklahoma in 1958, the Ford now powered by a small-block Chevrolet. His winning pass was 13.36 seconds at 104.65 mph (168.42 km/h).

By winning two titles, Mulkey became NHRA's third two-time national class champion. He was first to achieve it in B/SR.

Mulkey's winning 1932 Ford was used in the science fiction movie "The Giant Gila Monster" The Giant Gila Monster. In the finale, Chase, the hero of the movie, loads the car with nitro and runs it into the monster gila monster and destroys it and the car. In reality a model of the car is destroyed, not the actual race car.

== Sources ==
- Davis, Larry. Gasser Wars, North Branch, MN: Cartech, 2003, pp. 180 and 181.
