= Ralph Richter =

American drag racer

Ralph Richter is a pioneering American gasser drag racer. He was the first National Hot Rod Association (NHRA) two-time national class champion, in 1955 and 1956.

== History ==
Driving a 1955 Porsche, Richter won NHRA's first ever B/SP national title, at Great Bend, Kansas, in 1955. He recorded a speed of 84.19 mph (135.49 km/h). (His elapsed time was not recorded or has not been preserved.)

Richter repeated with a win in B/SP at Kansas City, Missouri in 1956, driving a 1956 MGA. He recorded a pass of 20.13 seconds at 69.44 mph (111.75 km/h)

By winning two titles, Richter became NHRA's first two-time national class champion. He was first to achieve it in B/SP.

== Sources ==
- Davis, Larry. Gasser Wars, North Branch, MN: Cartech, 2003, p. 180.
