= Vinnie Tarantola =

American gasser drag racer

Vinnie Tarantola is an American gasser drag racer, the first to win two National Hot Rod Association (NHRA) national titles in the class.

== History ==
Driving a Chevrolet-powered 1940 Willys gasser, Tarantola won two NHRA national class titles.

Tarantola's first was in C/GS, at the 1965 NHRA Nationals, at Indianapolis Raceway Park. His winning pass was 11.45 seconds at 121.45 mph (195.45 km/h).

Tarantola followed up with a win in CC/G (adding a supercharger to the Chevrolet engine) at Indianapolis in 1966. There, his win was an 11.36 second pass at 124.30 mph (200.04 km/h).

== Sources ==
- Davis, Larry. Gasser Wars, North Branch, MN: Cartech, 2003, pp.184-5.
