= Bill Devin =

American entrepreneur and automobile builder

- Born: November 13, 1915; Rocky, Oklahoma, USA
- Died: November 24, 2000 (aged 85)

William Elbert Devin Junior (November 13, 1915 – November 24, 2000) was an American businessperson, automotive entrepreneur and racing driver. He is primarily known as the founder of Devin Enterprises, a company that built fiberglass body-kit conversions and complete automobiles.

== Early years ==
Devin was born on November 13, 1915, in Rocky, Oklahoma, USA. Devin's father ran an auto repair shop and later a Chevrolet dealership, giving his son an early exposure to cars and their workings. The first "vehicle" often credited to Devin was a small open-top child's car built for his younger brother Gene out of an old metal sign and powered by a motor salvaged from a gasoline-powered washing machine.

Devin became the only gas-welder in his town and kept busy working on oil rigs, farm equipment and cars. He also used his welding and fabricating skills to salvage several motorcycles.

The family left Oklahoma during the third drought of the Dust Bowl years in 1939 and moved to California. Some time after arriving in California Devin went to work for the Douglas Aircraft Company. His first job was to build and maintain the jigs and fixtures used to manufacture the aircraft. Later he became a crew chief on the flight line for the Douglas A-20 Havoc light bomber. In this job he gained experience in electrical and hydraulic systems as well as aircraft engines and structures.

After this Devin spent 31 months in the United States Navy. He worked as a machinist's mate until being assigned to an assault transport unit where he became a motor mechanic responsible for maintaining the landing craft.

== Car dealerships and early racing career ==
By 1945 Devin was out of the Navy and had returned to California with the intention of establishing a car dealership of his own. When he could not arrange financing in California Devin relocated to Montour, Iowa, where he opened a Chrysler-Plymouth dealership, a Crosley dealership and two farm equipment dealerships. These ventures were successful but in 1949 Devin returned once again to California and established a Chrysler-Plymouth dealership in Fontana the following year.

1949 was also the year Devin bought one of the just-released Crosley Hotshots and began to modify it. He installed a cam ground by Clay Smith (the original Mr. Horsepower) to get more power from the car's CIBA SOHC 750 cc (45.8 cu in) engine. The first auto race that Devin attended was also the first ever race at Santa Ana in 1950. In August 1951 Devin took the modified Hotshot to Buchannan Field California and won in the novice race on his first outing as a racing driver. He placed fifth in the main race that same day. Devin would go on to race the Hotshot at tracks like Pebble Beach, Palm Springs, Torrey Pines and elsewhere, competing and often winning against larger MGs and Jaguars.

Devin later sold his Fontana dealership and partnered with Ernie McAfee in a plan to sell exotic-cars. McAfee had a facility with a circular former drive-in restaurant building which would serve as offices, while a Quonset hut was built to serve as a showroom. This location quickly became a favorite haunt for people involved in motor sports at the time, like Henry N. Manney III. An initial order for 25 Siatas was placed, but the venture rapidly stalled and the unsold Siatas were bought from the company by Bill Doheny.

== Devin's Ferraris ==
Phil Hill drove a 2.6 litre Ferrari 212 in the 1952 Carrera Panamericana and crashed during the race. His crew patched the car back together well enough for Hill to finish sixth. Devin bought this car (chassis 0092 E) later through Luigi Chinetti. After picking it up in El Paso Texas and repairing it he started racing it himself.

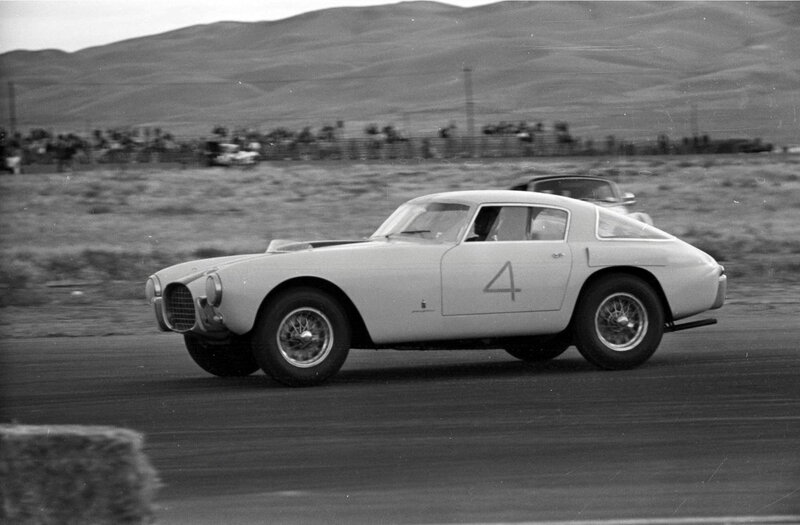
Devin in his Ferrari 250 MM 0312MM near Reno on 18 October 1953.

In 1953 Devin ordered a new 3.0 litre Ferrari 250MM coupe in preparation for a run at Le Mans. He went to Italy with Chinetti to pick the car up, but on their arrival in Modena they were told that the 250MM (chassis 0312MM) would not be ready in time for Le Mans. Since the 250MM wasn't ready, Devin bought a two-litre Ferrari 166 MM Touring Barchetta (chassis 0050M) that had been owned by Porfirio Rubirosa as well as a 4.1 litre 340 America with bodywork by Vignale, reported to have been either the chassis 0202A spyder or the 0206A berlinetta.

Devin did not keep the 166 MM long, selling it as soon as it landed in the US. He drove the 340 America in a few races before selling it. In 2006 a Ferrari 340 America with chassis number 0202A was discovered that had received both a Chevrolet V8 engine and a Devin fiberglass body at some time around the year 1958. When it was rediscovered by Tom Shaughnessy it became one of the most famous "barn-finds" and was documented in a chapter called "Between the Devin and the deep blue sea" in the book "The Hemi in the Barn".

Devin debuted the 250MM at the Sports Car Club of America 3rd Annual Members' Madera race on September 20 where he finished third in the novice event before turning the car over to Phil Hill, who won the main event. The car appeared at a few more events driven either by Devin or his brother Gene before being sold in June 1954. Part of the purchase price of the car was a small French front-wheel drive Deutsch-Bonnet taken in trade. The 250MM was featured on the cover of the July 1955 issue of Road & Track magazine and again in a feature article in the July 1965 issue of the same magazine when it was bought by a new owner.

Devin would later branch out from the Ferraris, driving cars from OSCA, Porsche, Arnolt-Bristol and the little Deutsch-Bonnet.

== Devin Enterprises ==
In 1954 Devin established his company, Devin Enterprises, to begin selling the first of his own cars.

This first car was the Devin-Panhard. On a chassis of his own design Devin mounted a body produced from a mold of the Deutsch-Bonnet he had taken in trade. To make the body Devin had to teach himself to work in the still relatively new medium of fiberglass. Powering the car was a 745 cc (45.5 cu in) two-cylinder Panhard boxer engine, but Devin modified the engine in a way that made it unique. Devin adapted overhead-camshaft cylinder heads from a motorcycle to the engine and then drove the camshafts by a synchronous toothed belt, building the first such engine with a timing belt. Devin did not patent this system.

Following his work on the Devin-Panhards, Devin began to sell aftermarket fiberglass bodies for custom sports cars. Beginning with a pattern from a small Italian spyder Devin developed a series of 50 sections of molds that allowed him to produce the Devin body in up to 27 different sizes to fit a variety of chassis. Devin would eventually become the largest and most successful manufacturer of fiberglass bodies in the world.

As the business grew he expanded into producing accessories and chassis which could be bought along with the bodies.

Devin's next project was to produce a new car, the Devin Super-Sport, or SS. Using a chassis built in Ireland and a Chevrolet small-block V8 with a body specific to the SS, the car was priced at US$5950.00 for the first years of production, rising to US$10,000.00 in the last year. Devin also sold a scaled-down version of this car called the Devin Junior that was powered by a 2 HP motor and intended for pre-teens.

Devin subsequently released another car, the Devin D, at a lower price than the SS. The Devin D used a Devin chassis and another new body. This car's suspension was made up of Volkswagen parts, while power was provided by a rear-mounted engine from either Porsche or Volkswagen.

Shortly after Chevrolet released their Corvair, Devin launched the Devin C with the same body as the Devin D but a new chassis adapted to use the six-cylinder boxer engine from the Corvair. The Devin C was also the basis of a new premium hard-top model called the Devin GT.

== Later life ==
In the July 1961 issue of Car and Driver magazine the American automotive journalist Henry N. Manney III wrote about Bill Devin. In the article, entitled "The Enzo Ferrari of Okie Flats", Manney described Devin as a conjurer, an enthusiast and "Crazy like a fox". He said that "(Devin's) unerring eye for the ridiculous and sense of timing" caused Manney to recommend that everyone that could take a trip to see him perform.

Bill Devin died on November 24, 2000. He was survived by wife Mildred Delia Devin, sons Bill Devin III, Joel Devin, and John Devin and daughters Valerie Provines and Linda Ryssman.

Mildred Devin died on February 15, 2013, at 89 years of age.
