= Scott Reider =

American gasser drag racer

Scott Reider is an American gasser drag racer.

Driving a Chevrolet-powered 1932 Ford, Reider won NHRA's B/SR (B/Street; gas) national title at the NHRA Nationals, held at Indianapolis Raceway Park, in 1962. His winning pass was 12.65 seconds at 112.78 mph (181.50 km/h).

The next year, Reider won a second NHRA B/SR national title, at Indianapolis, in the Reider & Weiler Deuce. His winning pass there was 11.98 seconds at 116.42 mph (187.36 km/h). He also won Gas Junior Eliminator at Indianapolis in 1963.

== Sources ==
- Davis, Larry. Gasser Wars. North Branch, MN: Cartech, 2003, pp. 181–2.
