= David J. Baker Jr. =

American judge

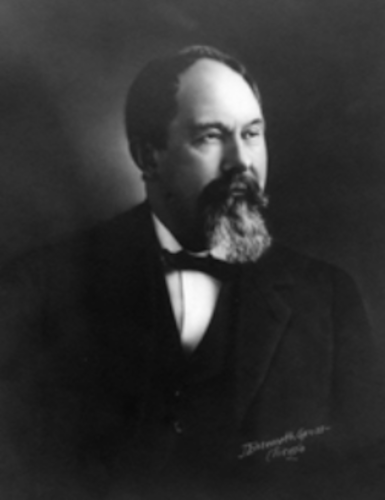
- Baker's portrait at the Illinois Supreme Court.
- Born: November 20, 1834; Kaskaskia, Illinois
- Died: March 13, 1899 (aged 65); Cairo, Illinois
- Occupations: lawyer and judge
- Parent: David J. Baker

David Jewett Baker Jr. (November 20, 1834 – March 13, 1899) was an American jurist who served as a justice of the Illinois Supreme Court, including a tenure as chief justice.

== Early life and education ==
He was the son of David J. Baker. Born in Kaskaskia, Illinois, Baker received his bachelor's degree from Shurtleff College in 1856.

== Legal and Judicial Career ==
Baker was admitted to the Illinois bar in 1856 and moved to Cairo, Illinois to practice law. Baker served as city attorney and then as mayor of Cairo, Illinois in 1864 and 1865. From 1868 to 1878, Baker served as an Illinois state court judge. In 1878 and 1879 and from 1888 to 1893, Baker served on the Illinois Supreme Court and was chief justice.

== Notable Case ==
In 1895, Justice Baker issued a ruling in Zirngibl et al. v. Calumet & C. Canal & Dock Co. et al., which protected the grave of Andreas von Zirngibl, located on private property owned by a dock company. The decision allowed the grave to remain undisturbed, and it remains surrounded by an active scrap yard today.

== Death ==
Baker died suddenly in his law office in Cairo, Illinois.
