= Devin Enterprises =

American automotive manufacturer

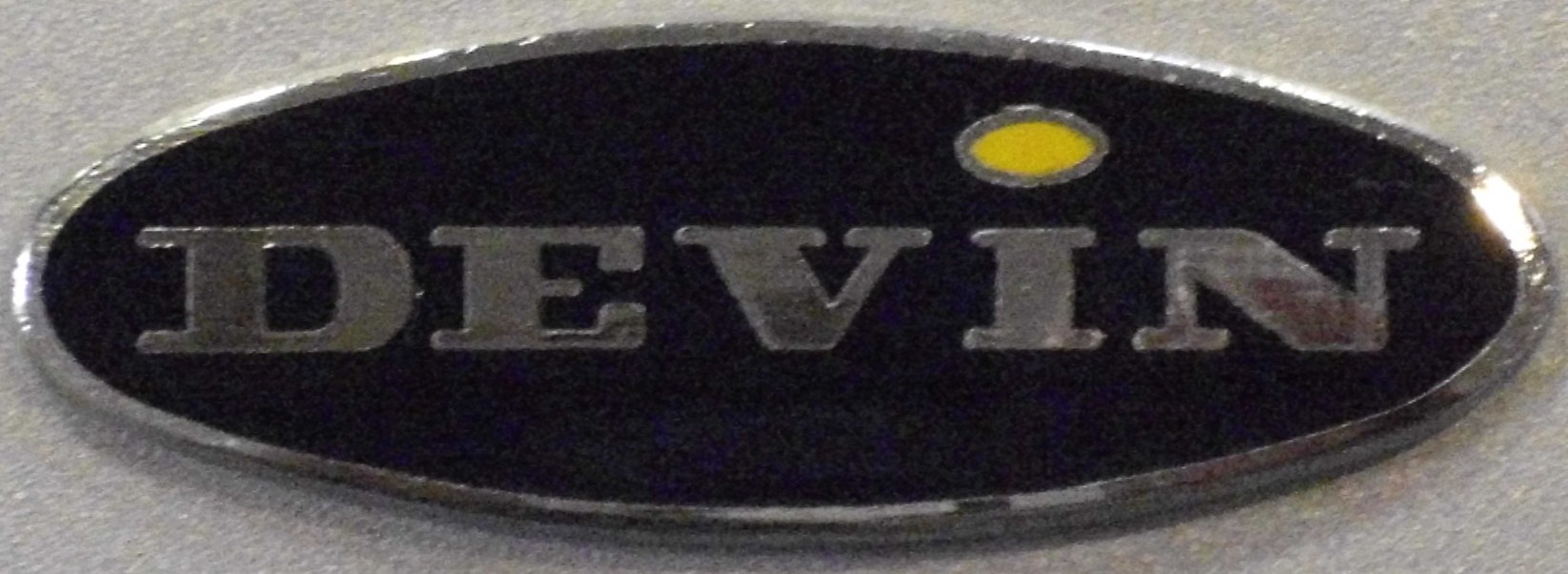
- Industry: Automotives
- Founder: Bill Devin
- Products: Parts and accessories; Body kits; Complete automobiles

Devin Enterprises was an American automotive manufacturer that operated from 1955 to 1964. Devin was mainly known for producing high quality fiberglass car bodies that were sold as kits, but they also produced automotive accessories as well as complete automobiles. The company was founded by Bill Devin.

The assets and intellectual property of Devin Enterprises were acquired by Devin Sports Cars LLC of Glendale California U.S.A, incorporated in 2001. These assets and intellectual properties were then acquired in 2019 by Devin Sports Cars, LLC of Abington Pennsylvania U.S.A, where they exist today.

== The Devin Panhard ==
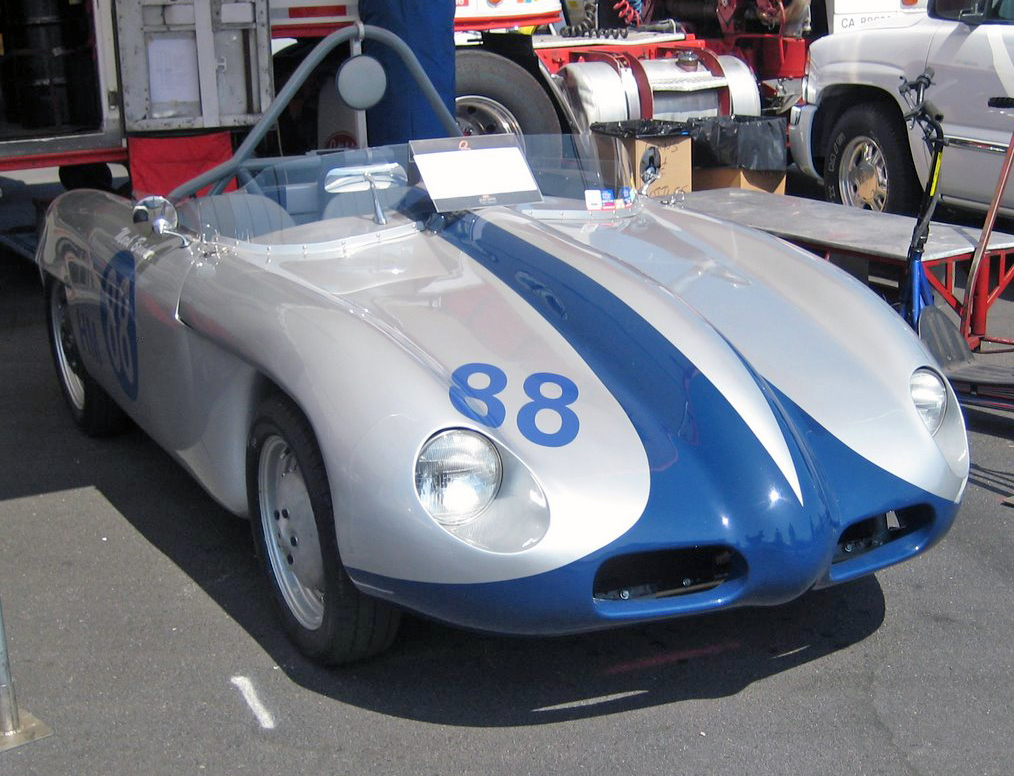
Devin Panhard

When Bill Devin sold his Ferrari 250 MM coupe to a buyer in Michigan in 1954 he took a 1953 Deutsch-Bonnet Le Mans barquette in trade as partial payment. Devin also bought out the stock of a Panhard dealer in California, acquiring ten chassis with engines but no bodies.

Devin designed his own ladder frame for a custom race car that used the engine and front-wheel drive transaxle from the Panhards. The wheelbase of this chassis was 2,134 millimetres (84 inches). Devin also took a mold of the body of the DB Le Mans, made some changes, and began to produce custom bodies for his new car. This was his first experience working with fiberglass.

With help from Norton motorcycle racer Don Evans, Devin adapted the cylinder barrels, cylinder heads and pistons from the Norton Manx motorcycle to the two-cylinder boxer Panhard crankcase, roller-bearing crankshaft assembly and piston rods. He then fabricated a custom manifold that accepted two-barrel side-draft Weber carburetors. All of these alterations did not affect the displacement of the engine, leaving the 79.5 mm bore and 75 mm stroke unchanged for a total displacement of 745 cc.

What made the engine unique was the method Devin used to operate the valves. He abandoned the Panhard's pushrod OHV system and contacted the L. H. Gilmer company about using their toothed belts to drive the Manx cylinder heads' overhead cams. Development of synchronous toothed-belts was begun by the Gilmer company around 1940. Their primary application had been as a means of transmitting power in textile mills. Devin's use of the technology to drive the valve train in the Devin-Panhard engine was the first time toothed belts were used in a timing belt application. Devin did not apply for a patent on this innovation.

The Devin-Panhards went into production in 1955 with engine options that included OHV, SOHC and DOHC variations of 750 cc and later 850 cc displacements. Another version of the engine came with a MAG supercharger, which bumped the car up into the 1100 cc class.

== Devin bodies and kits ==
In their earliest advertising copy Devin Enterprises listed a mailing address of P.O. Box 357, Fontana, California. Later on they used a street address of 44500 Sierra Highway, Lancaster, California and later still 10156 Rush, South El Monte, California before moving operations to their most well-known location at 9800 E. Rush Street, El Monte, California.

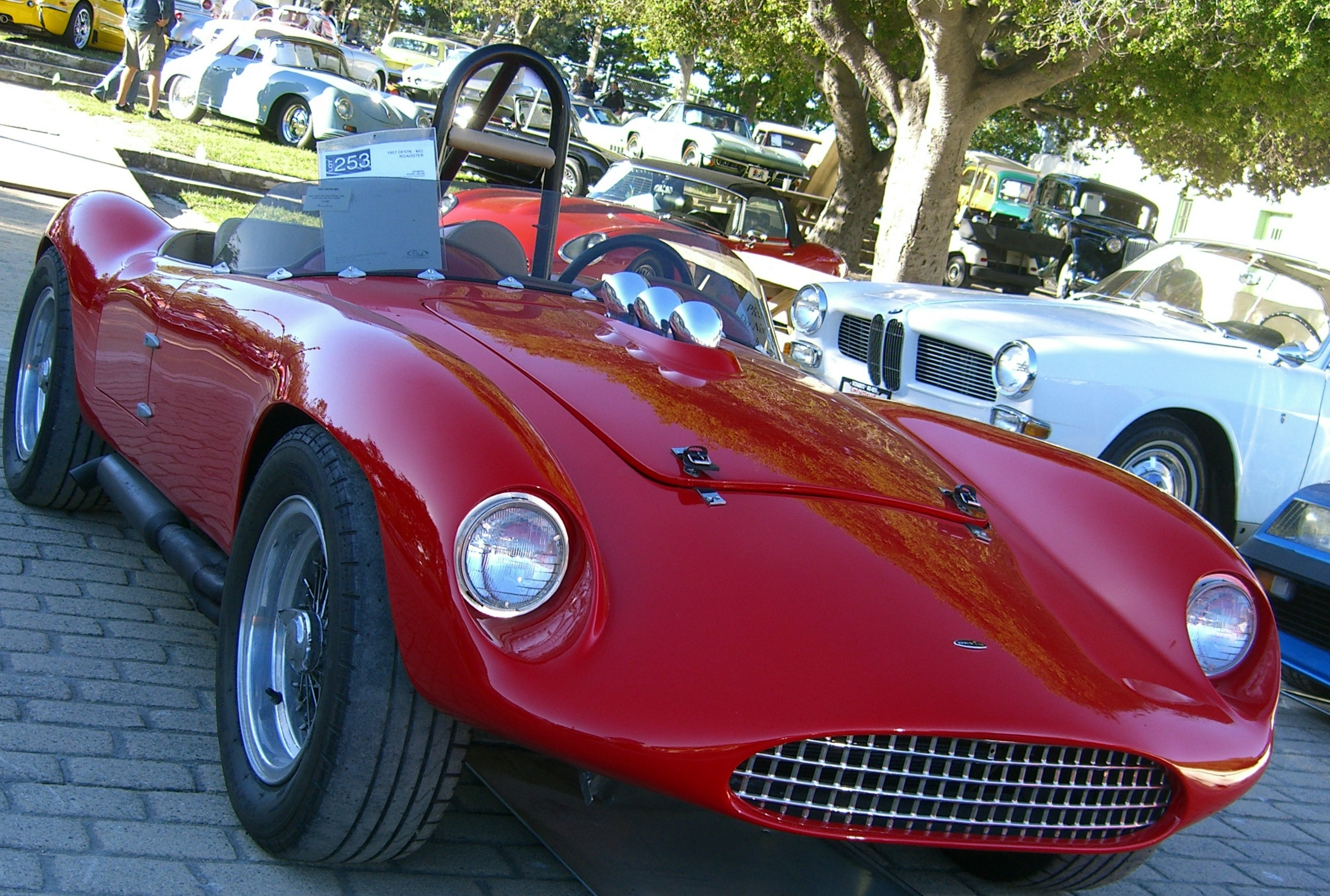
1957 Devin MG with a Chevrolet V8

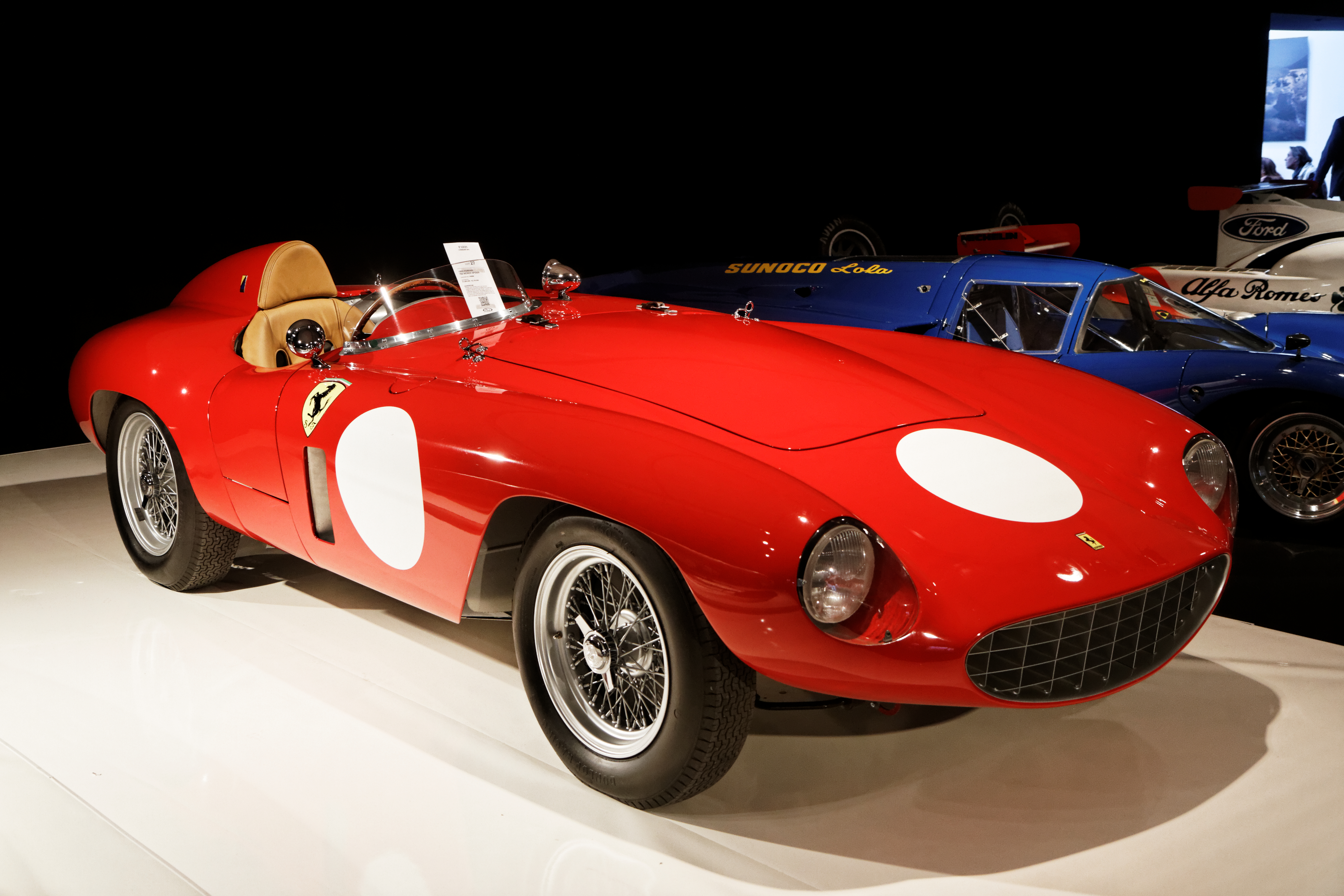
The real Scaglietti-bodied Ferrari 750 Monza of 1955

After gaining experience making complete fiberglass bodies with the Devin-Panhards, Devin Enterprises expanded into production of fiberglass bodies to be sold to builders of custom and one-off specialty cars. Production started in 1956.

The first design Devin produced was an attractive roadster-style body.

The most commonly attributed source for the Devin body's shape is that it was developed from a mold taken of an Ermini 357 Sport 1100 with aluminium bodywork by Scaglietti. The car was serial number 1255, and was owned by James Orr, who was a friend of Bill Devin's and who had raced the second Devin-Panhard ever produced. The Ermini's body closely resembled the design that Scaglietti had done for the larger Ferrari 750 Monza, and some of Devin's own early ad copy refers to these bodies as Devin Monzas. This body was advertised widely at a price of US$295.00, and so at times is also called the '295' body.

Apart from the appealing shape and reasonable price, two things distinguished the Devin bodies from their competition. One was the wide range of sizes of bodies available. The Devin body mold was not a simple one-piece shape. Instead, an assortment of 50 differently sized molds of individual sections of the body were used. These could be assembled in a variety of ways to create one of 27 possible sizes for a customer's fiberglass body. This allowed the company to produce a recognizable Devin body that would fit a wide variety of chassis, from the tiny Crosley, through the British MGs, Triumphs and Healys right up to some American car frames.

The other feature that made the Devin bodies popular was the high quality of the finish. Devin used fibreglass cloth for the outer layer of their bodywork rather than the coarser glass mat often used by other manufacturers. This produced a very smooth surface finish on the bodies. Devin bodies were always very smooth and the quality of finish on panel edges and large flat surfaces was often better than that of competitors' products.

Later, kits could be bought that included a Devin-designed ladder frame as an option along with the body.

Devin quickly became the world's largest and most successful producer of aftermarket fiberglass bodies. Between direct sales and dealers Devin bodies were delivered throughout the Americas as well as Europe, South Africa and Saudi Arabia.

=== Well-known Specials ===
The wide range of sizes that the Devin body was made in allowed it to be used on a very broad spectrum of cars. Rebodied Alfas, MGs, Triumphs and Healys were common as were specials built from a variety of American parts. Devin bodies were also fitted to rear-engined Volkswagens, Porsches, and Renaults as well as a front-wheel drive Panhard Dyna (distinct from the Devin-Panhards). Many of these cars became successful racers. Others became known because of who their builder or owner was. This is selection of these specials.

==== Ak Miller Specials ====
Akton "Ak" Miller was a long-time hot-rodder and racing driver as well as NHRA vice-president. He built a series of five or six Miller-Devin specials powered by a variety of engines. Three of the cars raced at the Pikes Peak hill climb.

Miller built his first Devin-bodied special in 1958 for the Pikes Peak hill climb. Built to run in the sports car class that had been announced the previous year, the car was named the Hot Rod Magazine Special in honor of its sponsor. Miller fabricated a custom steel tube frame that used a coil-spring front suspension from a 1956 Chevrolet and a Ford rear axle with a Halibrand quick-change differential. Springing was by torsion bars. The engine was a small-block Chevrolet that had been bored and stroked to 5,572 cubic centimetres (340 cubic inches) and equipped with Hilborn injection. The 4-speed manual transmission was from a Corvette. The finished car weighed 816 kilograms (1,800 pounds). Miller's Devin-Chevy won its class at Pikes Peak that year.

The next year Miller built an all-new car with another Devin body. A new ladder chassis of steel tube was used, with front suspension from a 1953 Chevrolet. Brakes came from a 1952 Lincoln and the steering box from a 1937 Ford. This car was also called the Miller-Hanson Special in recognition of George Hanson, who had fronted the $1800 needed to build the car. The engine for the Miller-Hanson special was an Oldsmobile, modified to displace 6,883 cubic centimetres (420 cubic inches) and fitted with four Rochester carburetors mounted on a drag racing intake manifold. The transmission was the same as that used in the Miller-Chevy. The total weight of the car was 953 kilograms (2,100 pounds). At the Pikes Peak climb the car developed engine problems but still won its class. The next year Miller could only manage fourth place, but when the car went back to Pikes Peak in 1961 it won again.

The third Miller special was built in 1962. Ford had approached Miller and arranged for him to use a factory-stock 406 FE V8 engine. The car won again at Pikes Peak that year. The following year it would win again, this time with a Ford 427 engine. After the 1963 race, the car was retired and converted for street use. For 1964 a new car was built using an AC Bristol chassis and a 289 CID engine. The car was renamed the Cobra Kit Special. It did not win that year but returned to the winner's circle in 1965. In 1966 the engine was once again a Ford 427 and this would be the final Miller win in the sports car class at Pikes Peak. The following year the class was discontinued.

==== Dean Moon "Moonbeam" Special ====
Dean Moon, dry lake racer and founder of MOON Speed Equipment, built a Devin-bodied special called Moonbeam in partnership with NHRA president Wally Parks. The car was meant to be the first of a series of cars optimized for straight-line runs on the drag strip and the Bonneville salt flats. A box-type frame was fabricated from mild steel tubing by Harley Klentz. The chassis had a track width of 1,270 millimetres (50 inches) and a nominal wheelbase of 2,540 millimetres (100 inches), but the wheelbase could be adjusted by up to 102 millimetres (4 inches). Front and rear axles were both solid, with the front being an I-beam unit from a Ford and the rear also being Ford but with a Halibrand quick-change center. Suspension was done by Monroe coil-over shock absorbers and the axles were located by trailing arms and a Watt's linkage. Brakes were Mercury-Bendix and the wheels were magnesium Halibrands. The first engine used was a 4,965 cubic centimetres (303 cubic inches) Chevrolet small-block V8 with a GMC 4-71 Roots-type supercharger blowing through a Potvin intake manifold and Hilborn fuel injection. When this engine did not perform as expected, it was replaced with a 4,769 cubic centimetres (291 cubic inches) Chevrolet.

Moonbeam held strip records at the Pomona, Henderson Nevada, Riverside (quarter- and half-mile), and San Gabriel tracks and also held the Modified Sports and the 1320 record of the American Hot Rod Association.

==== The Echidnas ====
The Echidnas were three Devin-bodied specials built by Ed Grierson, Bill Larson, and John Staver. The Echidnas were built on shortened, narrowed 1956 Chevrolet passenger-car frames with custom cross-bracing. Front suspension was independent using many stock Chevrolet sedan and Corvette parts including coil-springs, links, a-arms and, at least initially, steering boxes. Morris Minor rack-and-pinion steering was adapted later. Brakes were Corvette drums all around and the wheels were standard Corvette items. The rear suspension was a narrowed Chevrolet live axle with Positraction that was located originally on factory leaf springs, but in later revisions by trailing arms (one or two per side depending on version) and a Watt's linkage. The early engines were Chevrolet small-block V8s displacing 4,638 cubic centimetres (283 cubic inches) with Rochester fuel injection. A later change put a 5,555 cubic centimetres (339 cubic inches) engine in one car. The transmission was a BorgWarner T-10 4-speed manual. An article in the May 1960 edition of Sports Cars Illustrated magazine said that to the date of the article the Echidnas had managed eight overall firsts and 17 firsts in their class, finishing first, second or third a total of 19 times overall. The same article reported that the Echidna's designers were considering building a fourth chassis as a test-bed for investigating independent rear suspensions.

==== Clair Reuter Bandini Devin Crosley ====
Cliff Reuter has documented the history of a Bandini 750 Siluro that he acquired from the estate of the late Clair Reuter. This car received its Devin body when the SCCA stopped allowing cycle-fendered cars to compete. These 750 Bandinis used either a modified Crosley CIBA SOHC engine or a more highly customized Bandini-Crosley with a Bandini DOHC cylinder-head.

==== Richard Boone Devin-Porsche ====
Richard Boone owned a Porsche Speedster that was damaged while he was on location. In the May 1958 edition of Motor Trend magazine the actor himself wrote about the car and having Devin do the customization. This car was believed to have been lost in a fire at Boone's home but there is some recent evidence that the car survived.

== Accessories ==
In addition to the bodies and frames, Devin sold a growing assortment of accessories needed to complete the car. Some of these items were developed by Devin Enterprises, such as hinges and catches. One piece of advertising copy from 1960 lists a "universal" intake manifold for the Chevrolet V8 as well as a finned alloy differential housing for a de Dion rear suspension. Other items sold included everything from suspension parts, disk brakes or finned alloy brake drums up to wood-rimmed steering wheels, flip-up filler caps for fuel or oil tanks, Borrani wire wheels with knock-offs, custom gauges, and BID clutch plates.

== Devin Junior ==
For several years in the late 1950s Devin offered what they described as a "Gas Engine Powered Miniature Sports Car". The brochure for the Devin Junior said that it was not a toy but rather a scale replica of "a famous American sports roadster". The Junior was offered in two versions; standard and deluxe. The standard version was priced at the same US$295.00 as a full-sized Devin body. The deluxe version came with a semi-flexible plastic safety windshield, padded headrest and washable interior upholstery and sold for US$319.00. Powering both versions was a 2 HP gas engine (e.g., a Continental four cycle engine, a standard in quarter midget racing). The Junior measured 2,210 mm (87 in) long by 914 mm (36 in) wide and 533 mm (21 in) high to the top of the cowl. The head rest added 76 mm (3 in) to the overall height. The wheelbase was 1,245 mm (49 in) long and the track front and rear was 787 mm (31 in).

== Devin SuperSport ==
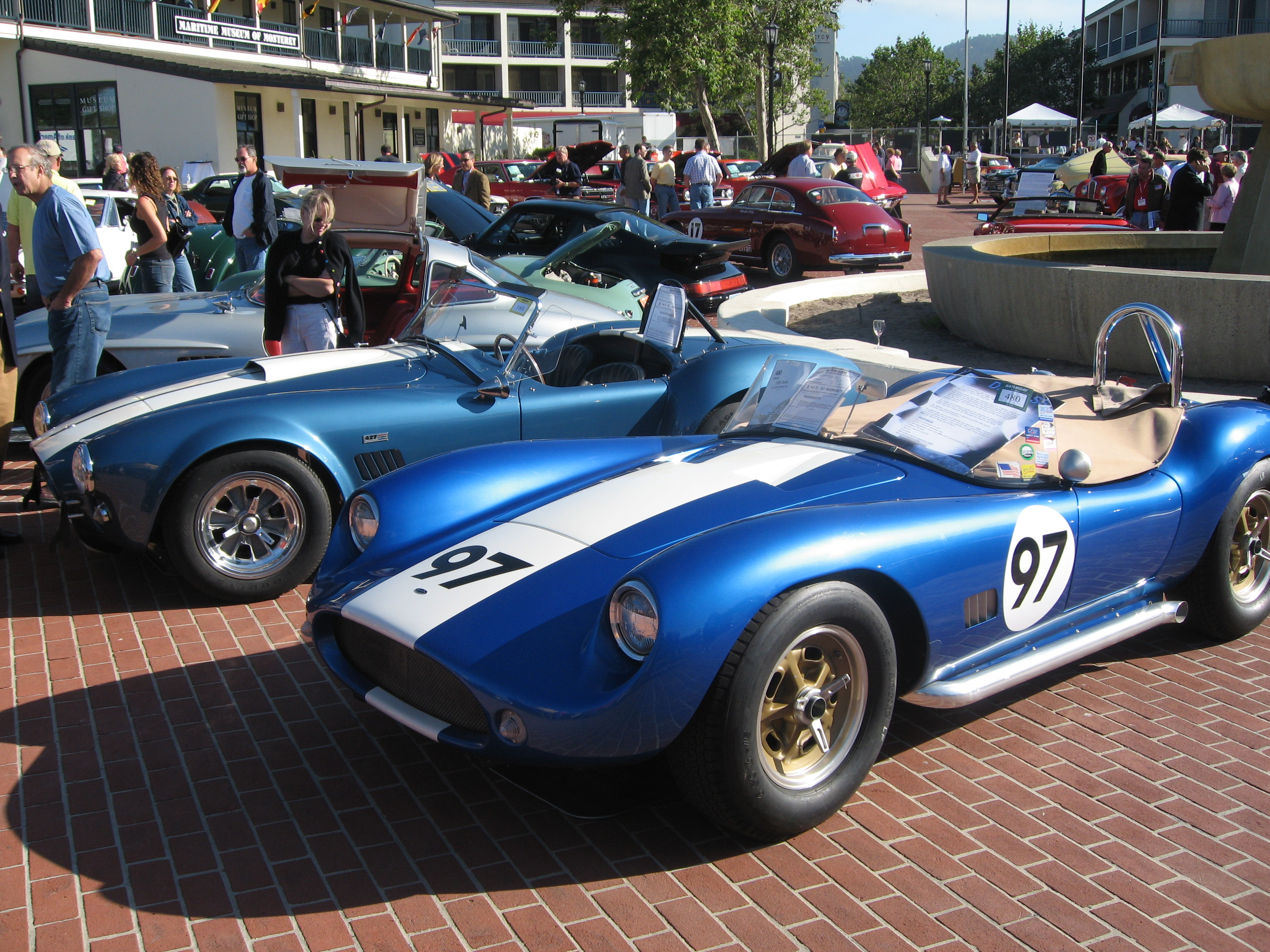
Devin SS (1958)

In 1957 Devin was contacted by two textile engineers from Belfast, Northern Ireland. Noel Hillis owned a hemstitching company called Devonshire Engineering, and Malcolm MacGregor worked for Hillis. Both men were racing enthusiasts who decided to build their own car. Hillis provided the workshop space while MacGregor designed the chassis. They wrote to Devin to ask about arranging for a custom body for their car. Bill Devin was interested enough in the project that he flew to Ireland to look at the car. Instead of selling them a body, Devin negotiated a deal with the two Irish engineers for MacGregor's chassis to be used for a new Devin car.

Devin asked for some changes for the final car. For the main chassis members, 76 mm (3 in) round cross-section tubing replaced the 102 mm (4 in) diameter tubing in the prototype. The 2,337 mm (92 in) production wheelbase was a compromise between the 2,286 mm (90 in) of the prototype and the 2,388 mm (94 in) that Devin had originally asked for. The battery and generator were relocated to the rear of the car, with the generator being driven off a pulley at the differential.

The ladder-type chassis used 51 mm (2 in) tubing for the front and rear sub-structures. Front suspension was by equal-length upper and lower A-arms. The early tubular steel arms were replaced by forged aluminum in later cars. At the rear were two trailing links per side and a de Dion axle with a 3.73:1 ratio Salisbury differential that received a finned aluminum cover made by Devin. A Woodhead-Monroe coil-over-shock-absorber at each wheel handled springing and damping. Brakes were by Girling, with 305 mm (12 in) disks at the front and 279 mm (11 in) disks mounted inboard at the rear. Dunlop tires were mounted on Dunlop knock-off wire wheels. Steering was by a BMC rack-and-pinion unit with 2.5 turns lock-to-lock. The interior had two bucket seats and was trimmed in carpet. The dash, designed for either left- or right-hand drive builds, had Stewart-Warner gauges, including a 200 mile-per-hour speedometer and a 10,000 RPM tachometer.

Devin designed a new body specifically for the car. The front-mounted radiator was angled forward, and the car did not come with a radiator fan, which combined to permit an extremely low nose. While early bodies had a rounded rear, later versions had a raised and flattened rear with room for a license plate. Later cars also had enlarged headlamp buckets.

The prototype's Jaguar DOHC inline six-cylinder engine was replaced by a 4,638 cc (283 cu in) Chevrolet OHV small-block V8. In Devin tune this engine had a low-rise intake manifold made by Devin and a Spaulding "Flamethrower" ignition and developed 164 kW (220 bhp) of power, which went to the rear wheels through a BorgWarner T-10 4-speed manual transmission. This resulted in a 988 kg (2,179 lb) car with a 0–100 km/h time of 4.8 seconds and a top speed of 225 km/h (140 mph).

The new car was called the Devin Super Sport, or SS. The rolling chassis was built in Ireland and then shipped to El Monte where the body and power-train was fitted and the interior trimmed. Released in 1959, the SS was initially priced at US$5950.00.

Art Evans partnered with his father and Ocee Ritch to make Evans Industries the sole distributor for the SS.

Due to a variety of issues with the Irish chassis Devin designed a replacement that was made in California and was called the American chassis. The price for the cars made with the American chassis rose to US$10,000.00 in the last year of production.

Evans Industries ended their distributor relationship with Devin in a press release dated March 9, 1960.

== Devin D ==
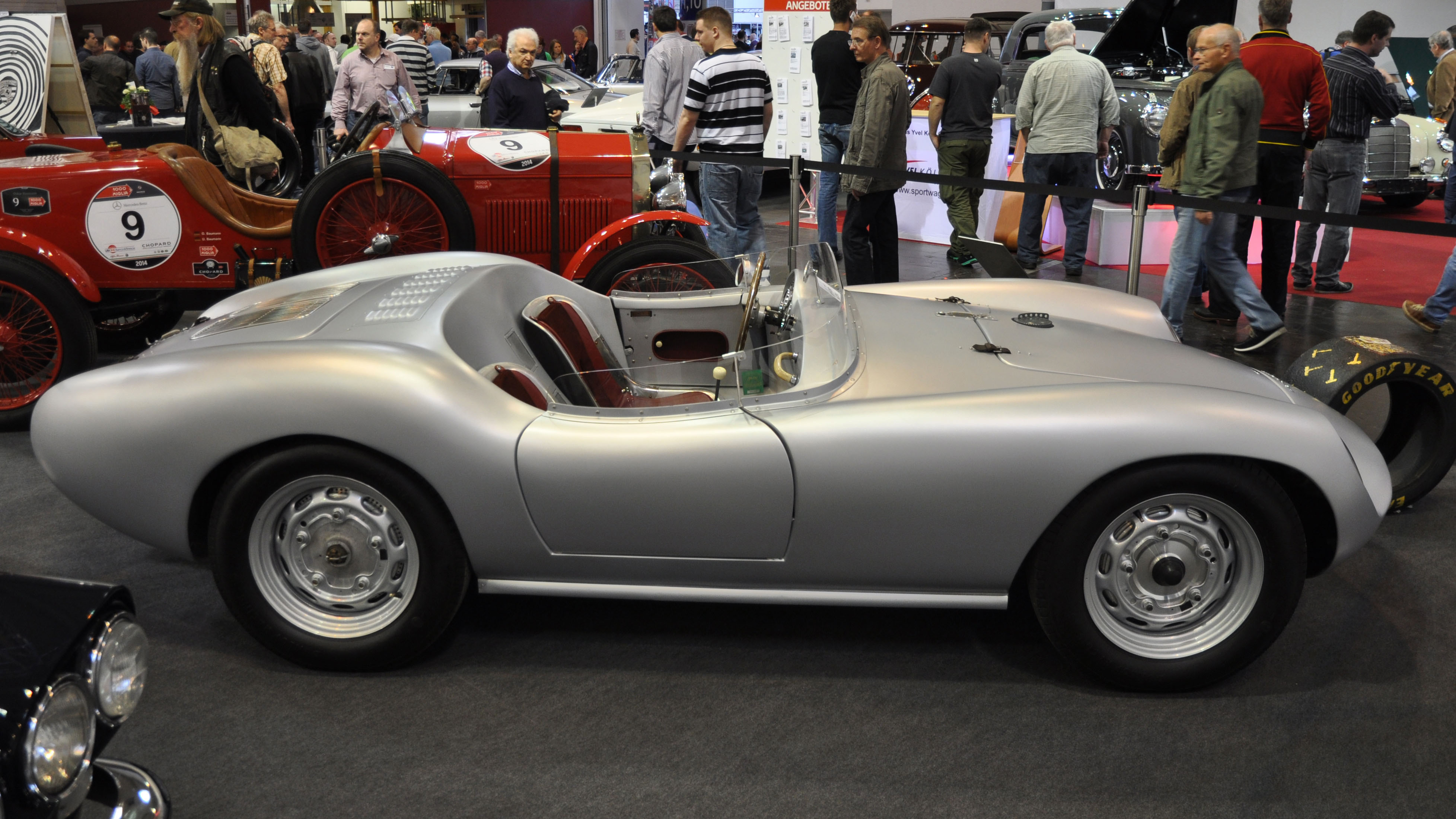
Devin D Porsche (1957)

In 1958 Devin released a new model named the Devin D. This model came with a new body style and was built on a Devin-designed ladder chassis with a wheelbase of 2,083 mm (82 in). The front suspension of transverse torsion bars and trailing links was from Volkswagen, while single coil-over-dampers and trailing arms were used at the rear. The buyer had the choice of rear-mounted air-cooled four-cylinder boxer engines from either Volkswagen or Porsche. The VW engine displaced 1,191 cc (73 cu in) and developed 26.8 kW (36 bhp) at 3700 rpm, while the Porsche engine displaced 1,586 cc (97 cu in) and made 52.2 kW (70 bhp) at 4500 rpm. The Devin D could be bought in kit form, with a basic body-and-frame kit costing US$895.00. A much more complete kit that included a laminated safety glass windshield, folding soft top, side curtains, upholstery and leather-covered bucket seats, chrome bumpers, brake and fuel line, and working head, tail, parking and directional lights was priced at US$1495.00. A turn-key car powered by the VW engine cost US$2950.00, while one with Porsche power was US$3350.00. Production of the Devin D is estimated to have totaled 46 cars.

== Devin C ==
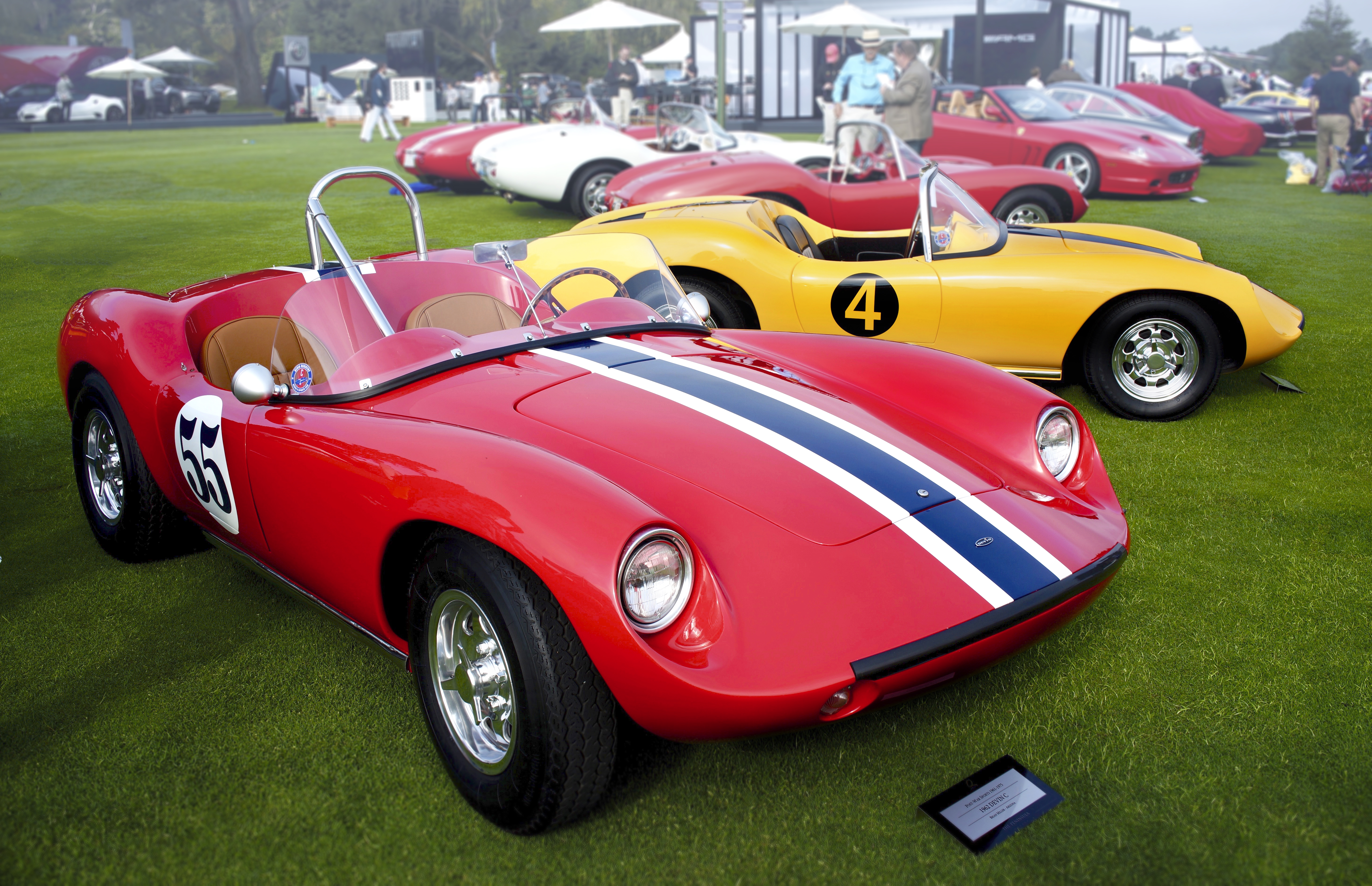
Eight of the original Devin C sports cars were featured at The Quail, A Motorsports Gathering in 2017

In 1959 Devin took the body of the D model and revised the chassis to accept the newly introduced Chevrolet six-cylinder, horizontally opposed, air-cooled engine known as the "Chevrolet Turbo-Air 6 engine" and 4-speed transaxle as used in the Chevrolet Corvair. Rear suspension and brakes from the Corvair were also part of the package. The resulting car was called the Devin C. Like the Devin D, it was offered as a component car in kit form with a painted body already bonded to the frame, laminated windshield, and doors and deck lids already attached or as a completed car built by Devin Enterprises. The Devin C was priced at US$2500.00 in kit form or US$4500.00 for a fully assembled car.

The prototype Devin C weighed just 1,380 lb (626.0 kg) and used a 2,376 cc (145 cu in) displacement engine initially rated at 59.7 kW (80 bhp) at 4400 rpm and 173.5 N⋅m (128 lb⋅ft) at 2300 rpm. Shortly after its introduction to the press, the world-renowned Granatelli Brothers arranged to borrow the only completed Devin C for six weeks. A Paxton centrifugal supercharger was installed with the objective of setting a record at the Bonneville Speed Trials. Bad weather and lack of time prevented an official run but an unofficial top speed of over 165 mph (265.5 km/h) was achieved. The car then made appearances at several Southern California drag strips setting record breaking runs until it was turned away by track owners; few competitors wanted to be embarrassed by the little gold supercharged Devin C.

With the supercharger removed from the engine, racing driver Pete Woods, qualified for the October 1961 L.A. Times-Mirror Grand Prix at Riverside International raceway alongside Jim Hall, Dan Gurney, Stirling Moss, Roger Penske, Bruce McLaren and other international racing champions. The car was a DNF but Woods and Devin weren’t done racing a Devin C.

Subsequent improvements to the Corvair engine by Chevrolet raised output to 90 hp and then 102 hp. In April 1962, Chevrolet introduced a 150 hp turbocharged Spyder engine and made one available to Devin. The second completed Devin C was shown at the New York Auto Show sporting Girling disc brakes on all four wheels. After the show, now owner Pete Woods drove the white car to Colorado where the new factory turbocharged engine was installed. He then drove the car in the 1962 Pikes Peak International Hill Climb, climbing 5,000 feet and covering twelve miles of dirt and gravel road course with a 16:12 elapsed time. Woods then drove the car home to Los Angeles.

Later, cars were constructed with the 164 cu in (2,687 cc) engine in standard form producing 110 hp. Optional engines included the new Corsa 4-carb 140 hp ‘big valve’ engine and the revised Corsa 180 hp turbocharged mill, both displacing 164 cu in. Approximately 25 Devin Cs were built by Devin Enterprises between 1959 and 1965 when production ended.

== The Roosevelt-Devin ==
In 1959 Bill Devin was put in touch with the manager of Franklin D. Roosevelt Jr.'s racing team. The introduction came by way of mutual acquaintance Skip Callanan. The Roosevelt team was interested in having Devin Enterprises rework a Fiat-Abarth into a lighter car with improved braking. They also wanted to have an easy way to change gear-ratios to adapt to different racing courses.

The Fiat frame was abandoned in favor of a new space-frame chassis built by Devin that weighed just 18 kg (40 lb). This frame duplicated the locations of the original unit's suspension mounting points, allowing the original Fiat front and rear suspension to be reused. That suspension was a transverse leaf spring with A-arms and tube-shocks in front and semi-trailing arms with coil springs and tube-shocks in the rear. The stock drum brakes were replaced by 305 mm (12 in) disks made by Cagle. The engine was rotated 180 degrees from its rear-engine location in the original car to a mid-engine layout in the Roosevelt-Devin. The Fiat 600 transaxle also received a set of Harley Klentz Quick Change Gears.

The Fiat body was replaced with a new Devin hard-top unit that also weighed just 18 kg (40 lb). Overall the finished car weighed just 363 kg (800 lb).

== Devin GT ==
In 1963 Bill Devin began construction of the Devin GT Coupe. The Devin GT was the final model developed by Devin Enterprises. This hardtop grand tourer had the same chassis and power-train as the Devin C but came with a significantly revised body shape. The car's bumpers were made of Neoprene and were integrated into the body shape. The new coupe configuration had a fastback roof with full-size doors that extended into the roof, glass side windows, larger headlamps and re-positioned turn indicators. This car was described as a Luxury Sports Car, and the quality of finish and attention to detail were emphasized in the promotional materials along with the leather interior, deep-pile carpets and convenience lighting features. Buyers would have had the ability to customize their car's appearance during construction. The Corvair engine in the GT produced 82 kW (110 hp). Combined with the light weight of the car this resulted in a 0-60 mph time of 5 seconds, a 0-100 mph time of 13 seconds and a top speed of 193 km/h (120 mph). Braking was by drums.

Two cars were planned to be shown at the 1964 New York Auto Show but only one was completed in time. The car was well received and an order was placed for 60 Devin GTs by Imported Cars of Greenwich, Conn. but Devin did not have sufficient financial backing to produce that number of finished cars in the time required by the investor. The financier that helped produce the single show car disappeared with the car. The remaining Devin GT Coupe was finished after Bill's passing in 2000 and was shown at The Quail, A Motorsports Gathering in 2009.

== Car Specifications ==
| | Devin-Panhard | Devin SS | Devin D | Devin C | Roosevelt-Devin |
|---|---|---|---|---|---|
| Year(s) built: | 1954 | 1958-1959 | 1958-1965 | 1959-1965 | 1960 |
| Engine: | 750 cc (45.8 cu in) | 4,637.5 cc (283 cu in) | 1,191 cc (73 cu in) or 1,586 cc (97 cu in) | 1961-1963: 2,369 cc (145 cu in); 1964-1966 2,679 cc (163 cu in) | 747 cc (45.6 cu in) |
| Engine: | Panhard OHV boxer twin. Optional belt-driven single or dual overhead camshaft; optional supercharger | Chevrolet Corvette OHV V8 | Volkswagen OHV Boxer four Porsche OHV boxer four | Chevrolet Corvair OHV boxer six | Abarth Bialbero DOHC four |
| Gearbox: | Panhard four-speed manual | BorgWarner four-speed manual | Volkswagen four-speed manual | Corvair four-speed manual | Fiat 600 four-speed manual |
| Chassis: | ladder | ladder | ladder | ladder | space-frame |
| Front suspension: | Panhard independent with transverse leaf spring | Independent with coil springs | Volkswagen transverse torsion-bar and trailing link | Volkswagen transverse torsion-bar and trailing link | Fiat independent with transverse leaf spring |
| Rear suspension: | Panhard semi-independent with torsion bars | de Dion with coil springs | Swing axle | Chevrolet Corvair Swing axle | Swing axle with coil springs |
| Brakes: | Panhard drums | Girling disc | Volkswagen or Porsche drum | Chevrolet Corvair drum on VW spindles front & Corvair drums rear | Cagle four-wheel disc |
| Weight (approx.): | 431 kg (950 lb) | 984 kg (2,170 lb) | 535 kg (1,180 lb) | 635 kg (1,400 lb) | 363 kg (800 lb) |
| Wheelbase: | 2,134 mm (84 in) | 2,337 mm (92 in) | 2,083 mm (82 in) | 2,083 mm (82 in) | 2,083 mm (82 in) |
| Length: | 3,810 mm (150 in) | 4,166 mm (164 in) | 3,886 mm (153 in) | 3,810 mm (150 in) | |
| Height: | 991 mm (39 in) | 1,118 mm (44 in) | 1,168 mm (46 in) | 1,118 mm (44 in) | 1,118 mm (44 in) |
| Number built: | 6 – 12 | 18 (Irish chassis), <10 (American chassis) | 46 | 25 | 1 |
| Price new: | $2,850.00 | $5,950 (later $10,000) | $2,950 to $3,350, depending on engine selection | $4,500 | |

== Motorsports ==
- In 1956 a Devin-Panhard was the Sports Car Club of America's (SCCA) H-Modified National Champion.
- In 1959 Pete Woods won the C-Modified Championship for the California SCCA club in a Devin SS.
- Between 1959 and 1963 Devin SS cars posted 7 class wins on road race courses.
- Between 1958 and 1963, a variety of Devin Specials posted 8 wins, 6 second-place finishes, and 13 third places with 12 class wins on road race courses.
- In 1964, 1965, and 1966 Joe Lunati’s Chevrolet-powered Devin “Trouble Maker” won the AM/SP gas class title at the NHRA Nationals at Indianapolis Raceway Park, as well as Street Eliminator at Indy in 1964 and 1966.
