= Joe Lunati =

American drag racer and businessman

Joe Lunati was an American drag racer and businessman. He won three National Hot Rod Association (NHRA) national titles and went on to establish the cam-grinding company, Lunati Cams, purchased by Holly Performance Holley in the mid 1990's. Lunati Cams (now Lunati Power) was sold in late 2007 to an exclusive ownership group made up of industry and racing veterans. In 2008 Lunati Power was acquired by Edelbrock.

== History ==
Driving a Chevrolet-powered Devin named Trouble Maker, Lunati won three NHRA national AM/SP gasser titles.

Lunati won his first at the 1964 NHRA Nationals, held at Indianapolis Raceway Park, with a pass of 10.62 seconds at 132.93 mph (213.93 km/h). He also took Street Eliminator at the event.

In 1965, Lunati again took the AM/SP national title, with a win at the NHRA Nationals, held at Indianapolis. His winning pass was 10.33 seconds at 138.24 mph (222.48 km/h).

Lunati won a third AM/SP title at Indy in 1966, with a pass of 10.31 seconds at 139.96 mph (225.24 km/h). He was also Street Eliminator winner there that year.

Lunati's Camaro, The Dixie Devil, went to the final of Funny Car Eliminator at Indianapolis in 1967 (the first time the class was run there), where Lunati lost to Doug Thorley'ss "Doug's Headers" Corvair. (The Camaro was wrecked a short time later. )

Lunati also formed the cam-grinding company, Lunati Cams, purchased by Holly Performance Holley in the mid 1990's. Lunati Cams, now Lunati Power, was sold again in late 2007 to an exclusive ownership group made up of industry and racing veterans.

== Sources ==
- Davis, Larry. Gasser Wars, North Branch, MN: Cartech, 2003, pp.184-5.
