= Jim Parsons (drag racer) =

American gasser drag racer

Jim Parsons is an American gasser drag racer.

Parsons drove a 1927 Ford dubbed The High and Mighty; in 1963, it was powered by a Dodge V8, in 1966 by a Chrysler.

Parsons won the NHRA A/SR (A Street) national title twice, in 1963 and 1966.

Parsons won at the 1963 NHRA Nationals, held at Indianapolis Raceway Park, with a pass of 12.17 seconds at 121.13 mph (194.94 km/h).

In 1966, Parsons won at the 1966 NHRA Nationals, again at Indianapolis, with a pass of 10.16 seconds at 138.46 mph (222.83 km/h).

== Sources ==
- Davis, Larry. Gasser Wars, North Branch, MN: Cartech, 2003, pp. 180–8.
