= Big John Mazmanian =

American racing driver (1926–2006)

John Mazmanian
- Nationality: American
- Born: May 18, 1926 East Los Angeles, California, U.S.
- Died: July 21, 2006 (aged 80) California, U.S.
- Retired: 1972

Funny Car
- Years active: late 1950s? - 1972

Awards
- 1998: NHRA Hall of Fame

John Mazmanian (May 18, 1926 – July 21, 2006), also known as Big John Mazmanian, was an Armenian-American NHRA drag racer.

== Biography ==
In the 1960s and 1970s, Mazmanian became a well-known name in Southland racing circles, largely due to his promotions for gasser and funny car competitions at local drag strips every weekend.

In "Billy the Mountain," a song rich with inside jokes about Southern California, Frank Zappa and the Mothers of Invention mention a Mazmanian funny car competition held at the Irwindale Speedway.

Standing at 6 feet 5 inches, Mazmanian loomed over many of his fellow owners. Born in East Los Angeles, he excelled in football at Garfield High School. After the attack on Pearl Harbor, he enlisted in the Navy and served in the Pacific, where he sustained shrapnel wounds during the battle for Leyte Gulf.

Mazmanian began his journey in car building before he was even old enough to drive, reconstructing a 1932 Ford into a “highboy roadster” for an auto shop class when he was just 14. Before long, he was building and customizing other cars, painting them his signature candy apple red and racing them at tracks across the country. He began with "gassers," modified street-legal cars powered by gasoline. During this time, he transformed standard stock model Corvettes and Willys. One of his most famous cars from this era was a 1941 Willys equipped with a Chrysler Hemi engine.

In 1967, late-model cars were introduced into the Gasser ranks for the first time. Stone-Woods-Cook had already exited the class, and Mazmanian recognized the trend. The following year, he transitioned to Funny Cars, and before long, Gassers had completely vanished from the scene.

Mazmanian advanced to funny cars, high-powered vehicles fueled by a potent blend that includes nitromethane, producing a massive cloud of burnt rubber smoke from their large back tires at the start of a drag race. His cars were driven by notable figures in the sport, including Mike Snively and Danny Ongais.
