= Doug Cook =

American drag racer

Doug “Cookie" Cook (July 27, 1932 – June 16, 1999) was an American drag racer.

Cook started in gassers, with a win in C/G at Detroit Dragway in Detroit, Michigan, in 1959. Driving a small-block V8-powered 1937 Chevrolet, he recorded a pass of 13.17 seconds at 105.88 mph (170.40 km/h).

Cook took a win in C/GS at Detroit Dragway in 1960, in a Chevrolet-powered 1941 Willys gasser. He recorded a pass of 12.89 seconds at 119.36 mph (192.09 km/h). Because this was a C/GS class win, this was not, strictly, a repeat win.

In 1962, driving the Oldsmobile-powered Stone-Woods-Cook 1941 Willys gasser, Cook won A/GS at the NHRA Nationals at Indianapolis Raceway Park in Indianapolis, Indiana. He recorded a pass of 10.59 seconds at 136.77 mph (220.11 km/h).

At the 1965 NHRA Nationals, held at Indianapolis Raceway Park, 1941 Willyses driven by Cook (the Stone-Woods-Cook gasser Stone-Woods-Cook gasser, sponsored by Isky Cams, now powered by a Chrysler hemi) and Dick Bourgeois (owned by "Big John" Mazmanian, sponsored by Engle Cams) faced off in A/GS. Cook took the win with a slow pass of 14.20 seconds at 116.53 mph (187.54 km/h).

Fred Stone, Leonard Woods Jr. and Cook had a car Cook drove to over 400 drag race victories in the 1960s. Cook was Caucasian, Stone and Woods were African-American; their partnership is considered the first competitive multiracial team in drag racing.

Cook also drove the Stone-Woods-Cook AA/GS 1966 Mustang Dark Horse Too.

Stone-Woods-Cook abandoned A/GS for Top Fuel Funny Car by the start of the 1967 season.

== Sources ==
- Taylor, Thom. "Gone Gassers" in Hot Rod, March 2017, p. 9.
- Davis, Larry. Gasser Wars, North Branch, MN: Cartech, 2003, pp. 181, 182, 184, & 187.
- CompetitionPlus, Drag Racing's Internet Magazine
