= Detroit Dragway =

Raceway

Coordinates: 42°09′46″N 83°14′04″W

Detroit Dragway was a quarter mile long drag strip located in Brownstown Charter Township, Michigan on the corner of Sibley and Dix. It opened in 1959 by Gil Kohn and the track became sanctioned by the National Hot Rod Association in 1959. The "Dirty D" as it was also known was the host of the 1959 and 1960 NHRA U.S. Nationals.

== History ==
The track opened in 1959 and closed in fall of 1998. In 1959 and 1960 the track hosted the U.S. Nationals. The U.S. Nationals were moved to Lucas Oil Raceway at Indianapolis in 1961. The national event is still held there today. Gil Kohn was the owner of Detroit Dragway. Gil Kohn and promoter Ben Christ came up with the radio commercial "Sunday! Sunday! Sunday!" . This ad is used to promote events to this day. The Summer Nationals of 1978 set the largest amount in prize money ever awarded at the track of $40,000. A typical weekend crowd was around 30,000 spectators. The track went downhill starting in the 1980s. In 1991 the weekend spectator turnout was around 500. The track was to be renovated with a multimillion-dollar deal in 1994. Local politics never gave the track a chance to do so due to numerous complaints from residents in the subdivisions that were built ever-closer to the track. The last year for the track was 1998.

== Legends of Detroit ==
Shirley Muldowney was known as the "first lady" of drag racing. Shirley at age 16 never even knew how to drive a car. At age 18 she had learned how to drive from her husband, Jack Muldowney, and then appeared in her very first race in 1958. Muldowney got her NHRA license in 1965. Muldowney made a change in classes she ran and jumped from dragsters to funny cars. She purchased her funny car from the legendary Connie Kalitta. From 1972 to 1977, Muldowney teamed up with Connie Kalitta. She made it to Top Fuel class getting her license in 1973 and winning three national championships in 1977, 1980 and 1982.

Connie Kalitta was nicknamed the "Bounty Hunter". National Hot Rod Association Top 50 Drivers list Connie "The Bounty Hunter" Kalitta was ranked #21. Kalitta won 10 NHRA national events. Kalitta appeared in 22 finals. Kalitta recorded a personal best pass of 4.58 @ 314 mph in 1999. Kalitta no longer drives, but is still very much involved in running Kalitta Motorsports which is based out of Ypsilanti, Michigan.
