= The Wally =

Trophy given to winners of NHRA events

The Wally is the trophy awarded to winners of an NHRA national event. They have been handed out at national events starting with the 1969 NHRA race season. With an antique brass plating over a standard metal mix and a solid walnut base, the "Wally" (named after NHRA founder Wally Parks) is 18 inches tall and weighs 12 pounds. Contrary to popular belief, the Wally trophy does not feature Parks himself, but is rather modeled after Top Gas racer Jack Jones. According to the June 30, 1995 edition of National Dragster, in early 1969 Jack Jones was at his day job, and got a call from Wally Parks. Parks asked him if he would be willing to pose for pictures for a trophy at Pomona Raceway. Pomona is a 16-minute ride from Glendora where the NHRA is based. Jack agreed and a number of pictures were snapped, including the now iconic photo of him with his safety equipment and a tire. Later that year, the famous Wally trophy was introduced. It is the same design as in 1969.

== Background ==
The NHRA was formed by Wally Parks in 1951 in an effort to promote the sport of drag racing while keeping young people from racing on local roads. The first national event was held in 1955 in Great Bend, Kansas on an abandoned air strip. The first national event winner in the NHRA was 25-year-old Calvin Rice of Santa Ana, CA.

In the June 30, 1995 issue of National Dragster, Jack Jones said, "Believe it or not, Wally Parks called me at my job and asked if I'd do him a favor, pose for pictures that would be used as models for the trophy." The Wally was modeled after the images taken of Jones during a photo shoot at Pomona Raceway in California in 1969.

== Variations ==
Variations of the Wally exist for other special purposes. Some of which include the NHRA Lucas Oil Drag Racing Series Wally, a scaled-down replica of the national event Wally. The NHRA National Dragster Challenge Wally, awarded to NHRA Summit Series E.T. Bracket racers, is the same size as the Lucas Oil Drag Racing Series Wally but with a pewter finish. Beginning in 1994, a full scale Wally with a square base was first awarded to NHRA Junior Drag Racing League national champions. A variety of special awards including plaques and glass etched trophies integrate the image of the Wally.

== Most victories ==
The table below outlines the drivers with the most NHRA national event victories in professional and sportsman categories. (As of Sept 14, 2020)

Driver	National Event Wins
John Force	151
Frank Manzo*	105
Dan Fletcher	104
David Rampy	100
Warren Johnson	97
Greg Anderson	100
Bob Glidden*	85
Tony Schumacher	84
Jeg Coughlin Jr.	84
Pat Austin*	75
Kenny Bernstein*	69
Antron Brown	66
Ron Capps	65
Larry Dixon	62
Joe Amato*	57
Andrew Hines	56
Jason Line	53
Peter Biondo	52
Robert Hight	51
Bob Newberry*	50
Don Prudhomme*	49
Edmond Richardson	48
Jeff Taylor	48
Doug Kalitta	48
Eddie Krawiec	47
Dave Schultz*	45
Gary Scelzi*	43
Tony Pedregon*	43

* Denotes retired or inactive drivers
