= 1978 NHRA Summernationals =

National Hot Rod Association
- Location: Englishtown, New Jersey
- Corporate sponsor: Winston

The 1978 NHRA Summernationals (commonly known as the Summernats) were a National Hot Rod Association (NHRA) drag racing event, held at Englishtown, New Jersey, on 16 July.

Sponsored by Winston, it was attended by top dragster drivers Don Prudhomme, Shirley Muldowney, reigning Top Fuel Dragster (TF/D) champion Dick Tharp (with the Candies and Hughes fueller), as well as funny car drivers, including Frank “Ace” Manzo (with a Monza BB/FC), Tom Prock (with the Detroit Tiger AA/FC), "TV Tommy" Ivo (the Rod Shop Dodge AA/FC), and R. C. Sherman (the Black Magic AA/FC), as well as Pro Stock champions including Grumpy Jenkins (with the Grumpy's Toy Monza). (Note: No Top Fuel Funny Cars were recorded by National Dragster photographers.) Gordie Bonin drove the Bubble Up Pontiac Trans Am funny car, while Kenny Bernstein appeared in the Chelsea King funny car. Bob Glidden took Pro Stock in his Ford Fairmont. Denny Savage claimed the TF/FC title that year, with Ed "The Ace" McCulloch runner-up.
