= Kurt Johnson =

American racing driver

Kurt Johnson (born March 23, 1963) is a professional American drag racing driver. He was born in Virginia, Minnesota, and currently resides in Buford, Georgia. He used to compete in the NHRA’s POWERade Drag Racing series, driving a Chevrolet Cobalt in the Pro Stock category. His primary sponsor was ACDelco, whom he drove for since 1996.

== Early career ==
Born in Virginia, Minnesota, Johnson was immersed in his father's (Hall of Fame Pro Stock racer Warren Johnson) racing efforts from the start. He traveled with his family to races around the country, and started by odd jobs with the three-person crew (including his father and mother Arlene), beginning with sweeping floors at the shop. It was through these jobs that Johnson learned the business. According to Johnson, he was “never pushed to stay involved,” but got “hooked” on racing. With each passing season, Johnson's responsibilities grew from cleaning parts and loading the trailer to assisting with tuning decisions, until soon he was assembling the 500 cubic-inch engines that would power his father to many wins and six championships. Johnson would eventually become his father's crew chief, guiding the family's second team to top-five points finishes in 1991 and 1992.

== Racing career ==
Originally sent by Warren to Roy Hill’s racing school to improve the dialogue between driver and crew chief, the move led Johnson to consider getting behind the wheel. He made his competitive driving debut in a Pro Stock Oldsmobile Cutlass at the 1993 NHRA Winternationals in Pomona, CA, qualifying fifteenth, and won two rounds before being narrowly defeated by former teammate Scott Geoffrion in the semi-finals. Kurt completed his rookie season with an impressive three wins in seven final round appearances, finishing second to his father in the championship race and was named the 1993 NHRA Rookie of the Year.

On May 20, 1994, Johnson earned a permanent place in NHRA history by recording the first Pro Stock six-second pass, with his 6.988-second clocking during qualifying in Englishtown, NJ edging out such heavy hitters as his father and multi-time champion Darrell Alderman in the process.

In 1996, Johnson joined forces with sponsor ACDelco.

Jonhson's success continued over the next years, with consecutive titles at the prestigious U.S. Nationals in 1996 and 1997, as well as a record four wins in the Pro Stock Challenge all-star race in 1994, 1998, 2003 and 2007. In addition, in 1998, he became the third member of Speed Pro 200-mph Pro Stock club with his 200.13 mph run in Gainesville, FL.

Johnson has also continually shown his prowess as a driver. For example, en route to winning the 2005 ACDelco Las Vegas Nationals in Las Vegas, Nevada, Johnson not only set low elapsed time and top speed of the event, but also used a .002 reaction to eliminate arch-rival Greg Anderson on a 6.839 – 6.821-second holeshot, his second such win of the day.

Since 2005, Johnson has logged four additional wins, including the SummitRacing.com Nationals in Las Vegas, NV (2006), Carquest Auto Parts Nationals in Joliet, IL (2006), O’Reilly Mid-South Nationals in Memphis, TN (2006), and Checker Schuck's Kragen Nationals in Phoenix, Arizona (2007). These wins extended Johnson's fourteen-year streak of winning at least one race a year, which is the second longest streak among all NHRA professional categories. Johnson has also finished in the top-ten in the championship standings in each of his first fourteen seasons on the NHRA circuit, including four runner-up finishes in 1993, 2000, 2003 and 2005.

Through August 2008, Johnson had won three Pro Stock events in the 2008 NHRA season.

== Personal life ==
Away from the track, Johnson enjoys spending time with his wife Kathy and their three children, Conner, Erin and Jarrett at their home in Buford, Georgia. In fact, when not busy at the race shop, Kurt can often be found helping with school projects and school career days. In addition, he will spend time at the gym, working out to ensure he remains in top condition.

Johnson's father, Warren, is also an accomplished drag racer in the NHRA's Pro Stock division. In the 1993 NHRA season Kurt finished second to his father in the championship race, which was the first 1-2 father-son finish in NHRA history, as well as recording the first father-son final round pairing at the 1993 Atlanta event.

== Career highlights ==
First Pro Stock driver in NHRA history to run a 6-second elapsed time (6.988 seconds, Englishtown, N.J. on May 20, 1994); first member of Holley 6-Second Pro Stock Club.

1993 NHRA Rookie of the Year (won three events and finished second to his father, Warren, in championship)

39 NHRA national event victories (fifth among Pro Stock drivers)

66 final-round appearances (35 wins and 30 runners-up)

Third Member of Speed-Pro 200 mph Pro Stock Club (ran 200.13 mph on March 14, 1998)

27 career No. 1 qualifiers

Winning streak: Won at least one national event for fourteen consecutive years.

Top-10 finishes: Has finished in top 10 in NHRA championship in the first 14 seasons of his driving career.

Four-time runner-up in NHRA championship (1993, 2000, 2003, 2005)

Rounds won: 447 round wins, 251 losses through 3/1/07 (698 total rounds, 64% winning average)
