= 1978 NHRA Winternationals =

The 1978 NHRA Winternationals (commonly known as the Winternats) were a National Hot Rod Association (NHRA) drag racing event, held at Auto Club Raceway in Pomona, California, on 5 February; rain halted eliminations after round one was complete. Racing resumed on 13 February, only to have an unusual snow storm interrupt again; the final was held on 14 February.

== Top Fuel Dragster ==
The Top Fuel Dragster field was 16 cars.

=== Round one ===
Top qualifier, and 1973 and 1975 winner, Don Garlits (in Swamp Rat XXIV, lost to #9 qualifier Richard Tharp. #3 qualifier Pat Dakin was defeated by #11 qualifier Rob Bruins. Shirley Muldowney qualified #6, and eliminated #14 qualifier Larry Sutton. #8 qualifier Terry Capp lost to low qualifier Rick Ramsey. John Kimble, who qualified #12, was defeated by #4 qualifier John Abbott. Gary Beck qualified #7 and fell to Dick LaHaie, who qualified #15. !3 qualifier Marvin Graham lost to #5 qualifier Gordon Fabeck. #2 qualifier Kelly Brown defeated #10 qualifier Jeb Allen.

=== Round two ===
Abbott lost to Ramsey, Tharp to Fabeck, Muldowney to Brown, and Bruins to LaHaie.

=== Semi-final round ===
Fabeck eliminated LaHaie and Brown defeated Ramsey.

=== Final round ===
Brown defeated Fabeck, earning a US$12,000 prize.

== Top Fuel Funny Car ==
The Top Fuel Funny Car field was 16 cars; Billy Meyer and Jake Crimmins attended, but failed to qualify.

=== Round one ===
Top qualifier Tripp Shumake, in the 1978 Plymouth Arrow, was defeated by Gary Burgin's 1978 Chevrolet Monza. Reigning 3-time winner Don "The Snake" Prudhomme's 1978 Arrow qualified #3, and eliminated #11 qualifier Ed "The Ace" McCulloch's 1978 Arrow. "TV Tommy" Ivo qualified #2 in a 1978 Arrow, defeating Dave Hough's #10-qualifying 1978 Arrow. Ron Colson, qualified #12 in the 1978 Chevrolet Monza, was defeated by #4 qualifier Gordon Bonin's 1978 Pontiac Trans Am. #14 qualifier John Collins, in a 1977 Plymouth Duster, fell to the 1977 Chevrolet Camaro of Denny Savage. Dave Condit, who qualified #13 in a 1978 Arrow, lost to Tom "Mongoo$e" McEwen's #5-qualifying 1977 Chevrolet Corvette. Pat Foster qualified #7 in a 1978 Trans Am, and was eliminated by #15 qualifier Gene Snow's 1977 Arrow. Low qualifier Ezra Boggs (in the 1977 Chevrolet Corvette) lost to #8 qualifier, a 1978 Chevrolet Monza driven by Tom Prock (whose son Jimmy later became an NHRA mechanic and grandson Austin is a 2019 NHRA Top Fuel driver).

=== Round two ===
Burgin, in the Monza, lost to McEwen. Bonin was defeated by Prock. Snow was eliminated by Prudhomme. Savge lost to Ivo.

=== Semi-final round ===
McEwen faced Prudhomme, who advanced. Ivo defeated Prock.

=== Final round ===
Prudhomme took a fourth straight Funny Car win at Pomona.

== Pro Stock ==
The Pro Stock field was 16 cars. Don Campanello qualified #7, but failed to make the start for round one; his place was taken by #17 qualifier Gary Hansen.

=== Round one ===
Top qualifier Bob Glidden, in a 1978 Ford Pinto, eliminated #9 qualifier Lee Hunter's 1977 Ford Mustang. Jean Batteux qualified #13 in a 1977 Pinto, and was defeated by #5 qualifier Kevin Rotty's 1974 Camaro. #2 qualifier Warren Johnson's Camaro was eliminated by the AMC of #10 qualifier Wally Booth. #16 qualifier Brad Yuill's Monza lost to the Camaro of #8 qualifier Mark Yuill. Larry Lombardo, qualified #12 in a 1978 Monza, defeated Sonny Bryant, who qualified #4 in a 1977 Camaro. #3 qualifier Frank Iaconio's Monza defeated the 1976 Duster of #11 qualifier Randy Humphrey. John Hagen qualified #14 in a 1978 Arrow, and was eliminated by Gordie Rivera's Monza. Low qualifier Hansen's 1975 Chevrolet Vega was eliminated by the #15-qualified 1977 Camaro of Tom Chelbana.

=== Round two ===
Rotty lost to Glidden, Booth to Rivera, Yuill to Lombardo, and Chelbana to Iaconio.

=== Semi-final round ===
Yuill was eliminated by Lombardo, Iaconio by Gildden.

=== Final round ===
Glidden took the win over Iaconio.
