= Scott Geoffrion =

American NHRA drag racing driver (1965-2006)

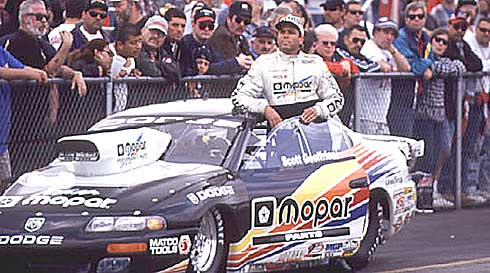
- Geoffrion as one of "The Dodge Boys"
- Nationality: American
- Born: May 18, 1965 South Yarmouth, Massachusetts, U.S.
- Died: May 8, 2006 (aged 40) Irvine, California, U.S.

Pro Stock
- Years active: 1987 - 2004
- Teams: Team Mopar/Dodge Boys, Nitro Fish
- Best finish: 2nd (2 times) in 1992, 1994

Scott Geoffrion (May 18, 1965 – May 8, 2006) was an American NHRA drag racing driver. He was a former two-time Pro Stock World Championship runner-up and a nine-time national event winner. He died on May 8, 2006, of an apparent heart attack in Irvine, California. Geoffrion reached the final round 28 times in his career that spanned more than 200 races from 1987 through 2004. He didn't score his first victory until his tenth final round, in Memphis in 1993, where he defeated Pro Stock legend Bob Glidden.

ESPN's obituary listed him as "a character, a charmer, and a drag racer who wanted to enjoy himself as much as he wanted to win."

== Career ==
In 1987, Geoffrion began his Pro Stock career as a team driver for Warren Johnson. Still, it wasn't long before Geoffrion's talents were recognized and he was offered a factory car alongside Darrell Alderman.

Throughout the early 1990s, Geoffrion and his Team Mopar teammate, Darrell Alderman, generated an aura throughout the sport. Alderman and Geoffrion became known as "The Dodge Boys" and Mopar's Pro Stock hinged on that brand for the next several years. During that time, Alderman added two more championships to his 1991 title while Geoffrion provided Mopar with a formidable 1-2 punch that resulted in his two runner-up points finishes in 1992 and 1994 (career-high six wins). Geoffrion logged a career six top-ten finishes.

The two racers gave Mopar a 'hip, youthful image' that complemented the company's performance marketing strategies. Geoffrion and Alderman could be talking to fans, signing autographs, and amplifying their "Butch and Sundance" personas with fan-friendly humor. It was a high-water mark.

Geoffrion sat out the 2001 season after being released from the Dodge camp following three lackluster seasons. However, he resurfaced in a Ford with new team owner Hurley Blakeney of Nitro Fish Racing; he scored his final top 10 finish in 2003, a season in which he was runner-up twice.

Geoffrion was the Vice-President for National Electronic Alloys, Inc. of Santa Ana, California, up until his death at the age of 40.

== Records ==
In September 1992, Geoffrion became the first NHRA Pro Stock competitor to break the 7.10 second mark when he completed a 7.099-second pass at Maple Grove Raceway in Mohnton, Pennsylvania. On October 7, 2000, Geoffrion set an NHRA Pro Stock record in his B1 wedge-powered Dodge R/T. He passed through the Memphis Motorsports Park timing lights at a record-shattering 6.809-second elapsed time during qualifying for the 13th annual AutoZone Nationals. The following day he officially backed up the national record with a run of 6.868 secs. in his first-round victory over teammate Darrell Alderman The historic pass eclipsed Warren Johnson's 6.822-second effort set Oct. 23, 1999 at the Texas Motorplex in Ennis.
