= Dave Strickler (drag racer) =

American drag racer

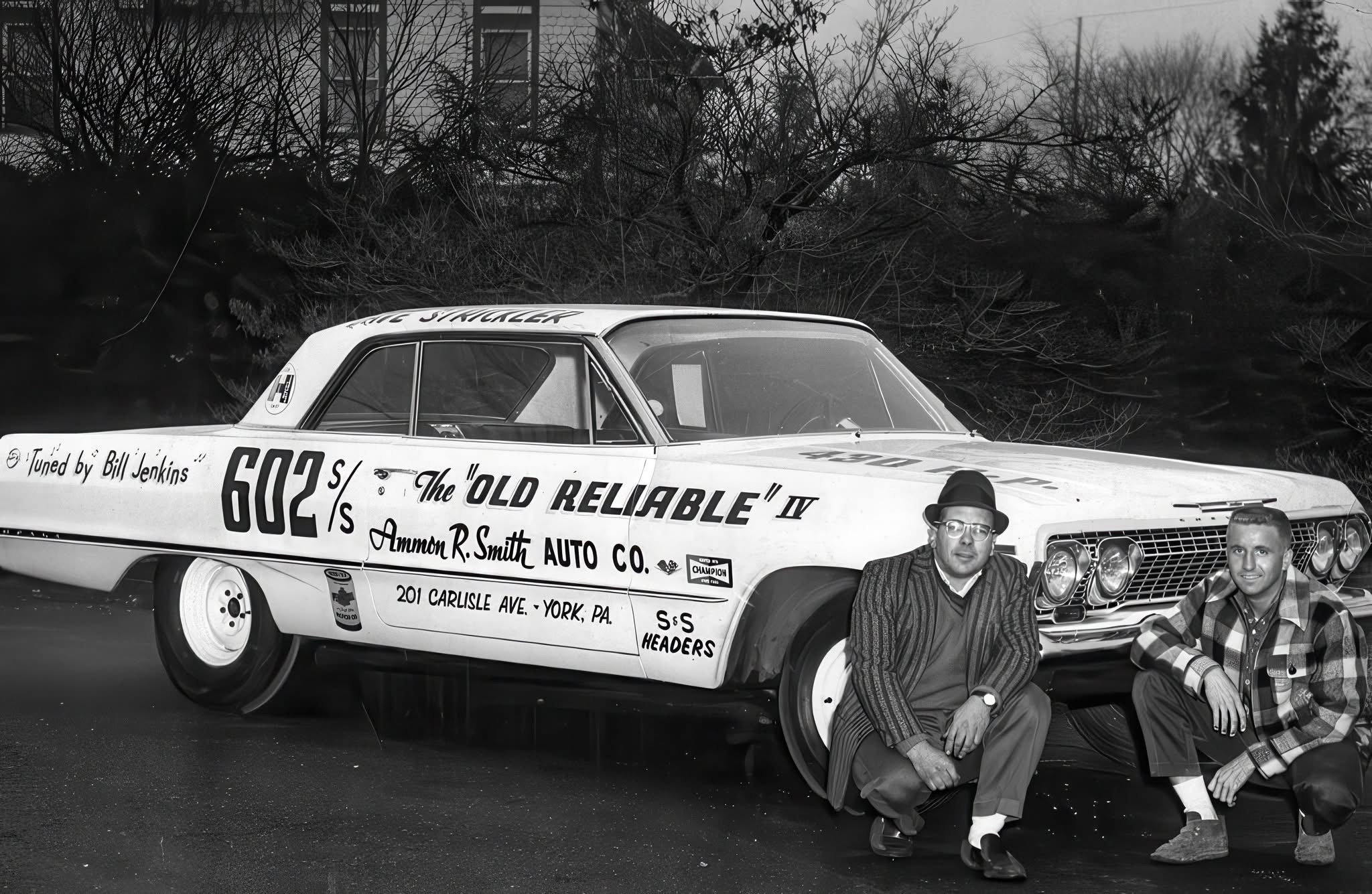
Bill ‘Grumpy’ Jenkins (L) and Dave ‘Strick’ Strickler (R) posing in front of their winning Impala Z11.

Dave Strickler was an American drag racer during the 1960s.

Nicknamed 'Strick', his best friend, Martin Strand, taught him how to drive.

'Strick' rapidly proved himself to be a master of the Stickshift and 'power shifting'. He rapidly became regarded as the equal of the best in the game, including Ronnie Sox, Tommy Grove and Don Nicholson.

At the 1962 NHRA Winternationals at Pomona (A meet made famous by Carol Cox), Strickler, driving the Ammon Smith-owned Chevrolet, lost to "Dyno Don" Nicholson in Stock Eliminator,Nicholson raced his B/FX Chevy wagon named 'Ugly Duckling' and Strickler raced his Super Super/Stock Chevy 409cid/400hp car.

At 1963's U.S. Nationals at Indianapolis Raceway Park, Strickler racing an A/FX (Factory Experimental) Z11 Chevrolet Impala claimed Little Eliminator with a win over Jim Wangers driving a ‘Swiss Cheese 421cid Pontiac Catalina, To get there, he defeated Tommy Grove in a 63 Plymouth Maxwedge for the A/FX trophy.

In the early days, Strickler's engine builder was Bill "Grumpy" Jenkins, who was establishing a reputation as a driver and engine builder/tuner.

Strickler teamed with Bill Jenkins under a Chrysler racing contract for 1964. The team was named the Original Dodge Boys and Strick’s lightning reflexes combined with the might of the newly reased A864 Race Hemi, made for a deadly pairing. Strick won A/FX over Tommy Grove's Plymouth Melrose Missile, running the qtr mile in 11.4 seconds.

Strickler visited Beeline Dragway in 1964, taking Top Stock at the AHRA Winter Nationals in a 1964 Dodge,

Driving a 2 July 1965 match race at Charlotte Motor Speedway, in a 1965 Plymouth owned by Ronnie Sox, Strickler beat the Petty Enterprises #43Jr. 1965 Plymouth Barracuda of Richard Petty, in his brief foray into drag racing.

For whatever reason, Strickler's career fell out of the limelight, in 66, however he continued as a 'hired gun', racing for teams as prestigious as Sox & Martin.

Strickler's career highlight was the 1968 World Finals, where he beat his old team-mate Bill Jenkins for the World Championship title.

Strickler raced a SS/F class Z28 Camaro, while Jenkins steered his SS/D Chevy II. While Strick's Elapsed Time was slower -(11.89 to 11.48) - his handicap saw him cross the tape first.

He continued to race Chevrolet Camaros tuned by Jenkins through 1969, however they were slowly becoming less competitive against the Chrysler Hemi - there was now a .5 second difference between Ronnie Sox's car and the fastest car Chevrolet had for sale - although neither were in any way 'stock' cars.

Strickler went to the 1970 NHRA World Finals at Dallas International Motor Speedway, where he was eliminated in round two by eventual Pro Stock winner Ronnie Sox.

Some of Strickler's early cars were known as Old Reliable.

For the 1971 NHRA Winternationals, Strickler qualified #20, but did not race.

Strickler died in 1985.
