= Grumpy's Toys =

2011 biography by Doug Boyce

Grumpy's Toys: The Authorized History of Grumpy Jenkins' Cars
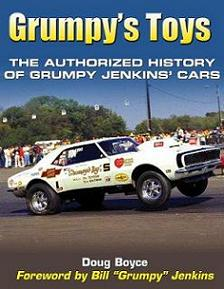
- Author: Doug Boyce
- Cover artist: Ray Mann
- Language: English
- Genre: Biography
- Publisher: CarTech Books
- Publication date: January 15, 2011
- Publication place: Canada, United States
- Media type: Print (Paperback)
- Pages: 176 pages
- ISBN: 978-1-934709-27-6

Grumpy's Toys: The Authorized History of Grumpy Jenkins' Cars is an authorized biography of drag racing legend Bill "Grumpy" Jenkins, with Jenkins himself writing the book's foreword.

The book was written by author Doug Boyce, who has also written the book Junior Stock: Drag Racing the Family Sedan.

== Overview ==
Few men have impacted the sport of drag racing like Jenkins. His storied drag racing career began in the late 1950s and continued right up until his death in March 2012. Throughout his career, both innovation and success followed him closely. This book documents the long and colorful history of the 17 competition cars that proudly bore the name, Grumpy's Toy.

Grumpy's Toys stands as a full and complete history of Jenkins' career as told through his cars and has been heartily authorized by the man himself (Jenkins wrote the book's foreword.) Input from Grumpy punctuates the tales behind the now-legendary cars. Many myths about both Jenkins and his formidable racing cars have grown over the decades, and Jenkins himself helps to separate the fact from the fiction.

Jenkins' initial claim to fame would be his tune up service that would, in 1961 lead into a partnership with Dave Strickler, which lasted through 1964. All of Strickler's Old Reliable cars are discussed here with supporting tales from Bill himself and photos from the collection of the Strickler family. This book takes you through the Dodge Boys cars, the break up of Strickler and Jenkins, and also looks at the Black Arrow Plymouth that followed. Black Arrow would bring Jenkins his first NHRA Championship in 1965, his only non-Chevrolet national event win. Read how Jenkins had hoped to obtain a Chrysler deal of his own and why the attempt failed. The Black Arrow controversy is finally put to rest with the help of reclusive Doc Burgess. The Chevy IIs, the factory supplied Camaros, Vegas and Monzas are all discussed in proceeding chapters.

The book does get into factory ties and Jenkins' relationship with the likes of Vince Piggins, Paul Prior and Ron Sperry. Chevrolets supply of cars and parts would start in 1966 when Vince Piggins came knocking on the door.

National events are covered throughout with an appendix dedicated to Grumpy's Toys national event wins and runners-up along with a complete list of winning customer cars that were prepared by Jenkins Competition.

Contributors included the likes of Jere Stahl, Mike Strickler, Bud Faubel, Pete Preston, Doc Burgess, Bruce Tucker, Pete Hutchinson, Derrick Von Bargen, Ed Quay, Ken Dondero, Steve Johns, Joe Lepone Jr, Darwin Doll, John Jadauga etc., etc. Jenkins was on board from the get go and tales of his "trip" help make this book a memorial read.

The book does open with an informative look at Jenkins' early up bringing and early interests in life. The closing chapter takes a look at what Bill has been up to since the sell of the last Grumpys Toy at the end of 1983. The old saying goes that idle hands are the devils tool, well with no car to maintain, Bill would find other ways to keep plenty busy. Extensive work for Chevrolet would fill his time along with reverting to building engines for customers. Winners in Pro Stock, Pro Stock Truck, Comp Eliminator would follow and are all touched on in the closing chapter, Beyond the Toys.

Over 300 photos help tell the story of Jenkins' career, approximately 95% of which have never seen print. Included are images from Bill's personal collection. Thanks to Pete Hutchinson of the now defunct SRD Racecars, readers for the first time can view build photos of the first tube chassis Pro Stocker.

== Slideshow ==
A promotional video was made for Grumpy's Toys prior to its release date, featuring a slideshow of Bill Jenkins and his many toys. Set to the instrumental song Rise by Herb Alpert, the video garnered rave reviews and contributed to the book's success.
