= 1978 in motorsport =

The following is an overview of the events of 1978 in motorsport including the major racing events, motorsport venues that were opened and closed during a year, championships and non-championship events that were established and disestablished in a year, and births and deaths of racing drivers and other motorsport people.

== Annual events ==
The calendar includes only annual major non-championship events or annual events that had significance separate from the championship. For the dates of the championship events see related season articles.

Date	Event	Ref
4–5 February	16th 24 Hours of Daytona	
12 February	1978 NHRA Winternationals	
19 February	20th Daytona 500	
7 May	36th Monaco Grand Prix	
28 May	62nd Indianapolis 500	
1–9 June	60th Isle of Man TT	
10–11 June	46th 24 Hours of Le Mans	
16 July	1978 NHRA Summernationals	
22–23 July	30th 24 Hours of Spa	
30 July	1st Suzuka 8 Hours	
1 October	19th Hardie-Ferodo 1000	
7–8 October	7th 24 Hours of Nurburgring	
19 November	25th Macau Grand Prix	

== Births ==
Date	Month	Name	Nationality	Occupation	Note	Ref
22	June	Dan Wheldon	British	Racing driver	Indianapolis 500 winner (2005, 2011).	
14	July	Mattias Ekström	Swedish	Racing driver	FIA World Rallycross champion (2016).	

== Deaths ==
Date	Month	Name	Age	Nationality	Occupation	Note	Ref
11	September	Ronnie Peterson	34	Swedish	Racing driver	10-time Grand Prix Winner	
20	October	Gunnar Nilsson	29	Swedish	Racing driver	1977 Belgian Grand Prix winner.	

== See also ==
- List of 1978 motorsport champions
