= Greg Anderson (drag racer) =

American Pro Stock Drag Racer

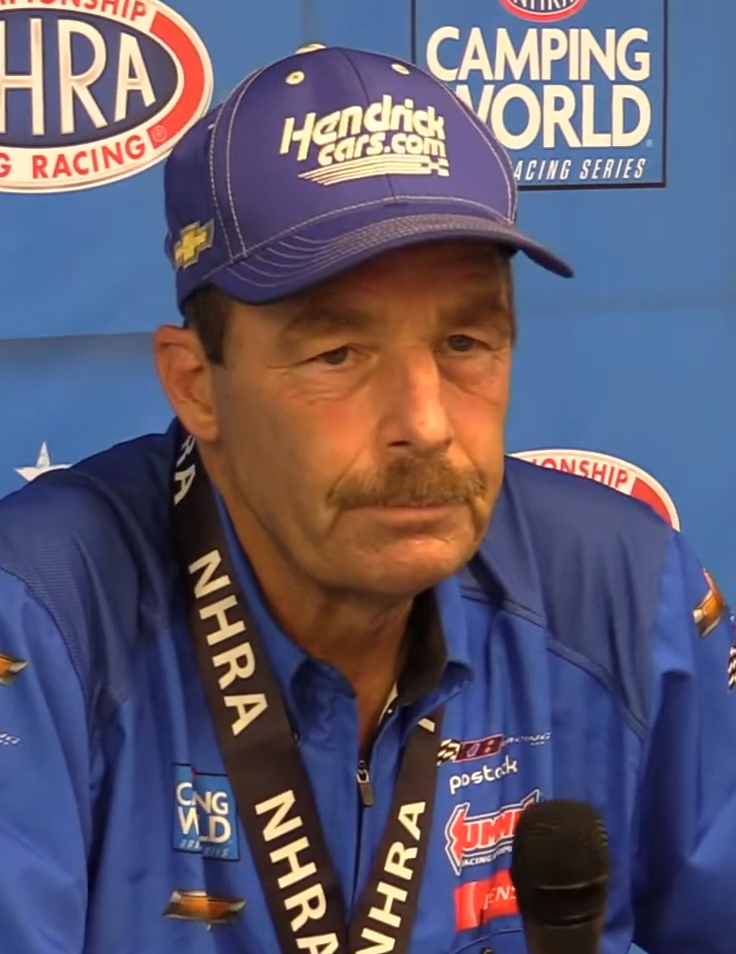
- Anderson in 2022
- Nationality: American
- Born: March 14, 1961 (age 65) Duluth, Minnesota, U.S.

NHRA Mission Foods Drag Racing Series career
- Current team: KB Titan Racing
- Years active: 1998–present
- Championships: 6 (PS)
- Wins: 116
- Fastest laps: Best ET; 6.443 seconds; Best Speed; 215.48 mph (346.78 km/h)

Championship titles
- 2003, 2004, 2005, 2010, 2021, 2024: NHRA Pro Stock Champion
- Statistics up to date as of September 15, 2025.

Greg Anderson (born March 14, 1961, in Duluth, Minnesota) is an American current NHRA Mission Foods Drag Racing Series Pro Stock owner, driver, and engine builder for KB Titan Racing, driving the Hendrick Automotive Group Chevrolet Camaro. He began his Pro Stock career in 1998. Greg previously served as Crew Chief for former pro stock champion Warren Johnson and tuned Warren to three pro stock championships (1992–93, 1995). Anderson is married to wife Kimberly and the couple have two children, Brittany and Cody. He resides in Concord, North Carolina. KB Titan Racing is a partnership of Anderson, Jim Whiteley and Eric Latino, who acquired the team from Ken Black at the end of the 2022 season, and participates in Pro Stock and Pro Modified.

== Awards ==
- Six-time NHRA Mission Foods Drag Racing Series Pro Stock World Champion (2003–05, 2010, 2021, 2024).
- Three-time Pro Stock champion as crew chief (1992–93, 1995).
- 116 career Pro Stock wins. |url-https://www.nhra.com/news/2026/kalitta-anderson-and-hagan-battle-their-way-wins-nhra-brainerd-nationals
- 2004 Speed Driver of the Year.
- In 2004 set NHRA Single Season Records in Round Wins (76), Wins (15), Final Rounds (19/23 races) #1 Qualifiers (16)
- Six-time NHRA U.S. Nationals winner (2000, '03, '04, '05, '06, '22).
- 1999: Became seventh member of the Speed Pro 200-mph Pro Stock Club with a 200.11-mph pass (Richmond).
- 2025: Became second member of the 1,000 Round Win Club.

Sporting positions
Preceded by Jeg Coughlin Jr.	NHRA Full Throttle Drag Racing Series Champion; Pro Stock; 2003-05	Succeeded by Jason Line
Preceded by Mike Edwards	NHRA Full Throttle Drag Racing Series Champion; Pro Stock; 2010	Succeeded by Jason Line
