= Jeg Coughlin Jr. =

American motorsports driver (born 1970)

- Coughlin in 2010
- Born: June 23, 1970 (age 56) Columbus, Ohio, U.S.
- Relatives: Cody Coughlin (nephew)

NHRA Mission Foods Drag Racing Series career
- Debut season: 1990
- Current team: Elite Motorsports
- Car number: 25
- Crew chief: Tim Freeman
- Championships: 5 (PS)
- Wins: 69 (PS)
- Fastest laps: Best ET; 6.484 seconds; Best Speed; 214.62 mph (345.40 km/h)

Championship titles
- 2000, 2002, 2007, 2008, 2013: NHRA Pro Stock Champion
- Statistics up to date as of September 17, 2025.

Jeg Coughlin Jr. (born June 23, 1970, in Columbus, Ohio) is an American motorsports driver, competing in the NHRA Mission Foods Drag Racing Series Pro Stock Division. He is a six-time world champion, winning the Pro Stock title five times and the Super Gas championship. He currently drives the SCAG Power Equipment / Outlaw Light Beer Pro Stock Camaro for Elite Motorsports as a teammate to Erica Enders. He is the son of Jeg Coughlin Sr., the founder of Jegs High Performance.

== History ==
Coughlin won his first world championship in 1992 by winning the NHRA Sportsman Super Gas category.

Coughlin raced full-time in the NHRA Powerade Drag Racing Series in 1998 in Pro Stock, winning the Rookie of the Year award.

The following year, Coughlin won five events in Pro Stock, finishing second in the final season points standings. The next year he would double his win total for the season (10 wins in 14 finals), and would win his first NHRA Pro Stock Championship.

In 2001, Coughlin won three times, and in the course of the season he would set a national record for quickest elapsed time at Reading, Pennsylvania with a 6.750 second run (he has since surpassed that, taking nearly seven tenths of a second off his best time).

Coughlin Jr's pro stock car at Sonoma in 2026

Driving a Chevrolet in 2002, Coughlin rolled to his second championship, including winning eight of the final 12 events of the season. He couldn't duplicate that the following year, but he did set a personal best speed and finished in the top-five in the points, winning twice. He beat his best speed and best time marks in 2004, but wasn't nearly as successful as he had been the previous years.

Coughlin changed teams that offseason, taking his sponsorship to Don Schumacher's team, and switching to Dodge Stratuses for the season. He didn't have a lot of success in 2005, but he managed to win the final race at Pomona, California before taking the 2006 season off.

Coughlin has been competing in the NHRA Lucas Oil Sportsman Series in 2006 and in the past, and has won 12 events. He has 46 combined wins in the Professional series and the Sportsman series.

In 2007, Coughlin drove the Jeg's Chevrolet Cobalt for Victor Cagnazzi Racing to the NHRA Powerade Pro Stock Championship. It was his full-time return to the Pro Stock class.

Coughlin collected three victories and his fourth NHRA Pro Stock Championship in 2008. He went to five final rounds with three of them coming in the NHRA Countdown to One. His consistency throughout the season never dropped him below fourth in the championship points.

After sitting out the 2011 season, Coughlin returned to the quarter mile in 2012, driving a Dodge Avenger with Mopar and JEGS sponsorship.

On November 10, 2013, Coughlin won his 5th Pro Stock championship after Jason Line lost in round 2 in Pomona.

Coughlin debuted his JEGS.com/Mopar Dodge Dart at the NHRA Gatornationals for the 2014 season. He won two races in six final-round appearances.

Coughlin made three starts for Elite Motorsports in 2015, reaching the final in Seattle.

For 2016, Coughlin returned to full-time competition with Elite Motorsports, driving a Dodge Dart as Erica Enders' teammate.

Coughlin holds several NHRA records. Coughlin is the only driver to collect victories in four categories in one season, when in 1997 he won on Pro Stock, Super Stock, Competition, and Super Gas. He is also the only professional drag racer to win from all 16 qualifying spots. Plus, Coughlin is the one of two drivers to win a national event in seven different classes: Pro Stock, Comp, Super Stock, Super Comp, Super Gas and Top Dragster.

Sporting positions
Preceded by Warren Johnson	NHRA Full Throttle Drag Racing Series Champion; Pro Stock; 2000	Succeeded by Warren Johnson
Preceded by Warren Johnson	NHRA Full Throttle Drag Racing Series Champion; Pro Stock; 2002	Succeeded by Greg Anderson
Preceded by Jason Line	NHRA Full Throttle Drag Racing Series Champion; Pro Stock; 2007–08	Succeeded by Mike Edwards
Preceded by Allen Johnson	NHRA Mello Yello Drag Racing Series Champion; Pro Stock; 2013	Succeeded by Erica Enders-Stevens
