= Junior Stock: Drag Racing the Family Sedan =

Book by Doug Boyce

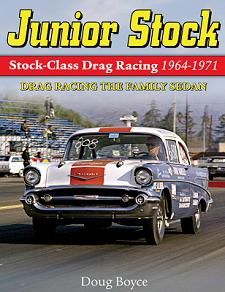
- Author: Doug Boyce
- Cover artist: Les Welch
- Language: English
- Genre: Drag racing
- Publisher: CarTech Books
- Publication date: August 15, 2012
- Publication place: Canada, United States
- Media type: Print (Paperback)
- Pages: 160 pages
- ISBN: 978-1934709917

Junior Stock: Drag Racing the Family Sedan is a 2012 book by author Doug Boyce. The book focuses on NHRA stock-class drag racing that took place between the years 1964 and 1971.

This is the second book by Doug Boyce, the first being, Grumpy's Toys: The Authorized History of Grumpy Jenkins' Cars.

== Overview ==
In the 1950s and 1960s, drag racing was in its infancy, a new sport which anyone with a car could participate. Based upon the car's equipment, they were assigned to specific categories and classes. The stock class format encouraged amateur participation. This structure made it possible to compete against others with similar equipment and lead to the best tuners and drivers becoming National Champions and/or World Record holders. Drag racing was a popular hobby for many, and initially their competition vehicles were typically warmed-over street cars that had been strategically upgraded to the limits of their class rules. Major stock category rule changes in 1972 meant a loss of participation and a loss in the sport's popularity.
