= Don Nicholson =

American drag racer (1927–2006)

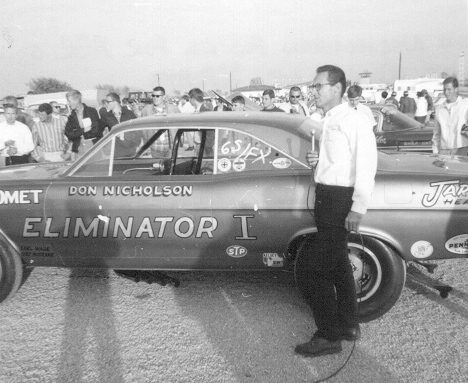
- Nicholson during an interview on ABC-TV's "Wide World of Sports" beside Eliminator I in 1966
- Nationality: American
- Born: May 28, 1927 Halltown, Missouri, U.S.
- Died: January 24, 2006 (aged 78)

National Hot Rod Association Pro Stock
- Years active: late 1940s – 2001+
- Best finish: 1st in 1977

Awards
- 18th on NHRA's Top 50 Drivers (2001); International Drag Racing Hall of Fame; Motorsports Hall of Fame of America (1998)

Don Nicholson (May 28, 1927 – January 24, 2006) was an American drag racer from Missouri. He raced in the 1960s and 1970s when there were few national events. The National Hot Rod Association (NHRA) estimates he won 90 percent of his match races. As of 2002, he held the record for the most number of categories in which he reached a final round (won or took second at an event): Funny Car, Pro Stock, Super Stock, Competition Eliminator, Stock, and Street. He was nicknamed "Dyno Don" after he was one of the first drivers to use a chassis dynamometer on his cars in the late 1950s, a skill that he learned while working as a line mechanic at a Chevrolet car dealer.

== Racing career ==
Nicholson was born in Halltown, Missouri but was raised in Pasadena, California. While in high school, he joined the United States Navy which wiped out his many speeding tickets, earned at the wheel of a twin-97-equipped 235 cu in (3,850 cc) Stovebolt-powered 1934 Chevy coupé (run without front fenders), which he (illegally) street raced; almost everyone else raced Fords.

Nicholson began organized racing in jalopies on oval tracks in the late 1940s before quitting in 1949, because his friends were frequently killed. He moved to the dry lakes at the Bonneville and El Mirage. He was already an experienced driver when drag strips began opening in Southern California. In the 1940s, Nicholson did body work and engine building, but did not drive. During the 1950s, Nicholson was a manager at Service Chevrolet. He got a job with Mead Chevrolet in Pasadena in 1958. Nicholson got his nickname "Dyno Don" by being the first person to be trained on Service's dynamometer (dyno). In 1961, Nally Chevrolet lured Nicholson to move his family to Georgia by giving him his own dyno shop and race car.

=== Drag racing ===
In 1958, Nicholson acted as tuner for the Greth Brothers B/Fuel Dragster, based out of Monrovia, California. At Bakersfield on 3 August 1958, with Bill Crossley at the wheel, this car was the first West Coast dragster to record a 170 mph (270 km/h) pass; the small-block powered digger took the B/F title, beating Emory Cook for Top Eliminator, at that meet, too.

Nicholson became nationally known to drag racing fans when he won the Stock class at NHRA's first Winternationals in 1961 with a 12-second pass; he and Ronnie Sox raced the only two Chevrolets, when Fords were the standard. The win helped his business in Southern California, and gave him access to factory-developed Chevrolets and special racing parts. He repeated as the 1962 Winternationals winner. He received lucrative offers from promoters in the Southeastern United States, so moved to Atlanta to compete in match races. Chevrolet and the other American car manufacturers decided to drop their factory backing in 1963 and his vehicle became uncompetitive. He switched to a Mercury Comet for 1964 in the A/Factory Experimental (A/FX) class. He won over 90 percent of match races he entered that year. That year he made the first ten-second pass in a doorslammer, as well as being the first driver to lift the front wheels when he shifted gears.

==== Funny Car ====
In 1965, Dodge and Plymouth teams moved their front and rear wheels forward, giving them greater traction. These new "funny cars" were not allowed in NHRA meets. Ford disallowed their factory-supported Ford and Mercury teams competing against these new Mopar funny cars. Nicholson was concerned about losing his match racing income since his car was outclassed. That August, he converted his steel-bodied four-speed car to ah A/FX, switching to nitromethane and fuel injection and moving the rear axle forward 12 in (30 cm). Several weeks later, he defeated the Ramcharger Dodge, the top Mopar entry, with a 9.30 second pass at 150 mph (240 km/h).

Mercury commissioned a new tube chassis Comet for 1966. The Logghe Bros.-built car featured a one piece flip-top body. Nicholson's car, Eliminator I, was rarely defeated that season. It clocked the first 7-second e.t. in Funny Car at Michigan in the second half of 1966. The only driver capable of defeating Eliminator I was Nicholson's teammate Eddie Schartman. Nicholson was so dominant, critics predicted the demise of the new Funny Car "craze". He enjoyed another highly successful year in Eliminator II in 1967, until other teams started adding superchargers late in the year. Other teams had run superchargers before, but by the middle of 1967, tire technology had caught up to the power produced by these cars and they began to "hook up" better rather than just spin the tires. Nicholson started the 1968 season with his now-supercharged Comet. He won the Irwindale New Year's Day race, where he qualified number two with a 8.03 and went on to set low e.t. of the meet at 7.99, and won the event. At the AHRA meet at Lion's Dragway in January, he qualified number one (low e.t.) with a strong 7.63 but failed to win the meet. He did win the second annual Stardust National Open, beating Schartman in the final round, with a 7.83 pass, low e.t. of the meet. Most of Nicholson's earnings at this time came from match race competition. During 1968, Nicholson became concerned about engine fires caused by blower explosions.

==== Super Stock/Pro Stock ====
After the 1968 season, Nicholson organized a match racing group, along with Ronnie Sox (of Sox & Martin), Bill "Grumpy" Jenkins, and "Dandy Dick" Landy. These Super Stock cars were a throwback to the A/FXs of the mid-1960s. The 2,300 lb (1,000 kg) four-speed carburated cars raced heads-up (instead of handicapped like the NHRA did).

"The Funny Cars had just gotten too out of hand," said Nicholson. "They no longer resembled what Detroit was trying to sell. Chrysler already had backed out of Funny Car racing in 1967 when they had Sox & Martin and Landy start their Super Stock clinics. We just wanted to get our original fans back."

Nicholson converted a Jerry Harvey 1966 A/FX Ford Mustang to Super Stock, and used the car to win Street in A/Modified Production at the 1969 Springnationals. The popularity of the 9 second heads-up racers led to NHRA forming Pro Stock in 1970. Nicholson prepared a Ford Maverick for the Winternationals in seven days, but did not win. The car was dominant on the match racing circuit, winning 45 straight rounds.

Nicholson's Maverick earned Ford's first NHRA Pro Stock win at the Summernationals in 1971. He switched to a 351 Cleveland-powered Pinto for 1972. He started the 1973 season by winning three consecutive national events at the American Hot Rod Association (AHRA) Winternationals, NHRA Winternationals, and NHRA Gatornationals. In 1973, following an NHRA rule change to allow records to be set at any national meet, at the Winternationals, Nicholson set the first official Super Stock e.t. record with a 9.33; later at the same event, he turned in a 9.01 second/150.50 mph (242.21 km/h) pass, breaking his own e.t. record, and Bill Jenkins' 148.76 mph (239.41 km/h) speed record, set earlier at the same meet.

Nicholson finished second at the 1974 U.S. Nationals and 1976 Summernats.

==== 1977 Pro Stock championship ====
Nicholson ran mainly regional match races most years. He decided to compete in the complete NHRA Nationals tour in 1977. He won the Gatornationals, Springnationals, and U.S. Nationals to win the 1977 Winston championship. His most famous race of the season was one he did not win. His chief rival was 1976 champion Larry Lombardo, who drove for Bill Jenkins. At that time, season championships were decided by a combination of regional and national events. Nicholson attended a divisional event Lombardo needed to win. "We qualified low on purpose so that we could race Larry early in eliminations," said Nicholson. "I beat him in the first round and kept him from earning a lot of points he otherwise would have earned." Lombardo ended up third in the season points, and Nicholson beat Bob Glidden by 1400 points to win the championship.

==== Later career ====
Nicholson made another championship run in 1979, finishing third. After starting the 1980 season by failing to qualify for the Winternationals and Cajun Nationals, Nicholson looked at IHRA Pro Stockers. He did qualify for the Springnationals, where he lost in the second round when his Mustang II broke, and the Summernationals, where he lost in the first round. He returned to Pro Stock at Milan for IHRA's Northern Nationals and went on to win the event. At the IHRA Summernationals at Bristol, Nicholson set top speed at 169.45 on the way to a runner-up finish. He had a brand new Mustang built to replace his "old" Mustang II and he debuted it at Maryland International Raceway's Mountain Motor Nationals, but lost in the first round. The 1981 season saw Nicholson qualify #1 at the AHRA Winter Nationals and was runner-up. He did run a NHRA combination as well. The 500 cu in (8,200 cc)-powered car qualified at the NHRA Winternationals but went out in an early round. He also qualified for the NHRA Gatornationals but he failed to reach the final. Where Nicholson stood out was in IHRA Pro Stock. He qualified number one (low e.t.) at Darlington for the IHRA Winternationals with a pass of 7.81 seconds at 176 mph (283 km/h). He lost in the second round to a holeshot. In April, Nicholson went to Atlanta for the NHRA Southern Nationals. He qualified well and made it into the semi-final, where he had a front wheel come off in the traps. Nicholson avoided hitting the rail. On May 3, he won his last IHRA event. the Pro Am Championships, at Rockingham. His car was, by this time, known as the quickest in IHRA Pro Stock and once again proved it by qualifying #1 with a pass of 7.82 seconds at 176.81 mph (284.55 km/h). He went on to win the event. Shortly after this, he sold his Pro Stock operation to Harold Denton, who retained Nicholson for the next few races to acquaint himself with the car. Nicholson's tuning aided Denton to a runner-up finish at the next IHRA event, the Springnationals, at Bristol. They may have won too, except for a burned out clutch in the final. Nichoson continued to race a Pro Stock Ford until 1980. Nicholson made a comeback in 1984 in an Oldsmobile. He returned in 1988 in the nostalgia tour in a version of 1962 Chevrolet Bel Air, which he was still campaigning in 2001. He also made some appearances in a Pro Stock Truck in 1998 and 1999.

== Death ==
Nicholson's health deteriorated over his last few years. He died from Alzheimer's disease on January 24, 2006, in Southern California at age 78. He was survived by his daughter Cindy Christie, grandson Christopher Christie and granddaughter Candace Christie.

== Awards ==
Nicholson was ranked 18th on NHRA's Top 50 Drivers list in 2001. Nicholson was awarded the Funny Car Driver of the Year in 1967. He received the Car Craft All-star Drag Racing Team Ollie Award in 1977. In 1997 he was honored as the grand marshal of the California Hot Rod Reunion.

Nicholson has been inducted in several halls of fame. He was inducted in the International Drag Racing Hall of Fame, and the Motorsports Hall of Fame of America in 1998.
