= Wally Parks =

American writer

- Parks in 2004
- Born: Wallace Gordon Parks; January 23, 1913; Goltry, Oklahoma, U.S.
- Died: September 28, 2007 (aged 94); Burbank, California, U.S.
- Occupations: Founder, President, Chairman of NHRA; automobile writer, editor, and hobbyist.
- Awards: International Motorsports Hall of Fame; Motorsports Hall of Fame of America

Wallace Gordon Parks (January 23, 1913 – September 28, 2007) was an American writer. He was the founder, president, and chairman of the National Hot Rod Association, better known as NHRA. He was instrumental in establishing drag racing as a legitimate amateur and professional motorsport.

== Biography ==
Parks was an accomplished automobile writer and hobbyist, and co-founder and first editor of the magazine Hot Rod in January 1948. He was also instrumental in the founding of Motor Trend magazine in September 1949. As editor of Hot Rod, he began to promote safety in the organization of drag racing, both in the magazine and by organizing "Safety Safaris," the first of which toured the United States in 1954, teaching drag race organization and safety at tracks around the country. This was the first concerted effort in getting racers off the streets and onto controlled race tracks.

In 1951, Parks founded the National Hot Rod Association, which stands today as the largest motorsports sanctioning body in the world, and became its president for several decades after leaving the magazine business. His wife, Barbara, who preceded him in death in 2006, worked for the NHRA as its Chief Secretary in its formative years.

Parks played a part in promoting drag racing outside of the United States, organizing tours to England in 1964 and 1965, in collaboration with Sydney Allard, and to Australia in 1966.

Winners of National Hot Rod Association national events are awarded a trophy statue nicknamed the Wally. The trophy is a bronze statue of a Top Gas racer next to a tire on a wooden platform. As the NHRA celebrated its 60th anniversary season in 2011, pewter Wally trophies were awarded to all of the winners during that season. Other events celebrating milestones may award Wally trophies in varying colors.

Parks died on September 28, 2007, due to complications from pneumonia, at the age of 94. Prior to his death, he was chairman of the Wally Parks NHRA Motorsports Museum in Pomona, California.

== Awards ==
Parks was inducted into the International Motorsports Hall of Fame in 1992.

Parks was inducted into the Motorsports Hall of Fame of America in 1993.

== Bibliography ==
- Parks, Wally (1966). Drag Racing: Yesterday and Today. New York: Trident Press. ISBN 978-0671215903.
