= Bob Glidden =

American drag racer

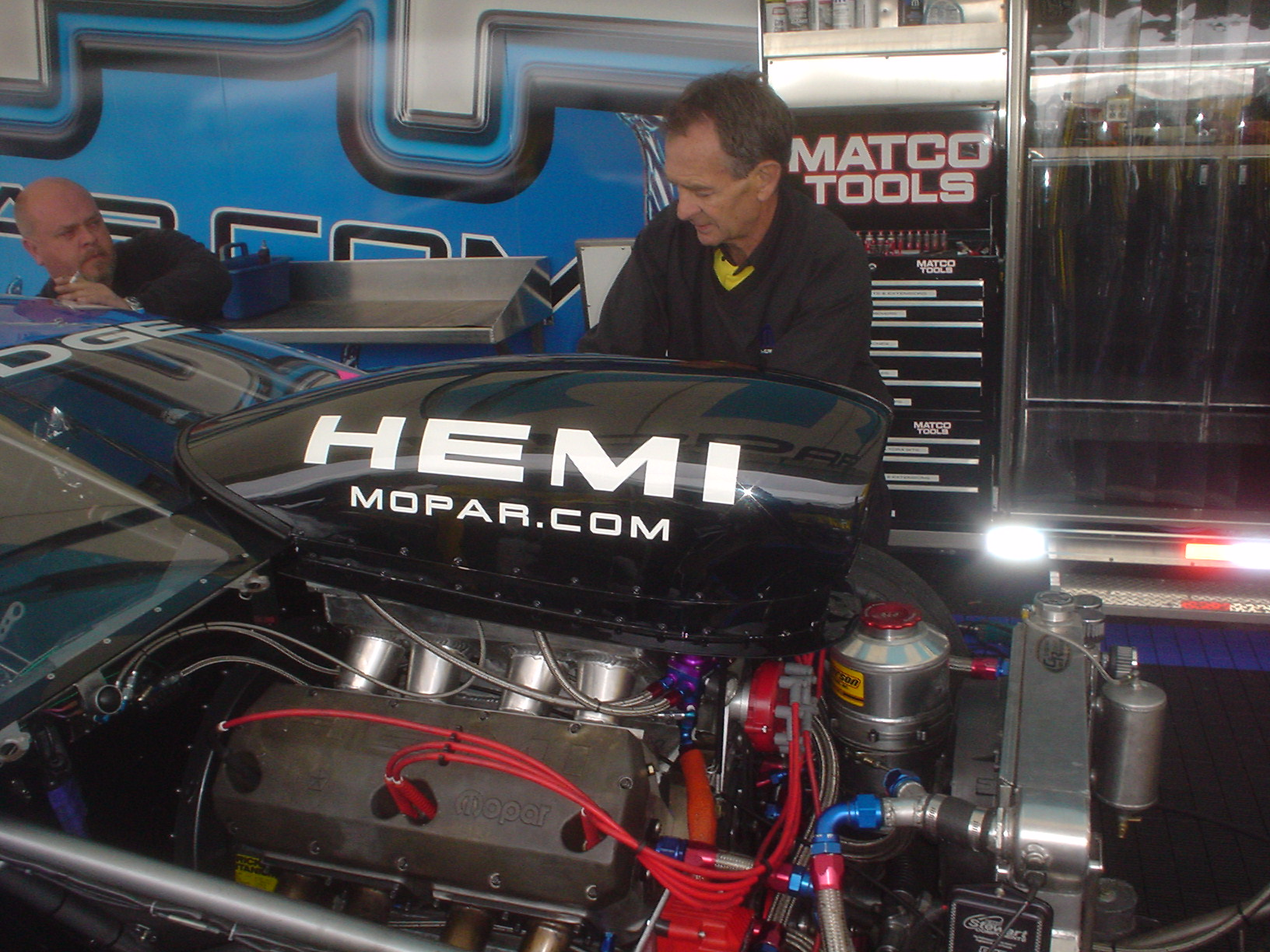
- Glidden in 2005
- Born: August 18, 1944; Whiteland, Indiana, U.S.
- Died: December 17, 2017 (aged 73); Whiteland, Indiana, U.S.
- Occupation: Drag racer
- Spouse: Etta Glidden
- Children: Rusty and Billy

NHRA Winston Drag Racing Series
- Years active: 1960s-1997, 2003, 2010
- Championships: 10 (PS)
- Wins: 85

Championship titles
- 1974, 1975, 1978-1980, 1985-1989: NHRA Pro Stock Champion

Awards
- 1994 2005: Motorsports Hall of Fame of America; International Motorsports Hall of Fame

Bob Glidden (August 18, 1944 – December 17, 2017) was an American drag racer. He retired from Pro Stock racing in 1997 and returned in 2010. Glidden retired as the driver with the most wins in National Hot Rod Association (NHRA) history at that time — a feat recently topped by 16-time Funny Car champion John Force — and he was the third-most successful drag racer of the professional class drivers — sixth when counting sportsman national event winners — at the time of his death. Glidden won 85 NHRA National Events. In the Professional classes, he was behind Force (147) and Warren Johnson (97). Currently, Glidden ranks fourth behind Greg Anderson (104). Glidden's ten Pro Stock championships included five in a row beginning in 1985. Among his numerous accomplishments, Glidden won nine straight NHRA national races in 1979 and was the No. 1 qualifier 23 times in a row, including the entire 1987 season. At one point, he won 50 eliminations rounds in a row.

Glidden almost became the first driver in a doorslammer (drag racing cars which are required to have operational doors, as opposed to funny cars or top fuel cars) to reach 200 miles per hour when he ran 199.11 miles per hour at an International Hot Rod Association (IHRA) race in Darlington, South Carolina. However, a Top Sportsman car driven by Bill Kuhlmann ran 202 miles per hour later that evening. He won 21 IHRA races and won one IHRA championship. In the late 2000s, Justin Humphreys added Pro Stock legend Bob Glidden to his RaceRedi Motorsports/Knoll-Gas Energy Pontiac GTO team.

== Racing career ==
Glidden began his drag racing career in the 1960s in a Ford 427 Fairlane. He is most closely associated with Ford cars, a manufacturer that he used throughout his career, except in 1979, winning the world championship in a Plymouth Arrow. In 1968 he changed to a 428 Cobra Jet Mustang. He started out in Stock and moved up to Super Stock. He was sponsored by Ed Martin Ford, where he worked as a mechanic. He was a frequent winner in Division 3 before turning Pro in 1972. In those days, the series included participation in both national and divisional races.

=== 1970s ===
Glidden sold his two Super Stock Mustangs late in the season 1972, and purchased a Pro Stock Pinto from Jack Roush and Wayne Gapp. He quit his job at Ed Martin Ford to race full-time. In his first Pro race, he finished second to Bill Jenkins at the final Supernationals of the 1972 season. Glidden had his first national win the following season at the U.S. Nationals. His 9.03 second pass, at a national record 152.54 mph (245.49 km/h), was #1 qualifying time in the fastest Pro Stock field. He beat Gapp in the event finals. 1974 was his second full season in Pro Stock. He won three events including the Springnationals and U.S. Nationals. That season he set the record for the lowest elapsed time (e.t.) and the highest speed (8.83 seconds and 154.90 mph (249.29 km/h), respectively) at a Division 3 event at Bowling Green, Kentucky. The feat earned him 400 bonus points towards the championship. He had an 8.81 second qualifying pass at the U.S. Nationals to lower his e.t. record, and beat Gapp in the final round. These wins contributed to his come-from-behind win to beat rivals Gapp and Wally Booth for the season championship.

Glidden followed with a banner year in 1975. He had five top qualifier runs and eight top speeds during the season. He used three cars during the season. While in a mid-season slump, he reacquired his 1974 Pinto. His seven events wins (including the Winternationals, World Finals, Gatornationals, and Fallnationals) helped propel him to his second straight Winston title. He set low e.t. six times. Glidden had an off year in 1976, finishing sixth in the points. He finished second in 1977 behind Don Nicholson.

Glidden returned for his third Winston title in 1978. He started the season in his Ford Pinto, winning at the season opening Winternationals and at the Cajun Nationals. The end of the season was in his Ford Fairmont, which took event wins at races including the Summernationals. Glidden finished the season undefeated in five national competitions. He had seven national victories that season, tying Don Prudhomme for the most that year. The seven wins broke the previous Pro Stock single season record of six wins set by Jenkins. He earned a record 16,035 points and lowered the national e.t. record time to 8.59 seconds.

Glidden retired his undefeated Ford Fairmont in 1979 in favor of a Plymouth Arrow. He opened the season with a victory at the Winternationals, and did not lose a round until June. The streak ended after 14 races and 50 rounds when he fouled in the second round at the Mile-High Nationals. He won seven national events, earning the maximum points at four events by setting low e.t., qualifying number one, and setting the top speed at each event. He also earned maximum points in his four divisional events.

=== 1980s ===
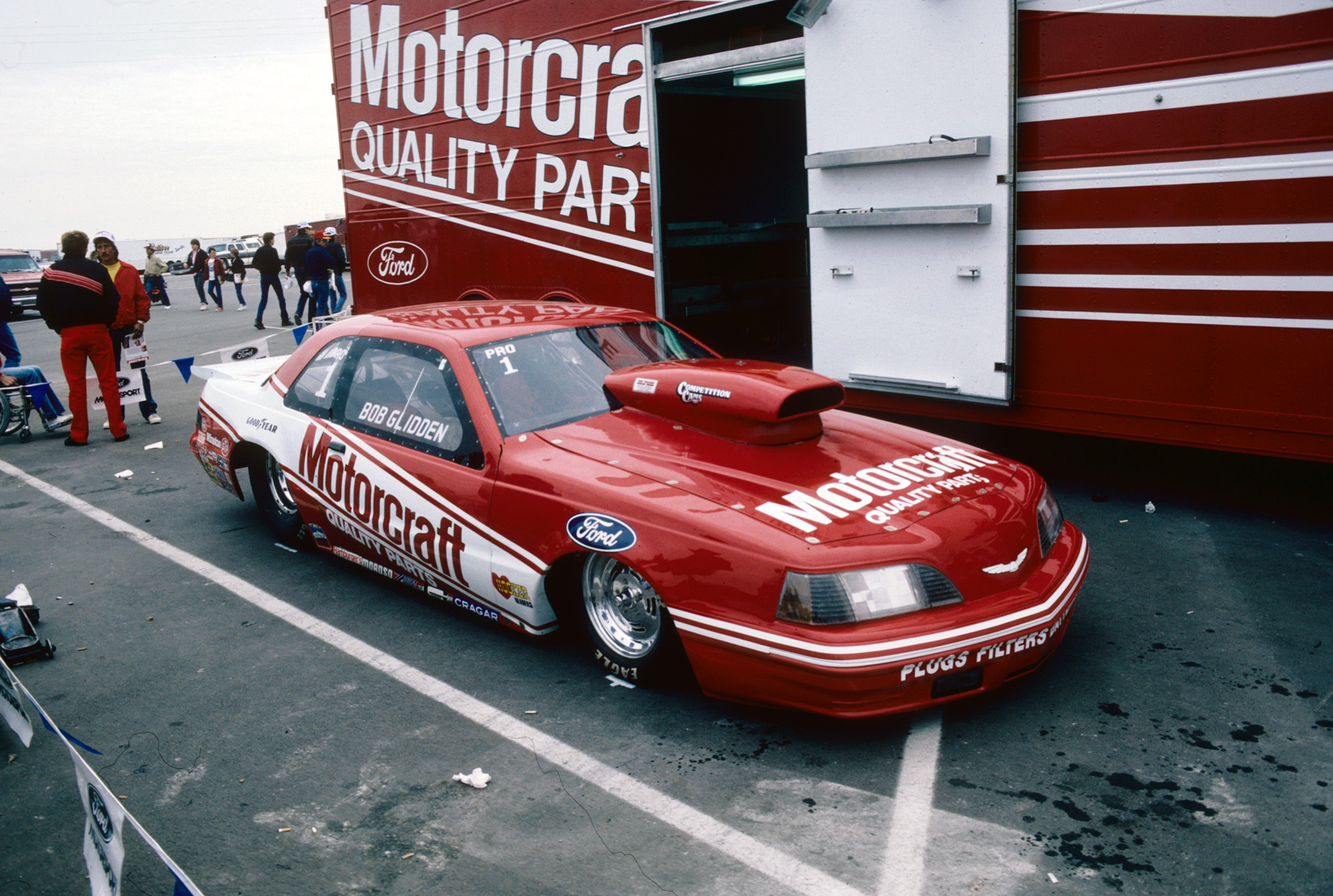
1987 Pro Stocker

Glidden chased Lee Shepherd for the 1980 Winston title all season, leading the points standing only after the final race. He won his fifth overall and third straight championship at the final event. He caught a break when Shepherd broke his transmission in the second round. Glidden set the low e.t. and top speed in his final round win to earn the maximum points and the season championship. Shepherd won the 1981 to 1984 Pro Stock championships. When NHRA went to its new 500 cu in (8,200 cc) limit in 1982, Glidden was caught unprepared. He was having chassis builder Don Hardy build a new EXP for the season and was planning on running a 351 Cleveland, in the car. With the new rules, he was forced to use the big Boss 429 in the short wheelbase car. The results were, as Glidden put it, "the worst handling race car he ever drove." He went on to state it drove like a fuel altered. In spite of this, he won one event, the Springnationals, and was runner-up in another three events. After that season, both he and Ford teammate Rickie Smith debuted new Ford Thunderbirds at the 1983 season opening Winternationals at Pomona. The new car did extremely well, qualifying first and setting set top speed of the meet at 177.86 mph (286.24 km/h) en route to a runner-up finish. The rest of the 1983 season went well with Glidden picking up victories at NHRA's Springnationals, Mile High Nationals, and Northstar Nationals; at the U.S. Nationals at Indianapolis, he set a new IRP e.t. record of 7.68 seconds. He ended the season at the NHRA World Finals at OCIR, and while he lost in the semi-finals, he did set a new NHRA Pro Stock speed record of 182.18 mph (293.19 km/h). Glidden received a new Thunderbird in the middle of the 1984 season, and it quickly became the dominant car on the Pro Stock circuit. Glidden led the 1985 points standings from start to finish, winning five national events. It was his sixth Pro Stock championship.

Glidden started the 1986 season out slowly. His Winternationals and Gatornationals ended in early round losses. After winning the semifinals of the Southern Nationals in April, his parachute was caught by a gust of wind. His Thunderbird spun, hitting the opposite guard rail. The car executed six barrel rolls as it was destroyed. Glidden was unhurt, and he quickly covered the now-exposed engine with his driver suit jacket to prevent competitors from analyzing and potentially copying elements of his engine. He returned at the Cajun Nationals with a different car. His first victory of the season came in July at the Mile-High Nationals. It was the first of his three straight victories. He won six of the last seven events to win his seventh Winston title.

In 1987, Glidden won eight races, including his 60th national event win. He ended his season with five straight wins and his eighth Pro Stock championship. He reached the finals ten times that season, winning a record 42 rounds of competition. He qualified number one in all 14 events. His two-season streak ended at the 1988 Gatornationals with 22 straight top qualifiers. His 1988 season was similar to 1987. After struggling early in the season, he won five of the last seven races en route to his fourth straight title. He retired his Thunderbird after 19 national victories in favor of a Ford Probe at the Supernationals. The cars set a national e.t. record at 7.277 seconds, the quickest Pro Stock run in NHRA history. He used the Probe to win at the Fallnationals, which was his 67th career victory.

Glidden dominated to win his tenth and final championship in 1989. He started the season on a strong note, winning five of the first seven events and seven out of the first eleven. He won nine times that season, ending the 1980s with 49 wins.

=== 1990s – early 2000s ===
Glidden won three events in 1990, one event in 1991, two events in 1992, and two events in 1993. He won his 85th and final national event at the Mopar Nationals in 1995, after missing most of the 1995 season due to open heart surgery during the off season. Glidden retired after two events in the 1997 season. He was dissatisfied with his sponsorship arrangement. After retiring, he worked on Ford's motor program for its Winston Cup program. He was the crew chief for numerous drivers following his retirement. He returned to the driver's seat for Steve Schmidt's team at the 1998 U.S. Nationals, but he failed to qualify for the event that he had won nine times previously.

== Awards ==
Glidden was inducted into the International Motorsports Hall of Fame in 2005. In 2001, a panel ranked him fourth in the National Hot Rod Association Top 50 Drivers, 1951–2000.

Glidden was inducted into the Motorsports Hall of Fame of America in 1994.

== Personal life ==
Glidden married Etta and the couple had sons Rusty and Billy. Etta was Bob's long-time crew chief and all three were part of his team. Members of the family have made numerous appearances on the Car Craft Magazine All-Star Drag Racing Team. Etta and their sons were named to the Team six times. Bob appeared on the team eleven times, including two times as Person of the Year and once as the Ollie Award winner for his career-long contributions to the sport. Glidden's son, Rusty, once raced against his father in a race in 1996, with the son beating the father. In the late 2000s Pro stock legend Bob Glidden joined Justin Humphreys racing team.
