= Ronnie Sox =

American drag racer (1922–2006)

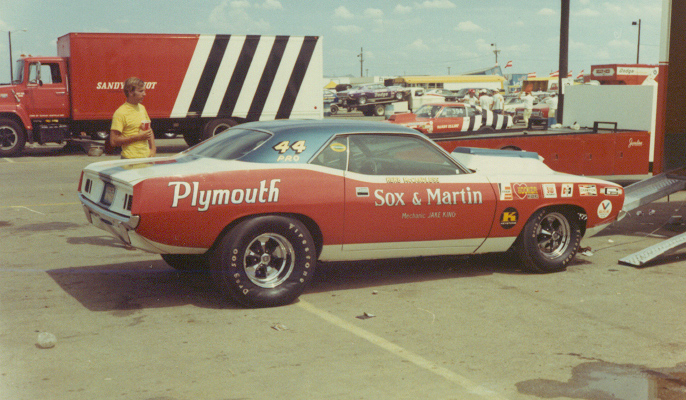
1971 Sox & Martin Pro Stock 'Cuda

Willard Ronald Sox (December 17, 1938 – April 22, 2006 in Richmond, Virginia) was an American drag racer.

Sox's family ran a Sinclair (SOX SINCLAIR) station on Church St. in Burlington, North Carolina, where got his start in drag racing in the 1950s when the Police Club of Burlington began hosting races at an airport.

Sox raced at tracks throughout North Carolina and became a national sensation in the 1960s and early 1970s. Sox won five National Hot Rod Association championships and more than 59 events. Together with racing partner Buddy Martin, Sox was the winningest Pro Stock driver (nine victories in 23 events) in the 1970-72 "four-speed era". Initially Martin and Sox were competitors, but Martin approached Sox to drive his car after concluding that he just couldn't beat him.

Sox drove a 1963 Chevrolet and then a factory-sponsored A/FX Mercury Comet in 1964.

In 1965, Sox drove an altered-Wheelbase Plymouth. He started the 1966 season in an injected, nitro-burning Barracuda Funny Car.

Sox later drove Plymouths in Pro Stock and had "Clinic" cars with Plymouths.

Sox went on to drive a Mercury Comet in IHRA Pro Modified for a few years before retiring from drag racing.

Sox was ranked 15th on the National Hot Rod Association Top 50 Drivers, 1951–2000.

Sox died of prostate cancer at the age of 67.

== Awards ==
Sox was inducted into the Motorsports Hall of Fame of America in 2007, along with Buddy Martin.
