= Jason Line =

American Pro Stock Drag Racer

- Line's pro stock car at Route 66 Raceway in 2016
- Nationality: American
- Born: July 24, 1969 (age 57)

NHRA Camping World Drag Racing Series
- Years active: 2003-2020
- Teams: KB Racing, Elite Motorsports, Ken Black Racing
- Championships: 3 (PS)

Championship titles
- 2006, 2011, 2016: NHRA Pro Stock Champion
- Statistics up to date as of September 15, 2025.

Jason Line (born July 24, 1969) is an American former drag racing driver who last drove the Elite Motorsports JHG Racing Chevrolet Camaro Pro Stock car in the NHRA Mello Yello Drag Racing Series. Line resides in Terrell, North Carolina with his wife, Cindy, son, Jack and daughter, Emma.

Line was born in Wright, Minnesota. Growing up near the Brainerd International Raceway in Brainerd, Minnesota, he learned engine repair from his father. As a teenager, Line acquired a 1970 Buick GS, which he raced at the local track. In 1993, he won the NHRA Division 5 championship and the NHRA National Stock Championship.

Line retired from full-time Pro Stock driving at the end of the 2020 season.

== Awards ==
- 51 career NHRA wins (49 in Pro Stock as well as 2 in the Sportsman Classes)
- Has a career best E.T. of 6.455 seconds, and a career best speed of 215.17 miles per hour (346.28 km/h)
- With the Jesel Land Speed/Summit Racing Team, Jason Broke the A/Modified Production Speed Record of 191 mph with an impressive 225.246 mph at Bonneville Flats in 2012
- Won 2006, 2011 & 2016 NHRA Pro Stock Championships.
- 2004 NHRA Rookie of The Year.
- Finished second to teammate Greg Anderson in the 2004 NHRA championship.
- Won 1993 NHRA Stock Eliminator Championship.

Stats are current as of November 12, 2019

http://nhra.com/drivers/pro-stock/Jason-Line/

== Trivia ==
- Served in the United States Air Force from 1987–1991.
- Began working for Joe Gibbs' NASCAR team in 1998, where he served as Chief Dynamometer Engine Specialist.
- Competed in first NHRA race in 1985 driving a 1968 Chevelle at Brainerd International Raceway.

https://web.archive.org/web/20150904032000/http://www.nhra.com/points/national-records.aspx

Sporting positions
Preceded by Greg Anderson	NHRA Full Throttle Drag Racing Series Champion; Pro Stock; 2006	Succeeded by Jeg Coughlin Jr.
Preceded by Greg Anderson	NHRA Full Throttle Drag Racing Series Champion; Pro Stock; 2011	Succeeded by Allen Johnson
