= Pat Austin =

American racing driver

- Nationality: American
- Born: November 12, 1964 (age 61) Tacoma, Washington, U.S.

NHRA Alcohol Funny Car
- Years active: 1985 – ?
- Teams: self-owned
- Wins: 75+
- Best finish: 1st in 1987, 1988, 1990, 1991

Awards
- 2001: ranked 13th on NHRA's Top 50 drivers

Pat Austin (born November 12, 1964) is an American former drag racer. He competed in the National Hot Rod Association (NHRA). He won four NHRA Top Alcohol Funny Car championships between 1987 and 1991. He was the first driver to win eliminator titles at the same event when he won the Top Fuel and Alcohol Funny Car classes at Topeka. His 62 wins between his start in 1985 and 1996, which were the most for any driver between the late 1970s and 1996.

In 2002, the NHRA labeled him "the most successful drag racer born after the 1940s and the best driver of his generation". He had the first 250 mph (400 km/h) Alcohol Funny Car run and the first pass in the 5.5-second range.

== Racing career ==
A native of Tacoma, Washington, Austin attended Franklin Pierce High School, where he won two state championships in the shot put. Austin was named an All-Star on his high school football team during his senior year.

He began drag racing in the Northwestern United States, where he won approximately 90 percent of the races that he entered. He started racing on the national tour in 1985. Austin won his first national event title in 1986, when he won the Cajun Nationals. He won the next event, the Springnationals. He had numerous second-place finishes and lost the 1986 season championship at the final round at the Fallnationals to Brad Anderson.

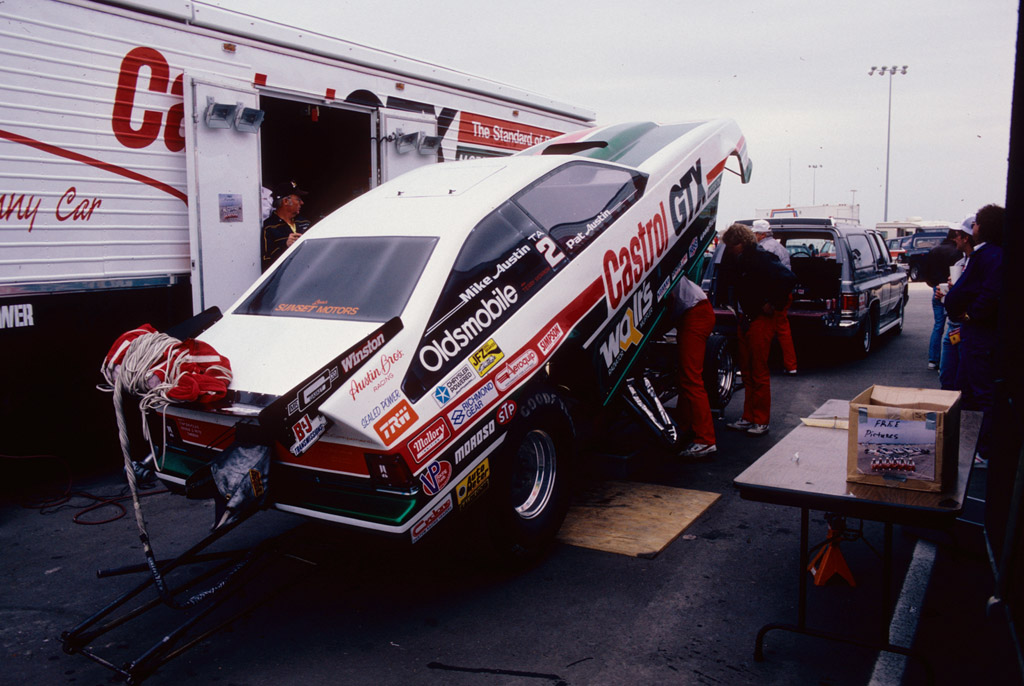
1987 Alcohol Funny Car

Austin won his first national championship the following year. He won four of the five championships between 1987 and 1991, losing the 1989 championship. Austin made eight finals in 1987 and won six events. He followed that season with his second championship in 1988. That season was highlighted by six wins, including his first U.S. Nationals win. He had his most wins in 1989 with nine wins (including the U.S. Nationals). Brad Anderson won the season championship after Anderson did better in divisional races. Austin won the 1990 championship with 12 finals and nine event wins. Austin clinched the 1991 championship in July (with four months left) after posting the first perfect five national and five divisional wins season. Following the death of Gary Ormsby from cancer; Austin bought his Castrol GTX Top Fuel operation before the U.S. Nationals. He campaigned both cars at the event after testing his new Top Fuel dragster at one local event. After winning the Alcohol Funny Car finals at one of the next events, his blower malfunctioned during his burnout at the finals. Austin had to watch Kenny Bernstein as he smoked his tires to win the Top Fuel finals in a single. Austin continued to run both cars at events, vowing to win in both cars. His double eliminator win came two events later at Topeka. He won the Alcohol Funny Car finals over Chuck Cheeseman with a 5.97 second pass and the Top Fuel finals over Joe Amato with a 4.97 second pass. Austin avenged his final round Top Fuel loss to Bernstein at the Winston Finals at Pomona and started the 1992 season by winning the second race of the year at the Motorcraft Ford Nationals in Phoenix Arizona over Doug Herbert. Between 1987 and 1991, he entered 57 national event finals and won 43 of them.

Austin achieved the second double eliminator win at the second event in 1992 at Phoenix. He won the Top Fuel finals and beat his uncle, rival Bucky Austin, in the Alcohol Funny Car finals. Austin won Top Fuel at the 1993 U.S. Nationals at Indianapolis Raceway Park over Doug Herbert in a tire-smoking peddlefest final round. His fifth and final Top Fuel win was at Englishtown over Don "The Snake" Prudhomme in 1994 winning with a 4.88 to Prudhomme's 4.89. His last final round came in 1995 at Sonoma California losing to Mike Dunn. Austin became the first driver to achieve 250 miles per hour in the quarter mile in an Alcohol Funny Car in 1995.

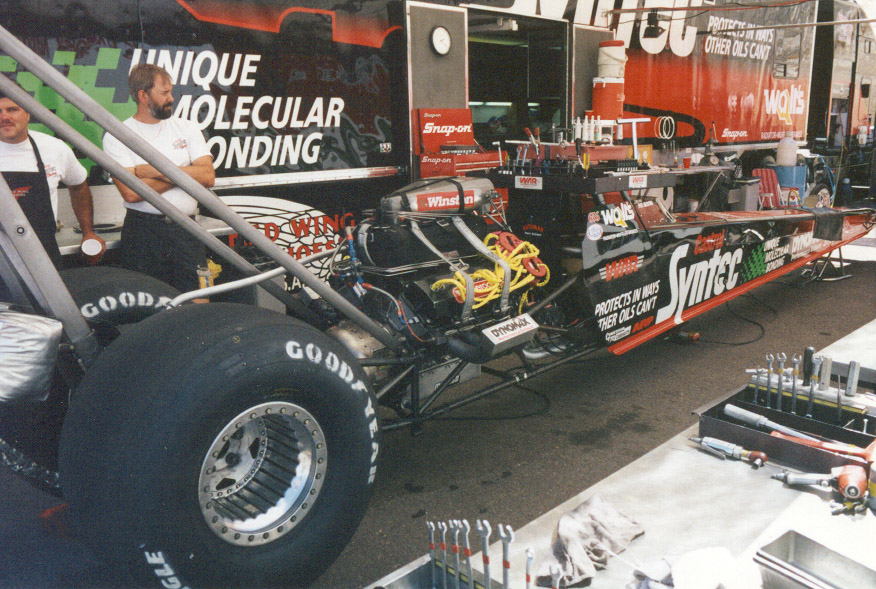
1995 Top Fuel dragster

In 1999, Austin noticed that IHRA drivers such as Von Smith having success in Hoosier Racing Tires. Austin had been experiencing severe tire shake and tire spinning problems. So he purchased a set of Hoosiers at the U.S. Nationals and used them in second round qualifying at the next event at Dallas, which was the first time that Hoosiers were used in an NHRA event. After having a relatively slow pass, he made gear ratio adjustments at later events. He started using the tires for all passes after having a 5.64 second pass. He had the first pass in the 5.5 second range (5.56 seconds at 257 mph) and won the race, marking the first time that a Hoosier tire won an NHRA Alcohol Funny Car event.

In 2000, Austin recorded his 70th career victory, which put him fourth on the NHRA all-time win list. He had his 75th national victory at Pomona's 2002 NHRA Winternationals. At that time he had 81 points wins for a total of 156 victories.

Austin now runs the Pat Austin's Pro Max Performance Centers, which is a national automotive parts dealer and it services cars in the Puget Sound.

== Personal life ==
Pat and his wife, Keila, have a son named Drew and a daughter named Allison.

His father (Walt Austin), mother, brother Mike, and sister have helped on his team. Walt Austin competed in drag racing from the 1950s to 1970s. He inherited his father's muffler and radiator shop in 1968. Walt's brother Bucky started on his pit crew until opening a rival muffler shop in 1970. Bucky Austin had over 200 drag racing wins at Northwestern regional NHRA, AHRA and open matches. Pat described their relationship, "We've had our tense moments, just the same way as the businesses have been treated. It's competition. It's no different than having a one-on-one basketball game, except we're all grown up. It's never been bad blood."

== Awards ==
In 2001, the NHRA ranked him 13th in their Top 50 drivers of all-time.
