= Frank Manzo =

Frank Manzo, nicknamed "Ace" or the "Manz", is an American funny car drag racer, named to the 2010 American Auto Racing Writers & Broadcasters Association All-America Team.

== History ==
Manzo drove a BB/FC (supercharged gas funny car) Chevrolet Monza. Following an appearance at the 1978 NHRA Summernationals, he would go on to win several national events.

In 2010, when he was racing a Top Alcohol funny car, Manzo was named to the American Auto Racing Writers & Broadcasters Association All-America Team.
