= Bill Jenkins (drag racer) =

American drag racer (1930–2012)

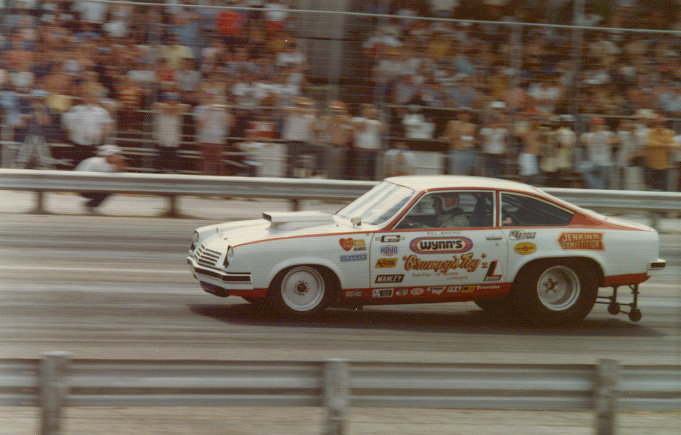
Jenkins' Grumpy's Toy X 1975 Chevrolet Vega Pro Stock Car

William Tyler Jenkins (December 22, 1930 – March 29, 2012), nicknamed "Grumpy" or "The Grump", was an engine builder and drag racer. Between 1965 and 1975, he won a total of thirteen NHRA events. Most of these wins were won with a four-speed manual transmission. In 1972 he recorded 250 straight passes without missing a shift.

Jenkins was formally trained as a mechanical engineer at Cornell University, although he completed only three years and did not earn a degree. He later used his training and skills to build engines. He has been inducted in numerous motorsports halls of fame for his engine building skills in the National Hot Rod Association (NHRA) Pro Stock class. His innovations include drag racing's first kickout oil pans, Pro Stock strut-style front suspension, and dry sump oiling system, and cool cans, electric water pump fan, gas port pistons, and slick-shift manual transmissions. Considered the "Father of Pro Stock", Jenkins-built engines were used to win five NHRA Pro Stock championships and three American Hot Rod Association (AHRA) championships.

Jenkins was nicknamed "Grumpy" for having a no-nonsense attitude at races. The Motorsports Hall of Fame of America said: "his continual search for improved performance left little time for idle chatter with his racing colleagues."

== Career ==
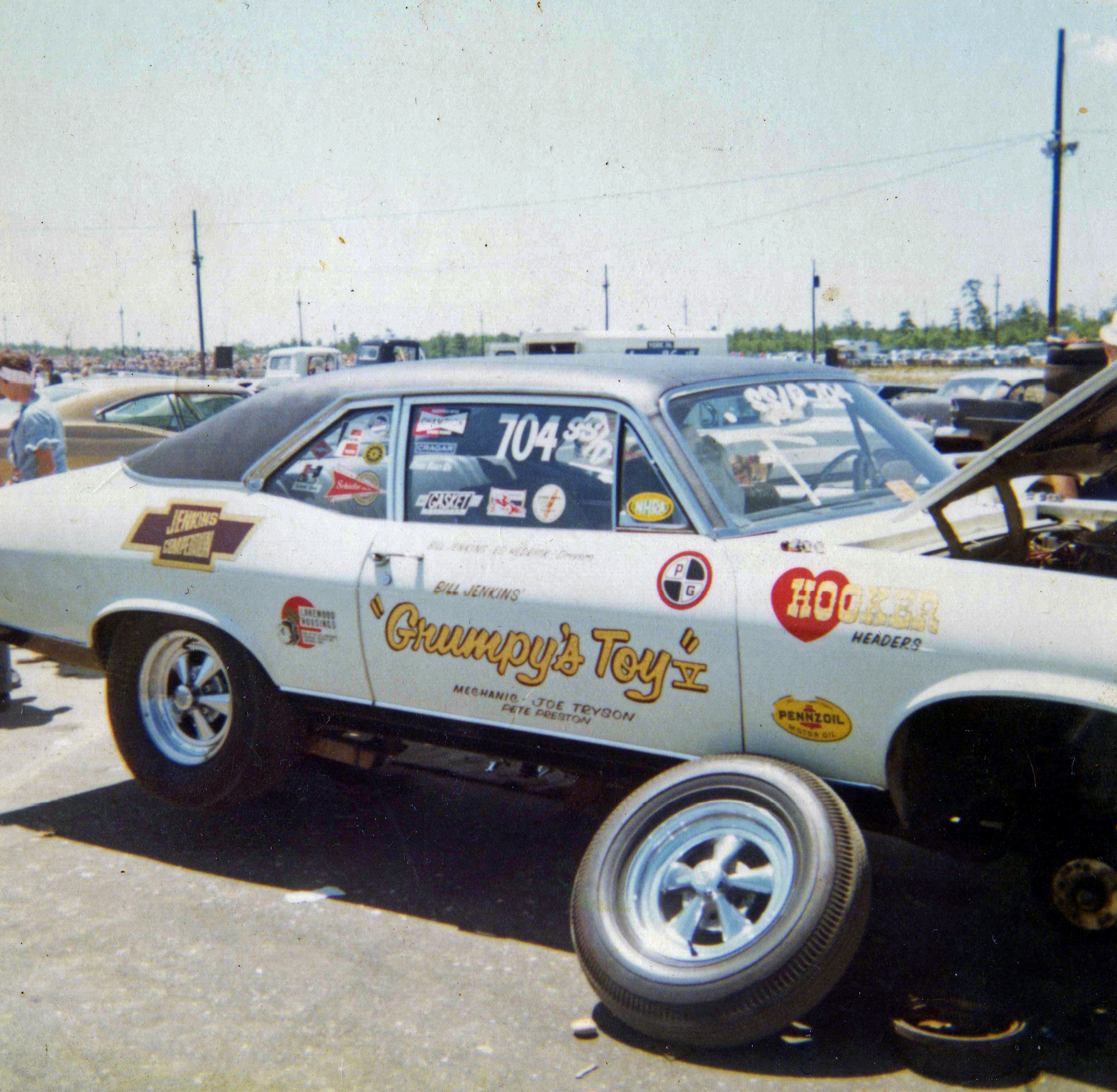
Grumpy's Toy V

Born in Philadelphia, Jenkins grew up in Malvern, Pennsylvania. He started working on motors on his neighbor's tractor engine. He began drag racing in a 1955 Chevrolet convertible at Berwyn, Pennsylvania before going off to college at Cornell University for engineering. He left college in his third year. He became nationally known after helping to build 30 cars that set national records. He became known in national circles as the engine builder for Dave Strickler in the early 1960s. Jenkins teamed with Strickler to win Little Eliminator at the 1963 Nationals with an A/FX 427 Chevy. He drove hemi-powered Dodges in 1964 and 1965 after Chevy left drag racing early in the 1963 season. In 1964, Jenkins and Strickler travelled to England, as part of the U.S. Drag Racing team, to take part in the First International Drag Festival, a series of six events held that fall.

Jenkins won the A/MP (A/Modified Production) class in a 1965 Plymouth gasser at the 1965 NHRA Nationals at Indianapolis Raceway Park, with a pass of 11.11 seconds at 130.24 mph (209.60 km/h). He would also win S/SA at the 1965 Winternationals in a hemi-powered Plymouth named Black Arrow. His winning pass in the final round was an 11.39 second e.t., overcoming Dick Housey's 11.37 with a holeshot.

Jenkins couldn't agree on terms with Chrysler for 1966, so he decided to run a Chevy independently by making his own Chevy engine package. Without factory support, Jenkins developed his first Grumpy's Toy, a 327 cubic inch / 350 horsepower Chevy II. When he found the compact car was to be placed in the same class as the 426 ci/425 horsepower hemi Dodge and Plymouth muscle cars, he commented it "looked like a pretty good gimmick at the time". The lower displacement engine in the smaller car, hence lighter minimum weight, enabled it to outrun the larger-engined but heavier cars. He set a class record with an 11.66 second pass. He was added to Chevrolet's team in 1967. He became known as the premiere normally aspirated drag race engine builder after his Super Stock victory at the 1967 Nationals. He entered Pro Stock when NHRA started it in 1970, and won the first two events of the year (the Winternationals and Gatornationals) in a 1968 Chevrolet Camaro, ultimately taking the national title. His first car built specifically for Pro Stock, a 1970½ Camaro, would be the first of the class to make the cover of Hot Rod (their July 1970 issue).

Jenkins went winless in 1971. NHRA changed the 1972 rules to allow drivers with a small block wedge engine to run a lighter car. Jenkins used a small block-based 331 cu in (5.4 L) in a Chevrolet Vega fitted in the class' first tube chassis, which debuted at the 1972 Winternationals. He had a subpar 9.90 second pass in the untested Vega, qualifying 17th of the 32 entries at the season-opening event. After tuning the chassis, the car clocked low-9.6 second passes on race day and Jenkins won the event. Jenkins used the car to win five of the first eight events of the season (some of them regionals) and six of eight Nationals. Jenkins earned a total of $250,000 that year, including event and manufacturer support. He matched Wilt Chamberlain as the professional athlete with the highest salary in the United States. That year he was featured in Time magazine, the first drag racer to experience mainstream national coverage.

In 1973, following an NHRA rule change to allow records to be set at any national meet, Jenkins drove his Vega to Pro Stock's first official record, a 148.76 mph (239.41 km/h) pass, at the Winternationals; "Dyno Don" Nicholson set the e.t. record with a 9.33.

Jenkins built a Vega in 1974 (dubbed Grumpy's Toy XI) that had several firsts which impacted future drag racing cars, including the first dry sump oiling system and a MacPherson strut front suspension. This car would give him thirteen wins in Pro Stock that year.

== Car owner and engine builder ==
Jenkins retired as a driver, hiring Larry Lombardo and Ken Dondero to drive his cars so that he could concentrate on research and development. Lombardo replaced Jenkins in the driver's seat for the second race of the 1976 season in NHRA. Lombardo won that season's NHRA Winston Pro Stock championship despite the late start. Dondero won the AHRA title. Lombardo raced for Jenkins until 1979, finishing third in 1977 points, second in 1978, and seventh in 1979. Jenkins cut down the team's match races in the early 1980s until his final season as a team owner in 1983. Joe Lepone won the 1985 Winternationals with a Jenkins Pro Stock engine. Grumpy's main focus was on Comp engines, which were used by a large client list, including national event winners Garley Daniels, Steve Johns, and Bob Kaiser. He led development of GM's new splay-valved cylinder heads for the Chevrolet small block V8 engines, utilized in the new Pro Stock Truck category in 1998. He fitted the splay-valve heads in a 358 cu in (5.87 L) engine, used by Larry Kopp to win the 1998 Winston drag championship, and by 1998 national event winners Tim Freeman, Brad Jeter, Johns, Mark Osborne, Scott Perin, and Don Smith. Jenkins-built engines continue to be used. A Jenkins powerplant was used by Dave Connolly in his title-contending Pro Stock Cobalt to win the 2005 Winternationals and briefly placed Connolly in the POWERade points lead. In 2006, two-time Pro Stock champion Jim Yates announced a testing program with a Jenkins motor in his 2005 Pontiac GTO.

Jenkins also worked on some NASCAR engines. He built the engine Donnie Allison used to take the pole position in the 1975 Daytona 500. Mike Swaim used a Jenkins motor to take the pole for the 1987 Busch Series race at Daytona.

== Halls of Fame / Awards ==
- Jenkins was inducted in the International Motorsports Hall of Fame in 2008.
- He was inducted in the Motorsports Hall of Fame of America (1996)
- Don Garlits International Drag Racing Hall of Fame (1993).
- In 2001, he was ranked eighth on NHRA's Top 50 Drivers of all-time. The American Auto Racing Writers & Broadcasters Association named him to their All-America Team in 1972, and he was awarded Chevrolet's of Performance in 1984.
- Jenkins was selected 21 times to the Car Craft all-star drag racing team including winning the "Man of the Year" and "Ollie Award".

== Personal life ==
Jenkins married Alexandra Newman and the union produced daughter Susan Jenkins before their divorce. He married Polly Wood and they had a son named William and a daughter named Dani-El.

== Death ==
Jenkins died in 2012 of heart failure in Paoli, Pennsylvania.

== Book ==
- The Chevrolet Racing Engine (April 1977) ISBN 978-0-931472-01-5
- Grumpys Toys - The Authorized History of Grumpy Jenkins Cars (Jan. 2011) ISBN 978-1-934709-27-6
