= Pro stock =

Competition class in drag racing

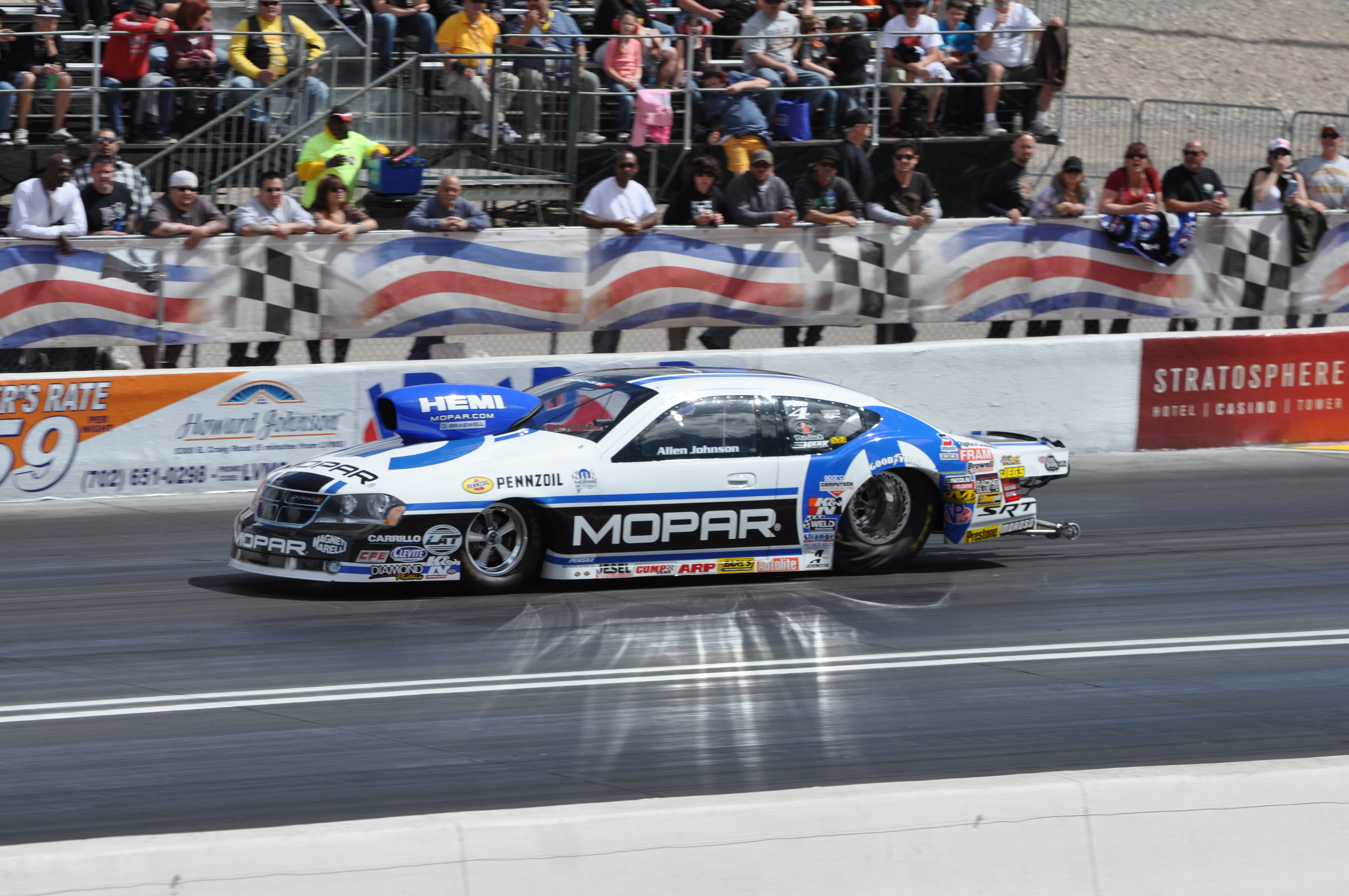
Allen Johnson's Mopar Dodge Avenger Pro Stock

Pro stock is a class of drag racing featuring "factory hot rods". The class is often described as "all motor", due to the cars not using any form of forced induction such as turbocharging or supercharging, or other enhancements, like nitrous oxide, along with regulations governing the modifications allowed to the engines and the types of bodies used.

== History ==
The National Hot Rod Association pro stock class emerged from the production-based super stock in 1970 with a more liberal set of rules and an absence of handicaps. Rules initially favored big block V8s with Chrysler Hemi engine powered cars winning the world title the first two years. The NHRA attempted to balance the playing field for 1972 and introduced rules allowing for small displacement V8, compact cars carrying favorable weight.

On 1 July 1973, the NHRA required pro stock drivers to have competition licences, just like blown or fuel dragsters and funny cars.

Following a 1973 NHRA rule change to allow records to be set at any national meet, at the 1973 NHRA Winternationals, "Dyno Don" Nicholson set the first official pro stock e.t. record with a 9.33, while Bill Jenkins turned in a record 148.76 mph (239.41 km/h) speed; later at the same event, Nicholson made a 9.01 second/150.50 mph (242.21 km/h) pass, breaking both his and Jenkins' records.

Over the 1974 and 1975 seasons, Bob Glidden became the first driver to win two pro stock championships.

In 1982, the NHRA did away with the weight break system and implemented a 2,350 pound minimum weight, 500 cubic inch maximum rule across the board, due to the popularity of the Mountain Motor IHRA pro stock cars, which have unlimited displacements.

Lee Shepherd won the second of four championships in a row in 1983, the year he also won IHRA's title, making him the first driver ever to do so; he repeated the feat in 1984.

In 2016, the NHRA implemented a major overhaul to the engine formula. Hood scoops and double four-barrel carburetors were eliminated and replaced by electronic fuel injection, an overhaul designed to reflect modern automotive trends, as all automobiles being produced for sale in North America have used electronic fuel injection for over 20 years.

== Pro stock today ==
=== Engine ===
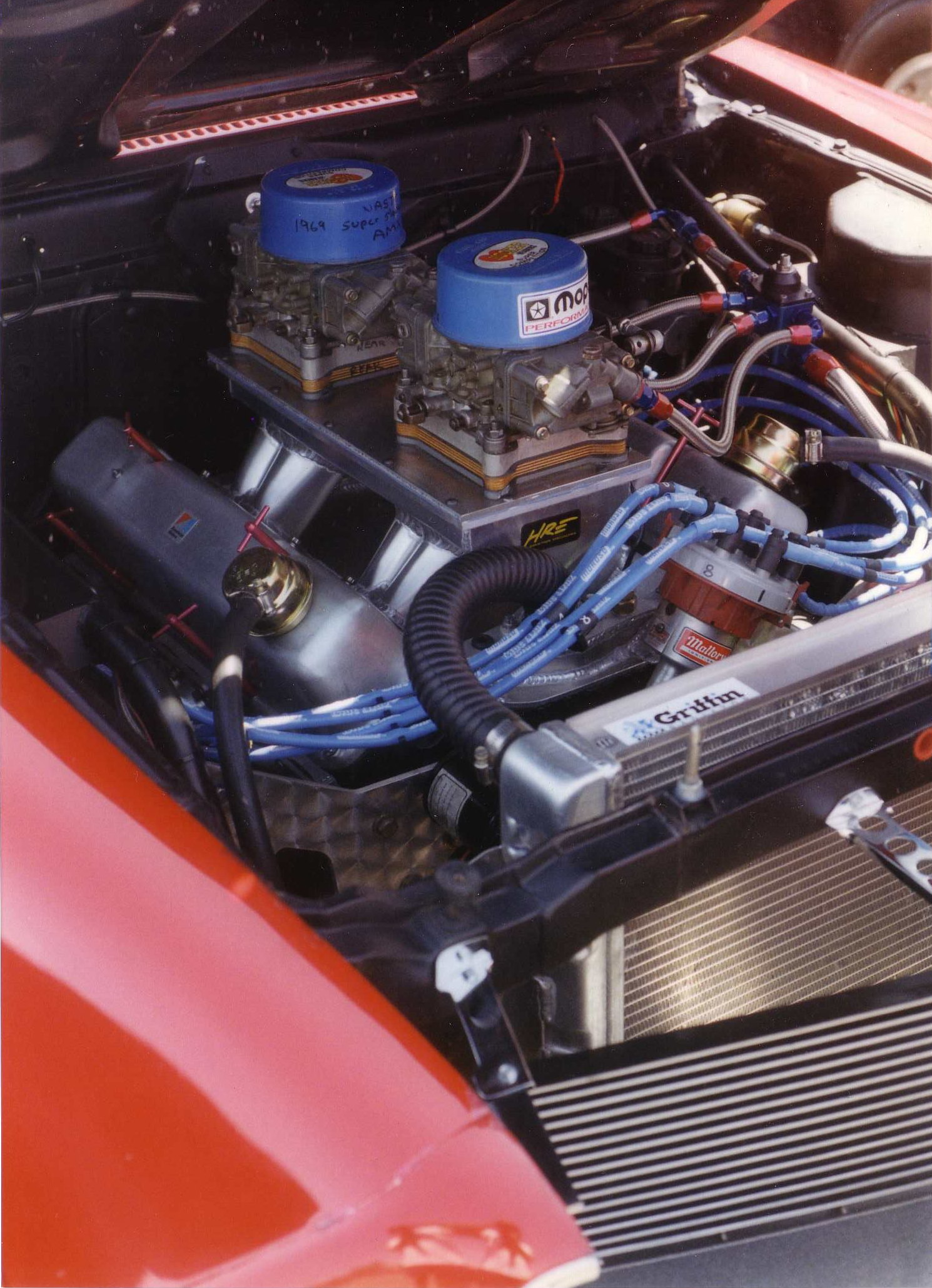
Dual 4-barrel carburetors on a "tunnel ram" intake manifold

- Except in the NHRA 500 ci formula (starting in 2018), the engine must be manufactured by the same company as the car body.
- All raw components must be available to anyone for general public purchase. Engine blocks and cylinder heads are often provided in a "raw" condition with only approximate dimensions and rough machining. Each team will continue to machine and modify the part to their own standards.
- NHRA pro stock engines are restricted to a maximum 500 cu in (8.2 L) single-camshaft, 90-degree V8.
  - Several bodies have different rules. "Mountain Motors", run by the PDRA (eighth-mile) and at selected NHRA events in 2019, do not have a 500-cubic inch rule, with some engines exceeding 800 cu in (13.1 L), to upwards of 1,000 cu in (16.4 L). The NHRA limits engine displacement in Mountain Motor categories to 843 cu in (13.8 L).
  - The Australian National Drag Racing Association and IHRA have a 400 cu in (6.6 L) maximum displacement engine limit.
- Depending on sanctioning body and class, engines may either be four-barrel carburetors or throttle body electronic fuel injection and must be a naturally aspirated intake system.
  - Those that use two four-barrel carburetors may allow them to be "split" (i.e. sawn in half) so that each of the halves can be more accurately positioned over the slightly staggered intake runners. The intake manifold and heads are open to modification. The most effective intake manifold configuration has continued to be the "tunnel ram" for nearly 40 years. The carburetors are raised above the engine; the length and configuration of the intake passages ("runners") is critical to horsepower output. The tall intake manifolds necessitate the large hood scoop that is a signature of the pro stock class. (The hood scoop is illegal in the NHRA because of EFI)
  - The NHRA formula (starting in 2016) requires, and the PDRA extreme pro stock permits, cars to use electronically controlled throttle body fuel injection systems.
  - In the NHRA, an electronic control unit (ECU) will be implemented on the EFI systems, including a 10,500 RPM limit, with modern engines approaching 12,000 RPM.

The rules that exclude forced induction of any sort, plus allowing head modifications, have resulted in pro stock heads being the most sophisticated in any drag racing category, with valve lifts in the 1 inch region.

Modern pro stock engines generally produce around 2.5 hp/in^{3} (114 kW/L), and make upwards of 1,500 hp while being naturally aspirated.

A complete NHRA pro stock engine can cost upwards of $100,000.

=== Drivetrain ===
- Pro stock clutches utilize multiple discs. These must be serviced after every run to maintain critical tolerances that can mean the difference between a good run or severe tire shake.
- Since 1973, the most popular transmission was the Lenco planetary design, first used as a four-speed and now as a five-speed. Although the five-speed unit (usually air-shifted) is still used in ADRL and Mountain Motor Pro Stock Association and in air-shifted three-speed units in pro modified, NHRA pro stocks utilize Liberty or G-Force five-speed clutchless manual transmissions.

=== Body ===
- NHRA pro stock racers use NHRA-approved carbon fiber bodies. Windows are manufactured from polycarbonate.
- Some have complained that the "stock" portion of "pro stock" is not really all that accurate anymore, because so little, if any, of the race cars' bodies have their origins in the respective manufacturers' factories.

=== Chassis ===
- Pro stock chassis are welded 4130 chrome-molybdenum alloy steel tubing, with an integrated "funny-car style" cage around the driver that, combined with the safety restraints and helmet produce a very rigid and safe driving environment that was brought upon after a violent rollover crash suffered by Bob Glidden during the 1986 Commerce, GA, round.

=== Suspension ===
- Pro stock cars are required to use automotive-type suspension systems.
- Since the 1970s, front suspensions have utilized MacPherson struts with control arms; for rear suspensions, the design of choice is a four-link suspension with coil over shock absorbers connected to a fixed rear axle.
- Both the front and rear shock absorbers can be adjusted automatically during the run by air circuits that are controlled by an electronic control unit.

=== Brakes ===
- The primary means of slowing the cars from their top speeds of around 213 mph are the drogue parachutes. As cars have exceeded the 200 MPH barrier, two parachutes are required as NHRA mandates twin parachutes when speeds exceed that.
- The chutes utilize either springs or compressed air launchers to get the chutes into the air as fast as possible and to avoid the dead air behind the car.
- Four-wheel disc brakes made by aftermarket manufacturers are also used.
- The brakes have single calipers on the front and double calipers on the rear with carbon fiber rotors.

=== Fuel ===
- The factory hot rods may use only racing fuel (octane rating: 118), which is tested and certified by chemical analysis at events with the sanctioning body's approval.
  - Some organisations will mandate a specification fuel.
- Pro stock fuel systems flow the gasoline at 7.5 US gallons per minute (0.5 L/s).

In addition to all of these specifications, each car must:

- Weigh a minimum of 2,350 pounds (1,066 kg), including driver (2,450 pounds for Mountain Motor formula cars)
- In the late 1980s and into the 1990s, car sizes increased as mid-size family sedans had become the car of choice, but cars shrank by the 2000s (decade) as compact cars, banking off the popularity then of the sport compact class, became the trend, as General Motors and Daimler (then owning the Dodge brand) began using compact cars (similar to pro RWD except for the engine). However, that the push back to pony cars and mid-size family sedans became the choice again, as Ford uses a "pony car" and Dodge and Chevrolet began using mid-size family sedans. The 2013 legal cars are the Chevrolet Camaro, Dodge Avenger, and Ford Mustang. For 2014, Fiat teams are transitioning to the Dodge Dart.
- Rear spoilers cannot be longer than 13 inches (330 mm), measured from the body-line-to-spoiler transition point to the tip.
- Complete stock headlights, parking lights and taillights must be retained in the original factory location.

This makes for some incredibly tight racing; the front runners in the class can reach speeds over 213 miles per hour (343 km/h) in 6.47 seconds (approx). The qualifications rounds are separated by less than a tenth of a second across all competitors. In a particularly tight qualifying roster, the difference from No. 1 to the final No. 16 qualifier may be only .05 seconds.

Mountain Motor cars, because of their massive, 800+ cubic inch, mountain motors, dip into the 6.30s at almost 220 miles per hour (354 km/h). At the 2019 NHRA Houston Raceway Park race, where the Mountain Motor formula replaced the NHRA formula, the fastest car reached 6.233 seconds.

== NHRA pro stock champions (1970–present) ==
- 1970 - Ronnie Sox
- 1971 - Mike Fons
- 1972 - Bill Jenkins
- 1973 - Wayne Gapp
- 1974 - Bob Glidden
- 1975 - Bob Glidden
- 1976 - Larry Lombardo
- 1977 - Don Nicholson
- 1978 - Bob Glidden
- 1979 - Bob Glidden
- 1980 - Bob Glidden
- 1981 - Lee Shepherd
- 1982 - Lee Shepherd
- 1983 - Lee Shepherd
- 1984 - Lee Shepherd
- 1985 - Bob Glidden
- 1986 - Bob Glidden
- 1987 - Bob Glidden
- 1988 - Bob Glidden
- 1989 - Bob Glidden
- 1990 - Darrell Alderman
- 1991 - Darrell Alderman
- 1992 - Warren Johnson
- 1993 - Warren Johnson
- 1994 - Darrell Alderman
- 1995 - Warren Johnson
- 1996 - Jim Yates
- 1997 - Jim Yates
- 1998 - Warren Johnson
- 1999 - Warren Johnson
- 2000 - Jeg Coughlin, Jr.
- 2001 - Warren Johnson
- 2002 - Jeg Coughlin
- 2003 - Greg Anderson
- 2004 - Greg Anderson
- 2005 - Greg Anderson
- 2006 - Jason Line
- 2007 - Jeg Coughlin
- 2008 - Jeg Coughlin
- 2009 - Mike Edwards
- 2010 - Greg Anderson
- 2011 - Jason Line
- 2012 - Allen Johnson
- 2013 - Jeg Coughlin
- 2014 - Erica Enders
- 2015 - Erica Enders
- 2016 - Jason Line
- 2017 - Bo Butner
- 2018 - Tanner Gray
- 2019 - Erica Enders
- 2020 - Erica Enders
- 2021 - Greg Anderson
- 2022 - Erica Enders
- 2023 - Erica Enders
- 2024 - Greg Anderson
- 2025 - Dallas Glenn

The most championships for a driver in pro stock is 10-time champion Bob Glidden. During the 1978 and 1979 seasons when he all but shut out his competition, Glidden advanced to 18 of the 19 final rounds, winning 14 times. Nine of those wins came in a row, widely considered by many to be one of the most impressive winning streaks in the history of the sport. The driver with the most wins in a single season is six-time champion Greg Anderson, who won 15 of 23 events en route to his 2004 championship.

== Most NHRA pro stock wins ==
Driver	Wins
Greg Anderson	116
Warren Johnson	97
Bob Glidden	85
Jeg Coughlin	69
Jason Line	51
Erica Enders	50
Mike Edwards	40
Kurt Johnson	40
Darrell Alderman	28
Dallas Glenn	28
Allen Johnson	27
Dave Connolly	26
Lee Shepherd	26
Jim Yates	25
Aaron Stanfield	17
Bruce Allen	16
Vincent Nobile	13
Tanner Gray	13
Larry Morgan	12
Frank Iaconio	11
Bill Jenkins	11
James E. Butner III	11
Matt Hartford	11
Scott Geoffrion	9
Ronnie Sox	9
Greg Stanfield	8
Jerry Eckman	8
Butch Leal	8
Chris McGaha	7
Drew Skillman	7
Ron Krisher	7
Troy Coughlin	6
Richie Stevens Jr.	6
Tom Martino	6
Mark Pawuk	6
Larry Lombardo	6
Don Nicholson	6
Wayne Gapp	6
Wally Booth	6
Deric Kramer	5
Shane Gray	5
Mark Osbourne	4
Vieri Gaines	4
Alex Laughlin	3
Rodger Brogdon	3
Steve Schmidt	3
Don Beverley	3
Tony Christian	3
George Marnell	2
Rickie Smith	2
Don Carlton	2
Cory Reed	1
Camrie Caruso	1
Kyle Koretsky	1
Jimmy Alund	1
Aaron Strong	1
Rickie Jones	1
Johnathan Gray	1
Justin Humphreys	1
Mike Thomas	1
Chuck Harris	1
Kenny Delco	1
Joe Lepone Jr.	1
Don Campanello	1
Harry Scribner	1
Morris Johnson Jr.	1
Randy Humphrey	1
Herb McCandless	1
Dick Landy	1
Ray Allen	1
Mike Fons	1
Richie Zul	1

== See also ==
- Pro Stock Motorcycle
