= Warren Johnson =

NHRA drag racing driver

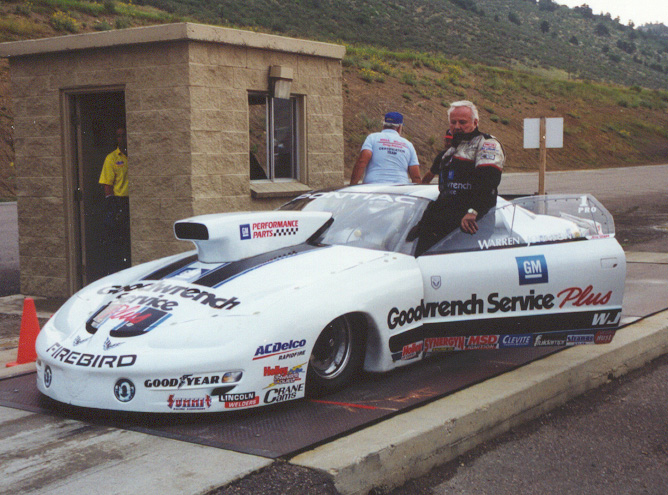
- Johnson getting into his car on a scale
- Born: July 7, 1943 (age 83) Virginia, Minnesota, U.S.

Pro Stock
- Years active: 1976 - 2013
- Teams: Warren Johnson Motorsports
- Wins: 97 in 151 final rounds
- Poles: 138
- Fastest laps: 6.561 (ET) 211.26 (MPH)
- Best finish: 1st (6 times) in 1992 1993 1995 1998 1999 2001

Awards
- International Motorsports Hall of Fame (2007), Motorsports Hall of Fame of America (2015)

Warren Johnson (born July 7, 1943 in Virginia, Minnesota) is an American former NHRA drag racing driver. He is the driver with the second most wins in pro stock with 97 career wins and six world championships.

== Career ==
In 1995, Johnson had one of the biggest comebacks in NHRA history. After the alleged season ending vandalism of the cars driven by Darrell Alderman and Scott Geoffrion, Johnson started gaining points, and had gained over 500 points with the season half completed to clinch the championship that year.

In 1997, Johnson became the first NHRA Pro Stock driver to exceed 200 mph with a pass of 200.13 mph at Richmond, Virginia. He became the first Pro Stock driver to make a sub-6.9-second pass with a 6.894-second run at Richmond, Va. In 2006, Johnson reached his 500th career race.

On May 2, 2010, at age 66, Johnson became the oldest professional winner in NHRA history, as he won the AAA Midwest Nationals in Madison Illinois.

As of May 2010, he won the National Hot Rod Association's Pro Stock championship in six seasons and 97 NHRA national events. Johnson is also a two time IHRA champion in the Mountain Motor Pro Stock division.

== Awards ==
- In 2001, a panel ranked Johnson seventh in the National Hot Rod Association Top 50 Drivers, 1951–2000.
- Johnson was inducted in the International Motorsports Hall of Fame in 2007.
- In 2015, Johnson was inducted in the Motorsports Hall of Fame of America.
