= National Hot Rod Association =

North American drag auto racing organization

- Sport: Drag racing
- Jurisdiction: North America
- Abbreviation: NHRA
- Founded: May 1951; 75 years ago
- Headquarters: San Dimas, California; Brownsburg, Indiana, U.S.
- President: Glen Cromwell
- Chairman: Dallas Gardner

Official website
- nhra.com

The National Hot Rod Association (NHRA) is a governing body which sets rules in drag racing and hosts events all over the United States and Canada. With over 40,000 drivers in its rosters, the NHRA claims to be the largest motorsport sanctioning body in the world.

The association was founded by Wally Parks in 1951 in California to provide a governing body to organize and promote the sport of drag racing. NHRA's first Nationals was held in 1955, in Great Bend, Kansas. The NHRA Mission Foods Drag Racing Series, the national event series which comprises 24 races each year, is the premier series in drag racing that brings together the best drag racers from across North America and the world. The NHRA U.S. Nationals are now held at Lucas Oil Raceway in Brownsburg, Indiana and are officially called the U.S. Nationals. Winners of national events are awarded a trophy statue in honor of founder Wally Parks. The trophy is commonly referred to by its nickname, "The Wally".

== History ==
Wally Parks, editor of Hot Rod magazine and a dry lakes racer himself, began the National Hot Rod Association to promote "safety, sportsmanship, and fellowship" among hot rodders. The association gained about 25,000 members in its first year; within six years, it had more than 57,000 members.

Hot Rod magazine and NHRA worked together to convince the general public and especially the police that there was a difference between hot-rodders and reckless street racers, sometimes known as "shot rodders". They encouraged the involvement of adults, such as auto shop teachers and garage owners. The NHRA's efforts to defend the image of the hot-rodder included a series of short films such as The Cool Hot Rod (1953) in which a delinquent teen learns that "a reckless kid in an old junker is not a hot-rodder at all. He's a square."

NHRA initiated the 1954 "Drag Safari", a nationwide tour to encourage organized drag racing with an emphasis on safety. Sponsored by Mobil Oil, the Safari crew would meet with law enforcement and local city officials at each stop to explain their program, involve local car clubs, set up sites, and run drag races. Drag Safari would lead to the 1955 US Nationals for drag racing.

Due to the coronavirus pandemic in the United States, the NHRA cancelled its 2020 and 2021 editions of the Drag Racing Series at the Virginia Motorsports Park. Regular scheduling resumed in 2022, with the events taking place in May of that year.

Currently, there are two headquarters offices, one in San Dimas, California, and the other in Brownsburg, Indiana at Lucas Oil Indianapolis Raceway Park. The Mission Foods Drag Racing Series offices are held in Brownsburg.

The NHRA is celebrating its 75th anniversary in 2026. A special NHRA 75th anniversary Diamond Wally is only be rewarded to winners in 2026.

== Series ==
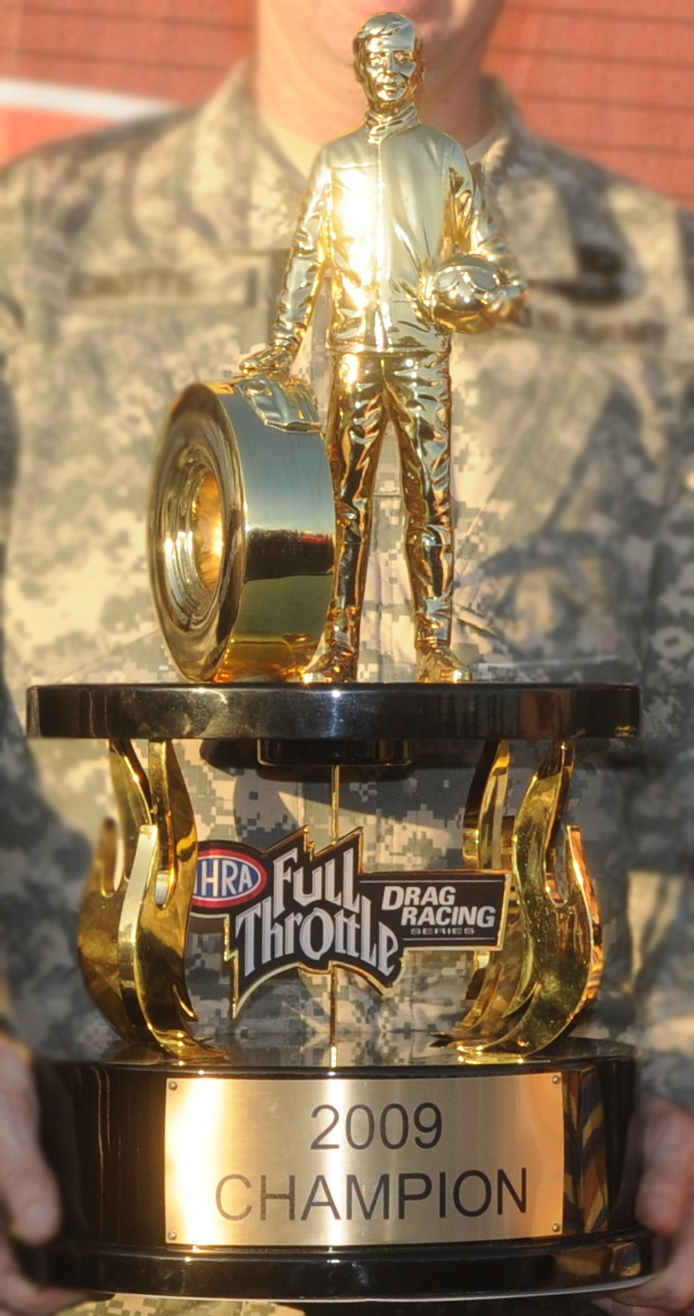
2009 Top Fuel Championship trophy

=== NHRA Championship Drag Racing Series ===
The NHRA Mission Foods Drag Racing Series is the top division of the NHRA. It consists of four professional classes:

- Top Fuel Dragster
- Funny Car
- Pro Stock
- Pro Stock Motorcycle

==== Champions ====
- List of NHRA champions

=== NHRA Sportsman Drag Racing Series ===
There are more than a dozen Sportsman Classes. The classes contested at NHRA Divisional races include Snowmobile, Motorcycle Classes, Super Street, Super Gas, Stock Eliminator, Super Stock, Competition Eliminator, Super Comp, Top Sportsman, Top Dragster, Top Alcohol Funny Car, and Top Alcohol Dragster. All classes except Snowmobile and some Sportsman motorcycle classes are regularly contested at NHRA national events.

NHRA promotes mainly the Professional classes at national events; however, the majority of its participants are Sportsman Racers. Sportsman-class racers must be dues-paying members of NHRA before they are allowed to enter and participate in any NHRA event.

Included in these sportsman events are the Lucas Oil Drag Racing Series, the Summit Racing Equipment Racing Series and the NHRA Jr. Drag Racing League.

The NHRA Sportsman Drag Racing Series originally consisted of seven divisions: Northeast, Southeast, North Central, South Central, West Central, Northwest, and Pacific. Starting in 2012, the Top Alcohol Dragster and Top Alcohol Funny Car classes competed in four regions: East, North Central, Central and West.

==== Champions ====
Year	Top Alcohol Dragster
1981	Brian Raymer
1982	Don Woosley
1983	Darrell Gwynn
1984	Bill Walsh
1985	Bill Walsh
1986	Bill Walsh
1987	Denny Lucas
1988	Mike Troxel
1989	Tom Conway
1990	Blaine Johnson
1991	Blaine Johnson
1992	Blaine Johnson
1993	Blaine Johnson
1994	Tom Conway
1995	Jay Payne
1996	Bobby Taylor
1997	Rick Santos
1998	Rick Santos
1999	Rick Santos
2000	Rick Santos
2001	Rick Santos
2002	Arthur Gallant
2003	Alan Bradshaw
2004	Mitch Myers
2005	Steve Torrence
2006	Bill Reichert
2007	Bill Reichert
2008	Bill Reichert
2009	Bill Reichert
2010	Bill Reichert
2011	Duane Shields
2012	Jim Whiteley
2013	Jim Whiteley
2014	Chris Demke
2015	Joey Severance
2016	Joey Severance
2017	Joey Severance
2018	Joey Severance
2019	Megan Meyer
2020	Megan Meyer
2021	Rachel Meyer
2022	Joey Severance
2023	Julie Nataas
2024	Shawn Cowie
2025	Shawn Cowie

Year	Top Alcohol Funny Car
1981	Frank Manzo
1982	Bob Gottschalk
1983	Fred Mandoline
1984	Brad Anderson
1985	Brad Anderson
1986	Frank Manzo
1987	Pat Austin
1988	Pat Austin
1989	Brad Anderson
1990	Pat Austin
1991	Pat Austin
1992	Bob Newberry
1993	Randy Anderson
1994	Randy Anderson
1995	Joe Pendland
1996	Tony Bartone
1997	Frank Manzo
1998	Frank Manzo
1999	Frank Manzo
2000	Frank Manzo
2001	Frank Manzo
2002	Frank Manzo
2003	Frank Manzo
2004	Cy Chesterman
2005	Bob Newberry
2006	Frank Manzo
2007	Frank Manzo
2008	Frank Manzo
2009	Frank Manzo
2010	Frank Manzo
2011	Frank Manzo
2012	Frank Manzo
2013	Frank Manzo
2014	Steve Harker
2015	Jonnie Lindberg
2016	Jonnie Lindberg
2017	Shane Westerfield
2018	Sean Bellemeur
2019	Sean Bellemeur
2020	Doug Gordon
2021	Sean Bellemeur
2022	Doug Gordon
2023	Doug Gordon
2024	Sean Bellemeur

Year	Comp Eliminator
1981	Jeff Cunningham
1982	Norwin Palmer
1983	Coleman Roddy
1984	Coleman Roddy
1985	Bill Maropulos
1986	Vinny Barone
1987	Bill Maropulos
1988	Garley Daniels
1989	Bob Kaiser
1990	David Rampy
1991	David Nickens
1992	Steve Johns
1993	Bill Maropulos
1994	Jeff Krug
1995	Sal Biondo
1996	Bo Nickens
1997	Andy Manna Jr.
1998	Bob Andrews
1999	Andy Manna Jr.
2000	Jerry Arnold
2001	Don Stratton
2002	Mike Saye
2003	Dean Carter
2004	Dean Carter
2005	Jeff Taylor
2006	Bo Butner
2007	Frank Aragona Jr.
2008	Dan Fletcher
2009	Bruno Massel
2010	Al Ackerman
2011	Lou Ficco
2012	Bruno Massel
2013	Alan Ellis
2014	David Rampy
2015	Craig Bourgeois
2016	Doug Doll Jr.
2017	David Rampy
2018	Frank Aragona Jr.
2019	Frank Aragona Jr.
2020	Craig Bourgeois
2021	Bruno Massel
2022	Ryan Priddy

Year	Super-Stock
1981	Charlie Taylor
1982	Keith Lynch
1983	Keith Lynch
1984	Chuck Gallagher
1985	Dave Boertman
1986	Delmer Wood
1987	Jim Boburka
1988	Jeff Taylor
1989	Jim Boburka
1990	Greg Stanfield
1991	Jeff Taylor
1992	Greg Stanfield
1993	Greg Stanfield
1994	Greg Stanfield
1995	Mike Saye
1996	Peter Biondo
1997	Jimmy DeFrank
1998	Dan Fletcher
1999	Jimmy DeFrank
2000	Peter Biondo
2001	Dan Fletcher
2002	Anthony Bertozzi
2003	Peter Biondo
2004	Larry Stewart
2005	Hugh Meeks
2006	Peter Biondo
2007	Darren Smith
2008	Ricky Decker
2009	Jimmy DeFrank
2010	Ryan McClanahan
2011	Jackie Alley
2012	Jimmy DeFrank
2013	Byron Worner
2014	Peter Biondo
2015	Justin Lamb
2016	Jimmy DeFrank
2017	Justin Lamb
2018	Justin Lamb
2019	Vic Penrod
2020	Bryan Worner
2021	Greg Stanfield
2022	Peter D`Agnolo

Year	Stock
1981	Jeff Taylor
1982	Tex Miller
1983	Jim Hughes
1984	Alan Peters
1985	Tim Ekstrand
1986	Al Corda
1987	Jim Waldo
1988	Sammy Pizzolato
1989	Jim Hughes
1990	Don Keen
1991	John Calvert
1992	Chad Guilford
1993	Jason Line
1994	Harvey Emmons III
1995	Chuck Rayburn
1996	Scotty Richardson
1997	Al Corda
1998	Jeff Hefler
1999	Don Little
2000	Edmond Richardson
2001	Kevin Helms
2002	Kevin Helms
2003	Kevin Helms
2004	Lee Zane
2005	Peter Biondo
2006	Randy Wilkes
2007	Michael Iacono
2008	Lee Zane
2009	Edmond Richardson
2010	Brad Burton
2011	Joseph Santangelo
2012	Brad Burton
2013	Justin Lamb
2014	Austin Williams
2015	Kevin Helms
2016	Jeff Strickland
2017	Justin Lamb
2018	Brian McClanahan
2019	Allison Doll
2020	Jody Lang
2021	Jerry Emmons
2022	Jimmy Hidalgo Jr

Sportsman racers with multiple championships

Sportsman racers who have won multiple world championships, with the date of their most recent championship.

Top Alcohol Dragster (TAD)

- 5: Rick Santos (2001), Bill Reichert (2010), Joey Severance (2022)
- 4: Blaine Johnson (1993)
- 3: Bill Walsh (1986)
- 2: Jim Whiteley (2013), Megan Meyer (2020), Shawn Cowie (2025)

Alcohol Funny Car (AFC)

- 17: Frank Manzo (2013)
- 4: Pat Austin (1991)
- 3: Brad Anderson (1989), Sean Bellemeur (2021), Doug Gordon (2023)
- 2: Randy Anderson (1994), Bob Newberry (2005), Jonnie Lindberg (2016)

Competition Eliminator (CE)

- 3: Bill Maropulos (1987), David Rampy (2017), Frank Aragona Jr. (2019), Bruno Massel (2021)
- 2: Coleman Roddy (1984), Andy Manna Jr (1999), Dean Carter (2004)

Super Stock (SS)

- 5: Peter Biondo (2014)
- 4: Jimmy DeFrank (2012), Greg Stanfield (2021)
- 3: Justin Lamb (2018)
- 2: Keith Lynch (1983), Jim Boburka (1989), Jeff Taylor (1991), Dan Fletcher (2001)

Stock

- 4: Kevin Helms (2015)
- 2: Jim Hughes (1989), Al Corda (1997), Lee Zane (2008), Edmond Richardson (2009), Brad Burton (2012), Justin Lamb (2017)

=== National records ===
Class	Date	Track	Driver	Elapsed Time (seconds)
Top Fuel	September 13, 2019	Maple Grove Raceway	Brittany Force	3.623
Funny Car	August 18, 2017	Brainerd International Raceway	Robert Hight	3.793
Pro Stock	March 14, 2022	Gainesville Raceway	Erica Enders	6.450
Pro Stock Motorcycle	October 14, 2023	Texas Motorplex	Gaige Herrera	6.627
Pro Modified	March 14, 2021	Gainesville Raceway	Jose Gonzalez	5.621
Top Alcohol Dragster	September 6, 2020	Indianapolis Raceway Park	Megan Meyer	5.090
Top Alcohol Funny Car	March 17, 2019	Gainesville Raceway	Sean Bellemeur	5.352

NOTE: Top Fuel and Funny Car records are measured in the 1,000 foot (304.8 meter) increment

== National Dragster ==
The NHRA's official publication is National Dragster, founded in 1960 by Wally Parks, who was also its first editor. Distributed to NHRA members as a membership benefit since its first issue, it began as a weekly newsprint newspaper and is now published monthly.

== Venues ==
NHRA has over 100 member tracks across the United States. It currently leases In N Out Pomona Dragstrip, Gainesville Raceway, and Lucas Oil Raceway. It previously owned National Trail Raceway and Atlanta Dragway.

== Safety ==
The NHRA mandates numerous safety devices and procedures in all competition events.

A five-point safety harness is required for all vehicles. It holds the driver securely in the seat and is equipped with a quick-release latch which can be released in less than a second should the driver need to leave the car due to fire or explosions.

Fire suits are required for all drivers in the alcohol and nitromethane fuel classes and the faster gasoline classes. These suits are full body coveralls and made with seven layers of Nomex fabric, which makes them resistant to fire. The required suit includes Nomex gloves, foot socks, and head sock.

Another NASCAR transplant, which was brought into use after the death of Fireball Roberts, was the fuel cell. This bladder is placed into the fuel tanks of non-nitromethane-fueled vehicles to prevent fuel leaks and explosions.

Third is the use of the HANS device. This device limits the movement of the head and neck in the event of an impact.

Fourth is the titanium shield that must be placed behind the head of all Dragsters and Funny Cars down to the Alcohol ranks. This is to prevent any debris from entering the cockpit and becoming a missile hazard to the driver after the death of Top Fuel racer Darrell Russell.

Fifth is the on-board fire extinguishing system that is required. These systems are directed onto the engine itself and are activated instantly when the engine catches fire, reducing the chance for the car to completely catch fire and endanger the driver. The driver also has a manual activation control available. This has been in place on all cars since 1983, when an engine explosion and fire came very close to killing then-Funny Car driver Mike Dunn. All enclosed body cars must have a five-inch circular opening that will accept the nozzle of a fire extinguisher triggered by safety personnel. All vehicles must have a clearly marked fuel pump cut-off switch on a rear panel, accessible to safety crews.

Sixth is the roof escape hatch that is in place on all Funny Cars since the founding of the division in the early 1970s. This device allows Funny Car drivers a safe means of exit during an engine fire rather than falling out of the car between the frame and fiberglass body, and possibly running the risk of being run over by the rear tires.

Seventh are the long bars at the rear end of all cars, also known as "wheelie bars". These long struts prevent the car from flipping over during the launch phase.

To prevent debris, oil, fuel, or coolant from falling on the racing surface, "diapers" under the engine (with a supporting platform) are used to retain liquids and broken parts in the event of a catastrophic engine failure. "Oil-downs" result in substantial fines and the loss of previously earned Championship points (for annual awards). Many cars using the centrifugally-activated "slipper" clutch are now using a retention tube to collect the substantial amount of clutch dust that is produced during each race. The aforementioned recent practices, along with the longstanding requirement for a Kevlar-style retainer blanket over the supercharger, considerably reduce the potential for injury and fire, in addition to assuring a cleaner and safer racing surface, resulting in a dramatic reduction in race delays for track clean-up.

The rear tires of the car, which are called slicks due to the fact that there is no tread on them, are specified with safety considerations in mind. These tires are made from a much harder compound than in previous years so that the tire is resistant to disintegration. This also came about after the death of Russell. The tires are not allowed to be inflated under 7 pounds per square inch (48 kPa) for any race at any time.

All cars capable of attaining 150 miles per hour require braking parachutes. A safety requirement on all Drag cars running 9.99 and quicker in the 1/4 mile is the fireproof engine blanket that surrounds the engine block and contains debris in case of an engine explosion. NHRA rules call for a monetary, points, and time penalty if the car leaks oil during the run. During qualifying, the offending team loses its elapsed time and speed from the run; during a race, the penalty is loss of lane choice unless both teams in the ensuing race committed the violation.

In the wake of Eric Medlen's 2007 death, the roll bars in a Funny Car underwent modifications to further improve safety. They are padded with thick insulation and coated with several layers of Nomex to prevent the padding from catching fire during an engine explosion.

Another facility safety feature is the large sand pit at the end of the track past an area of the track known as the "shutdown area", also known as a "sand trap". This 40-foot-long (12 m) sand pit has been placed to slow or stop a car. In the wake of Scott Kalitta's death at Englishtown, NJ in 2008, the sand traps have been made longer and deeper, going from three feet deep to six feet deep and from 40 feet (12 m) long to 80 feet (24 m) long. Anchors for any arresting netting must be buried underground with no obstructing posts.

Some of the newest safety features deal with the tracks themselves. In the wake of Kalitta's death, there are now heavily padded retaining walls at the end of the sand traps. These walls are able to withstand the impact of a vehicle traveling at well over the usual speed of any division within the NHRA's professional categories. These retaining walls take the place of the old rubber polymer safety nets that were once held up with concrete posts.

Another safety modification was a direct result of Kalitta's death. The NHRA began installing a sensor that constantly checks the car's engine, and should the car backfire at any time during the race, or if the burst panel is blown out by an engine explosion, the fuel pump shuts off and the parachutes are deployed automatically. Although several drivers in the Top Fuel and Funny Car divisions have stated their dislike for the new sensor, they do admit that it should cut down on any fatal crashes similar to Kalitta's. This device was developed by Force, Kenny Bernstein, and Tony Schumacher, along with NHRA racing development, and NHRA track safety. It was implemented at the start of the 2009 season. The sensor is used only in the Funny Car and Top Fuel divisions. Pro Stock doesn't use nitromethane or superchargers in their engines and this presents a much-reduced risk of the massive explosions that can be seen in the nitromethane-fueled cars—and often at their peak speeds.

Prior to the late 1980s, fans could station themselves up to the guardrails so they could be closer to the action. However, in the wake of several rather dramatic accidents on track, where spectators have been injured or killed, fans are no longer allowed within 75 feet (23 m) of the guardrail.

One of the newest safety requirements came after a near-fatal crash at Texas Motorplex in Ennis, Texas, when John Force's car experienced a severe case of tire shake which, coupled with the release of his parachutes, ripped his car cleanly in two directly behind the engine. This frame failure exposed him to severe injury with no body or frame in front of his feet, as the severely damaged vehicle ground to a halt. The rules now prevent the use of hardened chrome moly tubing in the framework construction of any Top Fuel or Funny Car.

The track length for nitromethane-powered vehicles (funny cars and fuel dragsters) has been reduced to 1,000 feet (305 meters), to reduce the likelihood and severity of blower and engine explosions and fires at or above 200 miles per hour. All other classes continue to race a full 1320-foot quarter mile (402 meters) which has been the original distance established by the NHRA in the 1950s.

The 2010 season brought a new safety device to Top Fuel classes. Should the driver be rendered unable to perform the normal shutdown sequence at the conclusion of a run, a pair of redundant transmitters, placed 400 feet (120 m) and 600 feet (180 m) past the finish line, will signal an on-board receiver to automatically shut off ignition power and fuel to the engine and deploy the parachutes. The transmitters are designed and placed so as to avoid inadvertent triggering of the automated shutoffs. These transmitters and the receivers that are placed on all cars were designed by NHRA's Track Safety Committee and constructed by Electrimotion, and are a direct result of Kalitta's death.

=== Safety Safari ===
Within the safety requirements, there is also a full crew of safety personnel, called the Safety Safari, whose job is to attend to any fires, clean up the track of debris after an accident on the track, and attend to the drivers prior to the arrival of any medical personnel. The Safety Safari has been in place since the late 1960s, after a rash of on-track accidents caused several promising drivers to retire early. Since that time the chance of fatal injuries has been decreased but not eliminated. There is also a full staff of EMTs on hand at any event on the schedule at any given time. These EMTs are usually from the city or county the track is located in, and are compensated by the NHRA for their time and efforts. Aeromedical services are also on hand at the track for airlifting severely injured persons to local hospitals or trauma centers if necessary.

The original "Drag Safari" began their tour across America in 1954. Included were four original members: Bud Coons, Bud Evans, Eric Rickman and Chic Cannon.

=== Fatalities ===
Although there are several safety procedures in place to prevent fatal accidents, no amount of safety can completely prevent fatalities on the track. These are notable incidents that took place at NHRA national events or in pre or post race testing after national events.

Name	Location	Year
"Sneaky" Pete Robinson	Auto Club Raceway at Pomona	1971
John Hagen	Brainerd International Raceway	1983
Blaine Johnson	Indianapolis Raceway Park	1996
Elmer Trett	Indianapolis Raceway Park	1996
Darrell Russell	Gateway International Raceway	2004
Eric Medlen	Gainesville Raceway	2007
Scott Kalitta	Englishtown, NJ	2008
Neal Parker	Englishtown, NJ	2010
Mark Niver	Pacific Raceways	2010

== See also ==
- Wally Parks NHRA Motorsports Museum
- International Hot Rod Association
- National Electric Drag Racing Association
- United States Hot Rod Association
- Santa Ana Drags
- Pro Street
