= Gatornationals =

Annual race

National Hot Rod Association
- Venue: Gainesville Raceway
- Location: Gainesville, Florida, U.S. 29°45′29.00″N 82°16′29.00″W
- Corporate sponsor: Amalie Oil Company
- First race: 1970

Circuit information
- Length: 1/4 mi (0.40 km)

The Gatornationals is a drag racing event in the NHRA Mission Foods Drag Racing Series that has been held annually each March at Gainesville Raceway in Gainesville, Florida since 1970.

The Gatornationals was the site of the first 260-mph Top Fuel and Funny Car runs in 1984, achieved by Joe Amato and Kenny Bernstein, respectively. It also hosted the first 270-mph and 300-mph Top Fuel passes, completed by Don Garlits in 1986 and Kenny Bernstein in 1992, respectively. The track features a 675-foot concrete launchpad, which is one of the longest on the tour.

As of 2014, the Gatornationals is the fourth-oldest active event on the NHRA Professional tour, behind the Winternationals, U.S. Nationals, and the NHRA Finals. The event is currently sponsored by the Amalie Oil Company. Previous sponsors have included the Ford Motor Company and Stanley Black & Decker.

Due to the COVID-19 pandemic in 2020, some sportsman races were held behind closed doors, while the national event and top sportsman classes were postponed to September and held with spectators. In 2021, the race became the season opener for all classes, also as a result of the pandemic. The Gatornationals has remained the season opener since 2023, due to logistical changes related to the NFL season schedule that caused the Winternationals to be moved later in the year.

== Winners ==
Year	Top Fuel	Funny Car	Pro Stock	Pro Stock Motorcycle
1970	Dave Chenevert	Leonard Hughes	Bill Jenkins	
1971	Jimmy King	Leroy Goldstein	Ronnie Sox	
1972	Don Garlits	Ed McCulloch	Don Carlton	
1973	Herm Petersen	Pat Foster	Don Nicholson	
1974	Dave Settles	Don Prudhomme	Wally Booth	
1975	Dale Funk	Don Prudhomme	Bob Glidden	
1976	James Warren	Don Prudhomme	Larry Lombardo	
1977	Don Garlits	Gordie Bonin	Don Nicholson	
1978	Don Garlits	Dale Pulde	Frank Iaconio	
1979	Kelly Brown	Gordie Bonin	Bob Glidden	
1980	Gary Beck	Don Prudhomme	Lee Shepherd	
1981	Shirley Muldowney	Gordie Bonin	Frank Iaconio	
1982	Shirley Muldowney	Frank Hawley	Lee Shepherd	
1983	Gary Beck	Frank Hawley	Lee Shepherd	
1984	Joe Amato	Kenny Bernstein	Warren Johnson	
1985	Dick Lahaie	Kenny Bernstein	Warren Johnson	
1986	Don Garlits	Ed McCulloch	Don Campanello	Rick Stetson
1987	Joe Amato	Don Prudhomme	Butch Leal	Terry Vance
1988	Eddie Hill	Kenny Bernstein	Bruce Allen	Terry Vance
1989	Darrell Gwynn	Ed McCulloch	Darrell Alderman	John Mafaro
1990	Darrell Gwynn	Ed McCulloch	Kenny Delco	John Myers
1991	Joe Amato	Mark Oswald	Warren Johnson	Dave Schultz
1992	Eddie Hill	John Force	Warren Johnson	Jim Bernard
1993	Eddie Hill	John Force	Warren Johnson	John Smith
1994	Connie Kalitta	John Force	Warren Johnson	John Myers
1995	Larry Dixon	John Force	Darrell Alderman	John Myers
1996	Blaine Johnson	John Force	Jim Yates	Dave Schultz
1997	Joe Amato	Al Hoffman	Jim Yates	Dave Schultz
1998	Kenny Bernstein	Cruz Pedregon	Warren Johnson	Matt Hines
1999	Mike Dunn	John Force	Warren Johnson	Angelle Sampey
2000	Doug Kalitta	Jerry Toliver	Warren Johnson	Dave Schultz
2001	Larry Dixon	John Force	Jeg Coughlin	Matt Hines
2002	Larry Dixon	Tony Pedregon	Darrell Alderman	Craig Treble
2003	Brandon Bernstein	Gary Densham	Kurt Johnson	Angelle Sampey
2004	Tony Schumacher	Del Worsham	Greg Anderson	Andrew Hines
2005	Doug Kalitta	Whit Bazemore	Jason Line	Steve Johnson
2006	David Grubnic	Ron Capps	Tom Martino	Angelle Sampey
2007	Tony Schumacher	Ron Capps	Greg Anderson	Karen Stoffer
2008	Tony Schumacher	Tony Pedregon	Jeg Coughlin	Matt Guidera
2009	Larry Dixon	Bob Tasca III	Jason Line	Hector Arana Sr
2010	Tony Schumacher	Tim Wilkerson	Jason Line	Eddie Krawiec
2011	Del Worsham	Mike Neff	Jason Line	Eddie Krawiec
2012	Morgan Lucas	Robert Hight	Mike Edwards	Eddie Krawiec
2013	Antron Brown	Johnny Gray	Allen Johnson	Hector Arana Jr
2014	Doug Kalitta	Robert Hight	Allen Johnson	Steve Johnson
2015	Spencer Massey	Ron Capps	Greg Anderson	Karen Stoffner
2016	Brittany Force	Tim Wilkerson	Jason Line	Eddie Krawiec
2017	Tony Schumacher	John Force	Shane Gray	Eddie Krawiec
2018	Richie Crampton	Jack Beckman	Tanner Gray	Eddie Krawiec
2019	Richie Crampton	Robert Hight	Bo Butner	Andrew Hines
2020	Steve Torrence	Ron Capps	Alex Laughlin	Matt Smith
2021	Josh Hart	J.R. Todd	Greg Anderson	Matt Smith
2022	Tripp Tatum	Matt Hagan	Dallas Glenn	Karen Stoffer
2023	Mike Salinas	Matt Hagan	Troy Coughlin Jr.	Gaige Herrera
2024	Shawn Langdon	J.R. Todd	Erica Enders	Gaige Herrera
2025	Antron Brown	Chad Green	Dallas Glenn	Gaige Herrera
2026	Josh Hart	Chad Green	Matt Hartford	Richard Gadson
