= Chris Karamesines =

American racing driver (born 1931)

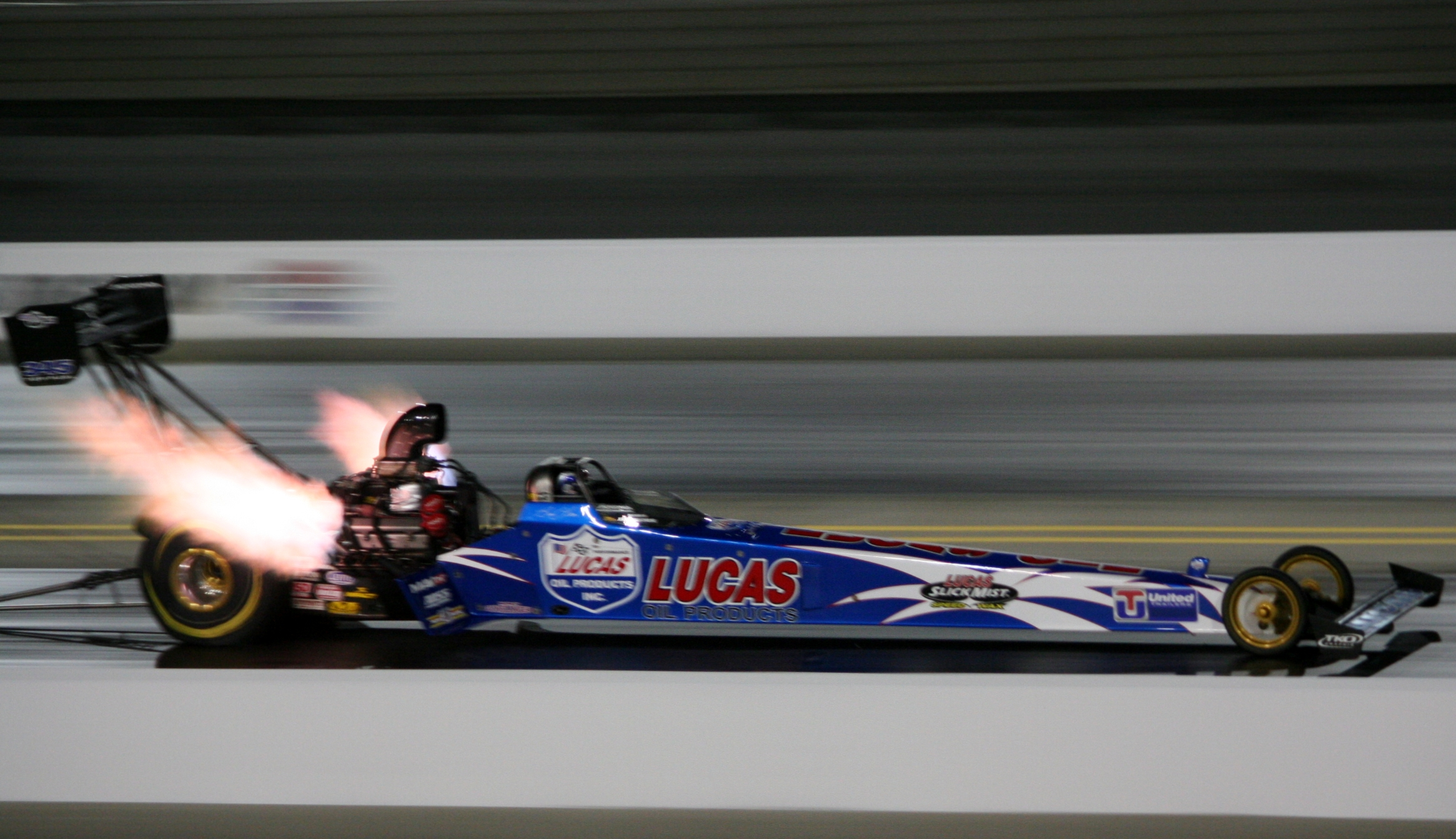
- Karamesines at Charlotte in September 2011
- Born: November 11, 1931 (age 94) Detroit, Michigan, U.S.

Awards
- Named 50 Greatest NHRA Drivers in 2001; 2006 Motorsports Hall of Fame of America Inductee; 1959 AHRA Champion

Chris Karamesines (born November 11, 1931) is an American drag racer and one of NHRA's early pioneers and nicknamed "The Golden Greek" or just simply "Greek". In 2009, he became the first driver in NHRA history to compete and become the fastest driver at over 78 years old at the final event of the 2009 season at Pomona driving in the Top Fuel category. But he would lose in the first round against Brandon Bernstein. The following year, he made an attempt at Firebird International Raceway in Arizona and made the field, but again lost in the first round. Karamesines would break his own record in 2018 at Brainerd Raceway, running a 305-mile per hour pass at 86 years old.

== Early years ==
Karamesines was born November 11, but conflicting reports raise questions regarding his birthyear. While NHRA has it listed as 1931, other sources, including The Drag Racing Hall of Fame, say he was born in 1928. At age 16, Karamesines joined the army and went to Germany during World War II, where he would stay until 1951. Karamesines served during the Nuremberg Trials, and while escorting a prisoner to the washroom, the man escaped from a moving train and he had to chase him down. Karamesines was also wounded, with a shot in the leg, which he refused to tell his commanding officer about. It was also during this time that Karamesines discovered his knack for automotive engineering. While driving a tank, Karamesines noticed one of the twin Cadillac engines not running properly. After some tinkering, he got the engine running properly. The Greek would return to the US in 1951.

== Early racing career ==
After his return from Germany, Karamesines decided to go racing as a career. Karamesines began drag racing roadsters, and would eventually make his way into dragsters. Much like Don Garlits had his series of "Swamp Rat" dragsters, Karamesines had his own name, ChiZler. One of the earliest ChiZler models was a dual engine dragster, consisting of two engines stuck together to create one. By the late 50s, Karamesines was a regular on the AHRA (American Hot Rod Association) circuit. He would capture the series greatest prize, winning the championship in 1959. The following year, Karamesines would set what many feel is the first 200 MPH run at the Alton Dragstrip in Alton, Illinois. While unofficial according to the NHRA, many consider it the first 200 MPH run. The Greek would continue in AHRA only until 1964, where he would make his debut at the 1964 Winternationals with his ChiZler dragster. In 1965, Karamesines would make his first career final round at Bristol. In 1966, Karamesines would split time between NHRA and AHRA, winning at Texas in the latter. Karamesines would race in NHRA, AHRA and IHRA through the remainder of the 60s.

== 1970s and 80s ==
In 1972, Karamesines would win events in IHRA and AHRA, but his first NHRA win would continue to elude him. By 1975, Karamesines would make an unexpected career change, making the move to Funny Car. The change was brief however, as he was back in Top Fuel in 1976. By the late 1970s and early 80s, the rise in costs to operate a competitive drag racing team were beginning to show, affecting smaller teams like Karamesines'. Karamesines only had one primary sponsor, Strange Engineering, who was able to cover costs, but was unable to provide enough to be a top team. In 1985, Karamesines would win in the ADRA event in Seattle. During the latter 80s, Karamesines started becoming less of a major threat, and would frequently be eliminated early, or miss the race altogether. Mechanical problems and the effects of an all volunteer crew also took its toll. During the 1986 NHRA Gatornationals, Karamesines won his first round race and was to face former NFL Quarterback Dan Pastorini in round two. Unfortunately, Karamesines engine had taken such a beating in round one, he was forced to withdraw. During another event, Karamesines volunteer crew was to blame, as the parachute packs had not been properly secured, causing the chutes to deploy on launch.

== 1990s ==
The 1990 season saw a rebirth in Karamesines career. He would acquire one of the new sleek 300 inch wheelbase dragsters, as well as the talents of crew chief and mechanic Lance Larson. The pairing gained notoriety at the Le Grandnational in Montreal, Quebec, Canada. Karamesines would qualify in fourth, his highest position in years. After winning his first round race, he would be paired with young up and comer Lori Johns. Karamesines would beat Johns, advancing him to the semi-finals, where he would face Joe Amato. Despite smoking the tires, Karamesines would take down Amato, and go on to face Gary Ormsby in the finals. It was the first time that Karamesines would advance to the finals in a NHRA event. Karamesines would fall to Ormsby. Weeks later in Sonoma, Karamesines would again face Amato and Ormsby in the quarter and semi finals, beating Amato following a red light, but falling to Ormsby after smoking the tires. Later that year at Seattle's Seafair Nationals, Karamesines would defeat three-time top fuel champion Shirley Muldowney in round one, Frank Hawley, owner of the Hawley School of Drag Racing in Florida, in round two, and Frank Bradley in round 3, after mechanical issues kept Bradley kept him from making it to the line. The finals would be a rematch of the Le Grandnational, as Karamesines would face Gary Ormsby again. This time, an engine explosion would keep him away his first win. The magic of 1990 would not carry over to '91, as he would not win a round. Following the 1993 season, Karamesines would take a sabbatical from NHRA, assisting his son in law Bobby Baldwin with his top fuel career. By 1999 though, Karamesines was back behind the wheel, still with limited success though.

== 2000s ==
2001 would be an up and down season for Karamesines. Not only would he achieve his best elapsed time and speed, finally breaking into the four second bracket and breaking the 300 mile per hour barrier, he would see the return of longtime friend and rival Big Daddy Don Garlits. He would run 13 events, again with limited success. The 2001 season would end on a somber note for Karamesines and family, as his son in law, Bobby Baldwin, would pass away unexpectedly at age 54. 2002 would see him run at 17 events. One highlight for the Greek came at the 2002 Gatornationals during final round qualifying. Out of the field and struggling for speed, Karamesines would sit in the lanes watching Don Garlits, who was having problems of his own testing a new dragster, break into the field in the last qualified position, number 16. Unbeknownst to Garlits, who was elated to have made the show, Karamesines and others would still have the chance to qualify. Following Garlits was Karamesines, who would run fast enough to bump Big Daddy from the show. Karamesines would eventually be bumped himself. 2003 would see Karamesines reduce his schedule, this time only attending nine events, qualifying for three. 2004 and 2005 would see Karamesines attempt six and three races respectively, failing to qualify each time. In 2006, Karamesines would be inducted into the International Motorsports Hall of Fame. Induction usually requires retirement for at least five years, unless considered a special case. For his 50-year career, Karamesines was considered a special case and was granted induction. In 2007, Karamesines would only attend one event. 2009 saw the introduction of the "1000 Foot Rule" for Top Fuel and Funny Car following the death of Scott Kalitta in 2008. While many saw it as a negative, others saw it as a positive besides the safety. Under these new rules, Karamesines would record a career best time at the second Pomona race. 2010 would see him record a career best speed.

== Since 2011 ==
By 2011, Karamesines was the oldest active driver in NHRA's top ranks. He would continue to show speed to qualify for races, but would fall in the first round. Then came the Thunder Valley Nationals in Bristol, Tennessee. During qualifying, ESPN's commentary team of Paul Page and Mike Dunn would make mention of the fact that Karamesines last won a round of racing in 1990. The Greek would qualify 13th, placing him against number 4 qualifier Doug Kalitta. On race day, Karamesines defeated Kalitta in the first round of final eliminations after Kalitta smoked his tires, giving Karamesines his first round win since 1990. Karamesines would fall to Antron Brown in round 2. 2012 saw Karamesines score a unique opportunity from Lucas Oil founder Forest Lucas. Lucas agreed to fully sponsor Karamesines dragster for as long as he would choose to race. It was the first major sponsor of his career. 2013 at Brainerd saw Karamesines take down number 1 qualifier Tony Schumacher. On June 15, 2014, at Bristol, Karamesines, the #16 qualifier knocked out #1 qualifier Brittany Force in the first round and then lost to Antron Brown in the second round. Following this race, Don Shumacher would present The Greek with a gift, a canopy enclosed cockpit for his dragster. At the same event two years later, Force defeated Karamesines in the first round. At the 2016 Charlotte 4-wide nationals, Karamesines' granddaughter, Krista Baldwin, was entered alongside her grandpa running her Alcohol Dragster. Karamesines scored a round win at Gainesville in 2016, defeating number one qualifier Richie Crampton. The Greek would run 5 times in 2017. Before the 2018 season, Karamesines had to have his hip replaced, and would miss the opening of the season. He would return for the Route 66 Nationals in Chicago, his home race. The event at Brainerd in 2018 saw Karamesines set a record, becoming the oldest driver in NHRA to run a speed over 300 mph. Karamesines would continue his partial schedule in 2019, making his first appearance at the 50th Annual Gatornationals. Karamesines would qualify for three events, and was eliminated in the first round each time. As the 2020 season began, Karamesines again planned his similar campaign, attempting as many races as possible. These plans, however, quickly changed following the NHRA's season suspension due to the COVID-19 outbreak. Karamesines would soon have a bigger problem to face, bladder cancer. The Greek would battle the disease for six months, before it would go into remission. When the season resumed in June 2020, Karamesines had no announced plans to return to driving. In October at Gateway, Karamesines and team would return, qualifying 14th. A leg injury left Karamesines with a limp and was having a hard time walking around the pits. It was also here that Karamesines hinted that the 2020 season would be his last behind the wheel. The following Monday, his granddaughter Krista would complete her top fuel licensing run in her grandfather's dragster. He would also run the final race of the season at Las Vegas, where he revealed that he would indeed step out of the cockpit and that granddaughter Krista would takeover driving duties. Karamesines, through tears, said "It's been 63 years of fun, and I have loved every minute of it."

Following his retirement, Karamesines would place his granddaughter Krista Baldwin behind the wheel of his top fuel dragster for the 2021 season, retaining sponsorship from Strange Engineering and Lucas Oil. In her first attempt, Baldwin would be the lone DNQ at the Gatornationals. Her next attempt would come at Charlotte's 4-Wide Nationals. Baldwin would advance to the quarter finals, the first time the Karamesines team would advance since 2016. The team's next attempt would come at Norwalk, Ohio. Baldwin and team would easily qualify. However, a broken reverse gear would keep the team from making a pass, resulting in a first round elimination on race day.
