= Eddie Hill =

American drag racer (born 1936)

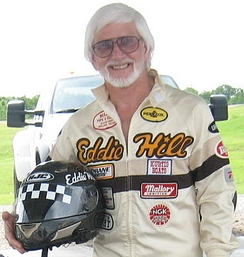
- Hill in 2008
- Nationality: American
- Born: March 6, 1936 (age 90)
- Retired: 1999

NHRA Top Fuel
- Years active: 1963–1966, 1985–1999
- Teams: self-owned
- Wins: 13
- Best finish: 1st in 1993

Championship titles
- 12 national titles

Awards
- ranked 14th on NHRA's Top 50 drivers (2001); Motorsports Hall of Fame of America (2002); Drag Racing Hall of Fame (1978); Texas Motor Sports Hall of Fame (2007)

Eddie Hill (born March 6, 1936) is an American retired drag racer who won numerous drag racing championships on land and water. Hill had the first run in the four second range (4.990 seconds), which earned him the nickname "Four Father of Drag Racing." His other nicknames include "The Thrill", "Holeshot Hill", and "Fast Eddie". In 1960, he set the NHRA record for the largest improvement in the elapsed time (e.t.) when he drove the quarter mile in 8.84 seconds to break the previous 9.40-second record.

Hill raced at open competitions and Top Fuel events from 1955 until he retired in 1966. After opening a motorcycle shop, he returned several years later to race motorcycles. He started racing drag boats after attending a drag boat event in 1974 and he won championships in all of the major boat drag racing sanctioning bodies. Hill set the lowest wet elapsed time (e.t.) record with a 5.16-second run, which was lower than the land drag racing record of 5.39 seconds. He quit water drag racing after he suffered broken bones at a crash in Arizona and returned to land drag racing in 1985. Initially underfunded and unsuccessful, Hill set the all-time speed record at a National Hot Rod Association (NHRA) event in 1987, becoming the first person to hold both the land and water speed records simultaneously. In 1993, Hill became the NHRA's oldest Top Fuel champion. When Hill retired in 1999, he had won 12 national season point championships on land or water, and had won more than 100 trophies in motorcycles and 86 drag events between his land and water careers.

== Racing career ==
In 1947, 11-year-old Hill won the Tri-State Motor Scooter Flat Track championship in Shreveport, Louisiana. After graduating from Longview High School, he graduated from college in 1957 with an industrial technology degree from Texas A&M University.

=== Land drag racing ===
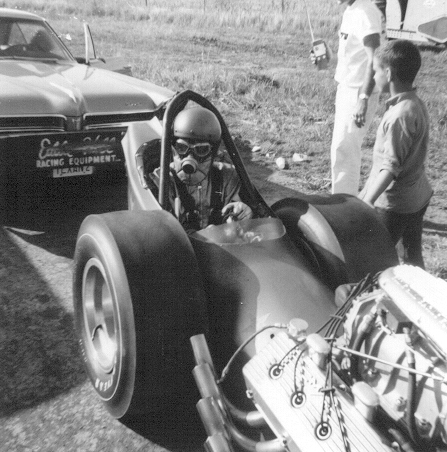
Hill in his Top Fuel dragster in 1966

Hill's entered his first drag race at the Flying Fish Lodge in Karnack, Texas in 1955. Hill drove his home-built hot rod to the track and won the event. The hot rod had a Model T frame and an Oldsmobile V8 engine. In 1958, he built his second dragster using parts that his employer allowed him to scavenge while working as a sales engineer at a foundry in Wichita Falls, Texas. He used the dragster to set the Texas state low elapsed time (e.t.) that year with a 9.93-second pass. The following year, Hill won the state championship with a 9.25-second pass at 161 miles per hour (259 kilometers per hour). Hill won his first national event in 1959 in a Hot Gas race at an American Hot Rod Association (AHRA) national championship event in Great Bend, Kansas. Hill earned $500 for an appearance at Inyokern, California to race Jack Chrisman and his Sidewinder dragster. One of his four passes in the 1960 event set the B/Gas dragster record at 163.04 mph (262.39 km/h), so Hill quit his job to become a full-time drag racer. Later that season he set the a new A/Gas low e.t. at 8.84 seconds and set the speed record in the class at 161.29 mph (259.57 km/h).

Hill spent four months designing and seven months building another home-built dragster called the Double Dragon. The machine had two engines, with each engine having its own ring gear and pinion, clutch, and driveshaft. He used four rear racing slick tires in open competitions for faster passes, and two rear slicks in match competitions to produce smokier passes. The machine ripped up the starting line at the 1961 NHRA Nationals at Indianapolis. In 1962, Hill ran 202.70 mph (326.21 km/h) two years after Chris Karamesines had the first 200 mph (320 km/h) pass and two years before Don Garlits had the first official 200 mph (320 km/h) pass. A speed or e.t. record is first certified official after it is backed up by a different pass within one percent. Hill built his first Top Fuel dragster in 1963 using a Pontiac engine. He had nearly completed a jet-engine powered ultralight dragster in 1963 when the NHRA outlawed all aircraft engines. He built two more Top Fuel Hemi-powered dragsters before he had an engine fire at Green Valley Race City in 1966. "It was one of those fireballs that you couldn't see through," Hill said. "I locked up the brakes, and it felt like I needed to turn the wheel to the left, but for some reason, I didn't. I had to do something that was counterintuitive, and it spooked me." Hill had managed to steer straight down a course that was lined with trees. Hill had been using the Double Dragon to win matches, which were used to finance his Top Fuel dragster. The Double Dragon had been destroyed in a wreck two months before this fire. The fire tapped his finances and his resolve to drag race.

=== Motorcycle racing ===
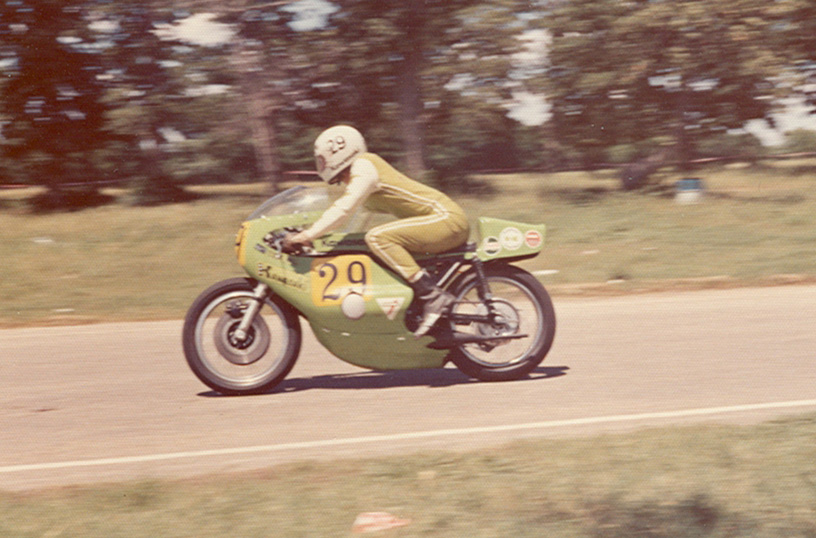
Hill racing a motorcycle in 1973

He stopped racing and opened a motorcycle dealership in Wichita Falls in 1966. The dealership is still open (as of 2008), and it is now the oldest Honda and Kawasaki dealership in Texas. He soon wanted to race again, so he built his own motorcycle and began racing as a 30-year-old. He raced in numerous types of motorcycle racing: cross country, drag racing, hare scramble, motocross, road racing, and short track. When Hill participated in a Daytona race in 1971, he had an opening lap at 151 mph (243 km/h), which was faster than factory rider Gary Nixon. Hill continued to race motorcycles and in 1972 and won the Texas state road racing championship. Hill won over 100 trophies in his motorcycle career.

=== Boat drag racing ===
Hill attended his first boat drag racing event in 1974 at Austin, Texas. He thought the drivers were "crazy" after he saw a driver being thrown from his boat during a crash. Less than a month later, Hill had stopped motorcycle racing to drag race boats, despite not being able to swim. "Once I hit the water with the boat, I never went back to motorcycles," Hill recalled. "The power, speed, and acceleration were all things that I had missed since I quit drag racing." He began racing in a non-blown hydroplane, winning in his first event. In his third race he set the class top speed. In 1975, he set the Southern Drag Boat Association (SDBA) speed record at 137.46 mph (221.22 km/h). In 1976, he switched to nitromethane fuel and set the SDBA record with a 171.81 mph (276.50 km/h) run. He was the SDBA top pointgetter and won the National Drag Boat Association (NDBA) World Fuel & Gas championship. He repeated as champion in both series in 1977, setting the NDBA record with a 170.45 mph (274.31 km/h) run.

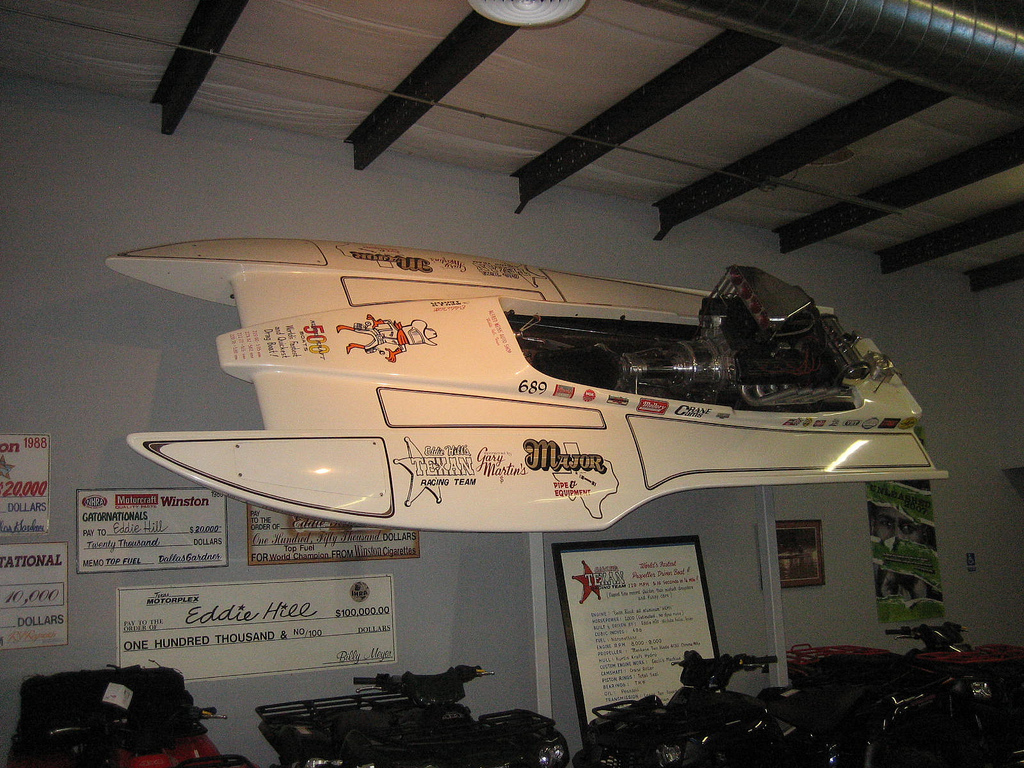
Boat that Hill drove to 229 miles per hour, on display at Eddie Hill's Fun Cycles

Hill raced an all white blown-fuel hydroplane from 1978 to 1984. He won 55 of 103 races during that time. Hill captured four American Drag Boat Association (ADBA) championships and was the SDBA top points earner in five consecutive years. In 1982, his Top Fuel hydroplane went 229.00 mph (368.54 km/h) at an NDBA event to set the world's record for a quarter mile water drag at Chowchilla, California. It was recorded in the Guinness Book of World Records, and it was not broken for 10 years. Hill also set speed records that year in the SDBA (220.76 mph), ADBA (215.82 mph), and International Hot Boat Association (IHBA) (212.78 mph). He became the only racer to hold records in all four associations simultaneously. He won the NDBA Nationals four times including three straight from 1982 until 1984. In 1983 and 1984, Hill won the World Series of Drag Boat Racing championship. The series features two races in each of the four major drag boat racing sanctioning bodies. He won 17 races between 1983 and 1984, and made 29 of 34 final rounds. Before he quit boat drag racing, he had an elapsed time of 5.16 seconds in the wet quarter mile at Firebird Lake in Chandler, Arizona. The e.t. was quicker than Gary Beck's 5.39-second NHRA Top Fuel dragster record, the first time that the water record was lower than the land record. Hill quit boat racing in October 1984 after a crash at 217 miles per hour. "It was a perfect run," Hill recalled. "I started to settle the boat back into the water, and then it took off." His Texas A&M ring was torn off his hand; he suffered seven broken bones, a concussion, & eye injuries. He spent five days in the hospital and was not fully recovered for a year.

=== Return to drag racing ===
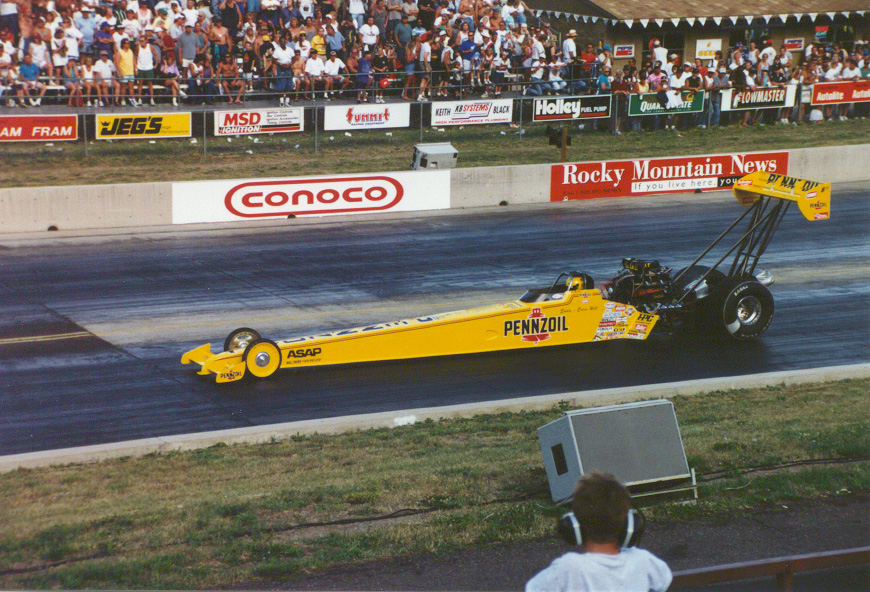
Hill's Top Fuel dragster at Bandimere Speedway circa 1996

Hill decided to come back into drag racing for 1985. He purchased Dan Pastorini's Top Fuel car and salvaged the drag boat engine from the bottom of the lake. He joined one of the most underfunded and least competitive Top Fuel teams. Hill would have quit early in the 1986 season had he not gotten some tuning advice from a competitor that helped make his car more competitive. Fifteen races after returning, he finally got out of the first round at the 1986 Mile High Nationals. Hill made it to the final round of competition, losing to Larry Minor when he lost reverse after his burnout. At the 1987 Chief Auto Parts Nationals, where he was runner-up, Hill set an NHRA record of 285.98 mph (460.24 km/h) In doing so, he became the first person to hold both the land and water quarter mile drag racing speed records simultaneously.

Hill won the first of his thirteen NHRA national events when he beat Joe Amato in final of the 1988 Mac Tools Gatornationals. Amato and Hill met in four final rounds that season, with Hill winning three. On April 9, 1988, he set the first four second elapsed time (4.990 seconds) at the International Hot Rod Association (IHRA) Texas Nationals in Ennis, TX. Hill made the run on only seven cylinders; the post-run computer readout showed his #7 cylinder failed at launch. Six months later, Hill recorded a 4.936-second e.t. at the NHRA SuperNationals at Houston on October 9, 1988. Hill set the record as the oldest Top Fuel champion when he won the season championship as a 57-year-old. It was his twelfth championship. Hill won a record-tying six of seven national events and 15 events overall. Hill finished in the Top 10 in Top Fuel points for all but one of the years between 1987 and 1995. Between 1994 and 1999, Hill won his final two events in seven finals. When Hill won the 1996 Mile High Nationals, he set the record for the oldest Top Fuel event winner at age 60. He retired in 1999.

Hill continues to race competitively to this day (May 2022) at age 86 in open wheel racecars at Hallet Motor Racing Circuit in Oklahoma.

== "Eddie Hill Rule" ==
Hill was qualifying for a 1997 event at Sonoma when his car suffered severe vibration as he crossed the finish line. The car went out of control and was completely destroyed. Hill had two broken toes and a shoulder contusion, which were not serious injuries. The run had been fast enough to make Hill the fastest qualifier, and Hill wanted to race his backup car in the first round on the day after the accident. The NHRA had a rule that the car used for qualifying had to be used in the event, so the sanctioning body did not allow him to compete. The rule was changed after the event to allow racers to race on race day even if they do not use the same car.

== Innovations ==
In 1960, Hill became the first driver to heat his rear tires with a burnout and he was the first driver to use smaller front tires on a dragster in 1958. Hill introduced the aerodynamic front wing to dragsters and charcoal masks for driver safety.

== Personal life ==
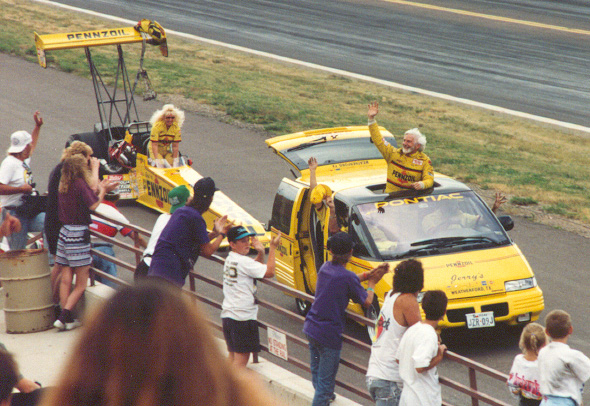
Eddie Hill waves to fans as his wife Ercie steers their dragster

Hill is married to Ercie Hill. They met at a boat drag racing event and were married on Valentine's Day in 1984. She had several roles during his career, including team co-owner, starting line navigator, record taker, pit crew member, business manager, marketing, and public relations. She has written about drag racing in National Dragster, AutoWeek, and Christian Motorsports magazines. Eddie has a daughter named Sabrina and a son named Dustin.

== Awards ==
NHRA ranked him 14th on their Top 50 drivers in 2001. He was inducted in the NHRA Drag Racing Hall of Fame in 1978, and the Texas Motor Sports Hall of Fame in 2007. In 2000, he was inducted in Don Garlits' International Drag Racing Hall of Fame. Hill was inducted into the Motorsports Hall of Fame of America in 2002. After he was notified of his nomination, he said

"It's so much more satisfying to get this award now than posthumously. This way I'll be able to enjoy it. Honestly, it was a sobering moment when they called and told me I was being inducted along with some of the people I admired most growing up. It gives you reason to pause for a moment and reflect that maybe some good was accomplished along the way."

In 1988, Hill was selected by Car Craft magazine, Hot Rod Magazine, and the International Hot Rod Association as the Person of the Year. Car Craft magazine's readers voted him the Top Fuel Driver of the Year after he won the 1993 championship.
