= Larry Dixon (dragster driver) =

American professional drag racer (born 1966)

Larry Dixon Jr.
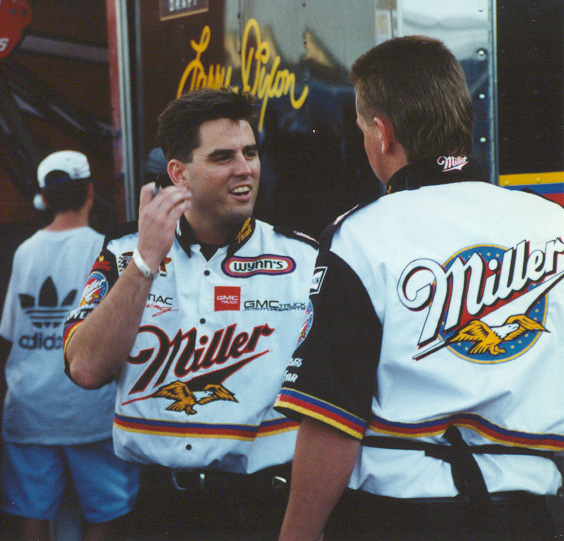
- Dixon talking with an unknown crew member
- Nationality: American
- Born: October 23, 1966 (age 60)
- Relatives: Larry Dixon Sr. (father)

NHRA Mello Yello Drag Racing Series
- Years active: 1995 - 2017
- Teams: Don Prudhomme Racing, Al-Anabi Racing
- Championships: 3 (TF)
- Wins: 62

Championship titles
- 2002, 2003, 2010: NHRA Top Fuel Champion

Awards
- 1995 2021: NHRA Rookie of the Year; Motorsports Hall of Fame of America

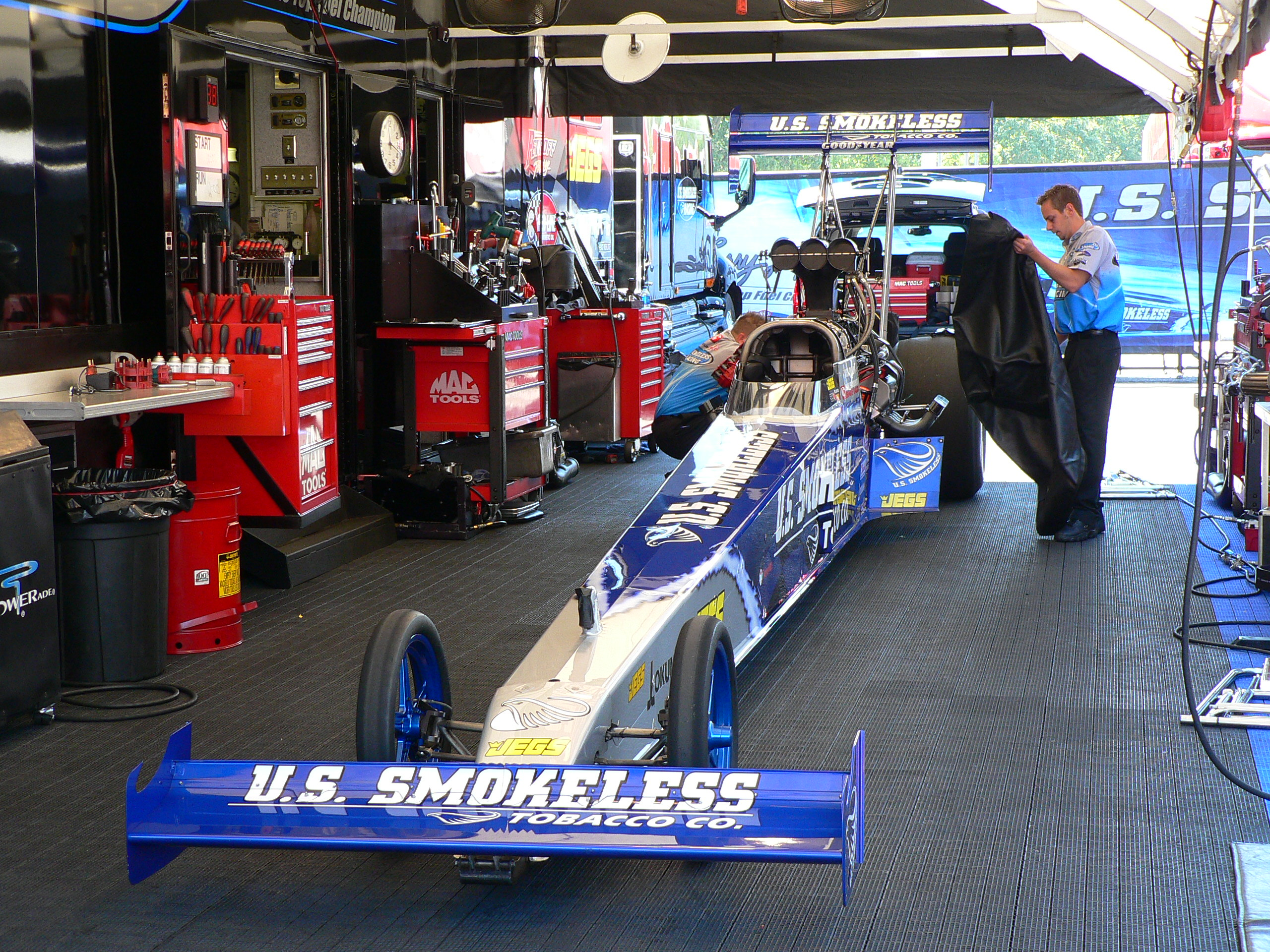
2008 U.S. Smokeless Tobacco dragster

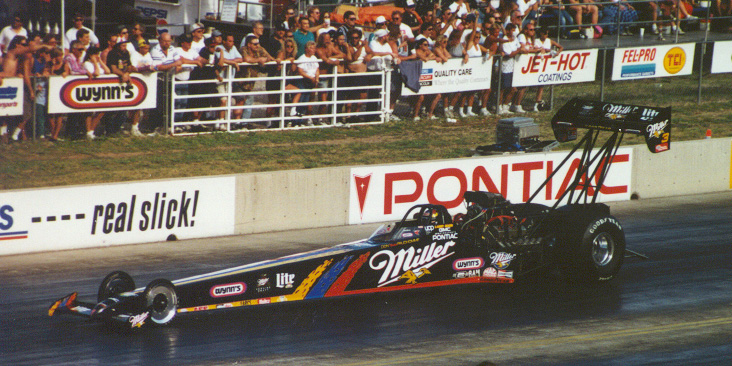
Larry Dixon MGD dragster

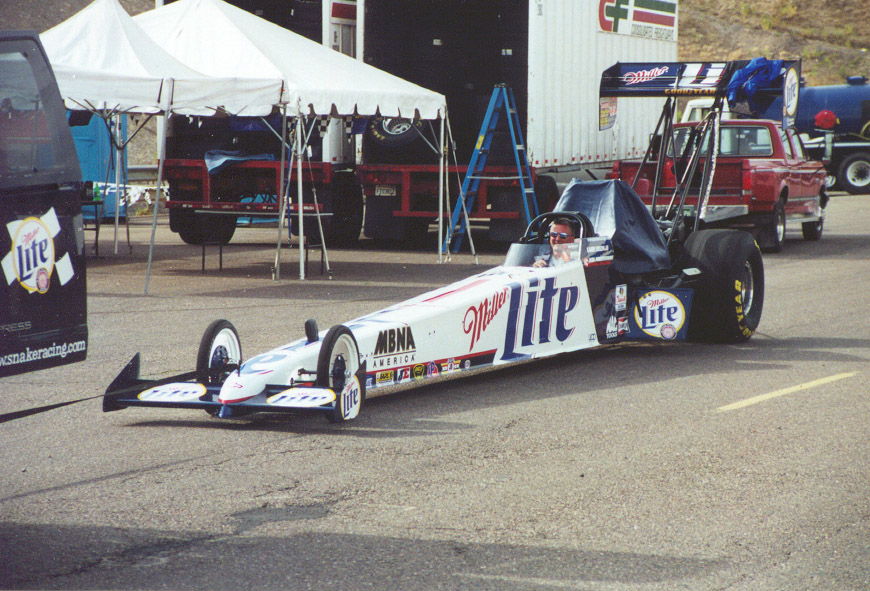
Larry Dixon 2000 Miller Lite dragster

Larry Dixon Jr. (born October 23, 1966) is an American former professional drag racer in the NHRA. Larry is the son of Larry Dixon Sr., who won Top Fuel Eliminator at the 1970 NHRA Winternationals.

== 1980s and 1990s ==
Dixon's NHRA career began when he was a worker for a team owned by Larry Minor that had Gary Beck as driver. Dixon began his long friendship with Don "the Snake" Prudhomme in 1988 while working on Prudhomme's Funny Car. In 1994, he earned his Top Fuel license with a 4.76-second pass at the Gatornationals in Gainesville, Florida. In 1995, his rookie season, he earned Rookie of the Year honors. That season he became the third rookie to win the $100,000 Budweiser Shootout, the first Top Fuel rookie to win at Indianapolis since Gary Beck in 1972 and set NHRA's elapsed time record at Englishtown.

In 1997, Dixon was the runner-up in Budweiser Shootout from the No. 8 qualifying spot. In 1998, he won Pomona 1, joining his father on the Top Fuel winner's list at the event. He qualified #1 at Indianapolis. In 1999, he became the first Top Fueler to go under 4.5 seconds.

== 2000s ==
In 2001, Dixon won six events in nine final round appearances, including the Mac Tools U.S. Nationals for the second time in his career. The victories propelled him to finish in the top-ten of the POWERade point standings for his seventh consecutive season. He also won the $100,000 Budweiser Shootout bonus event.

Dixon earned first NHRA POWERade championship in 2002 after leading the points standings all season. He tied the single-season Top Fuel record for victories with nine, and was named Driver of the Year for the second quarter.

Dixon became fifth Top Fuel driver to win consecutive NHRA POWERade Top Fuel championships in 2003. He was only the fourth driver in NHRA history to sweep the Western Swing. That year he moved to fourth on Top Fuel all-time win list and in the process recording his career-best speed (332.75 mph) which stood as national record for 15 events. He won the rain delayed 2002 Budweiser Shootout, which was completed at '03 season-opener

In 2004, Dixon earned two victories in three final round appearances and finished his tenth consecutive NHRA POWERade Series season in the top-ten points. That season, he tied legendary "Big Daddy" Don Garlits for third on all-time Top Fuel wins list with 35 career victories. He finished second at the $100,000 Budweiser Shootout after gaining starting spot in bonus event via wild-card selection.

Dixon raced to three victories in seven final rounds in 2005 clocking a career-best elapsed time (4.481s) at Pomona 1 and also posted three No. 1 qualifying positions. His victory at Englishtown, on Father's Day was his fifth consecutive victory on the day. With victory at Las Vegas 1, Dixon moved ahead of Don Garlits on all-time Top Fuel wins list. He won his third Mac Tools U.S. Nationals that year. It was his eleventh consecutive POWERade Series top-ten finish when he finished second in the POWERade point standings.

2006 saw Dixon advance to his only final round of the season on Father's Day (Englishtown), but lost on that day after having previously won the event for five consecutive seasons. He also posted four semifinal appearances and earned his twelfth consecutive POWERade Series top-ten points finish. Dixon finished in the runner-up spot at four races in 2006, including the Mac Tools U.S. Nationals.

In 2008 at Phoenix, AZ, Dixon tied second on All-Time Wins with Tony Schumacher with 43 wins in NHRA Top Fuel Competition. Then, only three weeks later in Gainesville, FL, Schumacher took over second place on the All-Time winners table when he won the Gator Nationals. As of May 2009, Schumacher leads the table with 59 wins with Dixon currently on 44. Joe Amato ranks 2nd on All-Time leader board with 52 victories in NHRA Top Fuel Competition.

In 2009, Dixon left the Prudhomme Racing camp, and went to work as the Top Fuel driver at Al-Anabi Racing, with legendary crew chief Alan Johnson working his pits, as both crew chief, and team owner. Johnson himself had been crew chief with Dixon's biggest rival, five-time champion Tony Schumacher, and was the crew chief of perhaps one of Dixon's biggest rivals in his career, Alan's brother Blaine Johnson.

In 2010, Dixon won his third Full Throttle Series world championship title. He won a record 12 races in 12 finals, including the prestigious Mac Tools U.S. Nationals for the fourth time. Dixon earned eight No. 1 qualifying positions and in the Countdown playoffs claimed three wins and three of those top-qualifying efforts. His 62 round-wins during the 2010 season tied for fifth best all-time and second-best all-time in Top Fuel.

== Sponsor Change ==
Dixon's car in the pits at the 2001 Southern Nationals at Atlanta Dragway in Commerce, Georgia.

In 2007. Miller Lite chose to leave Don Prudhomme Racing and stay with Penske Racing in the NASCAR Sprint Cup Series (then called "NEXTEL Cup"). Dixon then got a sponsorship on February 8, 2007, from SkyTel Wireless. In 2008, when teammate Tommy Johnson Jr. left to drive for the re-retired Kenny Bernstein in the Monster Energy Drink Dodge Charger, Dixon got the sponsorship of the U.S. Smokeless Tobacco Co.

== After Leaving the Snake ==
Dixon bought out the last year of his contract with Snake Racing, in order to sign with Al-Anabi as driver of the Qatar/Al-Anabi-sponsored top fuel dragster. His crew chief is Jason McCulloch, son of Funny Car legend and fellow crew chief Ed "The Ace" McCulloch. Dixon's Funny Car teammate is Del Worsham. Out of nine final round appearances in 2009, Dixon won five, including winning the Gatornationals in Gainesville, Florida and was runner-up to Tony Schumacher at the Mac Tools U.S. Nationals. Dixon finished 2009 just two points behind NHRA Full Throttle Drag Racing Series champion Schumacher. Dixon would go on to win the 2010 Top Fuel championship, netting twelve event wins, including three during the Countdown to the Championship.

In 108 career final round appearances, Dixon has won 61 (54%). At the end of 2011, Dixon had compiled 637 round wins.

At the end of the 2011 season, Dixon and Al-Anabi racing agreed to mutually separate. The reasons of this mutual decision are private team matters; no further was provided. Dixon spent much of 2012 on the sidelines before switching to a part-time Australian team, Rapisarda Racing, where he set the fastest official quarter-mile drag race at 4.503 seconds with a 332.18 MPH record in Australia, where ANDRA races the distance at circuits that are possible. Dixon made starts for Bob Vandergriff in the NHRA for 2014 and 2015, even fighting throat cancer in a battle which he won, finishing fourth in 2015 before losing his ride at the end of 2015. He returned to Rapisarda for IHRA races in Australia, winning the City of Ipswich Winternationals at Willowbank Raceway.

=== NHRA ban ===
In 2017, Dixon was banned by the NHRA after showing off a two-seater dragster, meant to give rides to customers as part of a "drag racing experience", with an unauthorized NHRA chassis inspection tag. Dixon responded in 2019 by filing a lawsuit against the NHRA, claiming that the sport banned him as part of an effort to control the market on two seater dragster experiences. In 2020, a judge dismissed much of Dixon's lawsuit.

== Personal life ==
Dixon lives in Avon, Indiana and is married to Allison Dixon and they have three children: Donovan, Alanna, and Darien.

== Awards ==
Dixon was inducted into the Motorsports Hall of Fame of America in 2021.
