= Fast Masters =

- Venue: Indianapolis Raceway Park
- Corporate sponsor: Jaguar, Havoline
- First race: 1993
- Last race: 1993
- Most wins (driver): Bobby Unser (1)

Fast Masters was a made-for-television auto racing series, broadcast on ESPN in 1993, featuring notable drivers over the age of 50, most of whom were retired from professional racing at the time. The Fast Masters series was a summer-long elimination competition, with identically prepared, $750,000, TWR, Jaguar XJ220s racing on Bridgestone RE71 high-performance street tires. The races took place under-the-lights at Indianapolis Raceway Park, in conjunction with ESPN's Saturday Night Thunder. The cars carried the sponsorship of Havoline, and the series was officially sanctioned by USAC.

Close and intense racing ruled each night as championship winning veterans from Formula One, IndyCar, NASCAR, NHRA, Endurance racing and more, including some who were well into their 70s, fought hard for every position. The series quickly gained a reputation for hard driving, including crashes that severely damaged, or even totaled, multiple machines.

Three-time Indianapolis 500 winner Bobby Unser won the championship, claiming the $100,000 top prize.

== Course and race details ==
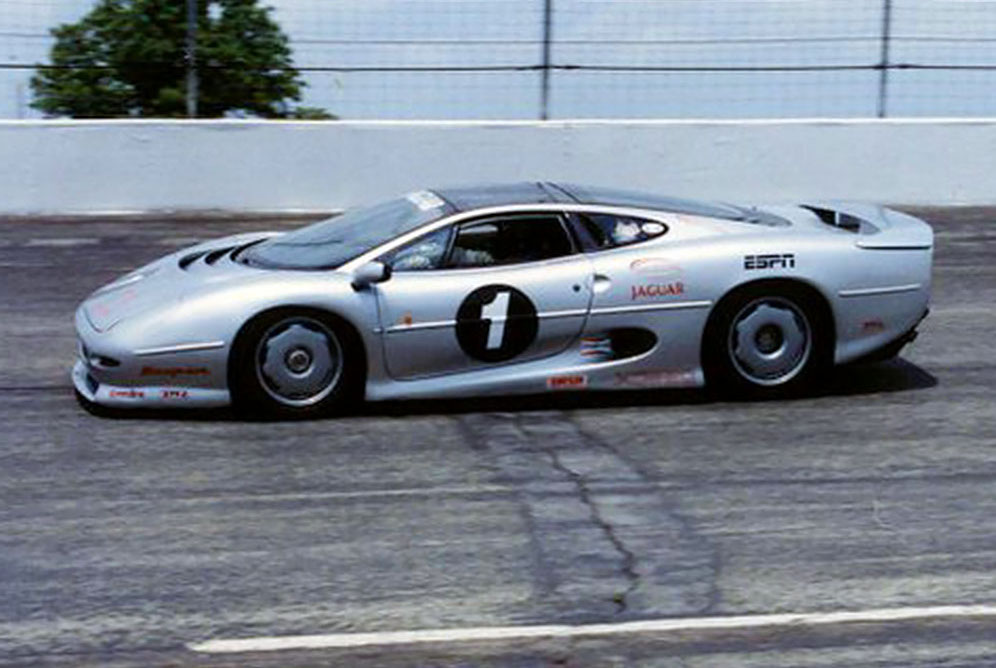
Fast Masters Jaguar XJ220

The races took place at the 5/8 mile paved oval at Indianapolis Raceway Park. The course was modified to include a dog-leg chicane in place of oval turn one. The cars would go down the mainstretch, divert off the oval to the infield "road course" segment, consisting of consecutive 90-degree left-right-left corners. The cars would come back on to the oval in turn two, and complete the rest of the lap.

The program was scheduled for six weeks – five preliminary rounds culminating with the final round. The Fast Master races were held in between heats of the weekly Saturday night sprint car races. The original plan called for each round to have two ten-lap heats amongst ten drivers. The starting lineup for the first heat would be determined by a blind draw. The finishing order for the first heat was reverted to set the lineup for the second heat. The drivers were to earn points based on their finishing position in each heat:

Finishing position	1st	2nd	3rd	4th	5th	6th	7th	8th	9th	10th
Points	10	9	8	7	6	5	4	3	2	1

The top two drivers based on points from each round would advance to the final championship round. In all heats, caution laps did not count. A $1,000 bonus was given to the driver who led the most laps each week.

The original plans had called for three heats per week. The first 10-lap heat would utilize the full oval track and the second 10-lap heat used the "road course" (or "roval") layout. The third heat was to be a 12-lap finale that included six laps on the oval and six laps on the "roval". However, those plans were scrapped during the very first weekend when multiple cars were wrecked in high-speed crashes on the oval. The resulting damage to the cars created costly repair work, and at least two machines were said to be totaled. On opening night, the third heat was cancelled outright due to lateness and damage incurred during the earlier heats.

=== Revised format ===
Starting in week 2 a retooled format was introduced, dropping the oval race and the points structure. Instead, each week would feature smaller fields and all racing was moved to the "roval" layout. Each round would consist of single-car time trials, one last-chance "Heat race," and a single "Feature" main event. The top four cars in single-car time trials automatically qualified for the Feature. The remaining four cars participated in the Heat race - with the winner of the Heat race advancing to the Feature.

The top two finishers in the Feature race would advance to the championship finals in August.

== Participants ==
- Bob Akin
- Bobby Allison
- Donnie Allison
- Buddy Baker
- Derek Bell
- Gary Bettenhausen
- Tom Bigelow
- Bob Bondurant
- Bob Christie
- Larry Dickson
- Guy Edwards
- Vic Elford
- Walker Evans
- Gene Felton
- George Follmer
- Harry Gant
- Charlie Glotzbach
- Paul Goldsmith
- Jerry Grant
- Dick Greer
- Pete Hamilton
- Eddie Hill
- David Hobbs
- Parnelli Jones
- Mel Kenyon
- Elmo Langley
- Fred Lorenzen
- Ed McCulloch
- Jim McElreath
- Hershel McGriff
- Paul Newman
- Marvin Panch
- Benny Parsons
- David Pearson
- Henri Pescarolo
- Tom Pistone
- Lennie Pond
- Jim Rathmann
- Brian Redman
- Jody Ridley
- Lloyd Ruby
- Johnny Rutherford
- Troy Ruttman
- Dick Simon
- Bill Simpson
- George Snider
- Dick Trickle
- Bobby Unser
- Rodger Ward
- Bob Wollek
- Buck Baker

== Race results ==
=== Round 1: Saturday June 19 ===
The first preliminary round was held Saturday June 19. The nine drivers conducted a blind draw for the starting positions, with Bob Akin drawing the pole. A tenth driver, Gary Bettenhausen, was forced to withdraw after hitting the wall during practice on Friday afternoon. He was uninjured, and instead served as "honorary crew chief" for Troy Ruttman. In the interest of safety and cost-savings, a rule had been put in place that stated that any driver who had wall contact of any kind during practice, was prohibited from racing on Saturday night. The race marked the return of Bobby Allison to a race car, exactly five years to the day he suffered his career-ending injuries at Pocono.

The first heat consisted of ten laps on the oval, starting double-file. At the start, polesitter Bob Akin missed a shift, and precariously shuffled to the back of the pack. Ed McCulloch took the lead from Fred Lorenzen down the backstretch, and led the first lap. The first of many crashes that would happen during Fast Masters came as the cars were completing the second lap. Jim McElreath tried to go three-wide coming out of turn four, but lost control, collecting Dick Trickle. On lap 3, Troy Ruttman attempted a diving move passing two cars in turn three, however, he spun and crashed. McColluch led wire-to-wire, and took the first heat.

Heat 1 Results - Oval
Fin. Pos	St. Pos	Car No.	Driver	Laps	Status
1	4	8	Ed McCulloch	10	Running
2	2	7	Fred Lorenzen	10	Running
3	6	3	Bobby Allison	10	Running
4	1	2	Bob Akin	10	Running
5	7	5	Jerry Grant	10	Running
6	3	6	Dick Greer	10	Running
7	8	10	Troy Ruttman	3	Crash
8	9	11	Dick Trickle	2	Crash
9	5	9	Jim McElreath	3	Crash
DNS	–	4	Gary Bettenhausen	–	Practice crash

The second heat lined up with only six cars. McElreath, Trickle, and Ruttman all were out due to crashes during the first heat. Dick Greer lined up on the pole. The modified "road course" layout was used, and the race was scheduled for 10 laps. Going into the road course dog-leg for the first time, Greer led, but Jerry Grant locked up the brakes and ran into the back of Bobby Allison. Both cars spun out, and Grant was out with damage to the front end.

The race became a three-way battle between Greer, Akin, and McCullcoch. Bobby Allison was charging in fourth. With three laps to go, Greer suddenly spun out in turn one, handing the lead to Akin. On the restart, Akin held the lead, but drag racer McCulloch shocked the establishment by taking the lead with two laps to go and sweeping both heats for the night. Ed McCulloch was the winner in points for the night with 20 total. Bob Akin also advanced to the finals.

Heat 2 Results - Road Course
Fin. Pos	St. Pos	Car No.	Driver	Laps	Status
1	6	8	Ed McCulloch	10	Running
2	3	2	Bob Akin	10	Running
3	4	3	Bobby Allison	10	Running
4	5	7	Fred Lorenzen	10	Running
5	1	6	Dick Greer	10	Running
6	2	5	Jerry Grant	1	Crash
DNS	–	7	Troy Ruttman	–	
DNS	–	11	Dick Trickle	–	
DNS	–	5	Jim McElreath	–	
DNS	–	4	Gary Bettenhausen	–	

=== Round 2: Saturday June 26 ===
A retooled format was introduced starting with the second week of competition. After major crashes in the first week (which totaled two of the $750,000 machines), the heat on the oval track was dropped. The racing moved exclusively to the modified "road course," the number of participants for the week was reduced to eight, and the points system was scrapped. Instead of a blind draw to set the lineup, time trials were held, and the field would line up in single-file to take the green flag. The top four qualifiers were locked-in, and automatically advanced to the eight-lap "Feature" event. A last-chance, five-lap, "Heat Race" was held between the other four drivers, with the winner alone advancing to the Feature.

During time trials, Harry Gant was the fastest qualifier, turning in a lap of 33.33 seconds. Brian Redman, Donnie Allison, and Pete Hamilton also qualified for the Feature. Gant won a $1,000 bonus for winning the pole.

In the Heat Race, pole-sitter Elmo Langley took the lead going into turn one. Langley drove side-by-side with David Hobbs for two laps, and Benny Parsons was close behind in third. Hobbs took the lead going into turn one on lap 3, and held off Parsons at the finish line to win the heat and advance to the "Feature" event.

During the 8-lap Feature, David Hobbs jumped the start passing two cars before the start/finish line, and officials waved off the green flag. On the ensuing start, Harry Gant took the lead into turn one, but missed a shift in the dog-leg, and fell to 3rd. Brian Redman slipped by to take the lead going down the backstretch. On lap 2, Gant missed the turn into the dog-leg, slid sideways, and dropped out. Redman pulled out to a large lead, with Hamilton second, and Hobbs third at the white flag. On the final lap, Hamilton overshot his braking point, and spun out in turn 1. Hobbs slipped by to take second place as Redman won the Feature.

Redman and Hobbs advanced to the Finals.

Results - Heat race
Fin. Pos	St. Pos	Car No.	Driver	Laps	Status
1	2	7	David Hobbs	5	Running
2	3	3	Benny Parsons	5	Running
3	1	6	Elmo Langley	5	Running
4	4	8	Bob Christie	5	Running

Results - Feature event
Fin. Pos	St. Pos	Car No.	Driver	Laps	Status
1	2	8	Brian Redman	8	Running
2	5	7	David Hobbs	8	Running
3	4	6	Donnie Allison	8	Running
4	3	3	Pete Hamilton	8	Running
5	1	10	Harry Gant	1	Out

=== Round 3: Saturday July 10 ===
The third preliminary round was held Saturday July 10. Parnelli Jones won the pole position with a time of 33.443 seconds. Eddie Hill won the Heat race and advanced to the feature. Jones led all 8 laps of the feature to claim the victory. Hill finished second in the feature and advanced to the finals along with Jones.

Hershel McGriff blew through the turn one chicane when he attempted to pass Jones, but he rebounded for a third-place finish. On the final lap, Bob Bondurant and Lloyd Ruby were battling for second when they made contact, and dropped to 4th and 5th, respectively.

Results - Heat race
Fin. Pos	St. Pos	Car No.	Driver	Laps	Status
1	1	3	Eddie Hill	5	Running
2	2	4	Lennie Pond	5	Running
3	4	8	Marvin Panch	5	Running
4	3	6	Rodger Ward	5	Running

Results - Feature event
Fin. Pos	St. Pos	Car No.	Driver	Laps	Status
1	1	3	Parnelli Jones	8	Running
2	5	10	Eddie Hill	8	Running
3	2	4	Hershel McGriff	8	Running
4	3	6	Bob Bondurant	7	Contact
5	4	8	Lloyd Ruby	7	Contact

=== Round 4: Saturday July 17 ===
The fourth preliminary round was held Saturday July 17. Practice scheduled for Friday was rained out. As a result, a makeup practice session was held on Saturday morning. The fastest times were recorded in case rain returned and qualifying were to be rained out. George Follmer had a time of 33.308 seconds to place himself provisionally on the pole. On Saturday evening, the threat of rain went away, and time trials were held as scheduled. George Follmer (33.95 seconds) won the pole position. David Pearson (33.96), Paul Newman (34.37), and Walker Evans (34.49) each qualified for feature.

Derek Bell started from the pole for the Heat race, and Jody Ridley started second. At the start, Ridley locked up the brakes and missed the entrance into turn one. He was able to continue, but lost several seconds and wound up finishing last. Bell led all five laps and advanced to the feature. Goldsmith and Rathmann ran close together in 2nd–3rd, but were no match for Bell.

In the Feature, Bell switched from the #9 car to the #4 car. George Follmer took the lead at the start and led wire-to-wire. With Follmer and David Pearson pulling away, Newman settled into third. On lap 5, however, Newman hit a bump and spun going into turn one. He tried to turn the car around, but wound up stuck in the muddy infield. Follmer and Pearson finished 1st–2nd and advanced to the finals.

Results - Heat race
Fin. Pos	St. Pos	Car No.	Driver	Laps	Status
1	1	9	Derek Bell	5	Running
2	3	4	Paul Goldsmith	5	Running
3	4	7	Jim Rathmann	5	Running
4	2	5	Jody Ridley	5	Running

Results - Feature event
Fin. Pos	St. Pos	Car No.	Driver	Laps	Status
1	1	10	George Follmer	8	Running
2	2	9	David Pearson	8	Running
3	4	5	Walker Evans	8	Running
4	5	4	Derek Bell	8	Running
5	3	3	Paul Newman	4	Spin

=== Round 5: Saturday July 24 ===
The final preliminary round was held July 24. The last-chance heat race saw Gene Felton started first and lead all five laps to advance to the Feature. On the final lap, Bill Simpson locked up the brakes and missed turn one, handing over third place to George Snider.

Bobby Unser was the fastest qualifier, and started on the pole for the Feature. Unser took the lead into turn one, while Gene Felton quickly moved up to third place by lap 2. Unser pulled out to a large lead. The battle of the race was for second, with Felton all over the back bumper of Johnny Rutherford. On the final lap, Rutherford had a small bobble in the dog-leg section, and Felton was able to get his nose underneath. Felton nudged Rutherford and the two cars went side-by-side coming out of the dog-leg. Rutherford took him into the next turn, the two cars came together, and Felton spun a complete 360 in oval turn two. Unser went on to win comfortably, and Rutherford held on to second, with those two drivers advancing to the finals.

Results - Heat race
Fin. Pos	St. Pos	Car No.	Driver	Laps	Status
1	1	3	Gene Felton	5	Running
2	2	4	Charlie Glotzbach	5	Running
3	4	9	George Snider	5	Running
4	3	5	Bill Simpson	5	Running

Results - Feature event
Fin. Pos	St. Pos	Car No.	Driver	Laps	Status
1	2	3	Bobby Unser	8	Running
2	5	4	Johnny Rutherford	8	Running
3	4	5	Guy Edwards	8	Running
4	1	9	Gene Felton	8	Running
5	3	8	Dick Simon	8	Running

=== Championship finals: Saturday August 21 ===
The final championship round was held Saturday August 21, in conjunction with the Mel Kenyon Classic. The ten drivers who advanced to the finals participated in time trials, which set the field for two 8-lap heat races. The odd qualifiers (1, 3, 5, 7, 9) participated in Heat #1. The even qualifiers (2, 4, 6, 8, 10) participated in heat #2. The top three finishers from each heat would advance to the 12-lap main event, and race for the overall championship.

In Heat Race #1, George Follmer (33.233 seconds) started on the pole and took the lead into turn one. On lap 2, David Pearson made a daring move for third place on the outside in turn 1, but had to back off. On lap 4, Ed McCulloch locked up the brakes at the end of the mainstretch, and missed turn 1. He re-joined the race, but dropped from contention. With Follmer leading, and Parnelli Jones comfortably in second, the battle of the race was for third between Bob Akin and David Pearson. With two laps to go, Pearson passed Akin on the outside coming out of turn four. At the checkered flag, Follmer, Jones, and Pearson advanced to the main championship feature.

In Heat Race #2, Bobby Unser (33.284 seconds) started on the pole and took the lead into turn one and led wire-to-wire, with Brian Redman taking second. The attention focused on third place David Hobbs, in the final transfer spot. On lap 6, fourth place Johnny Rutherford was on Hobbs' back bumper exiting the dog-leg when he spun out in the transition to the oval. Hobbs held on to third, and Unser, Redman, and Hobbs advanced to the main championship feature.

Results - Heat Race #1 (Odd qualifiers)
Fin. Pos	St. Pos	Car No.	Driver	Laps	Status
1	1	7	George Follmer	8	Running
2	2	9	Parnelli Jones	8	Running
3	4	5	David Pearson	8	Running
4	3	6	Bob Akin	8	Running
5	5	10	Ed McCulloch	8	Running

Results - Heat Race #2 (Even qualifiers)
Fin. Pos	St. Pos	Car No.	Driver	Laps	Status
1	1	6	Bobby Unser	8	Running
2	2	3	Brian Redman	8	Running
3	3	5	David Hobbs	8	Running
4	5	4	Eddie Hill	8	Running
5	4	7	Johnny Rutherford	8	Running

The championship main event feature was scheduled for 12 laps, and would decide the $100,000 Fast Masters championship. The six qualifiers lined up double file for the start, with George Follmer on the pole, and Bobby Unser second.

At the start, Follmer and Unser went side-by-side into turn one, and battled into the dog-leg. Unser slipped by in the right-hander, and led going into the oval segment. Parnelli Jones went to the outside in turn four to try to pass Follmer. Down the frontstretch the two went side-by-side, and Jones locked up the brakes as he tried to make the pass into the dogleg. Follmer held on, and Jones stayed in third.

A yellow came out for debris, which set up a restart on lap 5. Unser and Follmer battled 1st-2nd, while Jones tried to hold off David Pearson for third.

The second yellow for debris set up a restart on lap 9. As the cars were going through turn 3 anticipating a green flag, 6th place David Hobbs jumped the restart, passing two cars and went three wide with Follmer and Jones. The scuffle sent Jones into the outside wall in turn four. Follmer's car was also damaged and he retired from the race.

The ensuing restart saw Unser leading, and Pearson in second with four laps to go. Redman and Hobbs battled for third. Unser pulled out to a comfortable lead, and wrapped up the championship in dominating fashion. With Unser winning, Pearson second, and Redman third, the top three were an Indycar veteran, a NASCAR veteran, and a road racing veteran.

Results - Championship Main Event
Fin. Pos	St. Pos	Car No.	Driver	Laps	Status	Purse
1	2	5	Bobby Unser	12	Running	$100,000
2	5	3	David Pearson	12	Running	$25,000
3	4	6	Brian Redman	12	Running	$10,000
4	6	4	David Hobbs	12	Running	
5	1	10	George Follmer	8	Crash	
6	3	7	Parnelli Jones	8	Crash	

The 1993 championship would end up being the only season contested for the Fast Masters.

== Legacy ==
In a December 2018 feature, Road & Track said the series was "an amazing farce from the start." The numerous costly accidents, of which all 12 machines incurred some sort of damage, tallied tens of thousands of dollars in repairs, and earned the series the nickname "Crash Masters". Tom Walkinshaw Racing, which was tasked with preparing, maintaining, and repairing the cars, "attempted mutiny" after the carnage of the first weekend.

Hagerty said the series "brought anything other than sheer misery to Jaguar, ESPN, and series sponsor Havoline," and was "one of the most bizarre efforts in the annals of single-make auto racing."

Despite its pejorative perception as a "demolition derby", no drivers were seriously injured. The races were praised for attracting some of the biggest American racing legends of the second half of the 20th century, some of whom had not raced professionally in many years, and introduced them to a new generation of fans. The series was described in retrospect as "one of the most delightfully unhinged racing concepts to become a reality."

== See also ==
- International Race of Champions
- Grand Prix Masters
- Superstar Racing Experience

== Footnotes ==
=== Works cited ===
- Ultimate Racing History - Indianapolis Raceway park
- 1993 Fastmasters
- Jaguar Takes Lumps With Goosebumps
