= Thursday Night Thunder =

American TV motorsports series, 1989–2002

- Also known as: Saturday Night Thunder (1990-2002)
- Genre: Auto racing telecasts
- Starring: Allen Bestwick; Joey Logano; Conor Daly; Darrell Waltrip; Matt Yocum
- Country of origin: United States
- Original language: English

Production
- Production location: Various SRX venues
- Camera setup: Multi-camera
- Running time: 1 to 2 hours (depends on Live or Tape Delay event)

Original release
- Network: ESPN
- Release: May 11, 1989 – November 30, 2002
- Release: July 13 – August 17, 2023

Thursday Night Thunder/Saturday Night Thunder is a motorsports anthology series that was originally broadcast by ESPN and ESPN2 from 1989 to 2002. The program featured coverage of short track events from dirt and paved oval tracks around the United States (primarily around the Indianapolis area), including USAC Silver Crown, midget, and sprint car races.

Jeff Gordon was introduced to midget racing via Thursday Night Thunder. He made appearances in races televised by the program before pursuing a NASCAR career. On July 21, 1990, Rich Vogler was killed in a crash during the final lap of a USAC event on Saturday Night Thunder from Salem Speedway. As Vogler led the last completed lap before the red flag was called, Vogler was also posthumously declared the winner of the race. In 1993, ESPN broadcast the Fast Masters —a series of races involving retired drivers—via the program.

In December 2022, ESPN acquired the rights to Tony Stewart's Superstar Racing Experience (SRX) series, replacing CBS Sports. It was concurrently announced that the events would air on Thursday nights, and that ESPN would revive the Thursday Night Thunder branding for the broadcasts.

== See also ==
- ESPN SpeedWorld
