= Jerry Ruth =

American professional drag racer

Jerry (The King) Ruth (1937 – July 1, 2025) was a former professional drag racer who raced in the "golden age of drag racing" in the 1960s and 1970s. He was known as drag racing's "King of the Northwest".

== Racing career ==
Ruth began his career at young age. He raced several kinds of gas-powered coups and sedans in the late 1950s and early 60's along with his brother John. In early 1963, he purchased Chevy gas-powered dragster from the Bier brothers of southern California and after racing in the A/GD gasoline classes, he started experimenting with nitro-fueled dragsters later that year. He began building several cars and amassed various wins and track records. Ruth captured the NHRA Division 6 title five years from 1964 to 1969 and began referring to himself as "The King". He quickly made a name for himself and in 1971 set a Top Fuel elapsed time of 6.43 seconds -tied for the quickest in history at the time, in his Don Long Mustang Funny Car which he built himself.

In 1972, Ruth sold his self-made car and adopted a Keith Black aluminum 426 Hemi, rear-engine dragster. He would gain prominence in 1973 when he defeated Gary Beck a two-time U.S. Nationals champion, in the 1973 NHRA World Finals at the high altitude Amarillo Dragway. He set an elapsed time of 6.11-second at 232.55 mph in his first national event win. Another notable race came in 1977 when he defeated "Big Daddy" Don Garlits at the Top Fuel Auto Club Raceway Winternationals in Pomona, California. In the 1977 NHRA Summernationals he achieved the fastest time in drag racing history of 255.63 mph while piloting Don Garlits’ “Swamp Rat".

On his way to becoming world champion, Ruth would endure several violent accidents, and suffered a broken arm and a severed fingertip. He had reached speeds of 260 mph by the time of his retirement in the mid-1980s. During his racing career Ruth earned three divisional Funny Car titles (two while driver, and one as an owner), eight divisional Top Fuel titles (including seven in a row from ’68-’74), as well as the Top Fuel world title. Ruth would also become the first driver to win both Funny Car and Top Fuel finals at the same pro event, a feat he would accomplish three more times.

== Early life ==
Ruth was born the youngest of three brothers in Kent, Washington south of Seattle on the Benson Highway. His father was a real estate developer. His brother Bill continued in his father's footsteps operating W. E. Ruth Real Estate for many years, very visibly by using a caboose as his office next door to the family home. His brother, John, was involved in auto parts. When he was young, he would race with his friends to see who could get to the Kent-Meridian High School parking lot first. Ruth considered Pacific Raceways near his hometown of Kent his all-time favorite track.

== Death ==
Ruth died at the age of 87 on July 1, 2025.
