= Gordie Bonin =

- Born: September 30, 1948; Prince Albert, Saskatchewan, Canada
- Died: November 29, 2013 (aged 65); Las Vegas, Nevada, U.S.
- Citizenship: Dual: Canada, USA
- Known for: Drag racing; first driver to break 240 miles per hour in the standing-start quarter mile

Gordie Bonin (September 30, 1948 – November 29, 2013) was a professional drag racer who, along with Ron Hodgson and Gordon Jenner, made up what is considered one of the best Canadian drag racing teams ever. Bonin was nicknamed "240 Gordie" as he was the first driver to break 240 miles per hour in the standing-start quarter mile.

At the 1978 NHRA Summernationals at Englishtown, Bonin drove the Bubble Up Pontiac Trans Am funny car.

Bonin, along with his teammates, was inducted into the Canadian Motorsport Hall of Fame in 2000.

From 1999 to 2001, Bonin also raced in the European Drag Racing Championship, winning the 1999 FIA European Drag Racing Championship with a car from Rune Fjeld Motorsports.
