= Tony Schumacher (drag racer) =

American racing driver

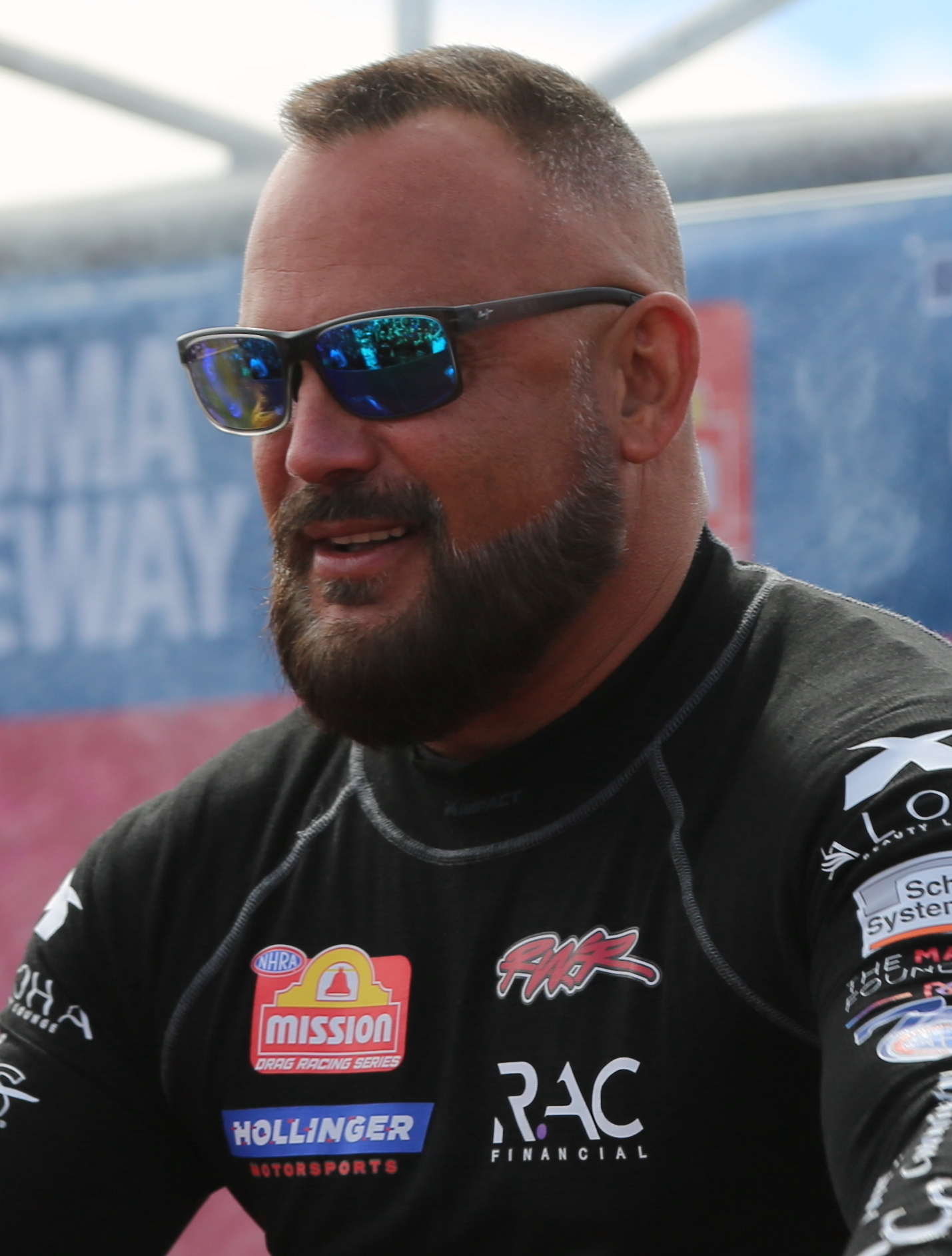
- Schumacher at Sonoma Raceway in 2026
- Nationality: American
- Born: Anthony Donald Schumacher; 25 December 1969 (age 56)
- Relatives: Don Schumacher (father)

NHRA Mission Foods Drag Racing Series career
- Current team: Rick Ware Racing
- Years active: 1996–present
- Crew chief: Jim Oberhofer, Nicky Boninfante
- Former teams: Don Schumacher Racing (DSR)
- Championships: 8 (TF)
- Wins: 88 (TF)
- Fastest laps: Best ET; 3.649 seconds; Best Speed; 338.6 mph (544.9 km/h)

Championship titles
- 1999, 2004-2009, 2014: NHRA Top Fuel Champion
- Statistics up to date as of September 15, 2025.

Anthony Donald Schumacher (born December 25, 1969) is an American drag racer who is an eight-time NHRA Champion. He is the son of former Funny Car driver Don Schumacher and was a driver for his father's multi-team organization. He was sponsored for several years by the U.S. Army and his intense personality and buzzcut hairstyle has earned him the nickname "Sarge". "The Sarge" nickname originally applied to the dragster, but soon came to be affiliated with the driver himself.

In 1999, Schumacher became the first driver to exceed 330 mph in competition. He also had the world record for the fastest 1/4 mile top fuel run: 337.58 mph, earned in 2005 at Brainerd, Minnesota. As of April 2026, Schumacher is competing in the NHRA Top Fuel class, of which he is an eight-time champion (breaking a record set by Joe Amato), winning the championship in six consecutive years (2004–2009).

== Early life and education ==
Schumacher attended Maine South High School in Park Ridge, IL, and later St. John's Military Academy in Delafield Wisconsin. He attended Oakton Community College in Des Plaines, IL.

== Racing career ==
=== 1996 season ===
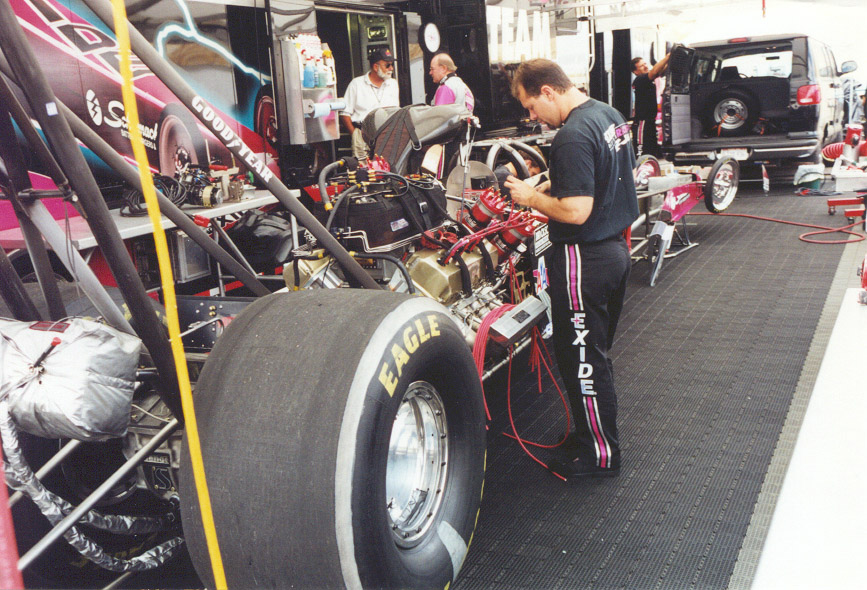
1999 dragster

The very first race for which Schumacher qualified was in 1996, at the MAC Tools U.S. Nationals, qualifying 16th. However, during that event, tragedy struck during qualifying when then Top Fuel points leader Blaine Johnson was killed in an accident. Schumacher would have raced Blaine the following day. In an emotion-filled moment for all in attendance, Schumacher honored the fallen driver by idling down the track rather than making a full pass. He made it all the way to the finals, before losing to his former DSR teammate, Cory McClenethan.

=== 2006 season ===
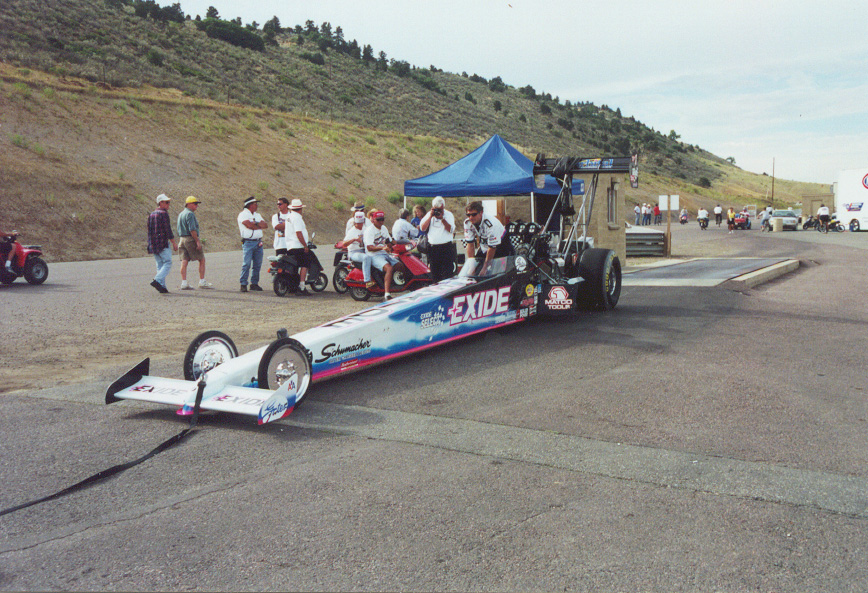
2000 dragster

Doug Kalitta dominated throughout 2006, but Schumacher came into the last race on his heels. Kalitta qualified number 1 and Schumacher number 2. Schumacher needed to go two rounds further than Kalitta as well as set a national record to win the title. Kalitta would meet Schumacher's teammate, Melanie Troxel, in round 3 and lost on a hole shot. That opened the door for Schumacher, who had to beat almost all odds to win the championship. He made it to the final where he had to run a new Top Fuel national record. He won the race and championship.

=== 2007 season ===
The 2007 season was another championship year for "the Sarge", though he struggled with round 1. He had 12 first round losses that year. In the last race, Rod Fuller was in first place, Larry Dixon was second, Brandon Berenstien was third, and Schumacher was in fourth place. Fuller lost in round 1, but his title hopes were still alive. Dixon lost in the second round, and his championship hopes were done. Schumacher and Brandon both advanced to the semi-finals and had to face each other. If Brandon won the round, he would be the champion. If Schumacher won the round, he would have to win the race to be the champion. Schumacher won the round, the race over Bob Vandergriff, and the championship by 19 points over Fuller.

=== 2008 season ===
In 2008, Schumacher had the most dominant season in Top Fuel ever. He won 15 events, seven in a row, and visited 18 final rounds. He won at least one round at every race that year. He passed Joe Amato for most championships with six, and most race wins, with 53 after winning in Charlotte, North Carolina. On September 14, 2008, at the inaugural NHRA Carolinas Nationals in Concord, North Carolina, Schumacher surpassed Joe Amato as the driver with most wins in NHRA Top Fuel history with his 53rd career victory.

In 2008, along with the 15-time Funny Car Champion John Force, and retired four-time Funny Car champion and two-time Top Fuel world champion Kenny Bernstein, in concert with NHRA's track safety programs, Schumacher helped to develop a sensor that detects any engine backfire in a nitromethane engine, and takes corrective steps to protect the driver, shutting down the fuel pump, and deploying the parachutes. This experiment was a direct result of the death of the Funny Car driver Scott Kalitta, and according to several drivers should dramatically cut down on the number of accidents caused by engine explosions.

At the end of the 2008 season, he parted ways with longtime crew chief Alan Johnson, who went on to form his team, Al-Anabi Racing. Al-Anabi Racing consisted of Top Fuel driver Del Worsham and the driver Schumacher considers his biggest rival, Larry Dixon. Many fans and media members felt Schumacher would not have the success he had in previous years as Johnson was the Army Top Fuel team's tuner during his run of five consecutive titles.

=== 2009 season ===
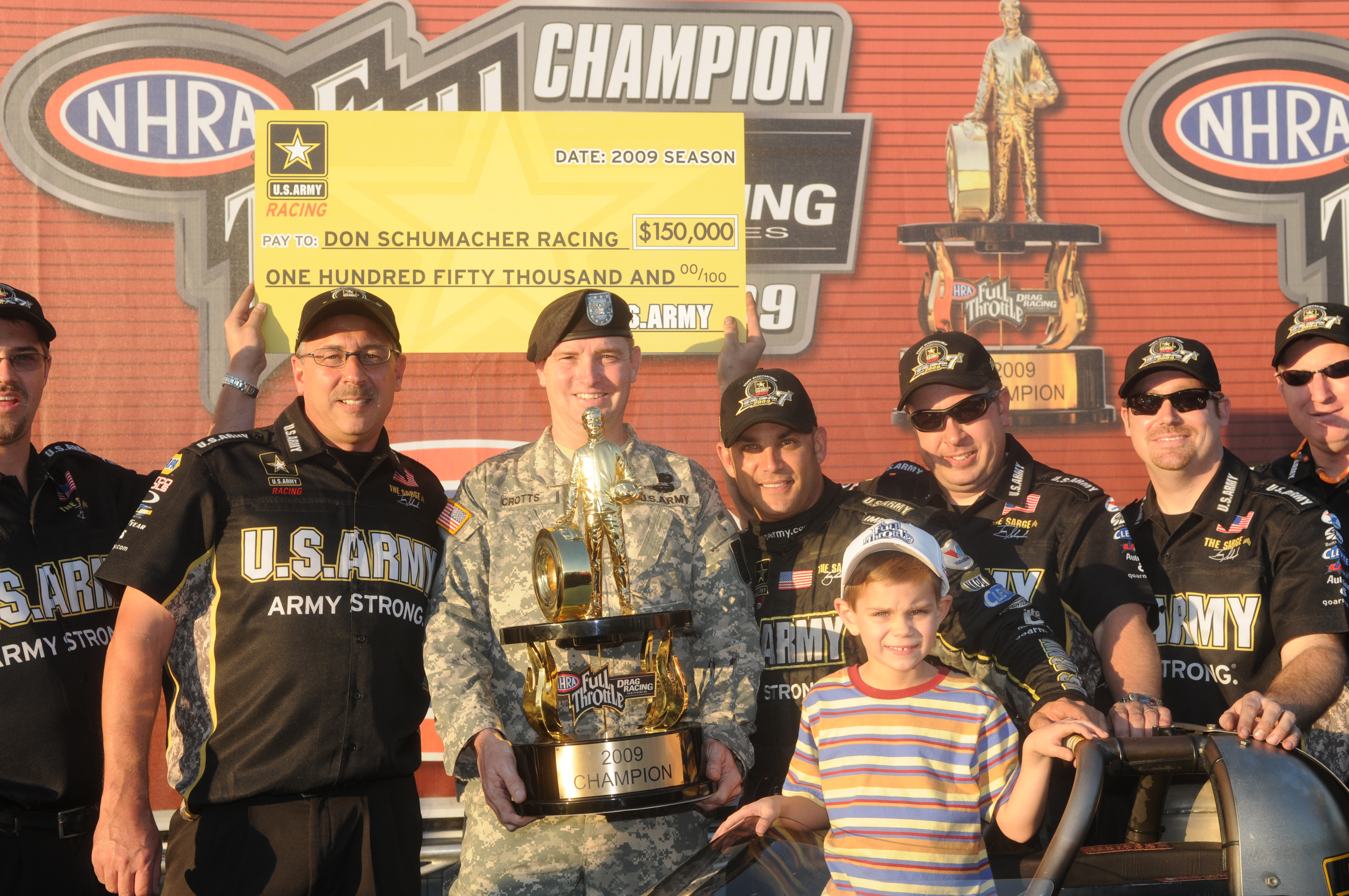
Tony Schumacher (center, to the right of the U.S. Army soldier) and crew with 2009 Top Fuel championship trophy

Schumacher met Dixon and Johnson in the semi-final round early in 2009 at The Strip in Las Vegas, beating his former crew chief's new driver. Schumacher went on to win the event and won the following race in Houston.

Schumacher won the 2009 Top Fuel championship in dramatic fashion. He was in contention coming into the last race of the season at Pomona, California. He was tied for first place with his longtime and biggest rival, Larry Dixon. Third place was held by Schumacher's teammate, Cory McClenathan. Fourth place was held by Schumacher's other teammate, Antron Brown. In fifth place was Brandon Bernstein. By the end of qualifying, round 1, Dixon was in front by 1 point. At the end of the qualifying, round 2, Dixon was leading by 2 points. At the end of qualifying, round 3, Dixon was leading by 1 point. At the end of qualifying, round 4, Schumacher was leading by 2 points. Schumacher got ahead with the second quickest run in history, a 3.772. Bernstein was eliminated from the title in qualifying. Brown was eliminated in the 1st round when Schumacher got his round win. Brown was still in contention for the race win, though, and went to the semi-finals to face Schumacher. Dixon and Cory McClenathan squared off in round 2, with the loser being eliminated from the championship. Ultimately, Dixon advanced to the semis to race the strong rookie driver Spencer Massey. Massey defeated Dixon, which gave Schumacher the championship. Brown beat Schumacher in the semi-finals, though, and went on to win the race over Massey.

=== 2010 season ===
In 2010, Schumacher was in contention all year long but could not win the championship over his longtime rival Dixon. The Schumacher team as a whole finished 2nd, 3rd and 4th in Top Fuel. After the 2010 season, Cory McClenathan was released by the team and 2009 rookie of the year Spencer Massey took over his spot at the request of DSR team sponsor, Honeywell.

=== 2012 season ===
On April 15, 2012, at zMax Dragway, Schumacher was the first top fuel driver to reach the 330 m.p.h. mark in the 1,000 foot NHRA era. However, he did not keep the record long as Spencer Massey broke the record the same day going 332.18 m.p.h..

=== Later career ===
In early 2025, it was announced Schumacher would join Rick Ware Racing to run a part schedule that year with the hopes to running full time in the 2026 season.

== Accolades ==
Schumacher was inducted into the Motorsports Hall of Fame of America in 2025.

== Personal life ==
Schumacher is married to his wife, Summer. They have three children.
