= Frank Hawley =

Frank Hawley (born 1954 in London, Ontario, Canada) is a two-time World champion drag racing driver.

Hawley won seven National Hot Rod Association (NHRA) Top Fuel Funny Car and two Top Fuel Dragster national events during his ten-year drag racing career that included the 1982 and 1983 NHRA Funny Car World Championship. He was voted Car Craft magazine's "Driver of the year."

Hawley also served as a television sports commentator for ABC, TNN, and ESPN and authored two books on the sport of drag racing. Inducted into the Canadian Motorsport Hall of Fame in 1995, on the National Hot Rod Association Top 50 Drivers, 1951–2000, Hawley was ranked No.43.

In 1985, Hawley founded the world's first school for drag race driver's training - Frank Hawley's Drag Racing School. With Hawley as the lead instructor, the school offers classes all across the United States where drivers can earn their NHRA Competition License. Some of the classes offered include Super Comp, Super Gas, Top Dragster, Top Sportsman, Top Alcohol Dragster, Top Alcohol Funny Car, Pro Stock Bike as well as courses for those to license and train with Hawley in their own car.
