= Joe Amato (dragster driver) =

American dragster driver

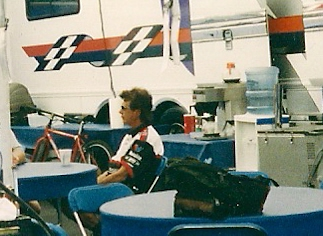
Amato relaxing in his pit area as an owner at the 2001 Southern Nationals at Atlanta Dragway in Commerce, Georgia, 2001

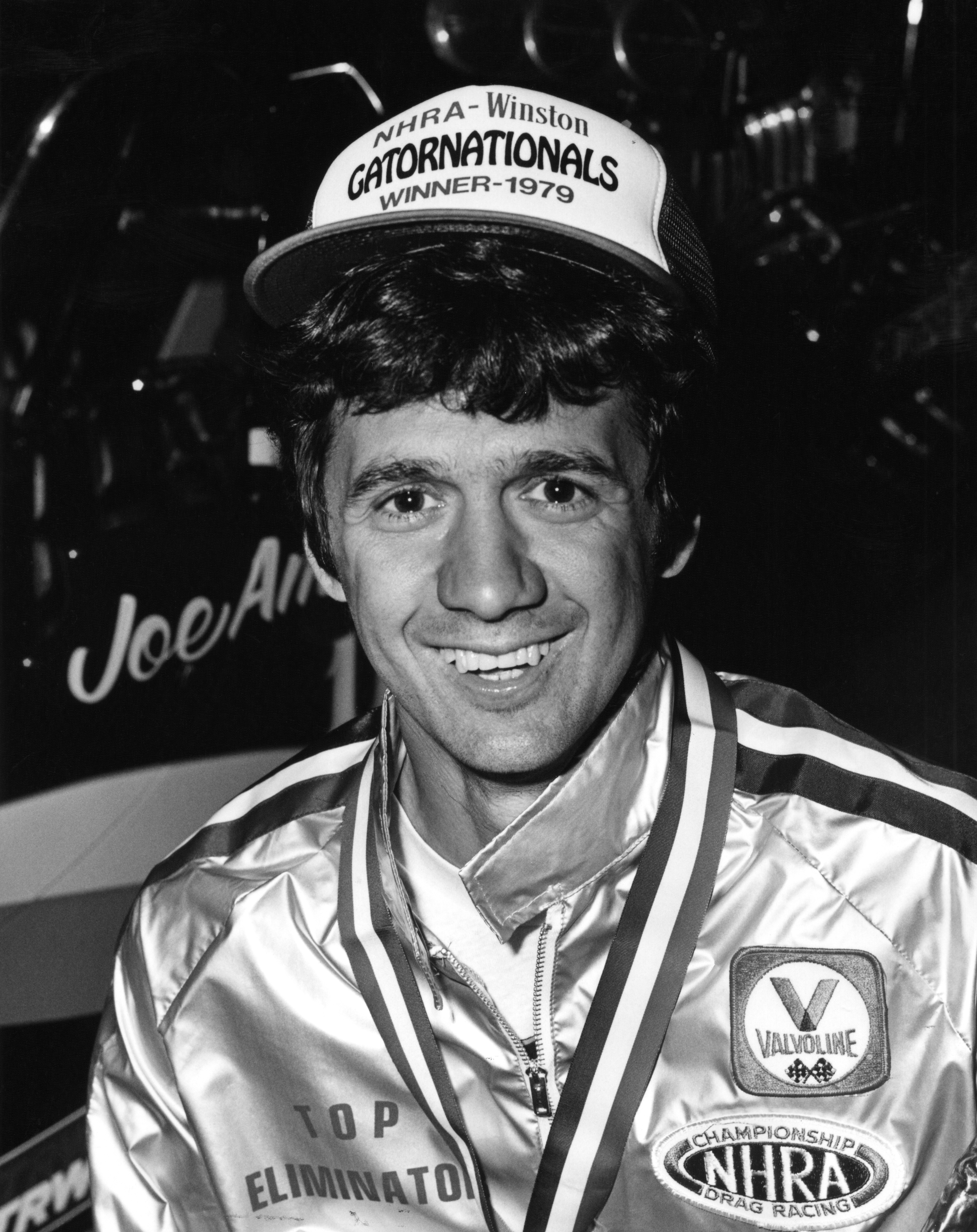
Amato after winning the 1979 Gatornationals

Joe Amato (born June 13, 1944) is an American dragster driver, who won the National Hot Rod Association's Top Fuel championship on five occasions and scored 52 event victories, most of them with crew chief Tim Richards. He was the first driver to exceed 260 mph (420 km/h) and 280 mph (450 km/h) in competition.

== Early life and education ==
Amato was born in Exeter, Pennsylvania, on June 13, 1944. He began racing cars as a teenager, when he worked at his family's auto parts store. He dropped out of high school to help run the store when his father had serious heart problems; eventually, Amato built the business into Keystone Automotive, a large and successful automotive wholesaler and distributor.

== Racing career ==
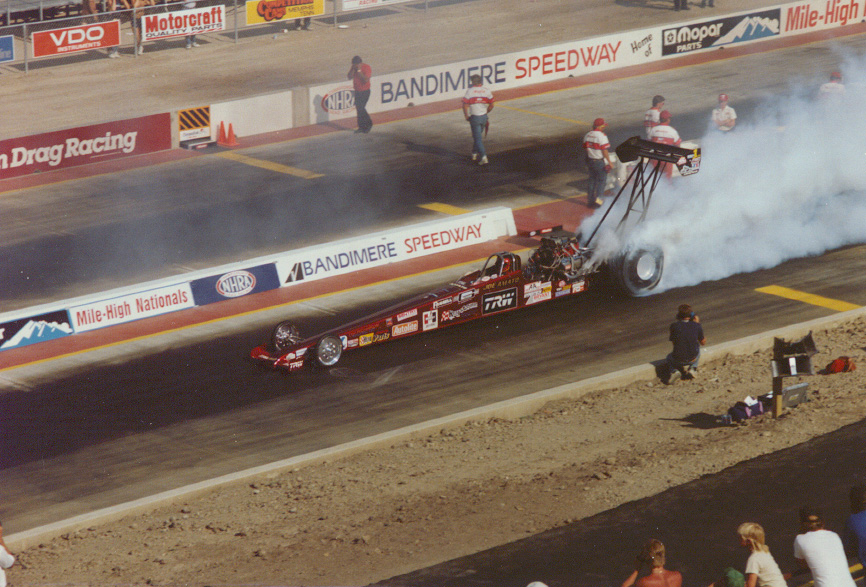
Amato dragster doing a burnout at the Mile High Nationals in the Denver

Between 1982 and 2000, Amato finished in the top-ten every year and, in 1983, earned his first Top Fuel victory in Montreal in 1983. His final career victory came in Reading, Pennsylvania in 2000.

Eye surgery forced him to retire from competitive driving at the end of the 2000 season. He then participated as a team owner until selling the business and retiring permanently in 2005.

Darrell Russell drove Amato's dragster from the 2001 NHRA Winter Nationals until he was killed in an accident at the 2004 Sears Craftsman Nationals at Gateway International Raceway in St. Louis. Morgan Lucas drove the car the remainder of 2004 and 2005, prior to Amato retiring.

On the National Hot Rod Association Top 50 Drivers, 1951–2000, Joe Amato was ranked No. 9.

Amato currently resides in Lackawanna County, Pennsylvania (Glenmaura, Montage Mountain) and West Palm Beach, Florida. Amato has married three times.

In 2008, Amato's record of five championships in the Top Fuel division was beaten by Tony Schumacher, who won his sixth championship that year.

Amato's corporate office is in Wilkes Barre, Pennsylvania.

In 2019, Amato participated in the 50th Gatornationals in a special series, Unfinished Business, where eight NHRA legends were paired up in identical street-legal Toyota Camry sedans wrapped to resemble classic liveries of the racers. He was eliminated in the semifinal round.

== Awards ==
- He was inducted into the International Motorsports Hall of Fame in 2005.
- He was inducted into the Motorsports Hall of Fame of America in 2004.
