= Scott Kalitta =

American drag racer (1962–2008)

- Born: February 18, 1962; Mt. Clemens, Michigan, U.S.
- Died: June 21, 2008 (aged 46); Old Bridge Township, New Jersey, U.S.
- Resting place: Skyway Memorial Gardens, Palmetto, Florida, U.S.
- Father: Connie Kalitta
- Relatives: Doug Kalitta (cousin)

NHRA Powerade Drag Racing Series
- Years active: 1982–1997; 1999; 2003–2008
- Championships: 2 (TF)
- Wins: 18

Championship titles
- 1994, 1995: NHRA Top Fuel Champion

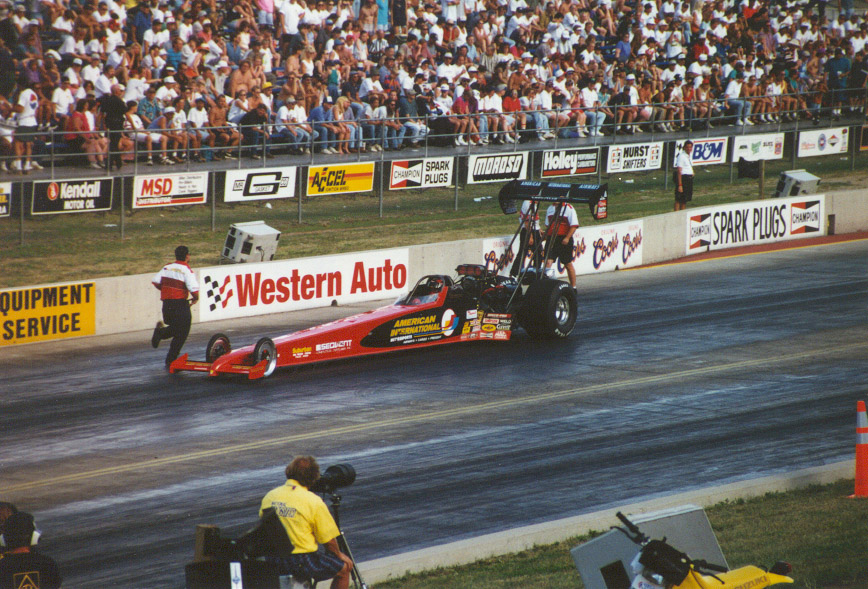
Kalitta's American International Top Fuel dragster

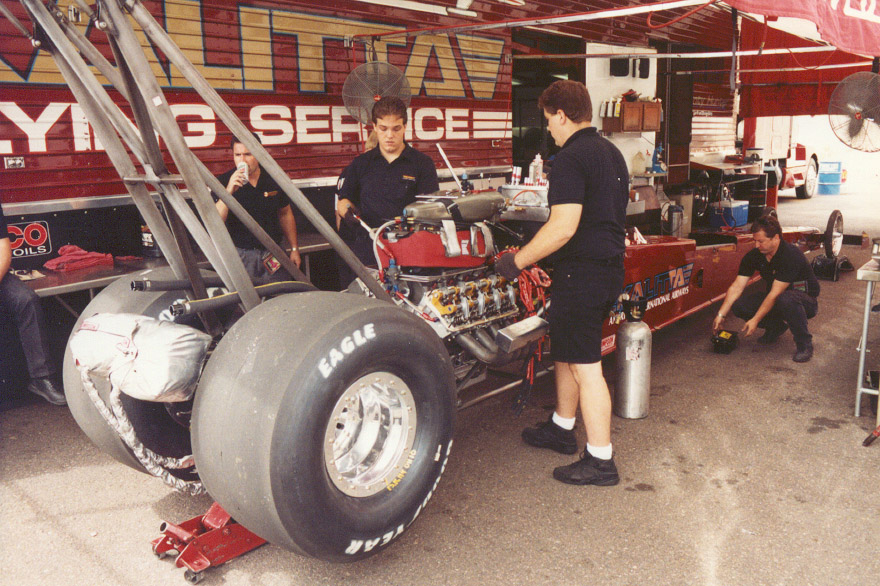
Kalitta's crew working on his dragster in the pits

Scott D. Kalitta (February 18, 1962 – June 21, 2008) was an American drag racer who competed in the Funny Car and Top Fuel classes in the National Hot Rod Association (NHRA) Full Throttle Drag Racing Series. He had 17 career Top Fuel wins and one career Funny Car win. At the time of his death due to an accident during race qualifying, he was one of 14 drivers to win in both divisions. He was the son of veteran NHRA driver and crew chief Connie Kalitta.

== Personal life ==
Kalitta made his home in Snead Island, Florida, with his wife, Kathy (married November, 1990), and two sons, Colin and Corey. He was a native of Ypsilanti, Michigan.

== Career ==
Kalitta's career began in 1982 at Old Bridge Township Raceway Park. His first career number-one qualifier happened at the Baton Rouge, Louisiana, event in 1988. He got his first win in 1989 in Funny Car at the event in Houston, Texas.

Kalitta moved to Top Fuel during the 1990s.

The next two years were big for Kalitta, as he won the Top Fuel championship both years. In 1994, he became the first Top Fuel driver to have four straight event wins (Columbus, Topeka, Denver, and Sonoma), and he won five events that season. He won six events and 45 rounds of competition in 1995 to win the championship. His 1996 season had him win the $100,000 Budweiser Shootout at Sonoma en route to a second-place points finish. He had the top speed at a series-best eight races that season. Kalitta won the Topeka event for a fourth straight year in 1997. He retired in October of that season.

Kalitta came back in 1999, making one final round in ten starts. Kalitta returned to Top Fuel in 2003 after a three-year layoff. He made two final rounds and set a speed record at 333.95 miles per hour (537.44 km/h), but did not certify the speed with a fast enough backup run to claim the national record. In 2004, he recorded one win in two final-round appearances. He was the top qualified at both Las Vegas events, and finished in the top five in season points. His 2005 season had him win two events.

For 2006, Kalitta returned to Funny Car in a Chevrolet Monte Carlo, but did not have as much success as he had in Top Fuel the previous two years. In the season, Kalitta drove his Kalitta Air-sponsored Funny Car to a 13th-place points finish, well behind eventual champion John Force. Toward the end of the year, Kalitta switched from the Monte Carlo to the Toyota Solara, which he ran for the remainder of his career.

Kalitta's 2007 Funny Car season was rather uneventful, as he qualified for 16 of 23 events in his DHL-sponsored Solara, and missed the inaugural NHRA Countdown to the Championship. His best finish of the season was a semifinals appearance at Denver in July. In 2008, he made his 36th and last final-round appearance at Route 66 Raceway in Joliet, Illinois, losing to Tony Pedregon in the final, two weeks before his death.

== Death ==
On June 21, 2008, Kalitta was fatally injured during the final round of qualifying for the 2008 Lucas Oil NHRA SuperNationals at Old Bridge Township Raceway Park in Englishtown, New Jersey. Kalitta's Funny Car was traveling about 300 mph (480 km/h) when the engine exploded in flames near the finish line. The parachutes were damaged and failed to slow the vehicle. According to the New Jersey State Police official news release, evidence discovered in Kalitta's lane revealed that he had applied mechanical braking and maintained steering control of the vehicle throughout the 2,235-foot-long (681 m) "shutdown" portion of the racetrack. Post-crash examination of the vehicle further revealed the clutch system to be locked, maintaining engine power to the rear wheels. Witnesses and audio recordings reveal the vehicle's engine was firing throughout the shutdown portion of the racetrack, which further reinforced the fact that the vehicle's engine was still providing power for some time. Kalitta's vehicle reached the end of the paved race track and went through a sand trap at around 125 mph (201 km/h). The vehicle went over the concrete retaining wall. The vehicle continued forward and hit a piece of heavy equipment, which was positioned outside the "run-off" area by the ESPN television crew. This impact caused catastrophic damage to the vehicle and additional separation of chassis components and the vehicle's engine. The largest portion of the race vehicle came to rest in a grassy area 250 feet (76 m) south of the shutdown area. Kalitta was contained in this portion of the race vehicle and had sustained fatal blunt-force injuries. A review of information provided by Delphi, which was recorded by accelerometers mounted to the vehicle, revealed multiple impacts producing over 100 g, with some approaching or exceeding 200 g. He was transported to the Old Bridge Division of Raritan Bay Medical Center, and was pronounced dead on arrival.

Post-mortem toxicological analysis of blood obtained from Scott Kalitta during his autopsy revealed the presence of ethanol at a level of 23 mg/dl. This converts to a .02% blood alcohol content percentage. This level, 25% of the legal limit for intoxication in New Jersey, remains in violation of NHRA rules (Section 1.7, I., B.1.), as well as N.J.S.A. Title 13 Chapter 62 New Jersey State Motor Vehicle Racetrack Regulations. In nitromethane-fueled classes that methanol poisoning is possible from the mandatory mix of methanol into the nitromethane (15% minimum methanol at the time), ethanol can be used to treat dangers from methanol poisoning that could happen from excessive breathing of methanol.

The NHRA said on Kalitta's death, "Scott shared the same passion for drag racing as his legendary father, Connie. He also shared the same desire to win, becoming a two-time series world champion. He left the sport for a very long period of time, to devote more time to his family, only to be driven to return to the drag strip to regain his championship form."

At the time of his accident, Kalitta was not qualified for the following day's national event in the Funny Car class. The run qualified him on the 13th place. The next day, in what would have been his opening elimination round event, the entire Kalitta team stood on the starting line on his designated side of the dragstrip as Robert Hight, who would have been his opponent, idled his car down the quarter-mile track as a sign of respect.

Kalitta is buried at the Skyway Memorial Gardens in Palmetto, Florida. He was survived by his wife and children.

== Legacy ==
On July 2, 2008, the NHRA shortened Top Fuel and Funny Car races to 1,000 feet (305 m) in response to the ongoing investigation, and extra safety measures were placed at all tracks, including padded retaining walls at the end of sand traps, replacing the polymer nets held up by concrete posts. Although unpopular with the fans, the 1,000-foot distance is the standard for all “AA Fuel” (nitromethane) powered categories (Top Fuel car, Top Fuel Motorcycle, and AA fuel Funny Car). The FIA shortened the Mantorp Park, Alastaro Circuit, and Tierp Arena rounds of the European Drag Racing Championship because of track concerns, but drag races at Hockenheimring and Santa Pod remained at the 1,320 feet (402 m) distance because of its length until the end of the 2011 season. Adelaide International Raceway became Australia's first 1,000-foot drag strip. In 2017, the International Hot Rod Association changed to 1,000-foot racing for its Top Fuel cars starting with the 2017–18 ACDelco Thunder Nationals (first IHRA Top Fuel race of the 2017–18 IHRA 400 Thunder season).

As a direct result of Kalitta's death, a solution was sought to eliminate engine backfire, the cause of the spectacular engine fires often associated with nitromethane burners. A solution was developed by Dave Lahey of Electromotion in Columbus, Ohio, with the help of 15-time Funny Car champion John Force, former Funny Car and Top Fuel champion Kenny Bernstein, and seven-time Top Fuel champion Tony Schumacher; they developed a sensor that in the event of an engine backfire will automatically shut down the fuel pump and deploy the parachutes. Although several NHRA drivers have expressed their displeasure at the introduction of the new sensor, they admit that it should reduce, if not eliminate, the circumstances that led to Kalitta's death. The device was made a mandatory safety requirement in 2009.
