= Car Craft =

American magazine

- November 2002 Cover of Car Craft
- Categories: Automobile magazine
- Frequency: Monthly
- Publisher: Motor Trend Group
- Total circulation: 201,061 (2013)
- Founded: 1953
- Final issue: March 2020
- Company: Source Interlink
- Country: USA
- Based in: Los Angeles
- Language: English
- Website: www.carcraft.com
- ISSN: 0008-6010

Car Craft was a magazine devoted to automobiles, hot rodding, and drag racing. The magazine was established in 1953 and published by the Motor Trend Group. It published articles directed at inexperienced and expert car mechanics, such as rebuilding a carburetor.

The motto of the magazine was Loud, Fast, Real, which emphasized its more budget-oriented approach to automobile building. When compared to similar magazines, Car Craft often featured vehicles built on a "real world" budget, with an emphasis on functionality over style. Sister publication Hot Rod overlapped to an extent on some of the same subject matter, however Hot Rod covered more professionally built vehicles.

One of the editors-in-chief was John Mcgann. Previous editors included Terry Cook, Rick Voegelin, Jon Asher, Jeff Smith, John Baechtel, Chuck Schifsky, Matt King, David Freiburger and Douglas Glad. Car Craft named an annual All-Star drag racing team each year plus a lifetime achievement award.

On December 9, 2019, MotorTrend publisher TEN Publishing announced that Car Craft, alongside 18 other magazines, would no longer be published. March 2020 was the final issue of the magazine.
