= Gary Beck =

American racing driver

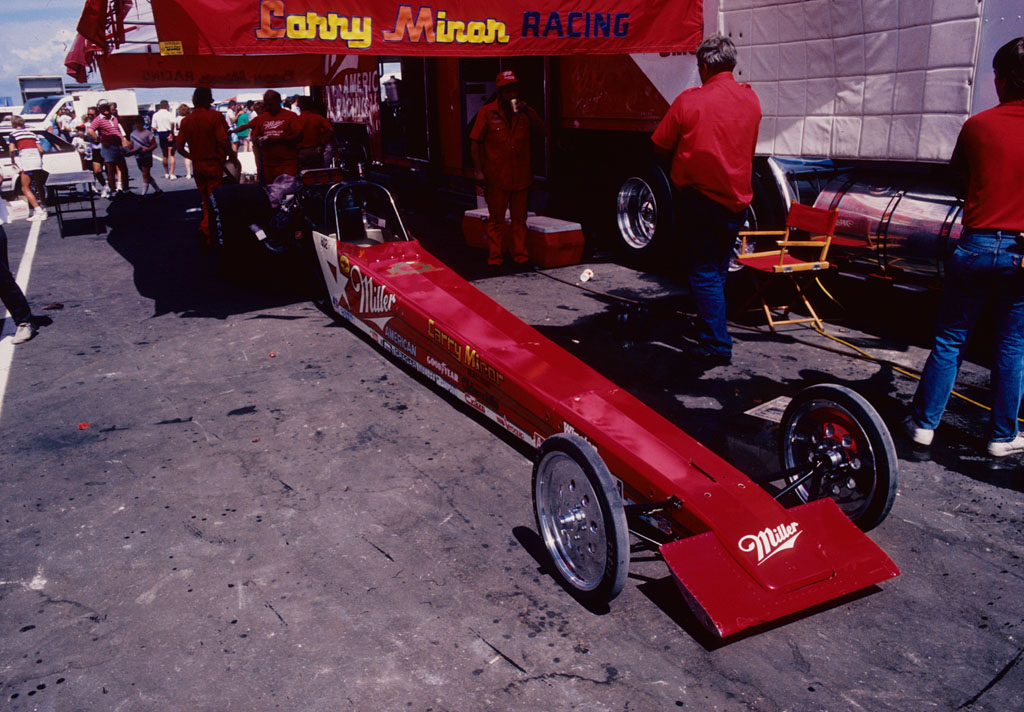
Beck's 1986 dragster

Gary Beck (born January 21, 1941) is a two-time World champion drag racing driver. Born in Seattle, Washington and raised in the United States, Beck married a Canadian and they made their home in her native Edmonton, Alberta. He competed in stock car racing before switching to drag racing.

A virtual unknown, in 1972, Beck abruptly came to international prominence when he won the National Hot Rod Association (NHRA) Top Fuel dragster title at the U.S. Nationals in Indianapolis, Indiana. His win marked the first of a number of important championships and in 1974, he drove his nitro-fueled dragster to a record setting three NHRA and two American Hot Rod Association (AHRA) titles and earned the first of his two World Championships. Beck was named driver of the year by Drag News and top fuel driver of the year by Car Craft. Among his 1975 victories, he took the Canadian Open Top Fuel championship.

In 1983, Beck dominated the Top Fuel class in drag racing, scoring 17 of the fastest 18 runs in Top Fuel history and capping off the multi-win season with his second World Championship. He retired from the NHRA tour in 1986, having won 19 Top Fuel titles plus multiple events on the IHRA and AHRA circuits. Inducted into the Canadian Motorsport Hall of Fame in 1999, on the National Hot Rod Association Top 50 Drivers, 1951–2000, Beck was ranked 24th.
