= Doug Kalitta =

American drag racing driver (born 1964)

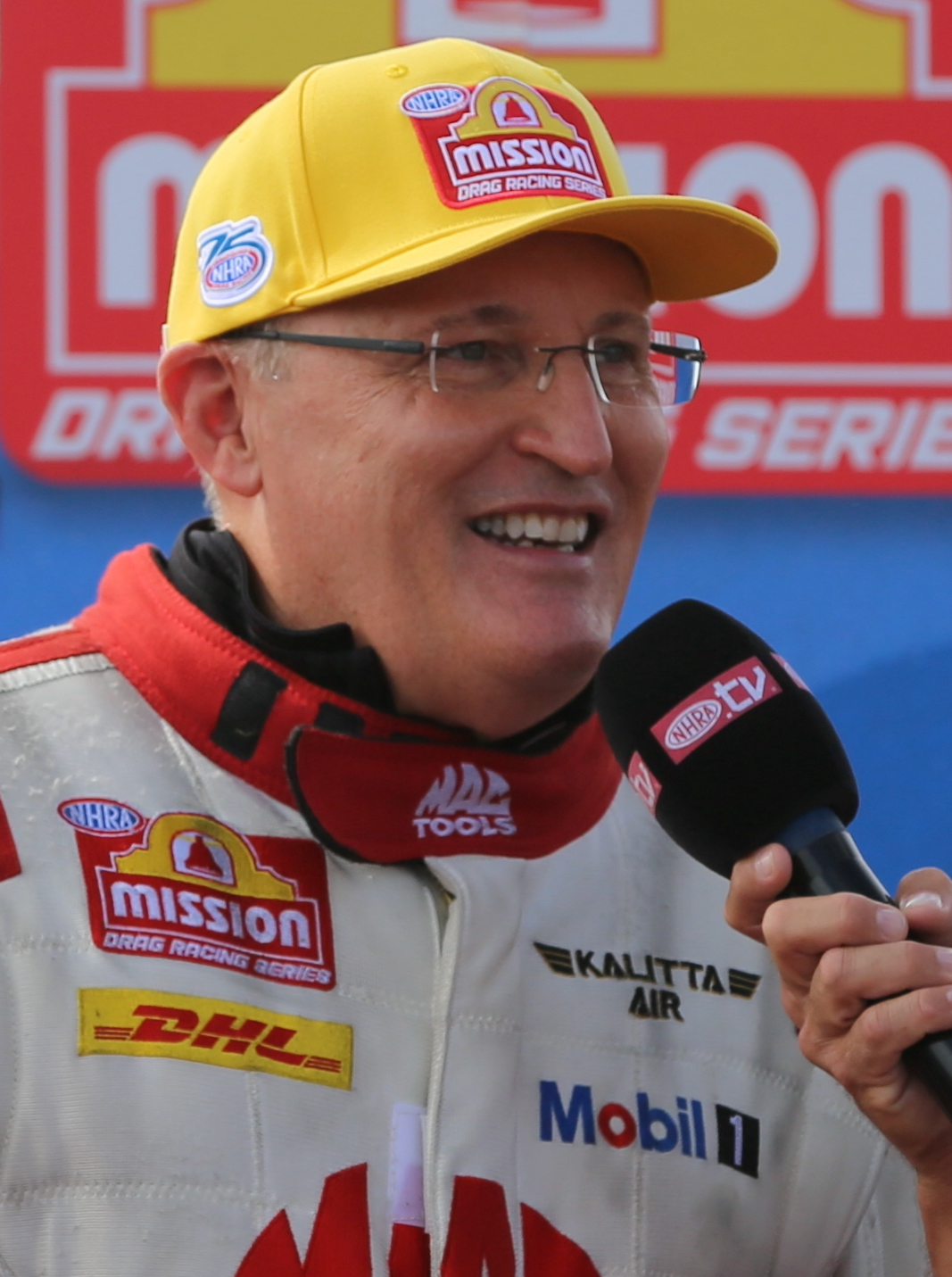
- Kalitta at Sonoma Raceway in 2026
- Born: August 20, 1964 (age 62)

NHRA Mission Foods Drag Racing Series career
- Debut season: 1998
- Current team: Kalitta Motorsports
- Crew chief: Alan Johnson
- Championships: 2 (TF)
- Wins: Win Total; 59; Final Round Appearances; 125
- Fastest laps: Best ET; 3.628 seconds; Best Speed; 342.98 mph (551.97 km/h)

Championship titles
- 2023, 2025: NHRA Top Fuel Champion

Awards
- 1998: Auto Club Road to the Future Award
- Statistics up to date as of November 15, 2025.

Doug Kalitta (born August 20, 1964) is an American auto racing driver from Ypsilanti, Michigan, and owner of airline Kalitta Charters. He started racing in open-wheel cars on an oval. Kalitta won the 1994 USAC Midget rookie of the year title and the 1994 USAC Sprint car championship. He moved to drag racing in 1998, and is the 2023 and 2025 NHRA Mission Foods Drag Racing Series (Top Fuel) champion.

== Open wheel oval racing ==
Kalitta formerly raced in USAC events. He was the 1991 USAC rookie of the year in the midget series, and won the 1994 championship in the sprint car category. Kalitta won 21 USAC events: 14 in midget races and seven in sprint competitions.

== Drag racing ==
In 1998, Kalitta joined the NHRA, becoming a top fuel drag racer. Kalitta finished second in the top fuel points race in 2003, 2004, 2006, 2016 and 2019. He is fourth on the all-time top fuel wins list; with 60 victories. Kalitta also has 126 career final round appearances; with Doug also winning the championship for top fuel in 2023 and 2025. At the 2026 NHRA Four Wide Nationals at ZMax Dragway, Kalitta set a new personal fastest run with a speed of 342.98 mph.

== Personal life ==
Kalitta has a wife, Josie Kalitta, a son Mitchell Kalitta, and a daughter Avery Ciorbu, who is a professional soccer player for Racing Louisville FC. Kalitta's father is the now-deceased Doug Kalitta Sr., and he is the nephew of Connie Kalitta, a member of the Motorsports Hall of Fame of America. Scott Kalitta, an NHRA driver who died on June 21, 2008, in a racing accident, was his cousin. He owns the airline Kalitta Charters.
