= 2000 NHRA Winston Drag Racing Series season =

2000 NHRA Drag Racing Season
- League: NHRA
- Sport: Drag racing
- Champions: Gary Scelzi (Top Fuel); John Force (Funny Car); Jeg Coughlin Jr. (Pro Stock); Angelle Seeling (Pro Stock Bike); Bob Panella Jr. (Pro Stock Truck)

NHRA seasons
- ← 1999 2001 →

The NHRA Winston Drag Racing Series was a series of drag racing races which took place from 1975 and 2001. The series is now known as the NHRA Mission Foods Drag Racing Series. It is the top competition division of the NHRA.

These are the results for the 2000 Season.

== Schedule ==
2000 NHRA Winston Drag Racing Series Schedule
Date	Race	Site	Winners				
Date	Race	Site	Top Fuel	Funny Car	Pro Stock	Pro Stock Bike	Pro Stock Truck
February 3–6	AutoZone Winternationals	Pomona, California	Gary Scelzi	Jerry Toliver	Jeg Coughlin Jr.	N/A	Bob Panella Jr.
February 24–27	Checker Schuck's Kragen Nationals Presented By Pennzoil	Phoenix, Arizona	Tony Schumacher	John Force	Jeg Coughlin Jr.	N/A	N/A
March 16–19	Mac Tools Gatornationals	Gainesville, Florida	Doug Kalitta	Jerry Toliver	Warren Johnson	David Schultz	Randy Daniels
April 6–9	SummitRacing.com NHRA Nationals	Las Vegas, Nevada	Kenny Bernstein	Jim Epler	Jeg Coughlin Jr.	Angelle Seeling	Bob Panella Jr.
April 13–16	O'Reilly Nationals Presented By Pennzoil	Houston, Texas	Larry Dixon	Bob Gilbertson	Jeg Coughlin Jr.	N/A	Randy Daniels
April 27–30	Moto1.Net Nationals Presented By Chevrolet	Richmond, Virginia	Larry Dixon	John Force	Jeg Coughlin Jr.	N/A	Randy Daniels
May 4–7	Advance Auto Parts NHRA Southern Nationals	Atlanta, Georgia	Gary Scelzi	John Force	Jeg Coughlin Jr.	Angelle Seeling	Randy Daniels
May 18–21 Original Weekend // Rescheduled Weekend September 8–9 Moved Due To Rain	Matco Tools Spring SuperNationals Presented By Racing Champions	Englishtown, New Jersey	Doug Kalitta	Cruz Pedregon	Jeg Coughlin Jr.	Angelle Seeling	N/A
May 25–28	Castrol Nationals Presented By O'Reilly Auto Parts	Dallas, Texas	Gary Scelzi	John Force	V. Gaines	Matt Hines	N/A
June 1–4	Prestone Route 66 Nationals	Chicago, Illinois	Gary Scelzi	Del Worsham	Ron Krisher	Antron Brown	Bob Panella Jr.
June 15–18	Pontiac Excitement Nationals Presented By Summit Racing	Columbus, Ohio	Tony Schumacher	Tony Pedregon	Mark Pawuk	Angelle Seeling	Randy Daniels
June 22–24	Sears Craftsman NHRA Nationals	Madison, Illinois	Gary Scelzi	Jerry Toliver	Ron Krisher	Matt Hines	John Coughlin
July 7-9	Winston No Bull Showdown	Bristol, Tennessee	Cory McClenathan	Class Competed With Top Fuel	Troy Coughlin	Matt Hines	Bob Panella Jr.
July 13–16	Mopar Parts Mile-High NHRA Nationals	Denver, Colorado	Joe Amato	Whit Bazemore	Kurt Johnson	Angelle Seeling	N/A
July 28–30	Prolong Super Lubricants NHRA Northwest Nationals Presented By NAPA Auto Parts	Seattle, Washington	Gary Scelzi	John Force	Richie Stevens	N/A	N/A
August 4–6	Fram Autolite NHRA Nationals	Sonoma, California	Doug Kalitta	John Force	Kurt Johnson	N/A	N/A
August 17–20	Colonel's Truck Accessories NHRA Nationals	Brainerd, Minnesota	Tony Schumacher	John Force	Kurt Johnson	Antron Brown	N/A
August 30-September 4	U.S. Nationals	Indianapolis, Indiana	Tony Schumacher	Jim Epler	Jeg Coughlin Jr.	Antron Brown	Bob Panella Jr.
September 14–17	NHRA Keystone Nationals	Reading, Pennsylvania	Joe Amato	Bruce Sarver	Kurt Johnson	Matt Hines	N/A
September 28-October 1	Advance Auto Parts Nationals	Topeka, Kansas	Gary Scelzi	John Force	Jeg Coughlin Jr.	N/A	Bob Panella Jr.
October 5–8	AutoZone NHRA Nationals Presented By Pennzoil	Memphis, Tennessee	Gary Scelzi	Ron Capps	Jeg Coughlin Jr.	N/A	Mike Coughlin
October 19–22 Original Weekend // November 3–4 Rescheduled Weekend Moved Because Of Rain	O'Reilly Fall Nationals Presented By Castrol Syntec	Dallas, Texas	Cory McClenathan	John Force	Kurt Johnson	N/A	Steve Johns
October 26–29	Matco Tools SuperNationals Presented By Racing Champions	Houston, Texas	Kenny Bernstein	Tony Pedregon	Warren Johnson	David Schultz	N/A
November 9–12	Automobile Club of Southern California NHRA Finals	Pomona, California	Gary Scelzi	John Force	Bruce Allen	Tony Mullen	Greg Stanfield
