= 2005 NHRA Powerade Drag Racing Series season =

2005 NHRA Drag Racing Season
- League: NHRA
- Sport: Drag racing
- Champions: Tony Schumacher (TF); Gary Scelzi (FC); Greg Anderson (PS); Andrew Hines (PSM)

NHRA seasons
- ← 2004 2006 →

The NHRA Powerade Drag Racing Series was a series of drag racing events that took place in the USA between 2002 and 2008. The series, taking place each year, is now known as the NHRA Mission Foods Drag Racing Series. It is the top competition division of the NHRA.

The following are the results of the 2005 season.

== Schedule ==
2005 NHRA Powerade Schedule
Date	Race	Site	Winners			
Date	Race	Site	Top Fuel Dragster	Funny Car	Pro Stock	Pro Stock Motorcycle
February 10–13	CARQUEST Auto Parts NHRA Winternationals	Pomona, California	Scott Kalitta	Tommy Johnson Jr.	Dave Connolly	N/A
February 25–27	Checker Shucks Kragen Nationals	Phoenix, Ariz.	Tony Schumacher	John Force	Allen Johnson	N/A
March 17–20	ACDelco NHRA Gatornationals	Gainesville, Fla	Doug Kalitta	Whit Bazemore	Jason Line	Steve Johnson
April 8–10	O'Reilly NHRA Spring Nationals	Houston, Texas	Tony Schumacher	Robert Hight	Warren Johnson	Karen Stoffer
April 14–17	SummitRacing.com NHRA Nationals	Las Vegas, Nev.	Larry Dixon	Whit Bazemore	Dave Connolly	N/A
April 29-May 1	O’Reilly NHRA Thunder Valley Nationals	Bristol, Tenn.	Doug Kalitta	Gary Scelzi	Warren Johnson	N/A
May 12–15	Summit Racing Equipment NHRA Southern Nationals	Atlanta, Ga.	Doug Kalitta	John Force	Greg Anderson	GT Tonglet
May 19–22	Pontiac Performance NHRA Nationals	Columbus, Ohio	Tony Schumacher	John Force	Greg Anderson	Ryan Schnitz
May 26–29	O'Reilly NHRA Summer Nationals	Topeka, Kansas	Dave Grubnic	John Force	Greg Anderson	N/A
June 9–12	Carquest Auto Parts NHRA Nationals	Chicago, Ill.	Scott Kalitta	Gary Scelzi	Jason Line	Chip Ellis
June 16–19	K&N Filters SuperNationals	Englishtown, N.J.	Larry Dixon	Del Worsham	Jason Line	Antron Brown
June 24–26	Sears Craftsman NHRA Nationals	Madison, Ill.	Brandon Bernstein	Ron Capps	Kurt Johnson	Angelle Sampey
July 15–17	Mopar Mile-High NHRA Nationals	Denver, Colo.	Tony Schumacher	Robert Hight	Warren Johnson	Ryan Schnitz
July 22–24	Shuck's Auto Supply NHRA Nationals	Seattle, Wash.	Brandon Bernstein	Eric Medlen	Kurt Johnson	N/A
July 29–31	Fram Autolite NHRA Nationals	Sonoma, Calif.	Doug Kalitta	Gary Scelzi	Greg Anderson	Andrew Hines
August 11–14	Lucas Oil NHRA Nationals	Brainerd, Minn.	Doug Kalitta	Eric Medlen	Kurt Johnson	GT Tonglet
August 19–21	O'Reilly Mid-South Nationals	Memphis, Tenn.	Rod Fuller	Eric Medlen	Greg Anderson	Andrew Hines
August 31-September 5	Mac Tools U.S. Nationals	Indianapolis, Ind.	Larry Dixon	Del Worsham	Greg Anderson	Steve Johnson
September 15–18	Toyo Tires NHRA Nationals	Reading, Pa.	Tony Schumacher	Tony Pedregon	Greg Anderson	Angelle Sampey
September 29-October 2	Ameriquest Mortgage NHRA Nationals	Joliet, IL	Tony Schumacher	Ron Capps	Jason Line	N/A
September 22–25 Rained out to October 7–9	O’Reilly NHRA Fall Nationals	Dallas, Texas	Tony Schumacher	John Force	Greg Anderson	N/A
October 20–23	ACDelco Las Vegas NHRA Nationals	Las Vegas, Nev.	Tony Schumacher	Ron Capps	Kurt Johnson	Chip Ellis
November 3–6	Automobile Club of Southern California NHRA Finals	Pomona, California	Tony Schumacher	Tony Pedregon	Jeg Coughlin	Ryan Schnitz
