= 2001 NHRA Winston Drag Racing Series season =

2001 NHRA Drag Racing Season
- League: NHRA
- Sport: Drag racing
- Champions: Kenny Bernstein (Top Fuel); John Force (Funny Car); Warren Johnson (Pro Stock); Angelle Savoie (Pro Stock Bike); Bob Panella Jr. (Pro Stock Truck)

NHRA seasons
- ← 2000 2002 →

The NHRA Winston Drag Racing Series was a series of drag racing races which took place from 1975 and 2001. The series is now known as the NHRA Mission Foods Drag Racing Series. It is the top competition division of the NHRA. This also was the 50th season for the sport which was celebrated all season as well with a Top 50 list of drivers was revealed throughout the year. It was also the final year with Winston as the title sponsor of the top racing series in the league.

It was also the last of 4 seasons with the Pro Stock Truck class which was announced mid year that the class would be discounted.

These are the results for the 2001 Season.

== Schedule ==
2001 NHRA Winston Drag Racing Series Schedule
Date	Race	Site	Winners				
Date	Race	Site	Top Fuel	Funny Car	Pro Stock	Pro Stock Bike	Pro Stock Truck
February 1–4	K&N Filters Winternationals	Pomona, California	Darrell Russell	Bruce Sarver	Kurt Johnson	N/A	Randy Daniels
February 15-18	Checker Schuck's Kragen Nationals Presented By Pennzoil	Phoenix, Arizona	Doug Kalitta	John Force	Warren Johnson	N/A	N/A
March 15–18 (Original Weekend) / (April 20-21 Rescheduled Weekend) It Moved Because Of Rain	Mac Tools Gatornationals	Gainesville, Florida	Larry Dixon	John Force	Jeg Coughlin	Matt Hines	Greg Stanfield
March 22–25	O'Reilly Nationals Presented By Pennzoil	Houston, Texas	Mike Dunn	Del Worsham	Warren Johnson	Angelle Savoie	Randy Daniels
April 5–8	SummitRacing.com NHRA Nationals	Las Vegas, Nevada	Kenny Bernstein	Tommy Johnson Jr.	Jeg Coughlin	N/A	Bob Panella Jr.
April 27-29	Mac Tools Thunder Valley NHRA Nationals	Bristol, Tennessee	Doug Kalitta	Ron Capps	Greg Anderson	N/A	N/A
May 3–6	Advance Auto Parts NHRA Southern Nationals	Atlanta, Georgia	Mike Dunn	Frank Pedregon	Jim Yates	Antron Brown	Bob Panella Jr.
May 17–20	Matco Tools SuperNationals Presented By Racing Champions	Englishtown, New Jersey	Kenny Bernstein	Tony Pedregon	Richie Stevens Jr.	Matt Hines	N/A
May 24–27	Advance Auto Parts Nationals	Topeka, Kansas	Kenny Bernstein	Tony Pedregon	Ron Krisher	N/A	Don Smith
May 31-June 3	Lucas Oil Products NHRA Nationals	Chicago, Illinois	Kenny Bernstein	Del Worsham	Mike Edwards	Antron Brown	Scott Perin
June 14-17	Pontiac Excitement Nationals Presented By Summit Racing	Columbus, Ohio	Larry Dixon	John Force	Warren Johnson	Angelle Savoie	Bob Panella Jr.
June 21–24	Sears Craftsman NHRA Nationals	Madison, Illinois	Doug Kalitta	Tony Pedregon	Warren Johnson	GT Tonglet	Taylor Lastor
July 5-7	Pep Boys NHRA 50th Anniversary Nationals Presented By American Racing Wheels	Pomona, California	Doug Herbert	John Force	Jeg Coughlin Jr.	Angelle Savoie	N/A
July 19–22	Mopar Parts Mile-High NHRA Nationals	Denver, Colorado	Larry Dixon	John Force	Warren Johnson	Angelle Savoie	N/A
July 27–29	Prolong Super Lubricants NHRA Northwest Nationals Presented By NAPA Auto Parts	Seattle, Washington	Gary Scelzi	Whit Bazemore	Mark Osborne	N/A	N/A
August 3-5	Fram Autolite NHRA Nationals	Sonoma, California	Kenny Bernstein	Del Worsham	Tom Martino	N/A	N/A
August 16–19	Rugged Liner NHRA Nationals	Brainerd, Minnesota	Larry Dixon	Ron Capps	Bruce Allen	Antron Brown	N/A
August 29-September 3	Mac Tools U.S. Nationals	Indianapolis, Indiana	Larry Dixon	Whit Bazemore	Greg Anderson	Angelle Savoie	Mike Coughlin
September 13-16 (Original Weekend) / (October 4-7 Rescheduled Weekend) Moved Due To September 11 Attacks	Pep Boys NHRA Nationals Presented By Greased Lightning	Reading, Pennsylvania	Gary Scelzi	John Force	Troy Coughlin	Angelle Savoie	N/A
September 20-23	AutoZone NHRA Nationals Presented By Pennzoil	Memphis, Tennessee	Kenny Bernstein	Gary Densham	George Marnell	N/A	Mike Coughlin
September 27-30	NHRA Nationals	Joliet, Illinois	Kenny Bernstein	Whit Bazemore	Warren Johnson	N/A	Taylor Lastor
October 18-21	O'Reilly Fall Nationals Presented By Castrol Syntec	Dallas, Texas	Larry Dixon	Gary Densham	V. Gaines	N/A	Bob Panella Jr.
October 25–28	ACDelco Las Vegas NHRA Nationals	Las Vegas, Nevada	Darrell Russell	Ron Capps	Mark Pawuk	Shawn Gann	N/A
November 8–11	Automobile Club of Southern California NHRA Finals	Pomona, California	Kenny Bernstein	Del Worsham	Bruce Allen	Angelle Savoie	Mike Coughlin
