= 2004 NHRA Powerade Drag Racing Series season =

2004 NHRA Drag Racing Season
- League: NHRA
- Sport: Drag racing
- Champions: Tony Schumacher (TF); John Force (FC); Greg Anderson (PS); Andrew Hines (PSM)

NHRA seasons
- ← 2003 2005 →

The NHRA Powerade Drag Racing Series was a series of drag racing events that took place in the USA between 2002 and 2008. The series, taking place each year, is now known as the NHRA Mission Foods Drag Racing Series. It is the top competition division of the NHRA.

The following are the results of the 2004 season.

== Schedule ==
2004 NHRA Powerade Schedule
Date	Race	Site	Winners			
Date	Race	Site	Top Fuel	Funny Car	Pro Stock	Pro Stock Motorcycle
February 27–29	K&N Filters Winternationals	Pomona, California	Tony Schumacher	Jerry Toliver	Greg Anderson	N/A
March 5–7	Checker Shucks Kragen Nationals	Phoenix, Ariz.	Brandon Bernstein	Del Worsham	Kurt Johnson	N/A
March 18–21	Mac Tools Gatornationals	Gainesville, Fla	Tony Schumacher	Del Worsham	Greg Anderson	Andrew Hines
April 1–4	SummitRacing.com NHRA Nationals	Las Vegas, Nev.	Tony Schumacher	Phil Burkhart	Greg Anderson	N/A
April 15–18	O'Reilly NHRA Spring Nationals	Houston, Texas	Brandon Bernstein	Tim Wilkerson	Greg Anderson	Karen Stoffer
April 30-May 2	O’Reilly NHRA Thunder Valley Nationals	Bristol, Tenn.	Tony Schumacher	John Force	Greg Anderson	N/A
May 13–16	Summit Racing Equipment NHRA Southern Nationals	Atlanta, Ga.	Cory McClenathan	Whit Bazemore	Greg Anderson	Angelle Sampey
May 20–23	Route 66 NHRA Nationals	Chicago, Ill.	Doug Kalitta	John Force	Jason Line	Shawn Gann
May 27–30	O'Reilly NHRA Summer Nationals	Topeka, Kansas	Brandon Bernstein	Whit Bazemore	Greg Anderson	N/A
June 10–13	Pontiac Excitement NHRA Nationals	Columbus, Ohio	Darrell Russell	Del Worsham	Greg Anderson	Andrew Hines
June 17–20	K&N Filters SuperNationals	Englishtown, N.J.	Larry Dixon	Gary Densham	Jason Line	Andrew Hines
June 25–27	Sears Craftsman NHRA Nationals	Madison, Ill.	Doug Kalitta	Gary Scelzi	Greg Anderson	Steve Johnson
July 16–18	Mopar Mile-High NHRA Nationals	Denver, Colo.	Scott Kalitta	Phil Burkart	Greg Anderson	Shawn Gann
July 23–25	CarQuest Auto Parts NHRA Nationals	Seattle, Wash.	Tony Schumacher	John Force	Greg Anderson	N/A
July 30 - Aug. 1	Fram Autolite NHRA Nationals	Sonoma, Calif.	Doug Kalitta	Tim Wilkerson	Greg Anderson	Angelle Sampey
August 12–15	Lucas Oil NHRA Nationals	Brainerd, Minn.	Tony Schumacher	Eric Medlen	Dave Connolly	Craig Treble
August 20–22	O'Reilly Mid-South Nationals	Memphis, Tenn.	Larry Dixon	John Force	Jason Line	Antron Brown
September 1–6	Mac Tools U.S. Nationals	Indianapolis, Ind.	Tony Schumacher	Gary Densham	Greg Anderson	Antron Brown
September 23–26	O’Reilly NHRA Fall Nationals	Dallas, Texas	Tony Schumacher	Del Worsham	Dave Connolly	N/A
September 30-October 3	CarQuest Auto Parts NHRA Nationals	Joliet, IL	Doug Herbert	Del Worsham	Dave Connolly	N/A
October 8–10	Lucas Oil NHRA Nationals	Reading, Pa.	Tony Schumacher	Gary Scelzi	Jason Line	Angelle Sampey
October 28–31	ACDelco Las Vegas NHRA Nationals	Las Vegas, Nev.	Doug Kalitta	Gary Scelzi	Greg Anderson	Chip Ellis
November 3–6	Automobile Club of Southern California NHRA Finals	Pomona, California	Tony Schumacher	John Force	Greg Anderson	Angelle Sampey
