= 2003 NHRA Powerade Drag Racing Series season =

2003 NHRA Drag Racing Season
- League: NHRA
- Sport: Drag racing
- Champions: Larry Dixon (TF); Tony Pedregon (FC); Greg Anderson (PS); Geno Scali (PSM)

NHRA seasons
- ← 2002 2004 →

The NHRA Powerade Drag Racing Series was a series of drag racing events that took place in the USA between 2002 and 2008. The series, taking place each year, is now known as the NHRA Mission Foods Drag Racing Series. It is the top competition division of the NHRA.

These are the following results of the 2003 season.

== Schedule ==
2003 NHRA Powerade Schedule
Date	Race	Site	Winners			
Date	Race	Site	Top Fuel	Funny Car	Pro Stock	Pro Stock Motorcycle
February 6–9	K&N Filters Winternationals	Pomona, California	Larry Dixon	Tony Pedregon	Warren Johnson	N/A
February 20–23	Checker Shucks Kragen Nationals	Phoenix, Ariz.	Brandon Bernstein	Ron Capps	Greg Anderson	N/A
March 13–16	Mac Tools Gatornationals	Gainesville, Fla	Brandon Bernstein	Gary Densham	Kurt Johnson	Angelle Savoie
April 3–6	SummitRacing.com NHRA Nationals	Las Vegas, Nev.	Larry Dixon	Tony Pedregon	Greg Anderson	N/A
April 10–13	O'Reilly NHRA Spring Nationals	Houston, Texas	Doug Kalitta	Tony Pedregon	Kurt Johnson	Angelle Savoie
April 25-April 27	O’Reilly NHRA Thunder Valley Nationals	Bristol, Tenn.	Brandon Bernstein (3)	Del Worsham	Kurt Johnson	N/A
May 1–4	Summit Racing Equipment NHRA Southern Nationals	Atlanta, Ga.	Larry Dixon	Tony Pedregon	Warren Johnson	Geno Scali
May 15–18	K&N Filters SuperNationals	Englishtown, N.J.	Doug Kalitta	Whit Bazemoe	Greg Anderson	Shawn Gann
May 22–25	O'Reilly NHRA Summer Nationals	Topeka, Kansas	Larry Dixon	Tony Pedregon	Greg Anderson	N/A
May 29-June 1	Route 66 NHRA Nationals	Chicago, Ill.	Tony Schumacher	Whit Bazemore	Kurt Johnson (4)	Angelle Savoie (3)
June 12–15	Pontiac Excitement NHRA Nationals	Columbus, Ohio	Larry Dixon	Tony Pedregon	Greg Anderson	Fred Collis
June 26–29	Sears Craftsman NHRA Nationals	Madison, Ill.	Doug Kalitta	Del Worsham	Ron Krisher	Geno Scali
July 18–20	Mopar Mile-High NHRA Nationals	Denver, Colo.	Larry Dixon	John Force	Warren Johnson	Blaine Hale
July 25–27	CarQuest Auto Parts NHRA Nationals	Seattle, Wash.	Larry Dixon	John Force	Greg Anderson	N/A
August 1–3	Fram Autolite NHRA Nationals	Sonoma, Calif.	Larry Dixon (8)	Gary Scelzi	Jeg Coughlin	Geno Scali (3)
August 14–17	Lucas Oil NHRA Nationals	Brainerd, Minn.	Doug Kalitta (4)	Gary Densham (2)	Greg Anderson	Antron Brown
September 5–7	Mac Tools U.S. Nationals	Indianapolis, Ind.	Tony Schumacher	Tim Wilkerson	Greg Anderson	Reggie Showers
September 18–21	O'Reilly Mid-South Nationals	Memphis, Tenn.	Tony Schumacher	Whit Bazemore (3)	Greg Anderson	Reggie Showers (2)
September 25–28	CarQuest Auto Parts NHRA Nationals	Joliet, IL	Kenny Bernstein	Tony Pedregon	Jeg Coughlin (2)	N/A
October 3–5	Lucas Oil NHRA Nationals	Reading, Pa.	Tony Schumacher (4)	Tim Wilkerson (2)	Warren Johnson (4)	Michael Phillips
October 9–12	O’Reilly NHRA Fall Nationals	Dallas, Texas	Kenny Bernstein	John Force (3)	Greg Anderson	N/A
October 23–26	ACDelco Las Vegas NHRA Nationals	Las Vegas, Nev.	Kenny Bernstein	Tony Pedregon (8)	Greg Anderson	Craig Treble
November 6–9	Automobile Club of Southern California NHRA Finals	Pomona, California	Kenny Bernstein (4)	Del Worsham (3)	Greg Anderson (12)	Craig Treble (2)
