= 2002 NHRA Powerade Drag Racing Series season =

2002 NHRA Drag Racing Season
- League: NHRA
- Sport: Drag racing
- Champions: Larry Dixon (Top Fuel); John Force (Funny Car); Jeg Coughlin Jr. (Pro Stock); Angelle Savoie (Pro Stock Bike)

NHRA seasons
- ← 2001 2003 →

The NHRA Powerade Drag Racing Series was a series of drag racing races which took place from 2002 and 2008. The series is now known as the NHRA Mission Foods Drag Racing Series. It is the top competition division of the NHRA.

These are the results for the 2002 Season.

== Schedule ==
2002 NHRA Powerade Schedule
Date	Race	Site	Winners			
Date	Race	Site	Top Fuel	Funny Car	Pro Stock	Pro Stock Bike
February 7–10	K&N Filters Winternationals	Pomona, California	Larry Dixon	John Force	George Marnell	N/A
February 21-24	Checker Shucks Kragen Nationals	Phoenix, Arizona	Tony Schumacher	Del Worsham	Bruce Allen	N/A
March 14–17	Mac Tools Gatornationals	Gainesville, Florida	Larry Dixon	Tony Pedregon	Darrell Alderman	Craig Treble
April 4–7	SummitRacing.com NHRA Nationals	Las Vegas, Nevada	Larry Dixon	Gary Densham	Ron Krisher	N/A
April 11–14	O'Reilly Spring Nationals Presented By Pennzoil	Houston, Texas	Kenny Bernstein	John Force	Mike Edwards	Craig Treble
April 26-28	Mac Tools Thunder Valley NHRA Nationals	Bristol, Tennessee	Larry Dixon	Whit Bazemore	Warren Johnson	N/A
May 2–5	Summit Racing Equipment NHRA Southern Nationals Presented By Pontiac	Atlanta, Georgia	Larry Dixon	Whit Bazemore	Allen Johnson	Angelle Savoie
May 16–19	Matco Tools SuperNationals Presented By Racing Champions	Englishtown, New Jersey	Kenny Bernstein	Gary Densham	Greg Anderson	Antron Brown
May 23–26	O'Reilly NHRA Summer Nationals Presented By Castrol GTX	Topeka, Kansas	Darrell Russell	Tony Pedregon	Troy Coughlin	N/A
May 30-June 2	Chicagoland Dodge Dealers NHRA Nationals	Chicago, Illinois	Larry Dixon	Del Worsham	Bruce Allen	Angelle Savoie
June 13-16	Pontiac Excitement Nationals Presented By Summit Racing	Columbus, Ohio	Larry Dixon	Ron Capps	Greg Anderson	Craig Treble
June 27–30	Sears Craftsman NHRA Nationals	Madison, Illinois	Kenny Bernstein	John Force	Jeg Coughlin	Angelle Savoie
July 18–21	Mopar Parts Mile-High NHRA Nationals	Denver, Colorado	Darrell Russell	Del Worsham	Mike Edwards	Matt Hines
July 26–28	Lucas Oil NHRA Northwest Nationals	Seattle, Washington	Darrell Russell	Tony Pedregon	Jeg Coughlin	N/A
August 2-4	Fram Autolite NHRA Nationals	Sonoma, California	Doug Herbert	John Force	Larry Morgan	Craig Treble
August 15–18	Rugged Liner NHRA Nationals	Brainerd, Minnesota	Kenny Bernstein	John Force	Jeg Coughlin	Geno Scali
August 28-September 2	Mac Tools U.S. Nationals	Indianapolis, Indiana	Tony Schumacher	John Force	Jeg Coughlin	Angelle Savoie
September 12-15	Lucas Oil NHRA Nationals	Reading, Pennsylvania	Doug Kalitta	Tony Pedregon	Jim Yates	Angelle Savoie
September 19-22	O'Reilly NHRA Mid-South Nationals Presented By Pennzoil	Memphis, Tennessee	Larry Dixon	Tony Pedregon	Jeg Coughlin	N/A
September 26-29	Craftsman 75th Anniversary Nationals Presented By Racing Champions	Joliet, Illinois	Kenny Bernstein	Tony Pedregon	Jeg Coughlin	N/A
October 10-13	O'Reilly Fall Nationals Presented By Castrol Syntec	Dallas, Texas	Doug Kalitta	Del Worsham	Jeg Coughlin	N/A
October 24–27	ACDelco Las Vegas NHRA Nationals	Las Vegas, Nevada	Kenny Bernstein	John Force	Jeg Coughlin	Angelle Savoie
November 7–10	Automobile Club of Southern California NHRA Finals	Pomona, California	Cory McClenathan	John Force	Kurt Johnson	Matt Hines
