= 2007 NHRA Powerade Drag Racing Series season =

2007 NHRA Drag Racing Season
- League: NHRA
- Sport: Drag racing
- Champions: Tony Schumacher (TF); Tony Pedregon (FC); Jeg Coughlin (PS); Matt Smith (PSM)

NHRA seasons
- ← 2006 2008 →

The 2007 NHRA Powerade Drag Racing Season was the first NHRA season to include the Countdown to the Championship.

== Schedule ==
| Date | Race | Site | Winners | | | |
| Date | Race | Site | Top Fuel | Funny Car | Pro Stock | Pro Stock Motorcycle |
|---|---|---|---|---|---|---|
| February 8–11 | CARQUEST Auto Parts NHRA Winternationals | Pomona, California | J.R. Todd | Gary Scelzi | Greg Anderson | N/A |
| February 23–25 | Checker Shucks Kragen Nationals | Phoenix, Ariz. | Rod Fuller | Tony Pedregon | Kurt Johnson | N/A |
| March 15–18 | ACDelco NHRA Gatornationals | Gainesville, Fla | Tony Schumacher | Ron Capps | Greg Anderson | Karen Stoffer |
| March 30 - April 1 | O'Reilly NHRA Spring Nationals | Houston, Texas | J.R. Todd | Ron Capps | Jason Line | Angelle Sampey |
| April 12–15 | SummitRacing.com NHRA Nationals | Las Vegas, Nev. | Brandon Bernstein | Robert Hight | Greg Anderson | N/A |
| April 26–29 | Summit Racing Equipment NHRA Southern Nationals | Atlanta, Ga. | Brandon Bernstein | Robert Hight | Greg Anderson | Karen Stoffer |
| May 4–6 | O'Reilly NHRA Midwest Nationals | Madison, Ill. | Melanie Troxel | Ron Capps | Dave Connolly | Matt Smith |
| June 1–3 | O'Reilly NHRA Summer Nationals | Topeka, Kan. | Brandon Bernstein | Mike Ashley | Greg Anderson | N/A |
| June 7–10 | Torco Racing Fuels Route 66 NHRA Nationals | Chicago, Ill. | Larry Dixon | Gary Scelzi | Jeg Couglin | Andrew Hines |
| June 21–24 | ProCare Rx NHRA SuperNationals | Englishtown, N.J. | Larry Dixon | Tommy Johnson Jr. | Greg Anderson | Craig Treble |
| June 28 – July 1 | Summit Racing Equipment NHRA Nationals | Norwalk, Ohio | Tony Schumacher | Mike Ashley | Dave Connolly | Andrew Hines |
| July 6–8 | O’Reilly NHRA Thunder Valley Nationals | Bristol, Tenn. | Brandon Bernstein | John Force | Jeg Coughlin | N/A |
| July 13–15 | Mopar Mile-High NHRA Nationals | Denver, Colo. | Rod Fuller | Jack Beckman | Allen Johnson | Matt Smith |
| July 18–20 | NHRA Shucks Auto Supply Nationals | Seattle, Wash. | Tony Schumacher | Jack Beckman | Dave Connolly | N/A |
| July 27–29 | Fram Autolite NHRA Nationals | Sonoma, Calif. | Tony Schumacher | John Force | Greg Anderson | Matt Smith |
| August 9–12 | Lucas Oil NHRA Nationals | Brainerd, Minn. | Brandon Bernstein | John Force | Jeg Coughlin | Andrew Hines |
| August 16–19 | Toyo Tires NHRA Nationals | Reading, Pa. | Doug Herbert | Tony Pedregon | Dave Connolly | Matt Guiderra |
2007 Countdown to the Championship (Countdown to 4)
| August 29 - September 3 | 53rd Mac Tools U.S. Nationals | Indianapolis, Ind. | Tony Schumacher | Mike Ashley | Dave Connolly | Craig Treble |
| September 14–16 | O'Reilly NHRA Mid-South Nationals | Memphis, Tenn. | Melanie Troxel | Gary Scelzi | Dave Connolly | Andrew Hines |
| September 20–23 | O’Reilly NHRA Fall Nationals | Dallas, Texas | Larry Dixon | Tony Pedregon | Dave Connolly | Peggy Llewellyn |
| October 5–7 | Torco Racing Fuels NHRA Nationals | Richmond, Va. | Doug Kalitta | Gary Scelzi | Dave Connolly | N/A |
2007 Countdown to the Championship (Countdown to 1)
| October 25–28 | ACDelco Las Vegas NHRA Nationals | Las Vegas, Nev. | Rod Fuller | Tony Pedregon | Greg Anderson | Andrew Hines |
| November 1–4 | Automobile Club of Southern California NHRA Finals | Pomona, California | Tony Schumacher | Robert Hight | Jeg Coughlin | Matt Smith |

== Points standings ==
Top Fuel
| Position | Driver | Points | Points Back | Chassis |
|---|---|---|---|---|
| 1 | **Tony Schumacher** | 3186 | - | Hadman |
| 2 | Rod Fuller | 3167 | -19 | Hadman |
| 3 | Brandon Bernstein | 3149 | -37 | McKinney |
| 4 | Larry Dixon | 3135 | -51 | McKinney |
| 5 | Bob Vandergriff | 2358 | -828 | McKinney |
| 6 | Doug Herbert | 2292 | -894 | McKinney |
| 7 | J.R. Todd | 2273 | -913 | Hadman |
| 8 | Whit Bazemore | 2182 | -1004 | Hadman |
| 9 | Melanie Troxel | 1173 | -2013 | Hadman |
| 10 | Doug Kalitta | 1045 | -2141 | Hadman |

Funny Car
| Position | Driver | Points | Points Back | Make |
|---|---|---|---|---|
| 1 | **Tony Pedregon** | 3178 | - | Chevy |
| 2 | Robert Hight | 3159 | -19 | Ford |
| 3 | Gary Scelzi | 3092 | -86 | Dodge |
| 4 | Ron Capps | 3067 | -111 | Dodge |
| 5 | Jack Beckman | 2358 | -820 | Dodge |
| 6 | Mike Ashley | 2337 | -841 | Dodge |
| 7 | John Force | 2191 | -987 | Ford |
| 8 | Jim Head | 2163 | -1015 | Toyota |
| 9 | Del Worsham | 1050 | -2128 | Chevy |
| 10 | Ashley Force Hood | 960 | -2218 | Ford |

Pro Stock
| Position | Driver | Points | Points Back | Make/Model |
|---|---|---|---|---|
| 1 | **Jeg Coughlin Jr.** | 3217 | - | Chevy |
| 2 | Greg Anderson | 3173 | -44 | Pontiac |
| 3 | Dave Connolly | 3126 | -91 | Chevy |
| 4 | Allen Johnson | 3086 | -131 | Dodge |
| 5 | Jason Line | 2292 | -925 | Pontiac |
| 6 | Kurt Johnson | 2278 | -939 | Chevy |
| 7 | Larry Morgan | 2233 | -984 | Dodge |
| 8 | Warren Johnson | 2180 | -1037 | Pontiac |
| 9 | Richie Stevens | 1056 | -2161 | Dodge |
| 10 | V Gaines | 1025 | -2192 | Dodge |

Pro Stock Motorcycle
| Position | Driver | Points | Points Back | Make |
|---|---|---|---|---|
| 1 | **Matt Smith** | 3211 | - | Buell |
| 2 | Andrew Hines | 3205 | -6 | Harley-Davidson |
| 3 | Chip Ellis | 3204 | -7 | Buell |
| 4 | Peggy Llewellyn | 3108 | -103 | Buell |
| 5 | Angelle Sampey | 2309 | -902 | Suzuki |
| 6 | Craig Treble | 2283 | -928 | Suzuki |
| 7 | Ed Krawiec | 2244 | -967 | Harley-Davidson |
| 8 | Karen Stoffer | 2242 | -969 | Suzuki |
| 9 | Steve Johnson | 746 | -2465 | Suzuki |
| 10 | Antron Brown | 708 | -2503 | Suzuki |

- Drivers in **bold** have clinched the championship
