= 2006 NHRA Powerade Drag Racing Series season =

2006 NHRA Drag Racing Season
- League: NHRA
- Sport: Drag racing
- Champions: Tony Schumacher (TF); John Force (FC); Jason Line (PS); Andrew Hines (PSM)

NHRA seasons
- ← 2005 2007 →

Following are the results of the 2006 NHRA Powerade Drag Racing Series season. The 2006 season would be the last time a national event would be held at National Trail Raceway near Columbus, Ohio. The event was replaced with the Summit Racing Equipment Nationals at Summit Motorsports Park in Norwalk the next year. It is also the final year before the Countdown to the Championship format change.

== Schedule ==
2006 NHRA Powerade Schedule
Date	Race	Site	Winners			
Date	Race	Site	Top Fuel	Funny Car	Pro Stock	Pro Stock Motorcycle
February 9–12	CARQUEST Auto Parts NHRA Winternationals	Pomona, California	Melanie Troxel	Robert Hight	Greg Anderson	N/A
February 24–26	Checker Shucks Kragen Nationals	Phoenix, Ariz.	Rod Fuller	Tommy Johnson Jr.	Warren Johnson	N/A
March 16–19	ACDelco NHRA Gatornationals	Gainesville, Fla	David Grubnic	Ron Capps	Tom Martino	Angelle Sampey
March 31-April 2	O'Reilly NHRA Spring Nationals	Houston, Texas	Brandon Bernstein	Ron Capps	Mike Edwards	Angelle Sampey
April 6–9	SummitRacing.com NHRA Nationals	Las Vegas, Nev.	Melanie Troxel	Cruz Pedregon	Kurt Johnson	N/A
April 28–30	O’Reilly NHRA Thunder Valley Nationals	Bristol, Tenn.	Doug Kalitta	Ron Capps	Jason Line	N/A
May 4–7	Summit Racing Equipment NHRA Southern Nationals	Atlanta, Ga.	Doug Kalitta	Tony Pedregon	Dave Connolly	Antron Brown
May 18–21	Pontiac Performance NHRA Nationals	Columbus, Ohio	Brandon Bernstein	Tony Pedregon	Jim Yates	Angelle Sampey
May 28–30	O'Reilly NHRA Summer Nationals	Topeka, Kan.	Doug Kalitta	Ron Capps	Dave Connolly	N/A
June 8–11	Carquest Auto Parts NHRA Nationals	Chicago, Ill.	Doug Kalitta	John Force	Kurt Johnson	Ryan Schnitz
June 15–18	K&N Filters SuperNationals	Old Bridge Township Raceway Park	Rod Fuller	Ron Capps	Jason Line	Matt Smith
June 23–25	O'Reilly NHRA Midwest Nationals	Madison, Ill.	Tony Schumacher	Tony Pedregon	Mike Edwards	Chip Ellis
July 14–16	Mopar Mile-High NHRA Nationals	Denver, Colo.	J.R. Todd	Gary Scelzi	Dave Connolly	Andrew Hines
July 21–23	Shuck's Auto Supply NHRA Nationals	Seattle, Wash.	Tony Schumacher	Whit Bazemore	Allen Johnson	N/A
July 28–30	Fram Autolite NHRA Nationals	Sonoma, Calif.	J.R. Todd	Eric Medlen	Jason Line	Chip Ellis
August 10–13	Lucas Oil NHRA Nationals	Brainerd, Minn.	Brandon Bernstein	Tommy Johnson Jr.	Dave Connolly	Antron Brown
August 18–20	O'Reilly Mid-South Nationals	Memphis, Tenn.	Doug Kalitta	John Force	Kurt Johnson	Andrew Hines
August 30-September 4	52nd Mac Tools U.S. Nationals	Indianapolis, Ind.	Tony Schumacher	Robert Hight	Greg Anderson	Matt Smith
September 21–24	O’Reilly NHRA Fall Nationals	Dallas, Texas	Brandon Bernstein	Robert Hight	Richie Stevens	N/A
September 28–October 1	Toyo Tires NHRA Nationals	Reading, Pa.	J.R. Todd	Phil Burkart	Greg Anderson	Karen Stoffer
October 13–15	Torco Racing Fuels NHRA Nationals	Richmond, Va.	Cory McClenathan	Eric Medlen	Jason Line	N/A
October 26–29	ACDelco Las Vegas NHRA Nationals	Las Vegas, Nev.	Tony Schumacher	Jack Beckman	Richie Stevens	Andrew Hines
November 1–4	Automobile Club of Southern California NHRA Finals	Pomona, California	Tony Schumacher	John Force	Greg Anderson	Craig Treble

== Points standings ==
Top Fuel
Position	Driver	Points	Points Back	Chassis
1	**Tony Schumacher**	1681	-	Hadman
2	Doug Kalitta	1667	-14	Attac
3	Brandon Bernstein	1565	-116	McKinney
4	Melanie Troxel	1471	-210	Hadman
5	Rod Fuller	1384	-297	Hadman
6	David Grubnic	1285	-396	Attac
7	Larry Dixon	1151	-530	McKinney
8	J.R. Todd	1105	-576	Hadman
9	Cory McClenathan	1036	-645	Hadman
10	Hillary Will	1035	-646	Attac

Funny Car
Position	Driver	Points	Points Back	Make
1	**John Force**	1636	-	Ford
2	Robert Hight	1524	-112	Ford
3	Ron Capps	1503	-133	Dodge
4	Eric Medlen	1407	-229	Ford
5	Tony Pedregon	1370	-266	Chevy
6	Tommy Johnson Jr.	1322	-314	Chevy
7	Gary Scelzi	1204	-432	Dodge
8	Phil Burkart	1034	-602	Chevy
9	Whit Bazemore	956	-680	Hadman
10	Cruz Pedregon	956	-680	Chevy

Pro Stock
Position	Driver	Points	Points Back	Make/Model
1	**Jason Line**	1787	-	Pontiac
2	Greg Anderson	1664	-123	Pontiac
3	Dave Connolly	1451	-336	Chevy
4	Mike Edwards	1265	-522	Pontiac
5	Kurt Johnson	1230	-557	Chevy
6	Allen Johnson	1218	-569	Dodge
7	Jim Yates	1115	-672	Pontiac
8	Greg Stanfield	1075	-712	Pontiac
9	Richie Stevens	1047	-740	Dodge
10	V Gaines	1029	-758	Dodge

Pro Stock Motorcycle
Position	Driver	Points	Points Back	Make
1	**Andrew Hines**	1099	-	Harley-Davidson
2	Antron Brown	1076	-23	Suzuki
3	Angelle Sampey	999	-100	Suzuki
4	Chip Ellis	892	-207	Buell
5	Matt Smith	857	-242	Buell
6	Karen Stoffer	814	-285	Suzuki
7	Ryan Schnitz	771	-328	Kawasaki
8	Tom Bradford	721	-378	Buell
9	Geno Scali	705	-394	Suzuki
10	Craig Treble	675	-424	Suzuki

- Drivers in **bold** have clinched the championship
