= 1993 NHRA Winston Drag Racing Series season =

1993 NHRA Drag Racing Season
- League: NHRA
- Sport: Drag racing
- Champions: Eddie Hill (Top Fuel); John Force (Funny Car); Warren Johnson (Pro Stock); Dave Schultz (Pro Stock Bike)

NHRA seasons
- ← 1992 1994 →

The 1993 season of the NHRA Winston Drag Racing Series (now NHRA Mission Foods Drag Racing Series) which consisted of 19 races that were run between February and October in different parts of the United States.

== Schedule ==
1993 NHRA Winston Drag Racing Schedule
Date	Race	Site	Winners			
Date	Race	Site	Top Fuel	Funny Car	Pro Stock	Pro Stock Motorcycle
February 4–7 (original weekend) / 12-13 (rescheduled weekend)	Chief Auto Parts Winternationals	Pomona, California	Joe Amato	John Force	Warren Johnson	N/A
February 23–26	Motorcraft Ford Nationals	Phoenix, Ariz.	Eddie Hill	Cruz Pedregon	Mark Pawuk	N/A
March 4–7	Slick 50 Nationals	Houston, Texas	Ed McCulloch	John Force	Bob Glidden	Ron Ayers
March 18–21	Motorcraft Ford Gatornationals	Gainesville, Fla	Eddie Hill	John Force	Warren Johnson	John Smith
April 1–4	Winston Invitational	Rockingham, NC	Scott Kalitta	Al Hofmann	Warren Johnson	N/A
April 22–25	Fram Southern Nationals	Atlanta, Ga.	Eddie Hill	John Force	Warren Johnson	Dave Schultz
May 13–16	Goody's Mid-South Nationals Presented By TNN	Memphis, Tenn.	Joe Amato	John Force	Scott Geoffrion	N/A
May 20–23	Mopar Parts Nationals	Englishtown, N.J.	Kenny Bernstein	John Force	Warren Johnson	John Myers
June 10–13	Oldsmobile Springnationals	Columbus, Ohio	Doug Herbert	Gordie Bonin	Warren Johnson	John Myers
June 24–27	Western Auto Nationals	Topeka, Kan.	Eddie Hill	John Force	Warren Johnson	N/A
July 22–25	Mopar Parts Mile-High NHRA Nationals	Denver, Colo.	Mike Dunn	Cruz Pedregon	Bob Glidden	Dave Schultz
July 29-August 1	Autolite Nationals	Sonoma, Calif.	Eddie Hill	Tom Hoover	Rickie Smith	N/A
August 5–8	Jolly Rancher Northwest Nationals	Seattle, Wash.	Tommy Johnson Jr.	John Force	Kurt Johnson	N/A
August 19–22	Champion Auto Stores Nationals	Brainerd, Minn.	Eddie Hill	Chuck Etchells	Warren Johnson	Dave Schultz
September 3–6	U.S. Nationals	Indianapolis, Ind.	Pat Austin	John Force	Warren Johnson	Dave Schultz
September 16–19	Pioneer Keystone Nationals	Reading, Pa.	Shelly Anderson	John Force	Kurt Johnson	Dave Schultz
September 30-October 3	Sears Craftsman Nationals	Topeka, Kan.	Scott Kalitta	Chuck Etchells	Larry Morgan	N/A
October 14–17	Chief Auto Parts Nationals	Dallas, Texas	Mike Dunn	John Force	Kurt Johnson	N/A
October 28–31	Winston Finals	Pomona, California	Rance McDaniel	Jim Epler	Warren Johnson	Dave Schultz
