= 2011 NHRA Full Throttle Drag Racing Series season =

- League: NHRA
- Sport: Drag racing
- Champions: Del Worsham (Top Fuel); Matt Hagan (Fuel Funny Car); Jason Line (Pro Stock); Eddie Krawiec (Pro Stock Motorcycle)

NHRA seasons
- ← 2010 2012 →

The 2011 NHRA Full Throttle Drag Racing Season began on 24 February 2011 and concluded on 13 November. This race season marked the 60th anniversary of NHRA as an official motorsports sanctioning body.

There were 22 Top Fuel, Funny Car, and Pro Stock car events, and 16 Pro Stock Motorcycle events.

== Schedule ==
2011 NHRA Full Throttle Schedule
Date	Race	Site	Winners			
Date	Race	Site	Top Fuel Dragster	Top Fuel Funny Car	Pro Stock	PS Motorcycle
24–27 February	51st Kragen O'Reilly Auto Parts NHRA Winternationals	Pomona, California	Morgan Lucas	Robert Hight (1)	Jason Line (1)	N/A
10–13 March	42nd Annual Tire Kingdom Gatornationals	Gainesville, Fla	Del Worsham (1)	Mike Neff (1)	Jason Line (2)	Eddie Krawiec (1)
1–3 April	12th Annual SummitRacing.com NHRA Nationals	Las Vegas, Nev.	Antron Brown (1)	Robert Hight (2)	Mike Edwards (1)	N/A
14–17 April	2nd Annual VisitMyrtleBeach.com 4 Wide Nationals^{1}	Concord, N.C.	Del Worsham (2)	Jack Beckman (1)	Greg Anderson (1)	N/A
29 April – 1 May	24th annual O'Reilly Auto Parts NHRA Spring Nationals	Houston, Texas	Del Worsham (3)	Jeff Arend	Vincent Nobile (1)	Andrew Hines (1)
13–15 May	Summit Racing Equipment NHRA Southern Nationals	Atlanta, Ga.	Antron Brown (2)	Jack Beckman (2)	Jason Line (3)	LE Tonglet (1)
20–22 May	NHRA Summer Nationals	Topeka, Kansas	Spencer Massey (1)	Robert Hight (3)	Shane Gray (1)	N/A
2–5 June	NHRA SuperNationals	Englishtown, N.J.	Spencer Massey (2)	Mike Neff (2)	Allen Johnson	Matt Smith
17–19 June	Ford NHRA Thunder Valley Nationals	Bristol, Tenn.	Larry Dixon (1)	Robert Hight (4)	Mike Edwards (2)	N/A
23–26 June	Summit Racing Equipment NHRA Nationals	Norwalk, Ohio	Del Worsham (4)	Mike Neff (3)	Vincent Nobile (2)	Eddie Krawiec (2)
7–10 July	O'Reilly Auto Parts Route 66 NHRA Nationals	Chicago, Ill.	Del Worsham (5)	Mike Neff (4)	Greg Anderson (2)	LE Tonglet (2)
22–24 July	Mopar Mile-High NHRA Nationals	Denver, Colo.	Spencer Massey (3)	John Force	Mike Edwards (3)	Karen Stoffer
29–31 July	Fram/Autolite NHRA Nationals	Sonoma, Calif.	Antron Brown (3)	Ron Capps (1)	Greg Anderson (3)	LE Tonglet (3)
5–7 August	O'Reilly Auto Parts NHRA Northwest Nationals	Seattle, Wash.	Del Worsham (6)	Tim Wilkerson	Jason Line (4)	N/A
18–21 August	Lucas Oil NHRA Nationals	Brainerd, Minn.	Antron Brown (4)	Johnny Gray	Greg Anderson (4)	LE Tonglet (4)
31 Aug – 5 Sept	Mac Tools U.S. Nationals	Indianapolis, Ind.	Antron Brown (5)	Mike Neff (5)	Greg Anderson (5)	Hector Arana Jr. (1)
2011 Countdown to One
15–18 September	O'Reilly Auto Parts NHRA Nationals	Concord, N.C.	Antron Brown (6)	Matt Hagan (1)	Kurt Johnson	Eddie Krawiec (3)
22–25 September	AAA Texas NHRA Fall Nationals	Dallas, Texas	Bob Vandergriff	Cruz Pedregon	Jason Line (5)	Michael Phillips
29 Sept – 2 Oct	Auto-Plus NHRA Nationals	Reading, Pa.	Spencer Massey (4)	Robert Hight (5)	Jason Line (6)	Hector Arana Jr. (2)
14–16 October	NHRA Arizona Nationals	Phoenix, Ariz.	Larry Dixon (2)	Jack Beckman (3)	Vincent Nobile (3)	Hector Arana Jr. (3)
27–30 October	Big O Tires NHRA Nationals	Las Vegas, Nev.	Del Worsham (7)	Ron Capps (2)	Mike Edwards (4)	Eddie Krawiec (4)
10–13 November	Automobile Club of Southern California NHRA Finals	Pomona, Calif.	Del Worsham (8)	Matt Hagan (2)	Greg Stanfield	Andrew Hines (2)

- NOTE: All races will be televised on ESPN or ESPN2.

^{1} The rules for the VisitMyrtleBeach.com 4 Wide Nationals differ from other races:

- All cars will qualify on each lane as all four lanes will be used in qualifying.
- Three rounds with cars using all four lanes.
- In Rounds One and Two, the top two drivers (of four) will advance to the next round.
- The pairings are set as follows:
  - Race One: 1, 8, 9, 16
  - Race Two: 4, 5, 12, 13
  - Race Three: 2, 7, 10, 15
  - Race Four: 3, 6, 11, 14
  - Semifinal One: Top two in Race One and Race Two
  - Semifinal Two: Top two in Race Three and Race Four
  - Finals: Top two in Semifinal One and Semifinal Two
- Lane choice determined by times in previous round. In first round, lane choice determined by fastest times.
- Drivers who advance in Rounds One and Two will receive 20 points for each round advancement.
- In Round Three, the winner of the race will be declared the race winner and will collect 40 points. The runner-up will receive 20 points. Third and fourth place drivers will be credited as semifinal losers.

== Notable events ==
Veteran Pro Stock driver Jeg Coughlin Jr. announced he is "stepping away" from the Pro Stock class for the 2011 season, electing to race instead in Sportsman classes. "We took most of 2006 off just to kind of have a break from it all," he said in his press release. "We did a lot of high-dollar bracket races and select Lucas Oil Sportsman Series events here and there with no particular schedule in mind. We kind of just raced when we wanted to and it was a lot of fun. That is the direction I am heading now." Coughlin expects to spend more time with his school-age son Jeg Coughlin III at golf tournaments.

NASCAR Sprint Cup Series driver Kurt Busch (#22 Dodge Charger) obtained an NHRA Pro Stock license and debuted in competition at the Tire Kingdom Gatornationals in March, held during the NASCAR winter off-week.

Ashley Force Hood sat out the 2011 season, as she and husband Dan Hood were expecting their first child. John Force Racing mechanic Mike Neff, who raced from late 2007 after replacing the late Eric Medlen after his fatal crash until 2009, returned to drive the Ford Mustang. Neff won the 2009 Auto Club Finals in his last start before returning to tuning John Force's car.

At the Fram/Autolite NHRA Nationals in Sonoma, CA, John Force qualified at the top of the Funny Car ladder. This gave Force 139 No. 1 qualifications for major events, besting the previous record holder, Pro Stock driver Warren Johnson, who holds 138 No. 1 qualifications as of 31 June 2011.

Two days after the 2011 season ended, six-time champion Kenny Bernstein announced his retirement from drag racing. Just six days later, 2011 Top Fuel champion Del Worsham also retired, although he did win 8 races.
