= National Trail (disambiguation) =

The National Trails are long-distance hiking trails in England and Wales.

National Trail may also refer to:

- The National Trails System in the United States
- The National Trail, a multi-use trail in Australia
- National Trail High School, Ohio, United States
- National Trail Raceway, a dragstrip in Ohio, United States

== See also ==
- Israel National Trail, a hiking trail
