= NHRA Mission Foods Drag Racing Series =

American drag racing competition series

- Category: Mixed automobile and motorcycle drag racing
- Country: United States
- Inaugural season: 1974
- Tire suppliers: Goodyear (Goodyear brand in car classes, Mickey Thompson brand in PSM; Continental (Pro Modified only)
- Official website: http://www.nhra.com

The NHRA Mission Foods Drag Racing Series is a drag racing series that is organized by the National Hot Rod Association (NHRA). It is the top competition series of the NHRA, comprising competition with four different classes, which includes Top Fuel Dragster, Funny Car, Pro Stock, and Pro Stock Motorcycle.

The champion of each category is determined by a point system where points are given according to finishing placement and qualifying effort. The season is divided into two segments. After the first part of the season, then in each pro category drivers & riders get locked in to compete in the last six races with the difference in points greatly minimized.

== History ==
The series has four main professional classes: Top Fuel Dragster, Funny Car, Pro Stock, and Pro Stock Motorcycle. Top Fuel was the first category introduced in 1965, with Funny Cars being added in 1966, Pro Stock in 1970 and Pro Stock Motorcycles in 1987. Both Top Fuel and Funny Cars regularly see top speeds in excess of 300 miles per hour (480 km/h) today, and one thousand foot times anywhere from 3.70 to 4 seconds. Both these cars burn fuel consisting of 90% nitromethane and 10% methanol. The Pro Stock record is 214 miles per hour (344 km/h), with times often in the 6.4-6.7 second range and the Pro Stock Motorcycles usually run at 190+ mph (310 km/h), with times in the low 7- to high 6-second range. Top Fuel (class designation: AA/D top fuel dragster) and Fuel Funny Car (class designation: AA/FC top fuel coupe) have recently been limited to a 1,000-foot (300 m) track, instead of the historic 1/4 mile [1,320 feet (402 m)], as a means to limit top speeds and increase safety (there had been a number of engine explosions at or near 300 mph resulting in driver injuries and death). Currently, driver and spectator safety has been enhanced even while top speeds often approach and exceed 300 mph.

Some of the popular racers to come through the series include "Big Daddy" Don Garlits, Don "The Snake" Prudhomme, and Shirley Muldowney. Those three gained much attention from the 1960s through 1970s with their speed and personalities, a combination rarely achieved today through the political correctness of sponsorship in today's drivers. Nonetheless, there are still colorful characters today, such as 16-time Funny Car world champion John Force. His daughter, 2007 Rookie of the Year Ashley Force Hood has made appearances on Good Morning America and The Tonight Show and was voted AOL's Hottest Female Athlete in 2007.

On July 2, 2008, following the death of Funny Car driver Scott Kalitta, the NHRA announced that race distances for Top Fuel and Funny Car classes would temporarily be reduced to 1,000 ft from the traditional 1/4 mile (1320 ft). The measure was intended to be temporary while safety solutions were explored; however, the races have remained at 1000 feet since Kalitta's death. Although unpopular with the fans, the distance remains at 1,000 feet today at the request of the teams as a cost-saving measure, with no indication by NHRA officials of any intent of returning to the full quarter-mile format any time soon. By late 2012, 1,000 foot racing became globally recognized as the 2012 FIA European title in Top Fuel became 1,000-foot championships, as Santa Pod and Hockenheim (the last two quarter-mile nitro strips) made the switch, and Australian nitro racing switched to the 1,000-foot distance only for selected tracks in the world.

=== The Countdown ===
Since 2007, the NHRA implements a playoff system to determine the champion in each class, billed as the Countdown to The Championship. Each season is divided into two segments of races, with the bulk of the races making up the first segment, and the final events making up the second segment. After the first segment is complete, the drivers in each class at or above the cutoff point in the standings (8th place up to 2007 and 10th place thereafter) become eligible for the championship, while the drivers below the cutoff point are eliminated from championship contention, though they still participate in the remaining race events. The points for the advancing drivers are readjusted so that they are separated by a fixed margin, with first place receiving bonus points. The drivers then compete for the championship over the final races of the season.

The NHRA suspended the format for the 2020 season after originally rewarding all teams that attempted to make two qualifying passes per race during the regular season a bonus of automatic qualification as a reward for making all races when the COVID-19 pandemic resulted in five races being removed from the schedule. The format returned for the following season.

== Title sponsors ==
Mello Yello Drag Racing Series logo (2013–2020)

Camping World Drag Racing Series logo (2020–2023)

Winston cigarettes was the title sponsor of the series from 1975 until 2001, when a condition of the Master Settlement Agreement required Winston to drop either its sponsorship of the NHRA, or the NASCAR Winston Cup Series; Winston chose to retain its NASCAR sponsorship. Winston ended their sponsorship with NASCAR two years later.

The Coca-Cola Company took over title sponsorship in 2002. Until 2008, the series was branded with the company's Powerade sports drink brand. In 2009, the company changed the branding to promote its Full Throttle energy drink brand. In 2013, following Coca-Cola's most recent extension of its sponsorship, the title sponsor was changed to its citrus soda brand Mello Yello. With Mello Yello having introduced a new logo, the NHRA unveiled a new logo for the series in January 2016, as well as a new "My NHRA" marketing campaign that plays upon the logo to feature drivers and other personalities discussing what the NHRA means to them.

On September 20, 2020, Coca-Cola announced that, even though their most recent agreement with the NHRA was in effect until 2023, they would be immediately pulling their sponsorship from the sport. The NHRA responded by filing a lawsuit as it looked for a new title sponsor for its premier series.

On October 4, 2020, the NHRA announced a new sponsorship deal with Camping World. In early 2023, an NHRA representative confirmed that Camping World would not be renewing their agreement with the NHRA after the conclusion of the 2024 season, and that the NHRA was seeking a new title sponsor for the series.

Gruma S.A.B. de C.V., through their Mission Foods brand, was announced as the newest title sponsor for the 2024 season on October 25, 2023. Camping World and the NHRA renegotiated terms of their agreement which allowed Mission Foods to replace them as the title sponsor for the 2024 season, and will keep Camping World on as a "premier partner" of the NHRA through 2026.

== Champions ==
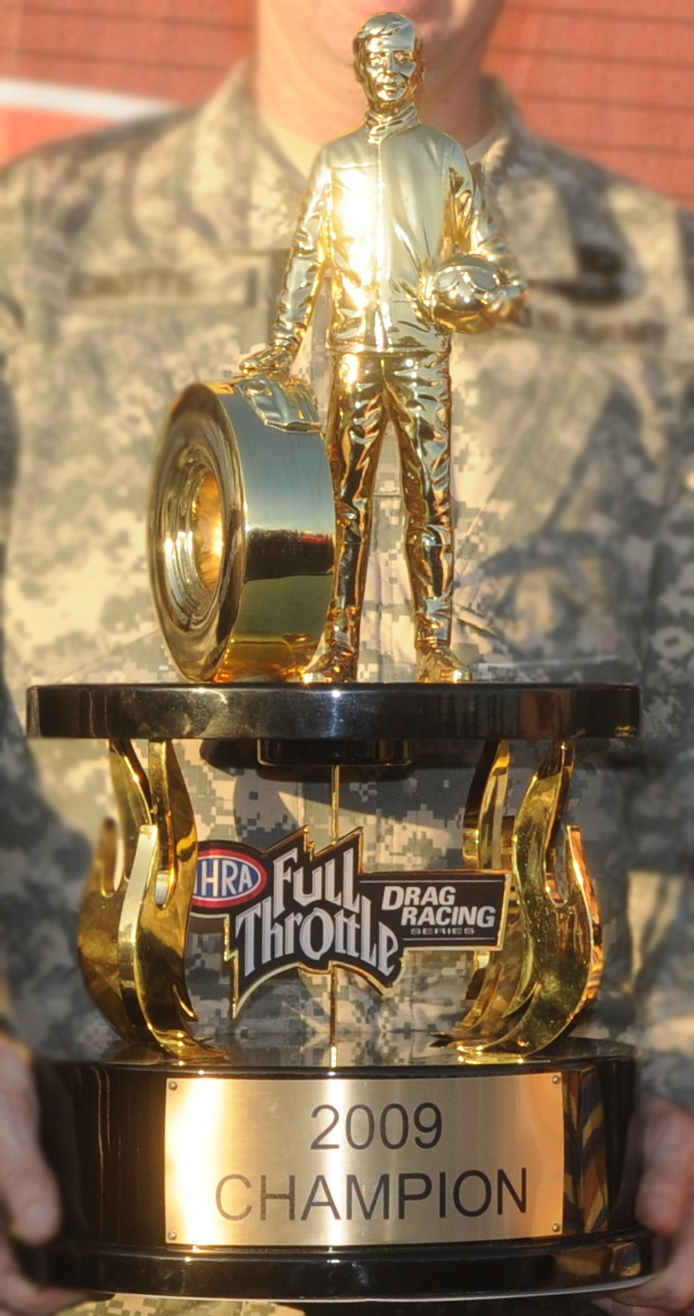
2009 Top Fuel trophy

Before 1974, the season champion was determined by the winner of the World Finals event. The Professional categories contain the divisions of Top Fuel, Funny Car, Pro Stock & Pro Stock Motorcycle.

Year	Top Fuel	Funny Car	Pro Stock	Pro Stock Motorcycle
1965	Maynard Rupp	—N/a	Gary Lawson	Classification introduced in 1987
1966	Pete Robinson	Ed Schartman	—N/a	Classification introduced in 1987
1967	Bennie Osborn	—N/a	—N/a	Classification introduced in 1987
1968	Bennie Osborn	—N/a	—N/a	Classification introduced in 1987
1969	Steve Carbone	—N/a	—N/a	Classification introduced in 1987
1970	Ronnie Martin	Gene Snow	Ronnie Sox	Classification introduced in 1987
1971	Gerry Glenn	Phil Castronovo	Mike Fons	Classification introduced in 1987
1972	Jim Walther (Note: first title after change from front-engine to mid-engine Top Fuel cars, primarily for safety reasons.)	Larry Fullerton	Bill Jenkins	Classification introduced in 1987
1973	Jerry Ruth	Frank Hall	Wayne Gapp	Classification introduced in 1987
1974	Gary Beck	Shirl Greer	Bob Glidden	Classification introduced in 1987
1975	Don Garlits	Don Prudhomme	Bob Glidden	Classification introduced in 1987
1976	Richard Tharp	Don Prudhomme	Larry Lombardo	Classification introduced in 1987
1977	Shirley Muldowney (Note: first championship for a female driver in any category)	Don Prudhomme	Don Nicholson	Classification introduced in 1987
1978	Kelly Brown	Don Prudhomme	Bob Glidden	Classification introduced in 1987
1979	Rob Bruins (Note: won the championship without winning a single event)	Raymond Beadle	Bob Glidden	Classification introduced in 1987
1980	Shirley Muldowney	Raymond Beadle	Bob Glidden	Classification introduced in 1987
1981	Jeb Allen	Raymond Beadle	Lee Shepherd	Classification introduced in 1987
1982	Shirley Muldowney	Frank Hawley	Lee Shepherd	Classification introduced in 1987
1983	Gary Beck	Frank Hawley	Lee Shepherd (Note: also won the IHRA World Pro Stock Championship in the same year. Shepherd is the only driver to do so.)	Classification introduced in 1987
1984	Joe Amato	Mark Oswald	Lee Shepherd	Classification introduced in 1987
1985	Don Garlits	Kenny Bernstein	Bob Glidden	Classification introduced in 1987
1986	Don Garlits	Kenny Bernstein	Bob Glidden	Classification introduced in 1987
1987	Dick LaHaie	Kenny Bernstein	Bob Glidden	Dave Schultz
1988	Joe Amato	Kenny Bernstein	Bob Glidden	Dave Schultz
1989	Gary Ormsby	Bruce Larson	Bob Glidden	John Mafaro
1990	Joe Amato	John Force	Darrell Alderman	John Myers
1991	Joe Amato	John Force	Darrell Alderman	Dave Schultz
1992	Joe Amato	Cruz Pedregon	Warren Johnson	John Myers
1993	Eddie Hill	John Force	Warren Johnson	Dave Schultz
1994	Scott Kalitta	John Force	Darrell Alderman	Dave Schultz
1995 (Note: In 1995, the points system was totally revamped. The winner of each event received 100 points, the runner-up received 90, 3rd place received 80, the other semi-finalist received 70, second round competitors received 50, and all qualifiers would receive 10.)	Scott Kalitta	John Force	Warren Johnson (Note: Johnson had one of the biggest comebacks in NHRA history, moving from the bottom of the top 10, gaining over 500 points, with half the season completed, to capture the Pro Stock title.)	John Myers
1996	Kenny Bernstein (Note: gave driver championships in both nitro classes, one of only three drivers to do so) (Note: Bernstein gave his championship trophy to Alan Johnson, brother, and crew chief of late Top Fuel driver Blaine Johnson, who had died during qualifying at the U.S. nationals that year.)	John Force	Jim Yates	Dave Schultz
1997	Gary Scelzi	John Force	Jim Yates	Matt Hines
1998	Gary Scelzi	John Force	Warren Johnson	Matt Hines
1999	Tony Schumacher	John Force	Warren Johnson	Matt Hines
2000	Gary Scelzi	John Force	Jeg Coughlin Jr.	Angelle Sampey
2001	Kenny Bernstein	John Force (Note: Force's 11th Championship in 2001 made him the winningest driver in NHRA history, beating the 11-year-old record held by Pro Stock driver Bob Glidden (10).)	Warren Johnson	Angelle Sampey
2002	Larry Dixon	John Force	Jeg Coughlin Jr.	Angelle Sampey
2003	Larry Dixon	Tony Pedregon	Greg Anderson	Geno Scali
2004	Tony Schumacher	John Force	Greg Anderson	Andrew Hines
2005	Tony Schumacher	Gary Scelzi	Greg Anderson	Andrew Hines
2006	Tony Schumacher	John Force	Jason Line	Andrew Hines
2007	Tony Schumacher	Tony Pedregon	Jeg Coughlin Jr.	Matt Smith
2008 (Note: Nitro class race distance was shortened to 1,000 feet starting July 2, 2008.)	Tony Schumacher (Note: Schumacher won his record sixth Top Fuel title in 2008, beating the 16-year-old record held by retired Top Fuel driver Joe Amato.)	Cruz Pedregon	Jeg Coughlin Jr.	Eddie Krawiec
2009	Tony Schumacher	Robert Hight (Note: Hight's win made John Force the winningest team owner in NHRA history, with 17 total championships (15 as a driver, one with Hight, and another with Tony Pedregon).)	Mike Edwards (Note: Edwards went 28 years between NHRA titles (he won the 1981 Sportsman class Modified title), the longest in history.)	Hector Arana
2010	Larry Dixon	John Force	Greg Anderson	L.E. Tonglet
2011	Del Worsham	Matt Hagan	Jason Line	Eddie Krawiec
2012	Antron Brown	Jack Beckman	Allen Johnson	Eddie Krawiec
2013	Shawn Langdon	John Force	Jeg Coughlin Jr.	Matt Smith
2014	Tony Schumacher	Matt Hagan	Erica Enders	Andrew Hines
2015	Antron Brown	Del Worsham	Erica Enders	Andrew Hines
2016	Antron Brown	Ron Capps	Jason Line	Jerry Savoie
2017	Brittany Force	Robert Hight	Bo Butner	Eddie Krawiec
2018	Steve Torrence	J.R. Todd	Tanner Gray	Matt Smith
2019	Steve Torrence	Robert Hight	Erica Enders	Andrew Hines
2020	Steve Torrence	Matt Hagan	Erica Enders	Matt Smith
2021	Steve Torrence	Ron Capps	Greg Anderson	Matt Smith
2022	Brittany Force	Ron Capps	Erica Enders	Matt Smith
2023	Doug Kalitta	Matt Hagan	Erica Enders	Gaige Herrera
2024	Antron Brown	Austin Prock	Greg Anderson	Gaige Herrera
2025	Doug Kalitta	Austin Prock	Dallas Glenn	Richard Gadson
2026	Shawn Langdon	J.R. Todd	Dallas Glenn	Gaige Herrera

=== By driver ===
Driver	Championships	Class	Years
John Force	16	Funny Car	1990, 1991, 1993-2002, 2004, 2006, 2010, 2013
Bob Glidden	10	Pro Stock	1974, 1975, 1978-1980, 1985-1989
Tony Schumacher	8	Top Fuel	1999, 2004-2009, 2014
Dave Schultz	6	Pro Stock Motorcycle	1987, 1988, 1991, 1993, 1994, 1996
Andrew Hines	6	Pro Stock Motorcycle	2004-2006, 2014, 2015, 2019
Kenny Bernstein	6	Funny Car; Top Fuel	1985-1988, 1996, 2001
Warren Johnson	6	Pro Stock	1992, 1993, 1995, 1998, 1999, 2001
Erica Enders	6	Pro Stock	2014, 2015, 2019, 2020, 2022, 2023
Matt Smith	6	Pro Stock Motorcycle	2007, 2013, 2018, 2020-2022
Greg Anderson	6	Pro Stock	2003-2005, 2010, 2021, 2024
Joe Amato	5	Top Fuel	1984, 1988, 1990, 1991, 1992
Jeg Coughlin Jr.	5	Pro Stock	2000, 2002, 2007, 2008, 2013
Don Prudhomme	4	Funny Car	1975-1978
Lee Shepherd	4	Pro Stock	1981-1984
Gary Scelzi	4	Top Fuel; Funny Car	1997, 1998, 2000, 2005
Eddie Krawiec	4	Pro Stock Motorcycle	2008, 2011, 2012, 2017
Steve Torrence	4	Top Fuel	2018-2021
Antron Brown	4	Top Fuel	2012, 2015, 2016, 2024
Matt Hagan	4	Funny Car	2011, 2014, 2020, 2023
Shirley Muldowney	3	Top Fuel	1977, 1980, 1982
Raymond Beadle	3	Funny Car	1979-1981
Don Garlits	3	Top Fuel	1975, 1985, 1986
Darrell Alderman	3	Pro Stock	1990, 1991, 1994
John Myers	3	Pro Stock Motorcycle	1990, 1992, 1995
Matt Hines	3	Pro Stock Motorcycle	1997-1999
Angelle Sampey	3	Pro Stock Motorcycle	2000-2002
Larry Dixon	3	Top Fuel	2002, 2003, 2010
Jason Line	3	Pro Stock	2006, 2011, 2016
Robert Hight	3	Funny Car	2009, 2017, 2019
Ron Capps	3	Funny Car	2016, 2021, 2022
Gaige Herrera	3	Pro Stock Motorcycle	2023, 2024, 2026
Gary Beck	2	Top Fuel	1974, 1983
Frank Hawley	2	Funny Car	1982, 1983
Scott Kalitta	2	Top Fuel	1994, 1995
Jim Yates	2	Pro Stock	1996, 1997
Tony Pedregon	2	Funny Car	2003, 2007
Cruz Pedregon	2	Funny Car	1992, 2008
Del Worsham	2	Top Fuel; Funny Car	2011, 2015
Brittany Force	2	Top Fuel	2017, 2022
Doug Kalitta	2	Top Fuel	2023, 2025
Austin Prock	2	Funny Car	2024, 2025
Shawn Langdon	2	Top Fuel	2013, 2026
Dallas Glenn	2	Pro Stock	2025, 2026
J.R. Todd	2	Funny Car	2018, 2026
Shirl Greer	1	Funny Car	1974
Richard Tharp	1	Top Fuel	1976
Larry Lombardo	1	Pro Stock	1976
Don Nicholson	1	Pro Stock	1977
Kelly Brown	1	Top Fuel	1978
Rob Bruins	1	Top Fuel	1979
Jeb Allen	1	Top Fuel	1981
Mark Oswald	1	Funny Car	1984
Dick LaHaie	1	Top Fuel	1987
Gary Ormsby	1	Top Fuel	1989
Bruce Larson	1	Funny Car	1989
John Mafaro	1	Pro Stock Motorcycle	1989
Eddie Hill	1	Top Fuel	1993
Geno Scali	1	Pro Stock Motorcycle	2003
Mike Edwards	1	Pro Stock	2009
Hector Arana	1	Pro Stock Motorcycle	2009
LE Tonglet	1	Pro Stock Motorcycle	2010
Jack Beckman	1	Funny Car	2012
Allen Johnson	1	Pro Stock	2012
Jerry Savoie	1	Pro Stock Motorcycle	2016
Bo Butner	1	Pro Stock	2017
Tanner Gray	1	Pro Stock	2018
Richard Gadson	1	Pro Stock Motorcycle	2025

== NHRA Rookie of the Year ==
Since 1990, the NHRA has annually presented the Rookie of the Year award to a first-year racer in its Professional classes. Many recipients of the award have continued their careers in the sport.

Year	Driver	Class	Wins in Rookie Year
1990	K.C. Spurlock	Funny Car	1
1991	Del Worsham	Funny Car	2
1992	Dannielle Deporter	Top Fuel	0
1993	Kurt Johnson	Pro Stock	3
1994	Bob Vandergriff Jr	Top Fuel	0
1995	Larry Dixon	Top Fuel	4
1996	Mike Edwards; Matt Hines	Pro Stock; Pro Stock Motorcycle	3; 2
1997	Gary Scelzi	Top Fuel	5
1998	Jeg Coughlin	Pro Stock	4
1999	Scotty Cannon	Funny Car	0
2000	Don Lampus	Top Fuel	0
2001	Darrell Russell	Top Fuel	2
2002	Gene Wilson	Pro Stock	0
2003	Brandon Bernstein	Top Fuel	3
2004	Jason Line	Pro Stock	4
2005	Robert Hight	Funny Car	2
2006	J.R. Todd	Top Fuel	3
2007	Ashley Force	Funny Car	0
2008	Mike Neff	Funny Car	0
2009	Spencer Massey	Top Fuel	2
2010	L.E. Tonglet	Pro Stock Motorcycle	5
2011	Hector Arana Jr.	Pro Stock Motorcycle	3
2012	Courtney Force	Funny Car	1
2013	Brittany Force	Top Fuel	0
2014	Richie Crampton	Top Fuel	2
2015	Drew Skillman	Pro Stock	1
2016	Cory Reed	Pro Stock Motorcycle	0
2017	Tanner Gray	Pro Stock	5
2018	Bill Litton	Top Fuel	0
2019	Austin Prock	Top Fuel	1
2020	Justin Ashley	Top Fuel	1
2021	Dallas Glenn	Pro Stock	3
2022	Camrie Caruso	Pro Stock	0
2023	Chase Van Sant	Pro Stock Motorcycle	0
2024	Tony Stewart	Top Fuel	0
2025	Spencer Hyde	Funny Car	0

== NHRA Road to the Future Award ==
Between 1996 and 2001, two separate awards were given to recognize rising stars, the NHRA Rookie of the Year award and the Automobile Club of Southern California Road to the Future Award. The NHRA Rookie of the Year was given to a driver who fit the criteria of not having competed in more than five events before their declared rookie season. The Road to the Future was awarded to someone who had exceeded that limit but still showed superstar potential. After 2001, it became one award — the Road to the Future — limited to true rookies. Beginning in 2020, the award name reverted to NHRA Rookie of the Year.

Year	Driver	Class	Wins That Year
1996	Tony Pedregon	Funny Car	1
1997	Ron Capps	Funny Car	2
1998	Doug Kalitta	Top Fuel	1
1999	Antron Brown	Pro Stock Motorcycle	3
2000	Melanie Troxel	Top Fuel	0
2001	GT Tonglet	Pro Stock Motorcycle	1

== Broadcasting ==
NHRA events have been broadcast on television, with such efforts dating back as far as 1983. By the 1990s, events were split between ESPN, NBC, and The Nashville Network, all produced by Diamond P Sports. TNN also broadcast a weekly highlight program, NHRA Today. Due to logistical and scheduling issues, including the possibility of long turnaround times between heats, weather delays, and other factors, events were typically broadcast in a condensed form via tape delay. From 1992 until 2000, TNN carried live coverage of selected final rounds, typically with a condensed package to air until the finals began.

In 2001, the NHRA entered into an agreement with ESPN for it to become the exclusive broadcaster of NHRA events, shortly after MTV Networks had effectively shut down the CBS motorsport operations after its acquisition of CBS Cable, and the demise of TNN. During its 14-year stint as rightsholder, ESPN faced criticism for the structure and scheduling of its coverage. Due to scheduling conflicts with other sports properties to which it held rights, ESPN typically broadcast its NHRA coverage in inconsistent and otherwise undesirable timeslots. In the final years of the contract, the NHRA attempted to structure selected events so that they could be televised live; by the 2015 season, at least six events were broadcast live using the TNN model from 1992 to 2000.

In July 2015, ESPN and the NHRA agreed to end their contract one year early, with the association citing ESPN's scheduling issues as a concern. In turn, the NHRA announced a new television deal with Fox Sports beginning in the 2016 season. Coverage primarily airs on the FS1 and FS2 cable channels, while 4 events per-season are aired on the Fox broadcast network (including the flagship U.S. Nationals). Fox committed to televising live Sunday coverage from at least 16 of the 23 events per-season, two-hour qualification broadcasts and encores (including the condensed highlights program NHRA in 30), and coverage of selected Sportsman Series events. NHRA president Peter Clifford explained that the deal would be a "game-changer" for the association, citing Fox's history of motorsports coverage (such as NASCAR), as well as its commitment to increased coverage of NHRA events, including live network television coverage.

During the first two years of the contract, Fox had achieved an average viewership of 600,000 viewers—a major increase over ESPN's broadcasts. Some events had attracted an audience of over 1 million. The association's chief content officer Ken Adelson cited favorable scheduling practices (including better time slots and additional encores, as well as using NASCAR broadcasts as a lead-in), and increased promotion of the event broadcasts as part of FS1 and FS2's programming, as having helped build their audience.

The NHRA renewed its contract with Fox in 2021, and while expanding network television coverage, the contract involves more tape-delayed races during the Fox half of the NASCAR season to not conflict with NASCAR Cup Series events, designed to air after the conclusion of such events from February until May), and a split broadcast race that airs at live at 2 PM ET or delayed at 4:30 PM depending on market during the NFL season on a Fox NFL single-game weekend.

On September 30, 2026 the NHRA announced new media deals with Fox Sports, CW Sports, and FloRacing in a multi year deal starting with this season.
