= Virginia Motorsports Park =

Dragstrip in Dinwiddie County, Virginia

- Location: Dinwiddie, Virginia, United States
- Coordinates: 37°09′59.29″N 77°31′26.51″W
- Capacity: 23,000
- Owner: Tommy & Judy Franklin
- Address: 8018 Boydton Plank Road; North Dinwiddie, VA 23803
- Opened: 1994
- Major events: NHRA Mission Foods Drag Racing Series; Virginia NHRA Nationals; PDRA; PDRA Pro Stars; PDRA World Finals
- Website: https://racevmp.com/

Dragstrip
- Surface: Concrete
- Length: 0.250 mi (.402 km)

Virginia Motorsports Park (VMP) is a 1/4 mile (0.402 km) dragstrip in Dinwiddie County, Virginia, just outside of Petersburg. It opened in 1994 and originally hosted the NHRA's Virginia NHRA Nationals. It has a seating capacity of 23,000 spectators. After a brief time with IHRA beginning in 2010, the track returned to NHRA in 2012.

On January 30, 2018, NHRA announced that a pro national event will be returning to Virginia Motorsports Park, as the NHRA Summernationals moved from Englishtown, New Jersey, after Old Bridge Township Raceway Park decided to cancel all drag racing operations there earlier in the month. The first Virginia NHRA Nationals took place in early June 2018. That event lasted two seasons before being removed by the NHRA on March 25, 2020 as part of a purge of races to reduce the schedule to 19 events because of the COVID-19 pandemic. The Virginia NHRA Nationals returned in May 2022. It was not held in 2023, but did return to the NHRA Misson Foods Drag Racing Series schedudle in 2024 and 2025.

Virginia Motorsports Park is also a member track of the Professional Drag Racers Association (PDRA), a regional sanctioning body of professional 1/8 mile (0.201 km) doorslammer (Pro Stock and Pro Modified) style drag racing, with Pro Modified classes split by type of power boosters added (turbocharger/supercharger, nitrous oxide, and an entry-level 632ci limit format), and the Pro Stock class being Mountain Motor. The current owners are Tommy and Judy Franklin, who purchased the facility in 2017. Tommy Franklin is also one of the founders of PDRA. The track has been hosting the PDRA Brian Olson Memorial World Finals since October 2019.

Virginia Motorsports Park has a dirt track located beside the dragstrip which hosts tractor pulling, motocross and other events. The facility also hosts the annual Dinwiddie County Fair in October.

== Current Track Records ==
Category	E.T.	Speed	Driver	Event	Ref
Top Fuel	3.654		Brittany Force	2022 Virginia NHRA Nationals	
Top Fuel		335.82 mph (540.45 km/h)	Brittany Force	2022 Virginia NHRA Nationals	
Funny Car	3.853		Matt Hagan	2022 Virginia NHRA Nationals	
Funny Car		335.82 mph (540.45 km/h)	Matt Hagan	2022 Virginia NHRA Nationals	
Pro Stock Motorcycle	6.703		Gaige Herrera	2024 Virginia NHRA Nationals	
Pro Stock Motorcycle		201.37 mph (324.07 km/h)	Angie Smith	2022 Virginia NHRA Nationals	
