= Melanie Troxel =

American drag racer (born 1972)

- Nationality: American
- Born: August 31, 1972 (age 54)

NHRA Powerade Drag Racing Series
- Years active: 2000-2003, 2005-2010
- Teams: Don Schumacher Racing, Morgan Lucas, Mike Ashley, R2B2
- Wins: 5 (4 TF, 1 FC)

Awards
- 2000 2006: Auto Club Road to the Future Award; Individual Sportswoman of the Year
- Statistics up to date as of 6 November 2017.

Melanie Troxel (born August 31, 1972) is an American drag racer who has raced in National Hot Rod Association Top Fuel, Funny Car and Pro Modified. She is the only woman to have won races in both Top Fuel and Funny Car. She was named Individual Sportswoman of the Year 2006 by the Women's Sports Foundation after becoming the first driver to appear in five consecutive championship finals that year.

== Career ==
Troxel became interested in drag racing while working on cars for her father's race team. She had a breakout year in 2006, when while racing in Top Fuel, she became the first driver to appear in five championship finals consecutively. She won two of those races for Don Schumacher Racing. During those races, she set the sport's record for fastest pass at 332.51 miles per hour (535.12 km/h) and quickest in 4.458 seconds. She was named Individual Sportswoman of the Year 2006 by the Women's Sports Foundation. As a result of losing her sponsorship, she left Don Schumacher Racing and joined Morgan Lucas for the 2007 season where she won twice more.

In 2008, Troxel moved from Top Fuel to Funny Car to join Mike Ashley's team, which was sold to Roger Burgess before the start of the season. She failed to qualify for four of the first six races of the year, but won an event, becoming the second woman to do so after Ashley Force two races previously. Troxel was the first woman to win races in both Top Fuel and Funny Car. For the following season, she raced the Pro Modified class for R2B2, which was an exhibition category at the time. In 2010, she continued to race Pro Mods, but with a limited number of Funny Car races as well, with some events in different locations on the same weekends. During her time on Pro Mods, she set the NHRA run record of 5.772 seconds. She was recruited in 2015 to race an electric drag racer for Don Garlits.

== Personal life ==
Troxel was married to fellow drag racer Tommy Johnson Jr. between 2003 and 2009.
