= Ron Capps (racing driver) =

American NHRA Funny Car racer

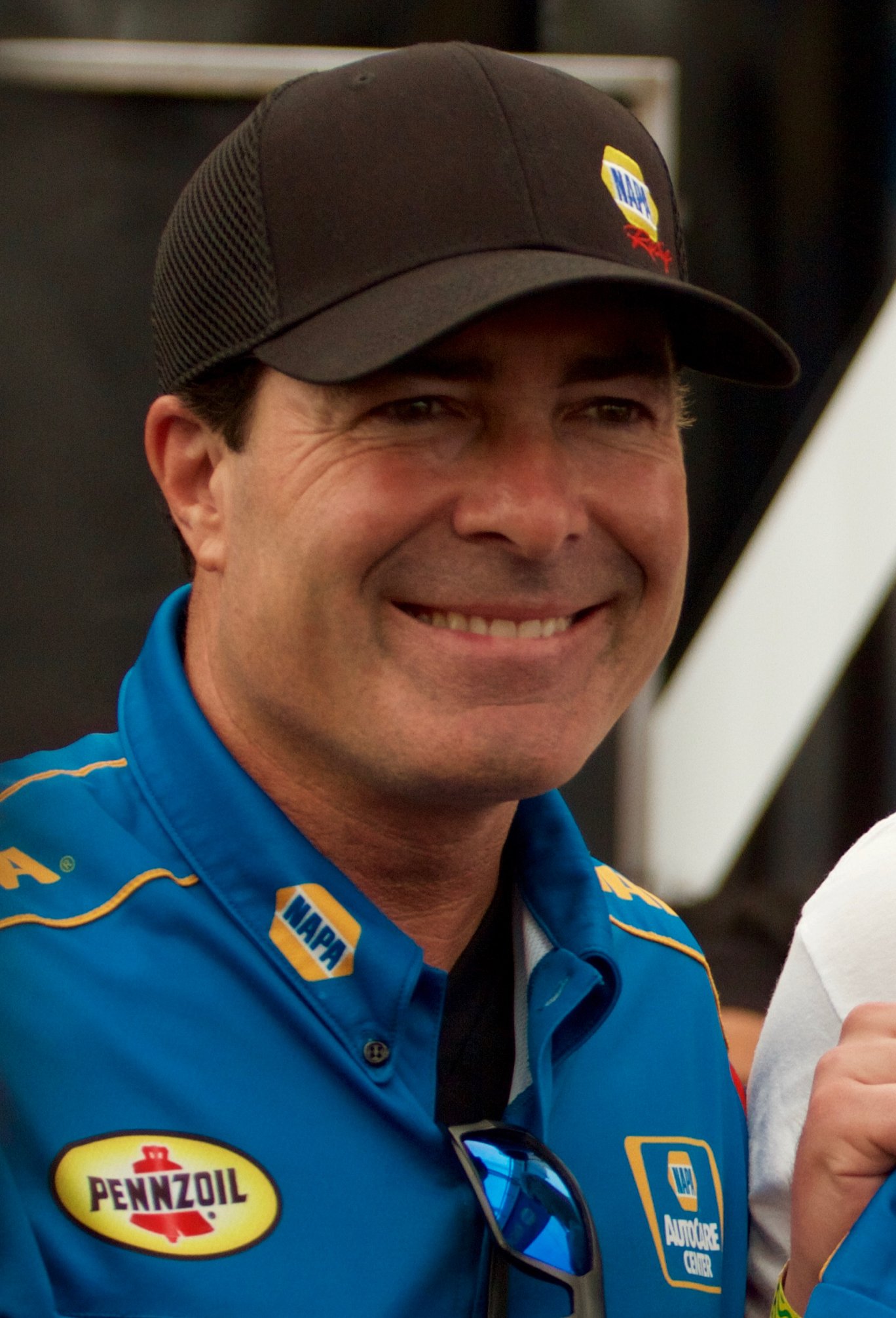
- Capps in 2016
- Nationality: American
- Born: June 20, 1965 (age 61) San Luis Obispo, California, U.S.

NHRA Mission Foods Drag Racing Series career
- Debut season: 1995
- Current team: Ron Capps Motorsports
- Crew chief: Dean Antonelli & Tom Buckingham
- Former teams: Don Schumacher Racing
- Championships: 3 (FC)
- Wins: 80 (79 FC, 1 TF)
- Fastest laps: Best ET; 3.821 seconds; Best Speed; 339.28 mph (546.02 km/h)

Championship titles
- 2016, 2021, 2022: NHRA Funny Car Champion

Awards
- 1997: Auto Club Road to the Future Award
- Statistics up to date as of September 15, 2025.

Ron Capps (born June 20, 1965) is an American NHRA Funny Car racer who owns and drives the NAPA Auto Parts Toyota Supra.

Capps drove for Don Prudhomme, who recruited him from Top Fuel dragsters, and later for Don Schumacher, winning twenty NHRA Funny Car national events and three Skoal Showdowns, coming second in the NHRA title race five times, twice behind John Force, once (while with Schumacher) trailing teammate Gary Scelzi.

Capps has earned 77 of 78 of his NHRA national event wins in the Funny Car class. He also finished second in the championship five times.

Capps' best career elapsed time is 3.821 seconds. His best career speed is 339.28 mph. Capps won his first NHRA Funny Car championship in 2016.

== Motorsports career results ==
=== Superstar Racing Experience ===
(key) * – Most laps led. ^{1} – Heat 1 winner. ^{2} – Heat 2 winner.

Superstar Racing Experience results
Year	No.	1	2	3	4	5	6	SRXC	Pts
2023	28	STA	STA II	MMS	BER	ELD; 10	LOS	21st	0^{1}

== Sources ==
- Burk, Jeff. “50 Years of Funny Cars: Part 3” in Drag Racer, November 2016, pp.52-64.
