= NHRA Summernationals =

The NHRA Summernationals, hosted by the National Hot Rod Association (NHRA), was an annual drag racing event held from 1970 to 1992, 2002 to 2017 and again in 2020, mostly at the Old Bridge Township Raceway Park in New Jersey.

== History ==
The first Summernationals was held near York, Pennsylvania in July 1970, at the York U.S. 30 Dragway. Subsequent events began to be hosted at Old Bridge Township Raceway Park outside Englishtown, New Jersey.

"Dyno" Don Nicholson secured Ford's first pro stock win in his Maverick at the 1971 Summernationals.

"Dandy" Dick Landy made his second, and last, final-round appearance at the 1972 event, where he lost to "Grumpy" Bill Jenkins.

"Jungle Jim" Liberman is notable for performing a wheelstand in his Chevrolet Vega Top Fuel Funny Car (TF/FC) in 1974 and securing his sole NHRA national event win in 1975.

The 1978 Summernationals saw Bob Glidden take the pro stock win in his Fairmont, with Denny Savage winning the TF/FC title and ''The Ace" Ed McCulloch as runner-up.

For the 1993 season, the event in Englishtown was moved from July to May and renamed the Mopar Parts Nationals. The NHRA did not hold an event bearing the Summernationals name until it returned in 2002 at Heartland Motorsports Park in Topeka, Kansas.

Summernationals events were held in Topeka until 2012; the event returned to Englishtown in 2013.

Old Bridge Township Raceway Park ceased all operations in 2018, and as a result the Summernationals event originally scheduled for 2018 was cancelled and replaced by the Virginia NHRA Nationals, hosted at Virginia Motorsports Park outside Petersburg, Virginia.

During the COVID-19 pandemic, the NHRA revived the Summernationals with the Lucas Oil NHRA Summernationals at Indianapolis, which was held Jun 18–19, 2020 at Lucas Oil Raceway in Indianapolis. The final rounds of the event were postposed due to rain and completed at the 2020 U.S. Nationals event.

== Winners ==
Year	Location	Top Fuel Dragster (TF/D)	Top Fuel Funny Car (TF/FC)	Pro Stock	Pro Stock Motorcycle	Source
1970	York	Pete Robinson	Gene Snow	Dick Landy		
1971	Englishtown	Arnie Behling	Leonard Hughes	Don Nicholson		
1972	Englishtown	Jeb Allen	Don Schumacher	Bill Jenkins		
1973	Englishtown	Clayton Harris	Leroy Goldstein	Bill Jenkins		
1974	Englishtown	Dale Funk	Al Segrini	Larry Lombardo		
1975	Englishtown	Jim Bucher	Jim Liberman	Wayne Gapp		
1976	Englishtown	Richard Tharp	Don Prudhomme	Larry Lombardo		
1977	Englishtown	Shirley Muldowney	Don Prudhomme	Larry Lombardo		
1978	Englishtown	Jeb Allen	Denny Savage	Bob Glidden		
1979	Englishtown	Jeb Allen	Raymond Beadle	Frank Iaconio		
1980	Englishtown	Dick LaHaie	Don Prudhomme	Lee Shepherd		
1981	Englishtown	Gary Beck	Don Prudhomme	Lee Shepherd		
1982	Englishtown	Mark Oswald	Don Prudhomme	Warren Johnson		
1983	Englishtown	Joe Amato	Mark Oswald	Frank Iaconio		
1984	Englishtown	Frank Bradley	Raymond Beadle	Bob Glidden		
1985	Englishtown	Don Garlits	Kenny Bernstein	Bruce Allen		
1986	Englishtown	Darrell Gwynn	Kenny Bernstein	Warren Johnson		
1987	Englishtown	Gary Ormsby	Kenny Bernstein	Jerry Eckman	David Schultz	
1988	Englishtown	Joe Amato	Don Prudhomme	Bob Glidden	Russell Nyberg	
1989	Englishtown	Dick LaHaie	Kenny Bernstein	Bruce Allen	John Mafaro	
1990	Englishtown	Gary Ormsby	Chuck Etchells	Darrell Alderman	John Myers	
1991	Englishtown	Tom McEwen	Del Worsham	Darrell Alderman	John Myers	
1992	Englishtown	Joe Amato	Chuck Etchells	Warren Johnson	John Myers	
2002	Topeka	Darrell Russell	Tony Pedregon	Troy Coughlin	N/A	
2003	Topeka	Larry Dixon	Tony Pedregon	Greg Anderson	N/A	
2004	Topeka	Brandon Bernstein	Whit Bazemore	Greg Anderson	N/A	
2005	Topeka	David Grubnic	John Force	Greg Anderson	N/A	
2006	Topeka	Doug Kalitta	Ron Capps	Dave Connolly	N/A	
2007	Topeka	Brandon Bernstein	Mike Ashley	Greg Anderson	N/A	
2008	Topeka	Hillary Will	John Force	Ron Krisher	N/A	
2009	Topeka	Larry Dixon	Ron Capps	Allen Johnson	N/A	
2010	Topeka	Tony Schumacher	Robert Hight	Mike Edwards	N/A	
2011	Topeka	Spencer Massey	Robert Hight	Shane Gray	N/A	
2012	Topeka	David Grubnic	Jack Beckman	Allen Johnson	N/A	
2013	Englishtown	Shawn Langdon	Matt Hagan	Mike Edwards	Michael Ray	
2014	Englishtown	Richie Crampton	Cruz Pedregon	Jeg Coughlin Jr.	Andrew Hines	
2015	Englishtown	Antron Brown	Matt Hagan	Greg Anderson	Jerry Savoie	
2016	Englishtown	Steve Torrence	Ron Capps	Greg Anderson	Angelle Sampey	
2017	Englishtown	Steve Torrence	Jack Beckman	Greg Anderson	Jerry Savoie	
2020 (Note: The final rounds of the event were postposed due to rain and completed at the 2020 U.S. Nationals event.)	Indianapolis	Justin Ashley	Matt Hagan	N/A	N/A	
