= Route 66 Raceway =

Drag race facility in Joliet, Illinois

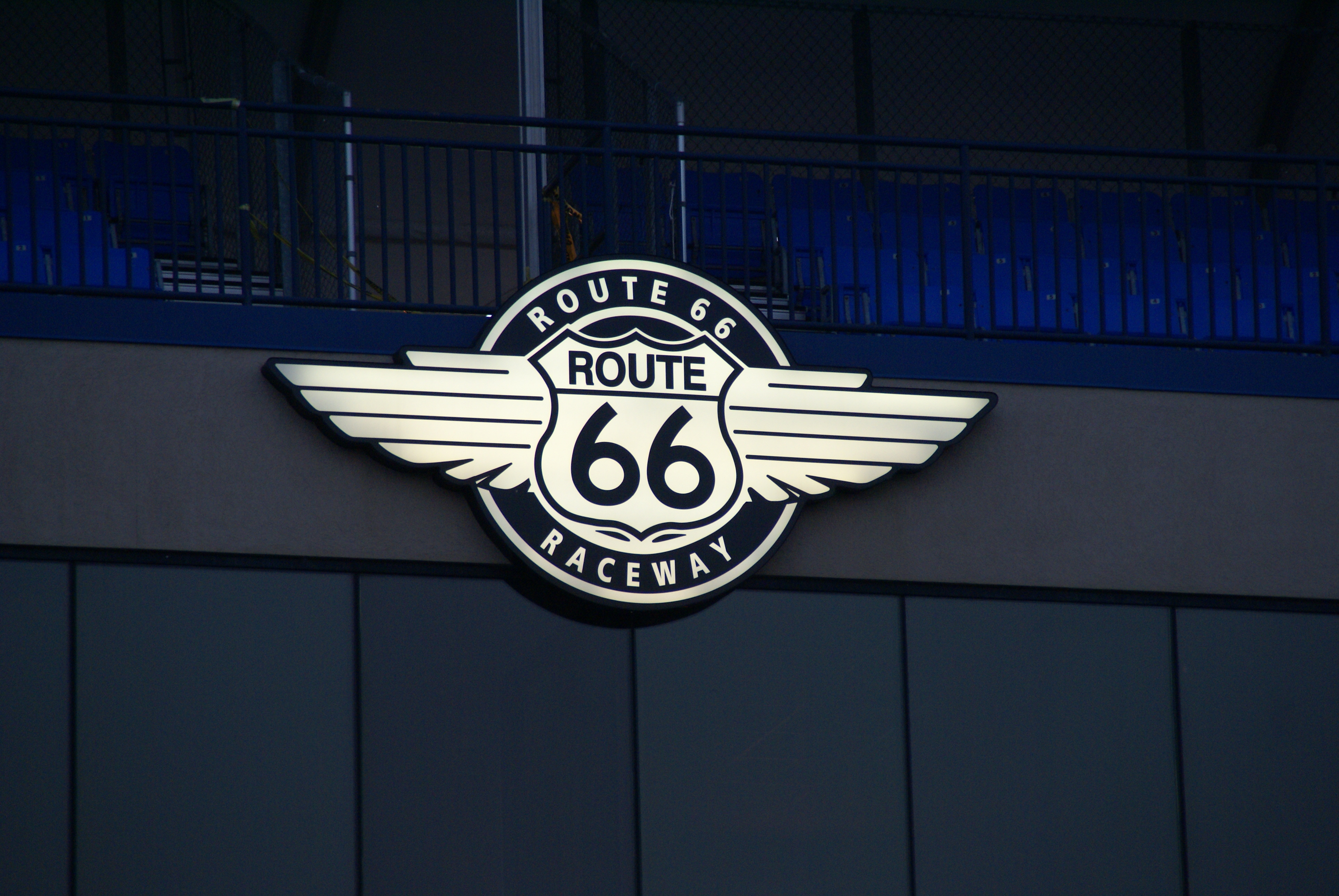
- Location: Joliet, Illinois, United States
- Coordinates: 41.4641°N 88.0751°W
- Capacity: 30,000
- Owner: NASCAR (2019–present); International Speedway Corporation (2007–2019)
- Address: 500 Speedway Boulevard
- Opened: 1998
- Major events: Current: NHRA Mission Foods Drag Racing Series; Route 66 NHRA Nationals (1998–2019, 2023–present); Former: USAC National Sprint Car Championship (2001–2004, 2019); World of Outlaws (1998–2002, 2005, 2017, 2024); AMA Supercross Championship (2000)
- Website: https://www.route66raceway.com/

Drag Strip
- Surface: Asphalt
- Length: 0.250 mi (0.402 km)

Oval
- Surface: Dirt
- Length: 0.375 mi (0.603 km)
- Turns: 4

Route 66 Raceway is a motorsports facility located in Joliet, Illinois, United States. It consists of a 0.25-mile (0.40 km) dragstrip and a 0.375-mile (0.604 km) dirt oval racetrack (Dirt Oval 66). The facility is owned and operated by NASCAR and is located adjacent to Chicagoland Speedway.

== History ==
The 250-acre (100 ha) facility was built in 1998, funded by nine local entrepreneurs headed by IndyCar owner Dale Coyne. The inaugural season saw 90 days of racing activity between the two tracks. In 1999, ISC partnered with the founders of the facility when it purchased 930 acres (380 ha) of land adjacent to the facility to build Chicagoland Speedway.

The quarter-mile, $20 million drag strip features a four-story, 38-suite complex. The 30,000-seat grandstand surrounds the start line and features 40 rows of fully backed seats. In 2010, the dragstrip was repaved.

Also on the facility is a now-defunct two-mile (3.2 km), 15-turn road course, a temporary one-mile (1.6 km) off-road track inside the dirt oval, and a 35-acre (14 ha) paved driving pad.

The dirt oval was shortened to a 3/8 mile facility in 2017, since then the dirt track has seen a resurgence with top-flight series such as the World of Outlaws returning to the facility.

However, in 2022 the dirt oval posted a full card of events, including concerts. Then, for no explained reason they removed the concerts and then canceled race events one-by-one about a week before the event was to take place. On-Line tickets have been sold for these events, and there have been reports of people having trouble getting refunds. As of July 27, 2022, online tickets for supposed upcoming events are now not for sale.

== Events ==
The dragstrip hosted a round of the NHRA Camping World Drag Racing Series from 1998 to 2019, and returned in 2023. The AMA Supercross Championship raced there in 2000 on a Daytona-style course on the dragstrip.

The dirt oval track has hosted the All Star Circuit of Champions in 1998, 2018, 2019 and 2021, the World of Outlaws Sprint Car Series from 1998 to 2002 and later in 2005 and 2017, the World of Outlaws Late Model Series in 2017, the USAC National Sprint Car Championship and USAC National Midget Series from 2001 to 2004, and the latter again in 2019. Route 66 has also hosted American Flat Track and TORC: The Off Road Championship events, as well as monster truck shows and demolition derbies.

== Current Track Records ==
Category	E.T.	Speed	Driver	Event	Ref
Top Fuel	3.661		Doug Kalitta	2025 Gerber Collision & Glass Route 66 NHRA Nationals presented by PEAK	
Top Fuel		338.09 mph (544.10 km/h)	Antron Brown	2025 Gerber Collision & Glass Route 66 NHRA Nationals presented by PEAK	
Funny Car	3.831		Robert Hight	2023 Gerber Collision & Glass NHRA Route 66 Nationals presented by PEAK Performance	
Funny Car		336.40 mph (541.38 km/h)	J.R. Todd	2025 Gerber Collision & Glass Route 66 NHRA Nationals presented by PEAK	
Pro Stock Motorcycle	6.672		Gaige Herrera	2023 Gerber Collision & Glass NHRA Route 66 Nationals presented by PEAK Performance	
Pro Stock Motorcycle		204.26 mph (328.72 km/h)	Matt Smith	2025 Gerber Collision & Glass Route 66 NHRA Nationals presented by PEAK	
