= Old Bridge Township Raceway Park =

Auto racing facility in New Jersey

- Location: Old Bridge Township, New Jersey, United States
- Coordinates: 40°19.985′N 74°20.922′W
- Owner: Richard “Napp” Napoliello
- Address: 230 Pension Road
- Opened: 1965
- Website: https://etownracewaypark.com/

Old Bridge Township Raceway Park, originally known as Madison Township Raceway Park, is an American auto racing facility located in Old Bridge Township, in Middlesex County, New Jersey, United States (with an Englishtown ZIP code).

== History ==
Raceway Park was founded in 1965 by Vincent Napoliello and Louis Napoliello. The site was originally 308 acres on 230 Pension Road, just off of County Route 527 (now Englishtown Road). Since then it has grown to 500+ acres with multiple motorsports activities. The track opened with a single 1/4 mile dragstrip. Raceway Park offered two dragstrips, three motocross tracks, a 1.3-mile (2.1 km) road course track, competition go kart racing track, autocross track, ride and drive site and adjacent Old Bridge Airport.

Their radio and television commercials featured the slogan: "Ah ha ha ha ha ha Raceway Park!" and "Rrrrrrrrraceway Park! ... Be there!". Raceway Park "is one of the most fabled drag strips in America, and it ranked among the country's top five tracks".

Raceway Park hosted its first National Hot Rod Association (NHRA) national event, the NHRA Springnationals in 1968. In 1971, Raceway Park became the permanent home to the NHRA Summernationals, which had been previously hosted at York US30 Dragway in Pennsylvania. The event's date would remain on the NHRA national event schedule in July until 1992.

In 1993, the event was renamed the NHRA Mopar Parts Nationals and moved to May to take advantage of the cooler weather in NJ during that time of the year. In 2000, the event was again renamed Matco Tools Spring Supernationals and was moved to the month of June. After a series of sponsor titling rights, Raceway Park once again recaptured the name Summernationals in 2013. Raceway Park continued to host the NHRA Summernationals event as well as other drag racing events each season until the end of 2017.

In January 2018, NHRA and Raceway Park officials announced that the venue will cease hosting all drag racing events due to rising costs. Areas specific to drag racing will be converted to outdoor concert space. All other areas of the facility will remain operational, such as the drift track, go karts, motocross, etc.

=== As concert venue ===
On September 3, 1977, the Grateful Dead performed for a crowd of 107,019 at Raceway Park, which was the largest ticketed concert featuring a single headliner in the United States until a concert by George Strait on Saturday, June 15, 2024, at Kyle Field at Texas A&M University in College Station, Texas, with 110,905 fans in attendance. The show was recorded and released in album form as Volume 15 of "Dick's Picks", a series of live albums, in 1999. The concert was the largest in the state's history. In 2017, Rolling Stone named the Raceway Park concert as part of the tour listed as one of the greatest of all time. The concert is celebrated and remembered fondly by band members and music enthusiasts alike. "I grew up in Englishtown, New Jersey, and as a child played in the green field where the concert took place. It was a blessing to join some 150,000 colorful people who attended the memorable show that summer day," said Jerry Garcia's wife, Manasha Garcia, president and co-founder of the Jerry Garcia Foundation." The Marshall Tucker Band and the New Riders of the Purple Sage performed as opening acts. In May 2018, the Englishtown Project, a New Jersey touring band was formed to the celebrate the legendary concert. The group was formed by guitarist and singer Michael Falzarano, formerly of the New Riders of the Purple Sage, and Hot Tuna.

== Racing events ==
The two drag strips on the property are officially closed. The park no longer hosts drag racing events of any type.

The 1/8-mile track was the host of junior dragsters and "trophy" classes. The 1/4-mile track was the host of everything from street-driven vehicles to the quickest in the sport, the top fuel dragsters.

=== NHRA Drag Racing Series ===
Year	Date(s)	Event	Category	Winning driver
1986	July 10−14	17th NHRA Budweiser Summernationals	Top Fuel	Darrell Gwynn
1986	July 10−14	17th NHRA Budweiser Summernationals	Funny Car	Kenny Bernstein
1986	July 10−14	17th NHRA Budweiser Summernationals	Pro Stock	Warren Johnson
1990	July 5−8	21st NHRA Budweiser Summernationals	Top Fuel	Gary Ormsby
1990	July 5−8	21st NHRA Budweiser Summernationals	Funny Car	Chuck Etchells
1990	July 5−8	21st NHRA Budweiser Summernationals	Pro Stock	Darrell Alderman
2006	June 15–18	K&N Filters SuperNationals	Top Fuel	Rod Fuller
2007	June 21−24	38th ProCare Rx NHRA SuperNationals	Top Fuel	Larry Dixon
2007	June 21−24	38th ProCare Rx NHRA SuperNationals	Funny Car	Tommy Johnson Jr.
2007	June 21−24	38th ProCare Rx NHRA SuperNationals	Pro Stock	Greg Anderson
2007	June 21−24	38th ProCare Rx NHRA SuperNationals	Pro Stock Motorcycle	Craig Treble
2011	June 2−5	42nd NHRA SuperNationals	Top Fuel	Spencer Massey
2011	June 2−5	42nd NHRA SuperNationals	Funny Car	Mike Neff
2011	June 2−5	42nd NHRA SuperNationals	Pro Stock	Allen Johnson
2011	June 2−5	42nd NHRA SuperNationals	Pro Stock Motorcycle	Matt Smith
2016	June 9−12	47th NHRA Summernationals	Top Fuel	Steve Torrance
2016	June 9−12	47th NHRA Summernationals	Funny Car	Ron Capps
2016	June 9−12	47th NHRA Summernationals	Pro Stock	Greg Anderson
2016	June 9−12	47th NHRA Summernationals	Pro Stock Motorcycle	Angelle Sampey
2017	June 8–11	48th E3 Spark Plugs NHRA Summernationals	Top Fuel	Steve Torrance
2017	June 8–11	48th E3 Spark Plugs NHRA Summernationals	Funny Car	Jack Beckman
2017	June 8–11	48th E3 Spark Plugs NHRA Summernationals	Pro Stock	Greg Anderson
2017	June 8–11	48th E3 Spark Plugs NHRA Summernationals	Pro Stock Motorcycle	Jerry Savoie

=== Motocross ===
The riding surfaces on the practice motocross tracks are mostly soft loam, which is known to be one of the best surfaces for a nice ride, and are slightly angled to allow for drainage. The tracks are also regularly maintained to keep the jump faces, bowls, and whoops from rutting and cupping out. The tracks provide both long, straight paths for speed and challenging obstacles such as off cambers, banks, ledges, and ditches.

=== Drifting ===
Drifting is hosted by a company called ClubLoose; they have been running events there since 2002, which started off in the parking lot, but now take places on a figure-8 track built where the drag strip was once located, using the timing tower. With different classes ranging from introductory, intermediate, and the top level which allows tandeming with other drivers on the track simultaneously. Both the car and the equipment being used by every driver get inspected prior to being allowed to participate. Rear-wheel-drive cars are the only cars that will pass ClubLoose technical inspection.

== Event schedule ==
Raceway Park offers a series of car shows, concerts, mud runs, motocross and swap meet events throughout their season. In the past every Wednesday and select Friday nights they had Time Trials where the track was open for anyone who would like to race their cars, bike, etc. for practice.

== Incidents and accidents ==
- In June 2008, Nitro Funny Car driver Scott Kalitta was killed during NHRA Supernationals qualifying at the dragstrip.
- In June 2010, Alcohol Funny Car driver Neal Parker was killed during NHRA Supernationals qualifying at the dragstrip.

== See also ==
- Atco Dragway
