= National Trail Raceway =

Eighthr-mile dragstrip in Hebron, Ohio

Darana Raceway Hebron
National Trails
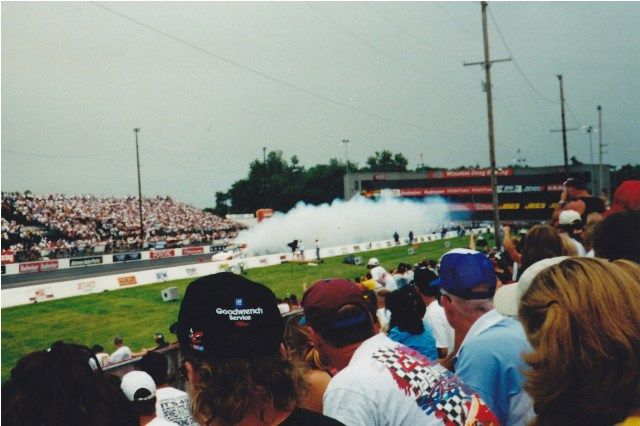
- John Force doing at burnout at the NTR
- Location: Union Township, Licking County, near Hebron, Ohio, USA
- Coordinates: 39°57′29.15″N 82°32′46.82″W
- Owner: International Hot Rod Association
- Address: 2650 National Road SW; Hebron, OH 43025
- Broke ground: 1963
- Opened: 1964
- Major events: Night of Thunder; Mopar Nationals; JEGS SPEEDWeek; Summer Fling; Hillbilly Nationals Demolition Drag Race; Magical Lights of Winter
- Website: https://nationaltrailraceway.com/

Drag Strip
- Surface: Concrete/Asphalt
- Length: .201 km (0.125 mi)
- Race lap record: 4.47 seconds at 336 m.p.h. (1/4 miles) (Tony Schumacher, Hadman, 2006, Top Fuel Dragster)

DARANA Raceway Hebron is an eighth-mile dragstrip located between Hebron and Kirkersville, Ohio, USA, off of U.S. Route 40. The race track is located about 30 minutes east of Columbus, Ohio. It is known to local residents as 'National Trails'.

== History ==
Clark Rader, Sr., along with his sons Ben and Clark, Jr., broke ground on the facility in 1963, and it was completed the construction in 1964. At the time, United States Route 40 was known as the National Road and/or the National Trail, which is why they called it National Trail Raceway. It was the fifth largest racing facility of its kind in the United States at the time.

The NHRA's national event known as the Springnationals bounced around among three different sites from 1965-1971. Wally Parks, founder and head of the NHRA at the time, decided to move the Springnationals to National Trail Raceway in 1972, based on the popularity of drag racing in central Ohio. According to National Trail Raceway's website, "...the race drew more than 40,000 spectators and 600 cars. On both Saturday and Sunday, the (admittance) gates had to be closed while cars were still sitting on Route 40 waiting to get in to the event as the grounds were already full."

In 1976, Shirley Muldowney became the first female to ever win a national event in the Top Fuel Dragster category. In 1982, the first ever all-female professional final took place between Shirley and Lucille Lee.

For most of the Springnationals' history, the event was run in the month of June, often on or around Fathers Day weekend. But, due to Ohio's sometimes unpredictable weather, some feel this is why the performances of the race cars were usually not as quick or as fast as at other NHRA national events. The unpredictable weather often made for unpredictable track conditions. Thus, a number of crew chiefs would often have trouble knowing how to properly tune and prepare the race cars to run well. This led to many upsets during eliminations. In fact, several drivers scored their first, and sometimes only, national event win during the Springnationals at National Trail.

Because the track was built between two roads, United States Route 40 and Refugee Road, National Trail Raceway was known to have one of the shortest (post-finish line) shut down areas of any event on the NHRA national event schedule. In the early 1980s, the NHRA and National Trail Raceway used catch-nets on Springnationals weekends to help stop some race cars that couldn't slow down enough to safely turn off the end of the race track. But, in 1984, Top Fuel Dragster driver Doug Kerhulas had a problem stopping his race car by the end of the shut down area and drove his car into the catch-net, as drivers were instructed to do. Though the catch-nets did stop his race car from going onto Refugee Road, the sudden stop caused by the nets also nearly killed him. So, in 1986, the nets were replaced by sand pits. Ironically, Funny Car racer Gary Phillips couldn't slow down in time and drove his car into the sand pits. But he was carrying so much speed, his car still went through the sand pits, across Refugee Road, and into farmer Herb White's front yard. The race car did not hit any vehicles and was able to miss the farmer's house. However, this was the only time the sand/gravel traps were not able to stop a vehicle, so NTR continued to use them any time the NHRA was in town.

The NHRA and National Trail Raceway eventually worked out a deal with the Ohio State Highway Patrol to close down that area of Refugee Road during Springnationals weekends. This allowed National Trail to connect the end of the shut down area to Refugee Road, giving drivers a little more room, if needed, to stop their race cars safely. And they worked out a deal with Herb White to move the sand pit to the side of his front yard, just in case.

The NHRA purchased the track from the Rader family in 1996. A first offer was refused, but when the NHRA threatened to pull the Springnationals from the track, a deal was reached. National Trail became one of the few tracks in the country to be owned directly by the NHRA. Shortly thereafter, Pontiac began sponsoring the national event held at NTR, and changed the name from the Springnationals to the Pontiac Excitement Nationals and eventually the Pontiac Performance Nationals. The NHRA event was then moved from mid-June to mid-May. In 2005, possibly due to cooler weather conditions and better track conditions, Top Fuel driver Tony Schumacher set a new NHRA national speed record of 336.15 mph. Following the 2006 NHRA season, National Trail Raceway ceased hosting a national event and the Pontiac Performance NHRA Nationals was moved 100 miles north to Summit Motorsports Park in Norwalk, Ohio.

For many years, this event was one of the more prestigious national events on the NHRA calendar. In the 1970s, Diamond P Sports produced NHRA's syndicated television coverage of select events, and "the Springs" was one of those events. In the 1980s, it was annually televised on either TNN or ESPN, and for much of the 1990s it was broadcast nationally on either NBC or ABC.

In 2010, the NHRA still owned the facility. The NHRA Lucas Oil Drag Racing Series and the NMRA hold events at NTR. NTR also holds events such as the Buick Nationals, the Mopar Nationals, and the Night of Thunder, which features jet-cars and wheelstanders.

NTR has also hosted the NHRA National Hot Rod Reunion and Super Chevy Shows' in the past.

On November 5, 2011 the NTR held the annual Ohio High School Athletic Association state cross country running championships. The meet was formerly held at the Scioto Downs racetrack, but moved to NTR due to the introduction of slot machine gaming at Scioto Downs.

In 2017, Shelby Development, LLC purchased National Trail Raceway from the NHRA. The company also owns Heartland Motorsports Park in Kansas, which they acquired in 2015. The following year, Jay Livingston became general manager and co-owner of the track.

In 2019, Big Ambitions, LLC purchased the property from Shelby Development, LLC. Jay Livingston is the owner of Big Ambitions, LLC owns the facility 100%. The International Hot Rod Association became the new owner in April 2025, with Derrick Beach as track manager.Derrick has been racing at this track and announcing since he was 7 yrs. Old. On November 12, 2025, the IHRA announced all venues will be 1/8 mile for the 2026 season. In May 2026 Derrick Beach and key employees resigned unexpectedly. It has been rumored that Beach was running the raceway on his own credit and had done too much too soon to make the raceway look the best it had looked in years.

After Beach's departure the IHRA announced many major events were being cancelled due to financial issues. The raceway started showing signs of neglect and no upkeep, there were issues with paying racers and low car counts. Unfortunately it is believed that 2026 will be the final season at this historic raceway,

National Trail Raceway is also a member track of the Professional Drag Racers Association (PDRA), a regional sanctioning body of professional 1/8 mile (0.201 km) outlaw door-slammer drag racing.
