= Gainesville Raceway =

Drag strip in Gainesville, Florida

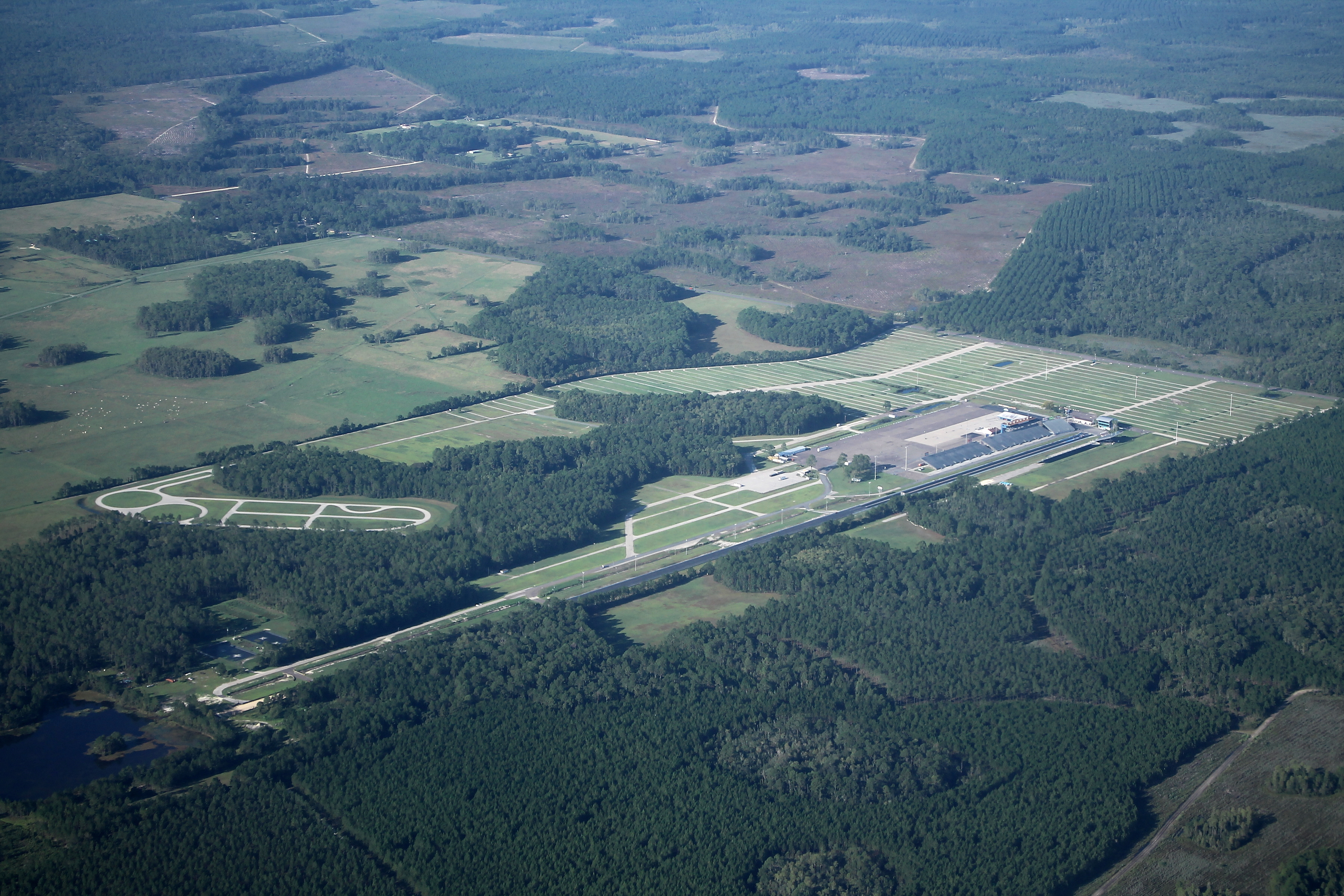
- Aerial view of the Gainesville Raceway
- Location: Gainesville, Florida, United States
- Coordinates: 29°45′29.00″N 82°16′29.00″W
- Capacity: 30,000
- Owner: NHRA
- Operator: NHRA
- Address: 11211 N, N County Road 225
- Opened: 1969
- Major events: Current: NHRA Mission Foods Drag Racing Series; AMALIE Motor Oil NHRA Gatornationals (1970–present)
- Website: http://www.gainesvilleraceway.com/

Drag Strip
- Surface: Concrete
- Length: 0.250 mi (0.402 km)

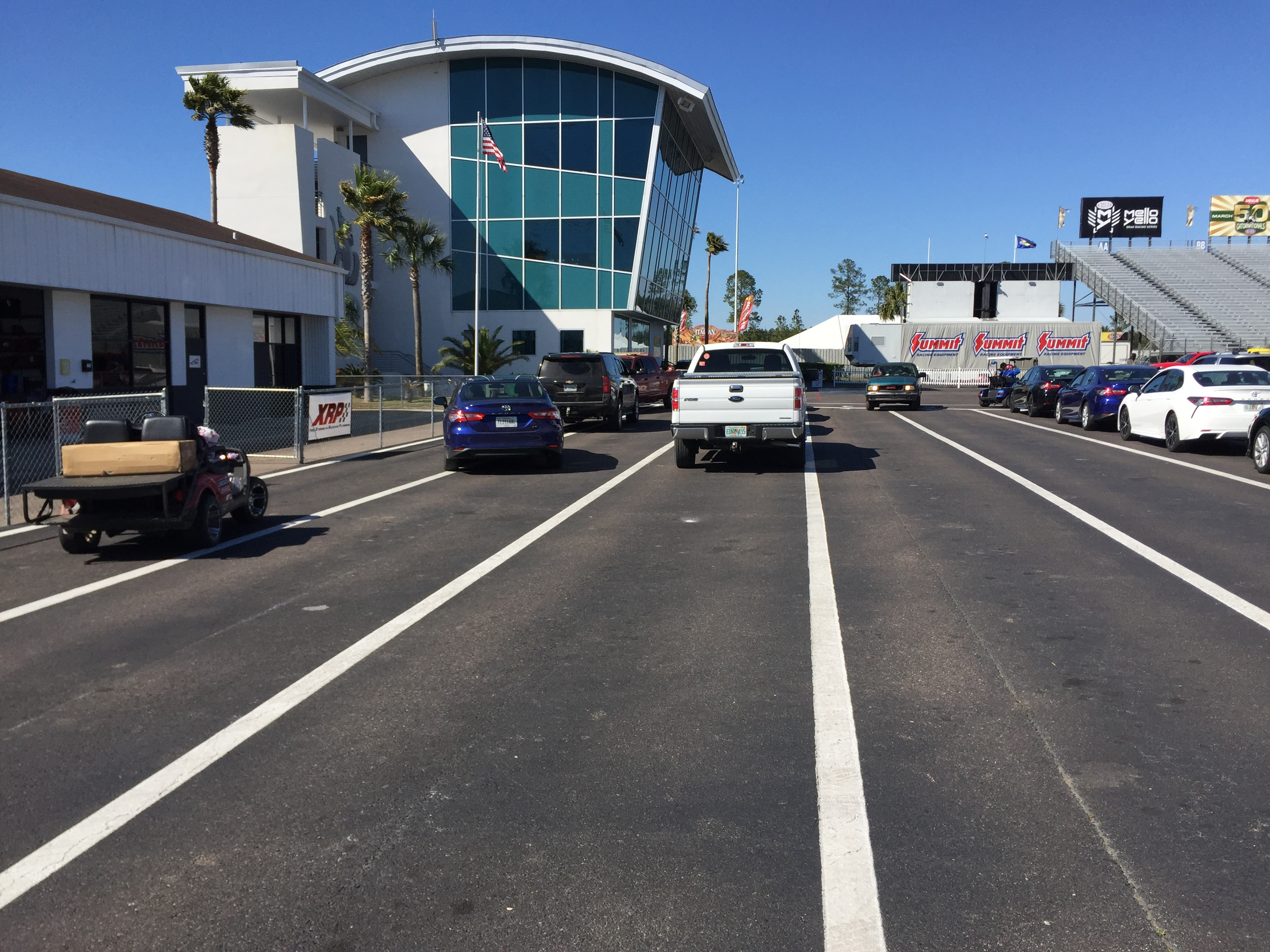
Gainesville Raceway, March 2018

Gainesville Raceway is a quarter-mile dragstrip just outside Gainesville, Florida, United States. It opened in 1969 and is most famous for hosting the NHRA's prestigious Gatornationals event since 1970. Kenny Bernstein became the first drag racer to break the 300 mile-per-hour barrier at the track on March 20, 1992, during qualifying for that year's Gatornationals.

== Overview ==
Gainesville Raceway, which has a capacity of 30,000, opened in 1969 and hosted its first Gatornationals event in 1970. The track became known for producing high speeds in NHRA competition, including the first recorded Top Fuel runs exceeding 260, 270, and 300 mph. During the 2000 Mac Tools NHRA Gatornationals, eight of the ten national records in the professional classes were set at the venue.

Gainesville Raceway has a separate road course, which is purpose-built for vehicle testing and driving schools. Completed in 2000, the road course has 1.6 linear miles of asphalt, with a 1-mile-long outer loop. The road course has multiple inter-connecting loops and turns for training exercises. It has been used extensively for law enforcement training, high-performance driving schools, and amateur and professional testing and tuning. The road course is equipped to handle corporate hospitality functions, autocrosses, and other events.

Following the 2003 season, Gainesville Raceway underwent some significant renovations. The concrete launchpad at the starting line of the ultra-quick drag strip was extended to the 675-foot mark and the remainder of the racing surface, the shutdown area, as well as areas in the professional pits was repaved. A new television compound was constructed for the ESPN crew on the north side of the drag strip, which frees up space in the pit area.

The Pavilion at Gainesville Raceway, completed in 2006, is a 15,000 square foot, open-air, multi-purpose facility equipped with roll-down weblon siding to allow for partial to full enclosure. Traditionally used as the main hospitality area for the Top Eliminator Club during the AMALIE Motor Oil NHRA Gatornationals, it has also played host to the Gainesville Area Chamber of Commerce Annual Gala Dinner, Gainesville Raceway's Annual Racer Banquet, car shows, and many other events.

The skybox suites were constructed and completed in 2007. The suites were designed to replace the aging VIP suites in the old race control tower with contemporary features consistent with high-end accommodations and viewing angles. The skyboxes are set 50 feet above the ground located over the south-side spectator grandstands. These skybox suites offer both inside and outside seating, closed-circuit TV, air conditioning, and other amenities with a view of the racing.

In 2008, the current race control tower was built. The tower replaced the existing building that previously housed race control, press, media, and VIP suite areas. This facility combines National Event race control, a cutting-edge press and media center, and track business offices into one structure designed to project a unique architectural signature.

Gainesville Raceway saw improvements to the gravel trap and top-end area of the track in 2009. The upgrade to the run-off containment area added many new measures for a vehicle out of control. The gravel trap was extended 400 feet, with the depth of gravel being increased as well. New catch nets had a height twice as tall as before with an additional backup set of catch nets being installed. These are followed by DOT impact barrels of graduated resistance and a catch fence afterwards.

The east ticket building was constructed in 2009, and connects the road course to the sportsman pit area. This addition increased customer convenience by reducing the distance to the drag strip from the road course parking area used during the National Event.

2011 saw the upgrade to the restroom facilities, with new environmentally friendly water-saving fixtures and expanded water service.

Up until 2019, the track's surface had consisted of 675 feet of concrete that transitioned to asphalt at the top end. Construction crews replaced all the existing concrete from behind the waterbox to 1,500-feet down the track from the starting line, plus the 100 or so feet behind the starting line. Both lanes were poured and are over 30 feet wide, so everything from the center of the track to the wall. Crews also replaced another 1,800-feet of asphalt in the shutdown area from where the concrete ends to the second turnoff at the top end.

Gainesville Raceway also hosts many other special events on an annual basis including a Lucas Oil Division 2 Race, a NHRDA event, Import Face-Off and Grassroots Challenges. All this in addition to weekly racing during the spring, summer, and fall.

=== Directions ===
The track is on County Road 225, eight miles north of Gainesville Regional Airport. If traveling north on I-75, use Exit 382, Williston Road (CR 331), and turn left (east). Williston Road will become Waldo Road (State Route 24) after it crosses U.S. 441. Continue on Waldo Road to NE 53rd Avenue, turn left, then immediately right onto CR 225 and continue 3.5 miles to the track. From I-75 north or south, use Exit 390, 39th Avenue (SR 222), go east to Waldo Road (SR 24), turn left, go to NE 53rd Avenue, turn left, then immediately right onto CR 225 and continue 3.5 miles to the track.

== Current Track Records ==
Category	E.T.	Speed	Driver	Event	Ref
Top Fuel	3.646		Doug Kalitta	2023 Gatornationals	
Top Fuel		337.75 mph (543.56 km/h)	Brittany Force	2022 Gatornationals	
Funny Car	3.820		Austin Prock	2024 Gatornationals	
Funny Car		338.09 mph (544.10 km/h)	Bob Tasca III	2024 Gatornationals	
Pro Stock	6.443		Greg Anderson	2025 Gatornationals	
Pro Stock		214.69 mph (345.51 km/h)	Erica Enders	2014 Gatornationals	
Pro Stock Motorcycle	6.629		Gaige Herrera	2024 Gatornationals	
Pro Stock Motorcycle		204.54 mph (329.18 km/h)	Gaige Herrera	2024 Gatornationals	
