= Maple Grove Raceway =

Dragstrip near Mohnton, Pennsylvania

The Grove
- Location: Brecknock Township, Berks County, near Mohnton, Pennsylvania, United States
- Coordinates: 40.2127°N 75.9614°W
- Owner: International Hot Rod Association
- Address: 30 Stauffer Park Lane
- Opened: 1962
- Website: https://www.maplegroveraceway.com/

Drag Strip
- Surface: Concrete
- Length: 0.250 mi (0.402 km)
- Race lap record: 0:03.701 (1000 feet) (Antron Brown, Don Schumacher Racing, 2012, Top Fuel)

Maple Grove Raceway is a quarter-mile dragstrip located near Mohnton, Pennsylvania, just outside Reading. It opened in 1962 as a 1/5-mile dragstrip. It was eventually lengthened to its current quarter-mile length in 1964. The track has been sanctioned by the National Hot Rod Association for most of its existence, hosting NHRA drag racing for a national event almost every year from 1985 until the 2025 season. The other key events include the American Drag Racing League, the NHRA Lucas Oil Drag Racing Series, the Geezers Reunion at The Grove, the Super Chevy Show, Mopar Action, Fun Ford Weekend and the NHRA Pennsylvania Dutch Classic.

Local drag racers can compete in the Sunoco Race Fuels Money Trail, a points program that crowns champions in Super, Pro, Street and Top Bike eliminators. Younger racers, ages 8–17, can compete in the Junior Drag Racing League. Both programs have been successful on a national basis; drivers from the Money Trail program have won 13 Summit Racing Series Northeast Division ET Finals, while the Juniors have won four NHRA Eastern Conference championships.

== Maple Grove timeline ==
1923 – Alfred and Edna Stauffer purchase land in Brecknock Township for logging business. As each parcel is cleared, he starts to develop it.

1928 – Maple Grove Park swimming pool opens.

1930s – Brecknock Speedway, on the site of present MGR, opens as oval track. Operated by John Fuzer, the half-mile dirt track features sprint cars.

1940s – Brecknock Speedway closes and land is purchased by Alfred Stauffer.

1957 – Friendship Motorcycle Club receives Stauffer's permission to run eighth-mile drag races. To cut down on number of rocks kicked up by the motorcycles, Stauffer paves starting line with concrete, a racing first. Strip is built inside of old oval track and runs parallel to Bowmansville Road, about 90 degrees from the today's track on the spectator side.

1960 – A group of local racers from the Eastern Custom Car Association – including George Weiler, Carl Ruth, Bob Eveland and Lee Crupi – approaches Stauffer about converting track into full dragstrip that can be used by cars.

1962 – Maple Grove Drag-O-Way opens in August as a nationally recognized racetrack. Carved out of the terrain by John and Roy Stauffer, the track is a fifth-mile long and 30 feet wide.

1963 – Track is widened by 10 feet for safety and a dual-lane timer is installed. Alfred Stauffer and other family members visit Cecil Country Dragway for ideas and it is decided to expand the track again for the '64 season.

1964 – Track is lengthened to 4,000 feet long and 60 feet wide to allow quarter-mile racing. Bob Cassidy hits 180 mph in an AA/Gas Dragster and J.D. Zink runs 225 mph in a jet.

1965 – Lighting is added. Stauffer purchases the diesel power plant used during construction of Baltimore's Harbor Tunnel for the lights. Stauffer dies in December at 80 while surveying another piece of property.

1966 – Bob Eveland leases Maple Grove Dragway and joins the NHRA divisional program.

1967 – Maple Grove leaves NHRA for NASCAR sanction.

1968 – Marvin Schwartz makes Top Fuel pass of 6.91 seconds and Ron Rivero hits 204 mph.

1969 – Maple Grove returns to the NHRA and receives one of five Northeast Division World Championship Series events.

1971 – Maple Grove gets its first Northeast Division points meet; First Pennsylvania Dutch Classic and Money Trail season series. Joe and Mike Lewis are named managers. Pit area size doubled for NHRA WCS meet, which draws 425 cars and 6,500 fans.

1972 – NHRA WCS washed out by Tropical Storm Agnes. Lex Dudas joins MGR staff in place of Joe Lewis. Bob Parmer makes pass of 6.96 in set AA/Fuel Altered national record.

1973 – In a memorable pass, Pat Dakin wins the Top Fuel title in the All-American Pro Series with a holeshot pass of 6.15 seconds that beats Don Garlits, who ran 6.14.

1974 – MGR is named Track of the Year in the NHRA Northeast Division. Local racer Larry Lombardo wins NHRA WCS in Pro Stock.

1975 – MGR wins division Track of the Year award again as Lombardo repeats in the WCS.

1976 – NHRA Northeast Division track operators organize the first ET Finals where drivers from member tracks compete against each other for a team championship. Team Maple Grove took second place in the first Finals at York, Pa. Since then, Team Maple Grove has won 12 championships (the latest in 2010), the most for any track in the nation. At the Pennsylvania Dutch Classic, the legendary Jim "Jungle Jim" Liberman wins the Funny Car title over teammate Roy Harris.

1977 – Top Fuel driver Bob Edwards dies during the semifinals at the Dutch Classic. Raymond Beadle wins the first U.S. Funny Car Nationals.

1978 – Another close call at the Dutch Classic as Gary Burgin defeats Ed McCulloch (6.14 to 6.15) for the Funny Car title. Paul "Dodger" Glenn dies of injuries suffered during semifinal Funny Car accident at the Winston WCS meet.

1979 – Lex Dudas leaves MGR to become director of the NHRA Southeast Division. Mike Lewis is named general manager. Don Garlits wins the final Dutch Classic Top Fuel championship with a record run of 5.96 seconds. Al Segrini wins the U.S. Funny Car Nationals with a pass of 5.97 that ties the mark set by Don "The Snake" Prudhomme. MGR is again Track of the Year in the Northeast Division.

1980 – Maple Grove Dragway, Inc., becomes a separate operating corporation, Mike Lewis is named president.

1981 – Electronic scoreboards are installed and Budweiser sponsors new NHRA Eastern Regional event. Dick LaHaie, Gary Burgin and Frank Iaconio win regional titles before 20,000.

1982 – NHRA Regional is discontinued, so Maple Grove and Budweiser revive the Super Stock Nationals as one of two NHRA Pro Bonus events. Winners of the event include Joe Amato (Top Fuel), Dale Pulde (Funny Car) and Frank Iaconio (Pro Stock). Track pioneer Carl Ruth wins in Top Alcohol Funny Car. Event draws three-day crowd of 25,000. Connie Kalitta runs an ET of 5.61 on new track surface to provisionally break don Garlits' NHRA Top Fuel record of 5.63 set in 1975, but it was not official because he could not back it up. Maple Grove is named NED Track of the Year.

1983 – Winston and MGR agree to build a VIP building and a reserved seat grandstand. Amato and Iaconio repeat as Super Stock Nationals winners, while Frank Hawley wins in Funny Car.

1984 – NHRA awards MGR a national event in 1985. Rain forces postponement of Super Stock Nationals and another storm moves the Top Fuel and Funny Car finals to Englishtown, which are won by Connie Kalitta and Dale Pulde, respectively. Sportsman finals are finished at MGR two weeks later with Bill Walsh setting an NHRA record in Top Alcohol Dragster with a run of 6.33 and Fred Mandoline does the same in Alcohol Funny Car with a 6.32. More than 15,000 attend Super Chevy Sunday. Team Maple Grove wins first of unprecedented 12 ET Finals championships.

1985 – First NHRA Nationals; winners of the inaugural event were Don Garlits (Top Fuel), Tim Grose (Funny Car) and Bruce Allen (Pro Stock). Facility improvements are made, including a second reserved-seat grandstand, expansion of the pit area and 2,000 feet of fence to speed traffic flow.

1989 – Mike Lewis leaves MGR to take a position with NHRA, George Case is promoted to vice president/general manager. The $1 million expansion program is completed with the opening of the VIP Hospitality tower, new grandstands and track lighting system. A Compulink timing and scoring system is installed. First side-by-side four-second Top Fuel pass is accomplished by Joe Amato and Shirely Muldowney at the NHRA Keystone Nationals.

1990 – To raise money for Darrell Gwynn's medical bills after the racer is paralyzed in an accident, a benefit softball game is held between drivers from the NHRA and NASCAR at Reading's FirstEnergy Stadium in cooperation with Dover Downs, where the NASCAR Cup Series Delaware 500 was being held. Over 13,000 crowd the ballpark and $150,000 is raised.

1991 – New return road that brings racers directly into the pits is complete as is a 3,200-foot concrete guardwall down the length of the track. Electronic scale is added.

1992 – MGR celebrates 30th anniversary. Retaining wall behind the starting line is completed. Cory McClenathan is first Top Fuel driver to complete run in 4.7 seconds at NHRA Nationals.

1994 – Mike Dunn and Blaine Johnson make first side-by-side Top Fuel pass in which both drivers eclipse 300 miles per hour at NHRA Nationals.

1995 – Team Maple Grove wins fifth ET Finals championship.

1996 –In the first Pro Stock Bike race at the NHRA Nationals, Angelle Sampey sets a national record with a pass of 7.373 seconds.

1997 – MGR celebrates 35th anniversary.

1999 – Lighting is improved in shutdown area.

2001 – Because of Sept. 11 attacks, NHRA Nationals are moved to October.

2002 – MGR celebrates 40th anniversary. First Geezers Reunion, which features nostalgia race cars, is held.

2003 – Due to hurricane-like weather, NHRA Nationals are moved from September to October.

2004 – New food court area is constructed, including a beer garden.

2007 – MGR celebrates 45th anniversary. The NHRA Nationals isn't completed until Wednesday because of persistent rains. Sticking around to win are Doug Herbert (Top Fuel), Tony Pedregon (Funny Car), Dave Connolly (Pro Stock) and Matt Guidera (Pro Stock Bike).

2008 – Lex Dudas is named vice president/general manager and Mark Dawson joins staff as director of racing operations. Timing system is upgraded to Compulink fiber optics and new LED scoreboards are installed. The Alfred Stauffer Memorial Walk of Fame and Victory Lane are constructed behind the pitside grandstands. Team Maple Grove wins 10th ET Finals championships.

2009 – Track is extended to 4,075 feet making it one of the 10 longest in the nation; 300 feet of pavement was added, along with a 250-foot sandtrap. Part of track that crosses Kachel Road at the end is aligned with the pavement.

2010 – Track opens a month later with a new surface, including an extension of the concrete launch pad to 820 feet. Several track records fall during the Toyo Tires NHRA Nationals, including a national mark of 4.011 in Funny Car by Matt Hagan. Mark Dawson leaves to become Dragway Manager at Auto Club Dragway in California, Anthony Winchester is promoted to track manager.

2011 – Auto-Plus takes over sponsorship of the Nationals. The 27th annual Auto-Plus NHRA Nationals features two National records: Del Worsham, Top Fuel ET 3.735 and Jason Line Pro Stock ET 6.477. Worsham's record pass came in a losing effort to Spencer Massey in the final of eliminations.

2012 – Maple Grove celebrates 50th anniversary with Anniversary Spectacular on June 23 with several dignitaries including grand marshal Don "The Snake" Prudhomme. Race features bracket cars, jet cars and Nostalgia Funny Cars, however Bob Motz's jet truck steals the show. Four National records are set at the 28th annual Auto-Plus NHRA Nationals: Antron Brown, Top Fuel E.T. 3.701; Jack Beckman, Funny Car E.T. 3.986 and miles-per-hour 320.58; Andrew Hines, Pro Stock Motorcycle E.T. 6.728.

2013 – Team Maple Grove wins 13th Summit Racing ET finals championship. The Auto-Plus NHRA Nationals features three days of sunny weather and fans pack the stands each day.

2014 – Anthony Winchester steps down as Track Manager. Jason Leber is promoted to Director of Racing Operations. The NHRA Nationals was once again a huge success even though a rain delay on Saturday morning.

2015 – Maple Grove Raceway's concrete racing surface was extended in 2008 to the 770′ mark of the quarter mile track. In the spring of 2015 ownership elected to remove the remaining 550′ of asphalt and replace it with concrete, making Maple Grove one of the only total concrete quarter mile tracks in the east.

2019 – Maple Grove Raceway is put up for sale for $8 million. Main sponsor NAPA Auto Parts pulls out of the track.

2020 – Motorsports Developers of King of Prussia, Pennsylvania, sign a sales agreement for Maple Grove Raceway. However, the purchase of the race track fell through with Motorsports Developers, due to the timing of the COVID-19 pandemic and the mandatory changes of schedule and operations. The track continues its search for new owners. No NHRA Nationals was held because of Pennsylvania restrictions.

2022 - On April 20, 2022, it was announced that the Kenny Koretsky Family will be the new owners of Maple Grove Raceway.

2025 - On December 12, 2025, it was announced that the IHRA will be the new owners of Maple Grove Raceway. Most luckily the Historical Track name will be renamed to Darana Raceway - Mohnton/Reading PA to keep in line with the other track names owned by IHRA. NHRA will no longer use Maple Grove Raceway to host the Keystone Nationals, and instead announced U.S. 131 Motorsports Park in Martin, Michigan will host the inaugural NHRA Great Lakes Nationals on September 18-20, 2026, marking a major return of national NHRA events to the state and kicking off the NHRA Mission Foods Drag Racing Series Countdown to the Championship playoffs for the 2026 season.
