= Bandimere Speedway =

Dragstrip near Morrison, Colorado, US

Thunder Mountain
- Coordinates: 39.6638°N 105.1877°W
- Capacity: 23,500
- Address: 3051 S Rooney Rd, Morrison, CO 80465
- Opened: 1958
- Closed: 2023
- Major events: Dodge Power Brokers Mile-High NHRA Nationals
- Website: bandimere.com
- Surface: Concrete
- Length: .402 km (0.250 mi)

Bandimere Speedway, also known by the NHRA as Thunder Mountain, was a quarter-mile dragstrip located just outside Morrison, Colorado and Lakewood, Colorado. It opened in 1958 and was the host to many racing events, including many NHRA Nationals events. In April 2023, it was announced that Bandimere Speedway would be closed at the end of the 2023 season, with the intent to move the speedway elsewhere.

== History ==
In the late 1950s, John Bandimere Sr. began to explore property in the Denver metropolitan area with the intent of constructing a drag strip to supplement the family auto-parts and machining business. After being met with stiff resistance from the community in nearby Wheat Ridge, Bandimere Sr. purchased property in 1957 along the Dakota Hogback and began building the motorsports facility. In 1958, the facility was opened to the public, with access to the drag strip, an oval track, and garages to teach automotive repair and performance. Additionally, the facility offered its use as a "high-altitude testing facility", with "lifetime memberships" available to commercial automobile manufacturers for $75.

By 1968, the facility was sanctioned by the National Hot Rod Association, though it would not be until 1977 that an NHRA national event was held at the facility for the first time. In 1978, the first "Mile-High Nationals" event was hosted, elevating the track's status from a small local track to larger recognition in the racing community.

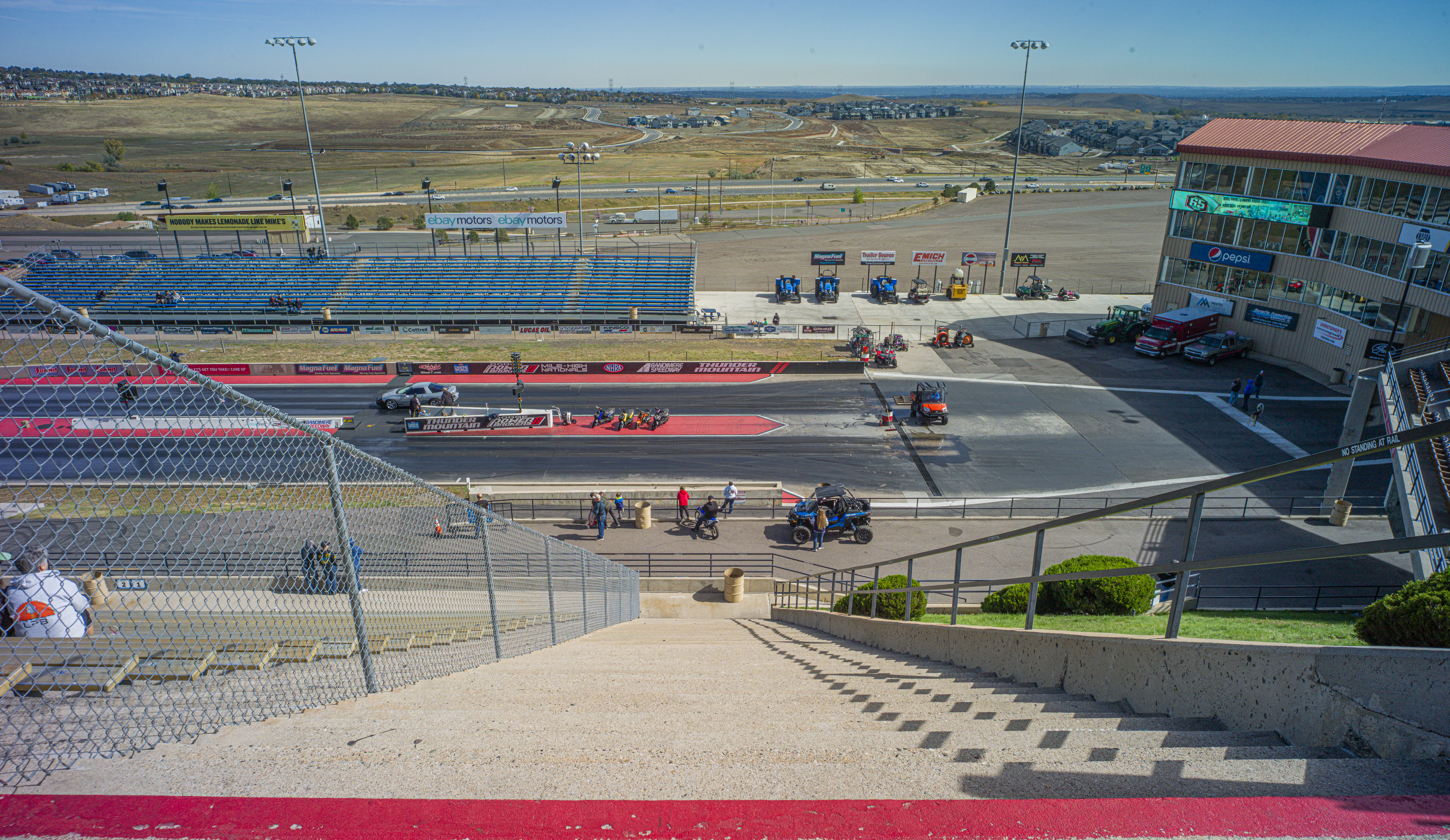
Bandimere Speedway in 2023

In 1988, the speedway underwent $4 million in upgrades (equivalent to $10,889,139 in 2025), requiring a one-year hiatus from hosting events while the work was completed. The facility improvements expanded spectator seating, with grandstand seating capacity growing from around 8,000 to 23,500. Additionally, pit areas were upgraded, parking was added, and signage across the grounds was enhanced.

=== Closure ===
On April 21, 2023, the Bandimere family posted an announcement to YouTube that they would be closing the speedway at the end of the racing season, citing the need to relocate to allow for more space to grow their racing facilities. Reflecting on his time in the area, Bandimere Jr. noted, "this place has never been ours, but always God’s. Keeping that perspective over the years has given our family not only the honor to run a business with integrity and dedication, but also the realization to hold it lightly knowing more than likely that we wouldn’t have it forever." News of the facility's closure was met with a mix of responses, with John Force notably remarking at the venue's final hosting of the Mile-High Nationals, "It’s going to be an emotional weekend, saying goodbye to this place [...] it’s Mount Rushmore [...] this is God’s gift. This is mythical shit. I love racing, and I love this hill – and I want ’em all to know it.”

=== New Bandimere in Weld County ===
On May 23, 2025, John Bandimere, Jr. announced he and his partners had closed on 114 acres of property in Hudson, Colorado in Weld County, Colorado to be the beginning of a plan of zoning, construction, and eventually a new Bandimere Speedway. Officials hope to acquire over 1,000 acres of property for the circuit for a road course that could host club racing, INDYCAR's revived Grand Prix of Denver, a karting circuit, and drag strip.

== Track characteristics ==
Bandimere sits at over 5,000 feet above sea level, and the thin air affects the cars in two ways. First, there's less oxygen per cubic foot of intake air, so engines make significantly less power, whether naturally aspirated or turbo- or super-charged. Second, wings and spoilers and bodywork generates less downforce, which means less traction. Thinner air also reduced aerodynamic drag, but not nearly enough to offset the power loss. The result is modestly slower times: a car capable of 330 mph (530 km/h) elsewhere might barely reach 320 mph (3% slower) at Bandimere, and a car that runs in the high 3-second range at sea level might not break 4 seconds. To account for this, the NHRA raised the indices in its bracket categories by 6/10th of a second. Super Comp runs to 9.50, Super Gas to 10.50 and Super Street to 11.50, and all other bracket-based classes are similarly reindexed.

The track is also the only NHRA-sanctioned track with a downhill staging area, and uphill shut down strip. The latter being a substantial safety measure.
