= Leah Pruett =

American drag racer (born 1988)

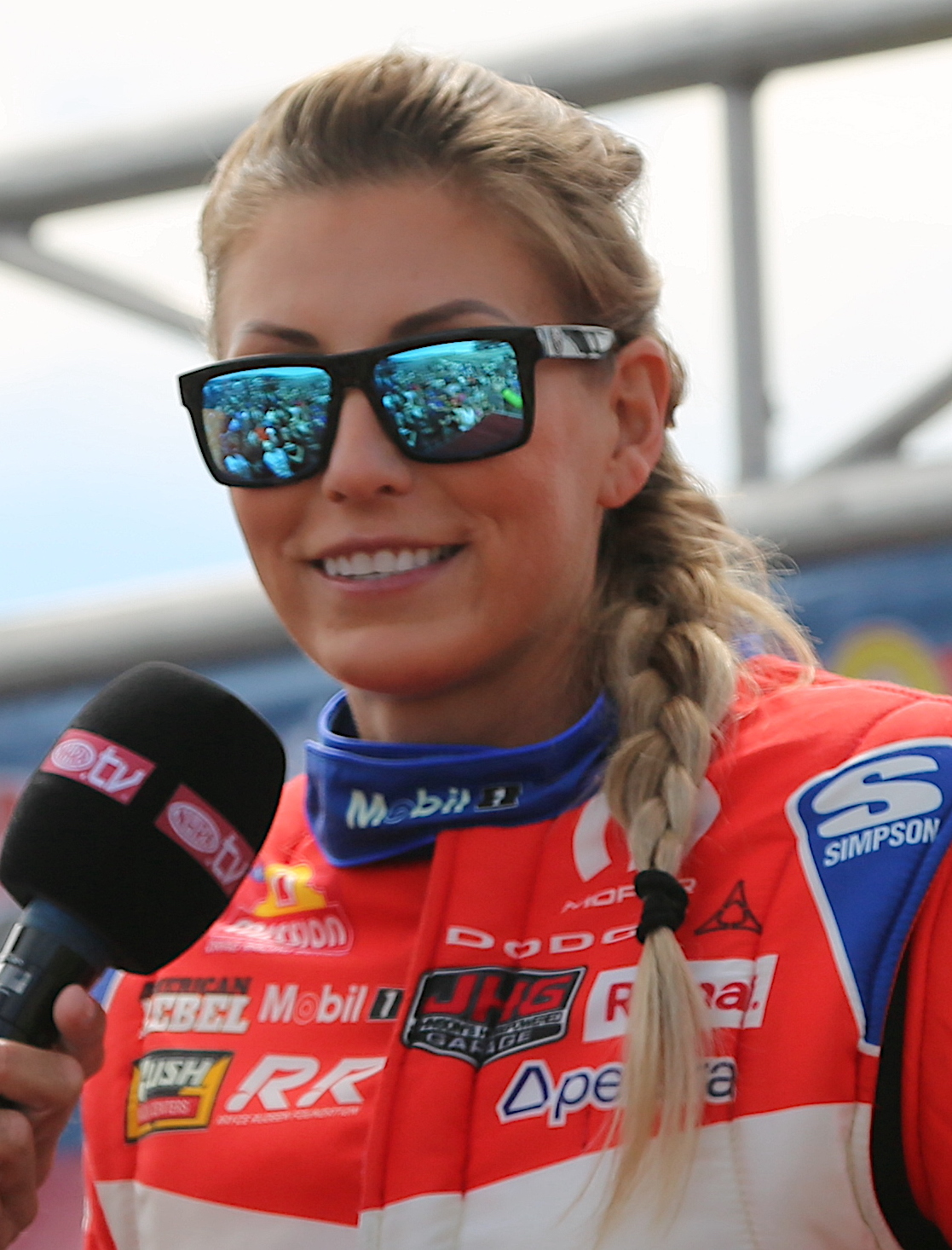
- Pruett at Sonoma Raceway in 2026
- Born: Leah Christine Pruett; May 26, 1988 (age 38); Redlands, California, U.S.
- Spouses: Todd Leduc (divorced); Gary Pritchett (m. 2013; div. 2019); Tony Stewart (m. 2021)
- Children: Dominic (1)

NHRA Mission Foods Series career
- Current team: Tony Stewart Racing
- Years active: 2013–present
- Car number: 3
- Engine: Dodge
- Crew chief: Neal Strausbaugh and Michael Domagala
- Former teams: Don Schumacher Racing; Bob Vandergriff Racing; Dote Racing
- Championships: 1 (Factory Stock Showdown)
- Wins: 18 (12 Top Fuel, 3 Pro Mod, 3 Factory Stock Showdown)
- Fastest laps: Best ET; 3.631 seconds; 11/10/2018 at Pomona, CA; Best Speed; 334.15 mph (537.76 km/h); 2/24/2018 at Chandler, AZ
- Statistics up to date as of May 27, 2024.

Leah Christine Pruett (Note: Although she married Tony Stewart in 2021, she continues to use Pruett professionally.) (formerly LeDuc, and later Pritchett born May 26, 1988) is an American drag racer, who drives a NHRA Top Fuel dragster for Tony Stewart Racing.

== Racing career ==
Pruett debuted in Top Fuel in 2013 with Dote Racing after previously competing in Pro Mod and Nostalgia Funny Car. Her first career national event win on the professional level came February 28, 2016 at the Carquest Auto Parts NHRA Nationals in Chandler, Arizona, defeating Brittany Force in the first all-female final round in Top Fuel since 1982. She finished seventh in points in 2016 with one win, fifth in 2017 with four wins, and fourth in 2018 (two wins), 2019 (one win) and 2020 (no wins). In 2021, she claimed one win. On October 14, 2021, Pruett was announced as the Top Fuel driver for Tony Stewart Racing in 2022.

=== Retirement ===
Pruett would step aside from racing in 2024, replaced by her husband, Tony Stewart, while they planned to start a family. She returned to NHRA in 2026 replacing Stewart in his own team, and securing her first win of the season and first win since Texas 2023, at the 2026 New England Nationals.

== Personal life ==
Pruett was first married to Todd LeDuc, off-road racer and Monster Jam truck driver. She met Gary Pritchett, a crew member for NHRA Top Fuel drag racer Steve Torrence, in 2011; they married in 2013. Pruett filed for divorce from Pritchett on July 31, 2019, in Hendricks County, Indiana. She was arrested on a charge of disorderly conduct in Hendricks County, Indiana, on October 21, 2012; the terms of a pre-trial conversion agreement were met on February 7, 2014. She and former NASCAR driver Tony Stewart announced their engagement through simultaneous Instagram posts on each of their accounts on March 18, 2021. They married on November 21, 2021 in Los Cabos, Mexico.

Pruett and Stewart welcomed a son, Dominic James Stewart, on November 16, 2024.

She is not related to former stock car racing, open-wheel racing and sports car racing driver Scott Pruett.

== Career results ==
=== Highlights ===
- Claimed the NHRA SAMTech Factory Stock Showdown championship in 2019, DSR's first series championship in their first year in the class. Pruett is also the only female champion in the short history of the class.
- Pruett also won the 2010 Nostalgia Funny Car title in the NHRA Hot Rod Heritage Series
- Has earned 14 total event wins (11 in Top Fuel, 3 in Pro Modified)
- Has a career best E.T. of 3.631 seconds, and a best speed of 334.15 miles per hour

=== Season results ===
Top Fuel

- 2013: 15th (no wins)
- 2014: 14th (no wins)
- 2015: 14th (no wins)
- 2016: 7th (1 win at Chandler).
- 2017: 5th (4 wins at the Winternationals, Chandler, Houston and Brainerd).
- 2018: 4th (2 wins at Atlanta and Denver).
- 2019: 4th (1 win at Brainerd).
- 2020: 4th (no wins)
- 2021: 7th (1 win at the Winternationals)
- 2022: 11th (1 win at Denver).
- 2023: 3rd (2 wins at Norwalk and Texas).
