= 2018 NHRA Mello Yello Drag Racing Series =

2018 NHRA Mello Yello Drag Racing Series season
- League: NHRA
- Sport: Drag racing
- Champions: Steve Torrence (TF); J.R. Todd (FC); Tanner Gray (PS); Matt Smith (PSM)

NHRA seasons
- ← 2017 2019 →

The 2018 NHRA Mello Yello Drag Racing Season was announced on June 6, 2017.

It was the 63rd season of the National Hot Rod Association's top drag racing competition. There were 24 Top Fuel, Funny Car, and Pro Stock events, and 16 Pro Stock Motorcycle events.

== Schedule ==
2018 NHRA Mello Yello Drag Racing Series Schedule
Date	Race	Site	TV	Winners			
Date	Race	Site	TV	Top Fuel Dragster	Funny Car	Pro Stock	PS Motorcycle
Feb 8–11	Lucas Oil NHRA Winternationals presented by ProtectTheHarvest.com	Pomona, CA	FS1	Doug Kalitta (1)	Matt Hagan (1)	Bo Butner (1)	N/A
Feb 23–25	NHRA Arizona Nationals	Chandler, AZ	FS1*	Steve Torrence (1)	Courtney Force (1)	Chris McGaha (1)	N/A
Mar 15–18	Amalie Motor Oil NHRA Gatornationals	Gainesville, FL	FS1*	Richie Crampton (1)	Jack Beckman (1)	Tanner Gray (1)	Eddie Krawiec (1)
Apr 6–8	DENSO Auto Parts NHRA Four-Wide Nationals ^{4 Lanes}	Las Vegas, NV	FS1*	Steve Torrence (2)	J.R. Todd (1)	Vincent Nobile (1)	N/A
Apr 20–22	NHRA SpringNationals	Baytown, TX	FS1	Brittany Force (1)	J.R. Todd (2)	Matt Hartford (1)	N/A
Apr 27–29	NGK Spark Plugs NHRA Four-Wide Nationals ^{4 Lanes}	Concord, NC	FS1*	Steve Torrence (3)	Cruz Pedregon (1)	Erica Enders-Stevens (1)	Jerry Savoie (1)
May 4–6	NHRA Southern Nationals	Commerce, GA	FS1*	Leah Pritchett (1)	Courtney Force (2)	Vincent Nobile (2)	Eddie Krawiec (2)
May 18–21 (Note: Due to inclement weather throughout the day, Final Elimination Rounds at the Menards NHRA Heartland Nationals in Topeka, Kansas did not start until around 7 PM CDT on May 20, 2018. After fog began settling in during the second round of pro racing, it was postponed until the following day at 10 AM CDT when the semifinal and final rounds were held.)	Menards NHRA Heartland Nationals presented by Minties	Topeka, KS	FS1	Clay Millican (1)	Courtney Force (3)	Deric Kramer (1)	N/A
May 31 – Jun 3	JEGS Route 66 NHRA Nationals	Joliet, IL	FS1*	Clay Millican (2)	Robert Hight (1)	Jeg Coughlin, Jr. (1)	Matt Smith (1)
Jun 8–10	Virginia NHRA Nationals	Petersburg, VA	FS1*	Steve Torrence (4)	Courtney Force (4)	Tanner Gray (2)	L.E. Tonglet (1)
Jun 15–17	Fitzgerald USA NHRA Thunder Valley Nationals	Bristol, TN	FS1*	Tony Schumacher (1)	Ron Capps (1)	Jeg Coughlin, Jr. (2)	N/A
Jun 21–24	Summit Racing Equipment NHRA Nationals	Norwalk, OH	FS1*	Blake Alexander (1)	Matt Hagan (2)	Tanner Gray (3)	Eddie Krawiec (3)
Jul 6–8	NHRA New England Nationals	Epping, NH	FS1	Steve Torrence (5)	Matt Hagan (3)	Chris McGaha (2)	N/A
Jul 20–22	Dodge Mile-High NHRA Nationals	Morrison, CO	Fox	Leah Pritchett (2)	John Force (1)	Greg Anderson (1)	Hector Arana, Jr. (1)
Jul 27–29	Toyota NHRA Sonoma Nationals	Sonoma, CA	Fox	Blake Alexander (2)	Robert Hight (2)	Jeg Coughlin, Jr. (3)	L.E. Tonglet (2)
Aug 3–5	CatSpot NHRA Northwest Nationals	Kent, WA	Fox	Antron Brown (1)	Ron Capps (2)	Tanner Gray (4)	N/A
Aug 16–19	Lucas Oil NHRA Nationals	Brainerd, MN	FS1	Billy Torrence (1)	Jack Beckman (2)	Deric Kramer (2)	Eddie Krawiec (4)
Aug 29 – Sep 3	Chevrolet Performance U.S. Nationals ^{1.5}	Clermont, IN	Fox	Terry McMillen (1)	J.R. Todd (3)	Tanner Gray (5)	L.E. Tonglet (3)
Countdown to the Championship
Sep 13–16	Dodge NHRA Nationals	Mohnton, PA	FS1*	Steve Torrence (6)	J.R. Todd (4)	Vincent Nobile (3)	Hector Arana, Jr. (2)
Sep 21–23	AAA Insurance NHRA Midwest Nationals	Madison, IL	FS1	Steve Torrence (7)	Robert Hight (3)	Tanner Gray (6)	Matt Smith (2)
Oct 4–7	AAA Texas NHRA FallNationals	Ennis, TX	FS1	Steve Torrence (8)	Robert Hight (4)	Tanner Gray (7)	L.E. Tonglet (4)
Oct 12–14	NHRA Carolina Nationals presented by WIX Filters	Concord, NC	FS1	Steve Torrence (9)	Ron Capps (3)	Jason Line (1)	Matt Smith (3)
Oct 25–28	Toyota NHRA Nationals	Las Vegas, NV	FS1	Steve Torrence (10)	J.R. Todd (5)	Bo Butner (2)	Hector Arana, Jr. (3)
Nov 8–11	Auto Club NHRA Finals ^{1.5}	Pomona, CA	FS1	Steve Torrence (11)	J.R. Todd (6)	Tanner Gray (8)	Matt Smith (4)

* Finals televised on tape delay. Ennis, TX race broadcast schedule and channel changed from FS2 to FS1 because of 2018 National League Division Series presented by Doosan Game 3 start times.

=== Additional Rules for Specially Marked Races ===
4 Lanes: The Four-Wide Nationals in both Las Vegas and Charlotte in the spring will compete with cars on four lanes.

- All cars will qualify on each lane as all four lanes will be used in qualifying.
- Three rounds with cars using all four lanes.
- In Rounds One and Two, the top two drivers (of four) will advance to the next round.
- The pairings are set as follows:
  - Race One: 1, 8, 9, 16
  - Race Two: 4, 5, 12, 13
  - Race Three: 2, 7, 10, 15
  - Race Four: 3, 6, 11, 14
  - Semifinal One: Top two in Race One and Race Two
  - Semifinal Two: Top two in Race Three and Race Four
  - Finals: Top two in Semifinal One and Semifinal Two
- Lane choice determined by times in previous round. In first round, lane choice determined by fastest times.
- Drivers who advance in Rounds One and Two will receive 20 points for each round advancement.
- In Round Three, the winner of the race will be declared the race winner and will collect 40 points. The runner-up will receive 20 points. Third and fourth place drivers will be credited as semifinal losers.

1.5: The U. S. Nationals and Auto Club Finals will have their race points increased by 50% . Drivers who qualify but are eliminated in the first round receive 30 points, and each round win is worth 30 points. The top four receive 10, 9, 8, and 7 points, respectively, for qualifying positions, with the 5–6 drivers receiving 6 points, 7–8 drivers receiving 5 points, 9–12 receiving 4 points, and 13–16 receiving 3 points. Also, the top four, not three, drivers after each session receive points for fastest times in each round (4-3-2-1).

=== Event changes ===
On January 16, 2018, Old Bridge Township Raceway Park in Englishtown, New Jersey ceased all drag racing operations at the facility due to ongoing safety concerns as well as rising maintenance costs. The NHRA Summernationals, already scheduled to take place there in June, was cancelled. Two weeks later, a replacement event was announced at Virginia Motorsports Park in Petersburg, Virginia. The last NHRA professional event at VMP had taken place in 2009.

Because of a series of Monster Energy NASCAR Cup Series date changes, the NHRA changed the dates of numerous rounds to avoid conflicts. The race in Joliet was moved to early June, as the normal date had been reassigned to the NASCAR meeting at the nearby Chicagoland Speedway, and the Countdown dates in Reading and Charlotte were swapped since the Charlotte date would have been too close to the NASCAR road course playoff race.

== Final standings ==
Top Fuel
Pos.	Driver	Points	Points Back	Chassis
1	Steve Torrence	2900	–	MLR
2	Tony Schumacher	2596	−304	DSR (MG)
3	Clay Millican	2573	−327	Hadman
4	Leah Pritchett	2456	−444	DSR (MG)
5	Brittany Force	2417	−483	Force
6	Antron Brown	2378	−522	DSR (MG)
7	Mike Salinas	2308	−592	Scrappers
8	Doug Kalitta	2308	−592	Kalitta
9	Terry McMillen	2301	−599	McMillen
10	Scott Palmer	2231	−669	Thompson

Funny Car
Pos.	Driver	Points	Points Back	Make
1	J.R. Todd	2726	–	Toyota
2	Robert Hight	2532	−194	Chevrolet
3	Tommy Johnson, Jr.	2519	−207	Dodge
4	Ron Capps	2510	−216	Dodge
5	Tim Wilkerson	2418	−308	Ford
6	Courtney Force	2409	−317	Chevrolet
7	Jack Beckman	2405	−321	Dodge
8	Matt Hagan	2371	−355	Dodge
9	John Force	2356	−370	Chevrolet
10	Shawn Langdon	2285	−441	Toyota

Pro Stock
Pos.	Driver	Points	Points Back	Make
1	Tanner Gray	2758	–	Chevrolet
2	Jeg Coughlin, Jr.	2571	−187	Chevrolet
3	Drew Skillman	2559	−199	Chevrolet
4	Erica Enders-Stevens	2525	−233	Chevrolet
5	Jason Line	2472	−286	Chevrolet
6	Vincent Nobile	2452	−306	Chevrolet
7	Greg Anderson	2418	−340	Chevrolet
8	Bo Butner III	2379	−379	Chevrolet
9	Deric Kramer	2268	−490	Chevrolet
10	Chris McGaha	2184	−574	Chevrolet

Pro Stock Motorcycle
Pos.	Driver	Points	Points Back	Make
1	Matt Smith	2666	–	Buell
2	Eddie Krawiec	2627	−39	Harley-Davidson
3	Hector Arana, Jr.	2536	−130	Buell
4	L.E. Tonglet IV	2532	−134	Suzuki
5	Gerald Savoie	2464	−202	Suzuki
6	Andrew Hines	2450	−216	Harley-Davidson
7	Angelle Sampey	2349	−317	Buell
8	Angie Smith	2303	−363	Buell
9	Steve Johnson	2290	−376	Suzuki
10	Scotty Pollacheck	2258	−408	Suzuki
