= 2017 NHRA Mello Yello Drag Racing Series =

2017 NHRA Mello Yello Drag Racing Series season
- League: NHRA
- Sport: Drag racing
- Champions: Brittany Force (TF); Robert Hight (FC); Bo Butner (PS); Eddie Krawiec (PSM)

NHRA seasons
- ← 2016 2018 →

The 2017 NHRA Mello Yello Drag Racing Season was announced on June 8, 2016.

It was the 62nd season of the National Hot Rod Association's top drag racing competition. There were 24 Top Fuel, Funny Car, and Pro Stock events, and 16 Pro Stock Motorcycle events.

== Schedule ==
2017 NHRA Mello Yello Schedule
Date	Race	Site	TV	Winners			
Date	Race	Site	TV	Top Fuel Dragster	Top FUel Funny Car	Pro Stock	PS Motorcycle
Feb 9–12	Circle K NHRA Winternationals	Pomona, CA	Fox	Leah Pritchett (1)	Matt Hagan (1)	Jason Line (1)	N/A
Feb 24–26	NHRA Arizona Nationals	Chandler, AZ	FS1*	Leah Pritchett (2)	Matt Hagan (2)	Greg Anderson (1)	N/A
Mar 16–19	Amalie Motor Oil NHRA Gatornationals	Gainesville, FL	FS1	Tony Schumacher (1)	John Force (1)	Shane Gray (1)	Eddie Krawiec (1)
Mar 31 – Apr 2	DENSO Spark Plugs NHRA Nationals	Las Vegas, NV	FS1	Antron Brown (1)	Tommy Johnson, Jr. (1)	Tanner Gray (1)	N/A
Apr 21–23	NHRA SpringNationals	Baytown, TX	FS1*	Leah Pritchett (3)	Ron Capps (1)	Bo Butner (1)	N/A
Apr 28–30	NHRA Four-Wide Nationals ^{4 Lanes}	Concord, NC	FS1*	Steve Torrence (1)	Ron Capps (2)	Chris McGaha (1)	L.E. Tonglet (1)
May 5–7	Lucas Oil NHRA Southern Nationals	Commerce, GA	FS1*	Steve Torrence (2)	Ron Capps (3)	Bo Butner (2)	L.E. Tonglet (2)
May 19–21	Menards NHRA Heartland Nationals presented by Minties	Topeka, KS	FS1	Antron Brown (2)	Ron Capps (4)	Tanner Gray (2)	N/A
Jun 2–4	NHRA New England Nationals	Epping, NH	FS1*	Brittany Force (1)	Matt Hagan (3)	Erica Enders-Stevens (1)	N/A
Jun 8–11	NHRA Summernationals	Englishtown, NJ	FS1*	Steve Torrence (3)	Jack Beckman (1)	Greg Anderson (2)	Jerry Savoie (1)
Jun 16–18	NHRA Thunder Valley Nationals	Bristol, TN	FS1*	Clay Millican (1)	Ron Capps (5)	Alex Laughlin (1)	N/A
Jun 22–25	Summit Racing Equipment NHRA Nationals	Norwalk, OH	FS1*	Steve Torrence (4)	Jack Beckman (2)	Bo Butner (3)	L.E. Tonglet (3)
Jul 6–9	Fallen Patriots NHRA Route 66 Nationals presented by K&N Filters	Joliet, IL	FS1	Steve Torrence (5)	Ron Capps (6)	Drew Skillman (1)	L.E. Tonglet (4)
Jul 21–23	Mopar Mile-High NHRA Nationals	Morrison, CO	Fox	Antron Brown (3)	Robert Hight (1)	Drew Skillman (2)	Eddie Krawiec (2)
Jul 28–30	Toyota NHRA Sonoma Nationals	Sonoma, CA	FS1	Steve Torrence (6)	J.R. Todd (1)	Tanner Gray (3)	L.E. Tonglet (5)
Aug 4–6	NHRA Northwest Nationals	Kent, WA	Fox	Antron Brown (4)	Robert Hight (2)	Drew Skillman (3)	N/A
Aug 17–20	Lucas Oil NHRA Nationals	Brainerd, MN	FS1	Leah Pritchett (4)	Alexis DeJoria (1)	Tanner Gray (4)	Jerry Savoie (2)
Aug 30 – Sep 4	Chevrolet Performance U.S. Nationals ^{1.5}	Clermont, IN	Fox	Steve Torrence (7)	J.R. Todd (2)	Drew Skillman (4)	Eddie Krawiec (3)
Countdown to the Championship
Sep 15–17	NHRA Carolina Nationals	Concord, NC	FS1	Doug Kalitta (1)	Robert Hight (3)	Tanner Gray (5)	Eddie Krawiec (4)
Sep 21–24	Dodge NHRA Nationals	Mohnton, PA	FS1	Brittany Force (2)	Ron Capps (7)	Bo Butner (4)	Eddie Krawiec (5)
Sep 29 – Oct 1	AAA Insurance NHRA Midwest Nationals	Madison, IL	FS1	Steve Torrence (8)	Ron Capps (8)	Greg Anderson (3)	L.E. Tonglet (6)
Oct 12–15	AAA Texas NHRA FallNationals	Ennis, TX	FS1	Brittany Force (3)	Robert Hight (4)	Jason Line (2)	Eddie Krawiec (6)
Oct 26–29	Toyota NHRA Nationals	Las Vegas, NV	FS1	Terry McMillen (1)	Matt Hagan (4)	Greg Anderson (4)	Eddie Krawiec (7)
Nov 9–12	Auto Club NHRA Finals ^{1.5}	Pomona, CA	FS1	Brittany Force (4)	Tommy Johnson Jr. (2)	Bo Butner (5)	Andrew Hines (1)

* Finals televised on tape delay.

=== Additional Rules for Specially Marked Races ===
4 Lanes: The 4 Wide Nationals will compete with cars on four lanes.

- All cars will qualify on each lane as all four lanes will be used in qualifying.
- Three rounds with cars using all four lanes.
- In Rounds One and Two, the top two drivers (of four) will advance to the next round.
- The pairings are set as follows:
  - Race One: 1, 8, 9, 16
  - Race Two: 4, 5, 12, 13
  - Race Three: 2, 7, 10, 15
  - Race Four: 3, 6, 11, 14
  - Semifinal One: Top two in Race One and Race Two
  - Semifinal Two: Top two in Race Three and Race Four
  - Finals: Top two in Semifinal One and Semifinal Two
- Lane choice determined by times in previous round. In first round, lane choice determined by fastest times.
- Drivers who advance in Rounds One and Two will receive 20 points for each round advancement.
- In Round Three, the winner of the race will be declared the race winner and will collect 40 points. The runner-up will receive 20 points. Third and fourth place drivers will be credited as semifinal losers.

1.5: The U. S. Nationals and Auto Club Finals will have their race points increased by 50% . Drivers who qualify but are eliminated in the first round receive 30 points, and each round win is worth 30 points. The top four receive 10, 9, 8, and 7 points, respectively, for qualifying positions, with the 5–6 drivers receiving 6 points, 7–8 drivers receiving 5 points, 9–12 receiving 4 points, and 13–16 receiving 3 points. Also, the top four, not three, drivers after each session receive points for fastest times in each round (4-3-2-1).

== Final standings ==
Top Fuel
Pos.	Driver	Points	Points Back	Chassis
1	Brittany Force	2690	–	Force
2	Steve Torrence	2609	−81	MLR
3	Doug Kalitta	2553	−137	Kalitta
4	Antron Brown	2508	−182	DSR (MG)
5	Leah Pritchett	2452	−238	DSR (MG)
6	Clay Millican	2419	−271	Hadman
7	Shawn Langdon	2406	−284	Kalitta
8	Tony Schumacher	2395	−295	DSR (MG)
9	Terry McMillen	2310	−380	McMillen
10	Scott Palmer	2218	−472	Thompson

Funny Car
Pos.	Driver	Points	Points Back	Make
1	Robert Hight	2686	–	Chevrolet
2	Ron Capps	2588	−98	Dodge
3	Courtney Force	2543	−143	Chevrolet
4	Jack Beckman	2519	−167	Dodge
5	Matt Hagan	2470	−216	Dodge
6	Tommy Johnson, Jr.	2452	−234	Dodge
7	John Force	2388	−298	Chevrolet
8	Tim Wilkerson	2296	−390	Ford
9	J.R. Todd	2282	−404	Toyota
10	Cruz Pedregon	2178	−508	Toyota

Pro Stock
Pos.	Driver	Points	Points Back	Make
1	Bo Butner III	2731	–	Chevrolet
2	Greg Anderson	2724	−7	Chevrolet
3	Jason Line	2644	−87	Chevrolet
4	Tanner Gray	2558	−173	Chevrolet
5	Drew Skillman	2476	−255	Chevrolet
6	Erica Enders-Stevens	2367	−364	Chevrolet
7	Jeg Coughlin, Jr.	2318	−413	Chevrolet
8	Allen Johnson	2284	−447	Dodge
9	Chris McGaha	2257	−474	Chevrolet
10	Vincent Nobile	2052	−679	Chevrolet

Pro Stock Motorcycle
Pos.	Driver	Points	Points Back	Make
1	Eddie Krawiec	2783	–	Harley-Davidson
2	Andrew Hines	2614	−169	Harley-Davidson
3	L.E. Tonglet IV	2591	−192	Suzuki
4	Scotty Pollacheck	2492	−291	Suzuki
5	Gerald Savoie	2472	−311	Suzuki
6	Matt Smith	2454	−329	Victory
7	Hector Arana, Jr.	2453	−330	Buell
8	Karen Stoffer	2301	−482	Suzuki
9	Joey Gladstone	2280	−503	Suzuki
10	Angie Smith	2258	−525	Buell
