= 2016 NHRA Mello Yello Drag Racing Series =

2016 NHRA Mello Yello Drag Racing Series season
- League: NHRA
- Sport: Drag racing
- Champions: Antron Brown (TF); Ron Capps (FC); Jason Line (PS); Jerry Savoie (PSM)

NHRA seasons
- ← 2015 2017 →

The 2016 NHRA Mello Yello Drag Racing Season was announced on September 5, 2015.

There were 24 Top Fuel, Funny Car, and Pro Stock car events, and 16 Pro Stock Motorcycle events scheduled.

== Schedule ==
2016 NHRA Mello Yello Schedule
Date	Race	Site	TV	Winners			
Date	Race	Site	TV	Top Fuel	Funny Car	Pro Stock	PS Motorcycle
February 11–14	Circle K NHRA Winternationals	Pomona, California	FS1	Steve Torrence (1)	Ron Capps (1)	Greg Anderson (1)	N/A
February 26–28	CARQUEST Auto Parts NHRA Arizona Nationals	Phoenix, Arizona	FS1	Leah Pritchett (1)	Tim Wilkerson (1)	Jason Line (1)	N/A
March 17–20	Amalie Motor Oil NHRA Gatornationals	Gainesville, Florida.	FS1	Brittany Force (1)	Robert Hight (1)	Greg Anderson (2)	Eddie Krawiec (1)
April 1–3	Denso Spark Plugs NHRA Nationals	Las Vegas, Nevada	FS1	Antron Brown (1)	Alexis DeJoria (1)	Jason Line (2)	N/A
April 22–24	NHRA Four-Wide Nationals presented by Lowes Foods	Concord, North Carolina	FS1*	Brittany Force (2)	Tim Wilkerson (2)	Jason Line (3)	Andrew Hines (1)
April 29 – May 1	NHRA SpringNationals	Houston, Texas	FS1	Doug Kalitta (1)	Courtney Force (1)	Greg Anderson (3)	N/A
May 13–15	NHRA Southern Nationals	Atlanta, Georgia	FS1*	Doug Kalitta (2)	Matt Hagan (1)	Jason Line (4)	Eddie Krawiec (2)
May 20–22	NHRA Kansas Nationals	Topeka, Kansas	FS1	Doug Kalitta (3)	Matt Hagan (2)	Jason Line (5)	N/A
June 3–5	NHRA New England Nationals	Epping, N.H.	FS1*	Antron Brown (2)	Ron Capps (2)	Greg Anderson (4)	N/A
June 9–12	NHRA Summernationals	Englishtown, New Jersey	FS1*	Steve Torrence (2)	Ron Capps (3)	Greg Anderson (5)	Angelle Sampey (1)
June 17–19	NHRA Thunder Valley Nationals	Bristol, Tennessee	FS1*	Shawn Langdon (1)	Tommy Johnson, Jr. (1)	Jason Line (6)	N/A
June 23–26	Summit Racing Equipment NHRA Nationals	Norwalk, Ohio	FS2*	Shawn Langdon (2)	Ron Capps (4)	Jason Line (7)	Eddie Krawiec (3)
July 7–10	K&N Route 66 NHRA Nationals	Chicago, Illinois	FS1	Antron Brown (3)	Jack Beckman (1)	Greg Anderson (6)	Andrew Hines (2)
July 22–24	Mopar Mile-High NHRA Nationals	Denver, Colorado	Fox	Tony Schumacher (1)	John Force (1)	Allen Johnson (1)	Andrew Hines (3)
July 29–31	Toyota NHRA Sonoma Nationals	Sonoma, California	Fox	J.R. Todd (1)	John Force (2)	Greg Anderson (7)	L.E. Tonglet (1)
August 5–7	Protect The Harvest.com NHRA Northwest Nationals^{2}	Seattle, Washington	Fox	Races abandoned after semifinals.			N/A
August 18–21	Lucas Oil NHRA Nationals	Brainerd, Minnesota	FS1*	Antron Brown (4)	Ron Capps (5)	Drew Skillman (1)	Andrew Hines (4)
August 18–21	Lucas Oil NHRA Nationals	Brainerd, Minnesota	FS1*	Brittany Force (3)	Del Worsham (1)	Drew Skillman (1)	Andrew Hines (4)
August 31 – September 5	Chevrolet Performance NHRA U.S. Nationals	Clermont, IN	FS1*/Fox	Tony Schumacher (2)	Matt Hagan (3)	Aaron Strong (1)	Andrew Hines (5)
August 31 – September 5	Chevrolet Performance NHRA U.S. Nationals	Clermont, IN	FS1*/Fox	Tony Schumacher (2)	Matt Hagan (3)	Chris McGaha (1)	Andrew Hines (5)
2016 Countdown to One
September 16–18	NHRA Carolina Nationals	Concord, N.C.	FS1	Antron Brown (5)	John Force (3)	Jason Line (8)	Chip Ellis (1)
September 23–25	AAA Insurance NHRA Midwest Nationals	St. Louis, Missouri	FS1	Shawn Langdon (3)	Jack Beckman (2)	Alex Laughlin (1)	Jerry Savoie (1)
September 29 – October 2	Dodge NHRA Nationals	Reading, Pennsylvania	FS1	Antron Brown (6)	Tommy Johnson, Jr. (2)	Vincent Nobile (1)	Eddie Krawiec (4)
October 13–16	AAA Texas NHRA Fall Nationals	Dallas, Texas	FS1	Antron Brown (7)	Matt Hagan (4)	Drew Skillman (2)	Eddie Krawiec (5)
October 27–30	NHRA Toyota Nationals	Las Vegas, Nevada	FS1	Steve Torrence (3)	John Force (4)	Shane Gray (1)	Jerry Savoie (2)
November 10–13	Automobile Club of Southern California NHRA Finals	Pomona, California	FS1	Doug Kalitta (4)	Tommy Johnson, Jr. (3)	Greg Anderson (8)	Matt Smith (1)

^{1} The rules for the 4-Wide Nationals differ from other races:

- All cars will qualify on each lane as all four lanes will be used in qualifying.
- Three rounds with cars using all four lanes.
- In Rounds One and Two, the top two drivers (of four) will advance to the next round.
- The pairings are set as follows:
  - Race One: 1, 8, 9, 16
  - Race Two: 4, 5, 12, 13
  - Race Three: 2, 7, 10, 15
  - Race Four: 3, 6, 11, 14
  - Semifinal One: Top two in Race One and Race Two
  - Semifinal Two: Top two in Race Three and Race Four
  - Finals: Top two in Semifinal One and Semifinal Two
- Lane choice determined by times in previous round. In first round, lane choice determined by fastest times.
- Drivers who advance in Rounds One and Two will receive 20 points for each round advancement.
- In Round Three, the winner of the race will be declared the race winner and will collect 40 points. The runner-up will receive 20 points. Third and fourth place drivers will be credited as semifinal losers.

^{2} Races at Pacific Raceway abandoned after semifinals because of rain and could not be finished because of ordinances in county. There were two Top Fuel and Funny Car finals at Brainerd, and two Pro Stock finals at the U. S. Nationals (the NHRA and the two finalists agreed to conduct it at Clermont). The first winner listed is the Saturday race, while the second winner is the Sunday (Brainerd) or Monday (U. S. Nationals) race.

- * Finals televised on tape delay. Otherwise, finals will be televised live. Note at Norwalk, the first two rounds were televised live on Fox Sports 1, and the remainder aired on tape delay on Fox Sports 2 after the NASCAR race, as Fox Sports 1 had coverage of the 2016 Copa America final. The first Brainerd Top Fuel and Funny Car, and the first Lucas Oil Raceway Pro Stock (car) final aired on tape delay (FS1). The Pro Stock (car and motorcycle) and the second Top Fuel and Funny Car finals at Brainerd aired live. At the U. S. Nationals, the Top Fuel, Funny Car, Pro Stock Motorcycle finals and the second Pro Stock (car) finals will air on Fox live.

== Notable events ==
- NHRA and ESPN mutually agreed to end their television coverage agreement following the 2015 season. The 2016 season was to be the final year of a five-year rights extension deal that took effect in 2012.
- NHRA and Fox Sports jointly announced that starting in 2016 the NHRA Mello Yello Drag Racing Series will be televised by Fox Sports 1 (FS1). The channel will provide coverage of Friday and Saturday qualifying and Sunday eliminations for each NHRA Mello Yello Series event, with a minimum of 16 Sunday eliminations shows to be presented in a live coverage format. The Western Swing and the U. S. Nationals will be broadcast live on the Fox broadcast network, whose broadcasts will be labeled as Fox NHRA. All tape-delayed races will air as same-day delays after FS1 NASCAR coverage.
- NHRA and Fox Sports jointly announced the TV schedule for 2016, although with the addition of the Topeka race in December (the NHRA was legally unable to announce the Topeka race until new ownership group was confirmed), the television schedule for the Kansas round, which does not have a NASCAR conflict, it is expected to be live.
- The NHRA will cease offering points for setting a national record elapsed time, and will no longer require a run to be backed up within one percent in order to set the record, as points are not offered for such records.

== Final standings ==
Top Fuel
Pos.	Driver	Points	Points Back	Chassis
1	Antron Brown	2663	–	DSR (MG)
2	Doug Kalitta	2533	−130	Kalitta
3	Steve Torrence	2482	−181	MLR
4	J.R. Todd	2455	−208	Kalitta
5	Shawn Langdon	2443	−220	DSR (MG)
6	Brittany Force	2399	−264	Force
7	Leah Pritchett	2389	−274	DSR (MG)
8	Tony Schumacher	2387	−276	DSR (MG)
9	Richie Crampton	2279	−384	MLR
10	Clay Millican	2264	−399	Hadman

Funny Car
Pos.	Driver	Points	Points Back	Make
1	Ron Capps	2605	–	Dodge
2	Tommy Johnson, Jr.	2553	−52	Dodge
3	Matt Hagan	2493	−112	Dodge
4	John Force	2486	−119	Chevrolet
5	Jack Beckman	2480	−125	Dodge
6	Courtney Force	2414	−191	Chevrolet
7	Del Worsham	2406	−199	Toyota
8	Robert Hight	2368	−237	Chevrolet
9	Tim Wilkerson	2314	−291	Ford
10	Alexis DeJoria	2184	−421	Toyota

Pro Stock
Pos.	Driver	Points	Points Back	Make
1	Jason Line	2639	–	Chevrolet
2	Greg Anderson	2636	−3	Chevrolet
3	Shane Gray	2492	−147	Chevrolet
4	Bo Butner III	2453	−186	Chevrolet
5	Vincent Nobile	2449	−190	Chevrolet
6	Drew Skillman	2424	−215	Chevrolet
7	Chris McGaha	2327	−312	Chevrolet
8	Allen Johnson	2277	−362	Dodge
9	Erica Enders-Stevens	2239	−400	Dodge
10	Jeg Coughlin, Jr.	2208	−431	Dodge

Pro Stock Motorcycle
Pos.	Driver	Points	Points Back	Make
1	Gerald Savoie	2595	–	Suzuki
2	Eddie Krawiec	2571	−24	Harley-Davidson
3	Andrew Hines	2564	−31	Harley-Davidson
4	Angelle Sampey	2495	−100	Buell
5	Chip Ellis	2415	−180	Buell
6	Matt Smith	2389	−206	Victory
7	L.E. Tonglet IV	2372	−223	Suzuki
8	Hector Arana, Jr.	2315	−280	Buell
9	Cory Reed	2312	−283	Stinnett
10	Hector Arana	2279	−316	Buell
