= Impact of the COVID-19 pandemic on motorsport =

The COVID-19 pandemic caused disruption to motorsport across the world, mirroring its impact across all sports. Across the world and to varying degrees, events and competitions were cancelled or postponed. Motorsport UK - the governing body for the sport in the UK - announced in March that no sanctioned events would take place until May before extending that to the end of June, due to the UK's lockdown following the spread of COVID-19.

== Australian Supercars ==
The Supercars Championship had planned to hold the Melbourne 400 supporting the Australian Grand Prix. The event was cancelled the same time the Grand Prix was also cancelled. Although the Championship were seeking to hold a replacement event later in the year, it was ultimately not made up. The Supercars' Tasmania Super400 at Symmons Plains Raceway (originally scheduled for 4–5 April), the Auckland Super400 at Hampton Downs (25–26 April), and the Perth SuperNight at Wanneroo Raceway (16–17 May) rounds were also postponed beyond June. The pandemic saw 23Red Racing withdraw from the championship as its primary sponsor, Milwaukee Tools, ended its deal with the team.

A revised calendar was released on 17 May, with the events at Gold Coast and Newcastle dropped from the calendar and a second race at Bathurst to be held in February 2021. As well, the Melbourne 400 will still count as a round because practice and qualifying had taken place before the event was cancelled. After a second revision on 19 June, the second Bathurst round was reassigned to be part of the 2021 season (replacing the Intercontinental GT Challenge round at Bathurst cancelled because of international travel restrictions), with the Sydney SuperNight round being restored and acting as the season finale. Further revisions saw rounds at Winton, Sandown, Symmons Plains, Wanneroo and the Sydney SuperNight being cancelled, and the Bathurst 1000 now becoming the finale.

Supercars formed the All Stars Eseries to allow its drivers to compete against each other.

== Deutsche Tourenwagen Masters ==
The Deutsche Tourenwagen Masters series postponed the start of its championship until August 2020. The Norisring round, which was scheduled on 10–12 July, was cancelled because of the difficulties of assembling the infrastructure required for a street circuit and impossibility to be held behind closed doors.

== Drag racing ==
On March 12, the National Hot Rod Association suspended its season while some sportsman classes were already contesting the Amalie Motor Oil NHRA Gatornationals; the sportsman classes already active at that time would finish their runs behind closed doors, while the professional and remaining sportsman classes were sent home.

The season schedule was revised several times during the suspension, with the season eventually being shortened to eleven events from the original twenty-four; the Countdown to the Championship was scrapped for the season amid the first bouts of the rescheduling. As a result of these changes, with the current schedule revealed as of September 2, Las Vegas saw its two events consolidated into one (which, after the September 2 schedule revisions, became the season finale) with Pomona also reduced to a single race (held prior to the pandemic); the Virginia NHRA Nationals, Summit Racing Equipment NHRA Nationals, Route 66 NHRA Nationals, NHRA Sonoma Nationals, MagicDry Organic Absorbent NHRA Northwest Nationals, and NHRA New England Nationals were removed from the schedule for the season in the earliest schedule modifications; and three additional events were announced in two bursts for Lucas Oil Raceway to relaunch the season from July 11 in order to initially compensate for cancelled events. The Dodge Mile-High NHRA Nationals and Lucas Oil NHRA Nationals were subsequently postponed on July 17, in conjunction with the third additional event at Lucas Oil Raceway added to the former's original dates; the Menards NHRA Heartland Nationals would also subsequently be postponed on July 29, followed by the cancellation of the Southern Nationals on August 10 and the Mopar Express Lane NHRA Nationals on August 17. Further schedule revisions on September 2 saw the schedule reduced further, with the three postponed events that were awaiting rescheduling as well as both Charlotte events (which had initially been consolidated to a single event in earlier schedule revisions), the Thunder Valley Nationals (for logistics reasons), and technically, the other Las Vegas Motor Speedway round (the Las Vegas round, known as the Dodge NHRA Vegas Nationals, was officially cancelled). The NHRA Finals at Pomona was legally moved to the Las Vegas meeting, which is known as the Dodge NHRA Finals (sponsors kept their contracts, but the 2020 Las Vegas race belongs to the World Finals lineage). leaving six previously scheduled events including the rescheduled aforementioned Gatornationals to finish out the season.

The rescheduling has created an event-name related oddity, in that the Mopar Express Lane NHRA SpringNationals have retained its name for the season despite now being scheduled for the weekend after the AAA NHRA Fall Nationals in October.

Despite the pandemic, the NHRA was able to host all races were held with spectators in attendance.

The NHRA then announced the 2021 NHRA season would start at the Gatornationals in March, with the sanctioning body moving the Winternationals and Arizona Nationals to April, hoping that spectator restrictions will be eased by that time. On 15 January 2021, the NHRA announced that the Wild Horse Pass Motorsports Park round would be moved to another venue to be determined. On 16 March 2021, the NHRA announced the Auto Club Raceway at Pomona Winternationals was postponed. On 5 May 2021, the NHRA postponed the round at Virginia Motorsports Park while restoring the round at Bristol Dragway, which moves from June (a date clash with the NASCAR weekend in Gladeville, TN) to October. On 14 May 2021, with King County, Washington restrictions still questionable, Pacific Raceways was removed, with the Lucas Oil Winternationals moving to the August date.

Since 2023, the NHRA changes have become permanent. Gainesville starts the season.

== Formula racing ==
=== Formula One ===
==== 2020 ====
The early 2020 Formula One season was disrupted by the coronavirus pandemic. Prior to the start of the season, Ferrari and AlphaTauri expressed concern about the spread of the virus and its effect on the championship. Both teams are based in Italy, which has suffered one of the worst outbreaks of the virus outside China, and so both Ferrari and AlphaTauri were therefore concerned over the ability of their staff to leave a quarantine zone that was established in northern Italy. Ross Brawn, the managing director of the sport, announced that Grands Prix would not go ahead if a team were blocked from entering a host nation, but that events could go ahead if a team voluntarily chose not to enter a host nation.

The season opening Australian race was abruptly cancelled shortly before the start of the first free practice session, while the Monaco and French races were eventually cancelled. The cancellation of the Monaco Grand Prix meant that 2020 would mark the first time since 1954 that the race has not been held. The Azerbaijan, Bahrain, Canadian, Dutch, Spanish and Vietnamese Grands Prix were postponed, while the Chinese Grand Prix had already been postponed prior to the pandemic. The Dutch Grand Prix would eventually be cancelled on 28 May, the Azerbaijan Grand Prix would eventually be cancelled on 12 June, along with Singapore (due to logistical difficulties associated with establishing a street circuit on short notice) and Japanese (due to travel restrictions by Japanese government). The Canadian Grand Prix would be cancelled on 24 July along with races in Mexico, United States and Brazil due to the travel restrictions in the Americas, while the Spanish Grand Prix would be rescheduled to 16 August on 2 June. On 24 August, the Bahrain Grand Prix would be rescheduled to 29 November and the Chinese Grand Prix was cancelled. On 16 October, the Vietnamese Grand Prix was cancelled. Organizers of the Austrian, British and Hungarian Grands Prix were the first to announce that their races could go ahead, but run without spectators and with teams staffed by minimal personnel. The summer break shut down period—which includes mandatory factory closures as a cost-cutting measure—was also brought forward from August to March and April and was originally extended to three weeks, allowing for postponed races to be held in August.

The sport had planned to overhaul its technical regulations for the 2021 championship in one of the largest changes in its seventy-year history. The pandemic prompted these changes to be postponed until 2022, with teams required to enter their 2020 cars in the 2021 championship to minimise the financial stress placed on the teams. The sport had also planned to introduce a $175 million budget cap in 2021, which was later revised to $150 million. Teams called for further revisions to $100 million, arguing that the pandemic threatened the future of four of the ten teams.

In March 2020, some Formula One drivers entered virtual versions of several races dubbed "Not The GP". The races were hosted by Jean-Éric Vergne's Veloce Esports, in partnership with Formula One. The online races were contested by current and former Formula One drivers, like Lando Norris, Nicholas Latifi, Stoffel Vandoorne, Esteban Gutiérrez, Emerson Fittipaldi, Nico Hülkenberg, Johnny Herbert and Martin Brundle, as well as celebrities and other sportsmen; Norris in particular, alongside Alex Albon, George Russell, and Charles Leclerc, would spend most of the offseason livestreaming on Twitch. On 29 June 2020, ahead of the season opening race in Austria, McLaren took a loan of £150m from the National Bank of Bahrain to mitigate the effect of coronavirus on the company.

The first few races of the rescheduled 2020 season, included the Austrian, Styrian, Hungarian and two Grands Prix at Silverstone, which all took place in "bio-secure" conditions behind closed doors.

A day prior to the British Grand Prix, Racing Point driver Sergio Pérez was confirmed to have tested positive for the virus following an inconclusive result earlier in the day, ruling him out of the race. Nico Hülkenberg was announced as his replacement for that race, and as well as the 70th Anniversary Grand Prix the following weekend.

Williams was sold to Dorilton Capital due to financial pressures, ending family ownership of and involvement with the team.

Racing Point driver Lance Stroll missed the Eifel Grand Prix after falling ill, which was later diagnosed as COVID-19. He was replaced by Hülkenberg. Lawrence Stroll, owner of the Racing Point team and father of Lance, also tested positive.

On 30 November 2020, a day after winning the Bahrain Grand Prix, Drivers' Champion Lewis Hamilton announced that he had tested positive for COVID-19, claiming to have been experiencing "mild symptoms". During the week leading to the race, he underwent three tests, but all returned negative. Mercedes confirmed that Hamilton would miss the Sakhir Grand Prix in Bahrain later that week as a result. He was replaced by George Russell from Williams who was in turn replaced by Jack Aitken.

==== 2021 ====
Prior to the beginning of the 2021 season, three more drivers – Norris, Charles Leclerc and Pierre Gasly – and Mercedes team principal Toto Wolff all tested positive for COVID-19 in separate occasions. On the eve of pre-season testing at Bahrain, Alfa Romeo team principal Frédéric Vasseur tested positive for COVID-19, hence unable to accompany the team for testing. Prior to the British Grand Prix, McLaren team principal Zak Brown tested positive.

In January 2021, more changes were made to the 2021 Formula One World Championship, with the 2021 Australian Grand Prix being postponed from 21 March all the way to 21 November. However, the event would be cancelled on 6 July 2021 for the second consecutive year due to Australia's strict quarantine protocols and travel restrictions to the state of Victoria, where it is held. The race was replaced with the inaugural Qatar Grand Prix. The Chinese Grand Prix was postponed for the second consecutive year, and would be cancelled. The event was originally to run on 11 April.

In response to this, two GPs would have to fill in the vacancies and F1 chose to run the Emilia Romagna Grand Prix on 18 April and the Portuguese Grand Prix on 2 May. These were announced in January and February 2021 respectively, just before the season started.

Further with cancellations, the Canadian Grand Prix was cancelled for the second year running and was replaced by the Turkish Grand Prix. The original date for the GP was 13 June. A month later on 14 May, the Turkish Grand Prix was postponed due to travel restrictions, before being reinstated onto the calendar after the Singapore Grand Prix was subsequently cancelled for another consecutive year. The schedule was changed so that the 2021 French Grand Prix would be moved up a week from 27 June to 20 June, and that the Styrian Grand Prix would take its original slot. The Austrian Grand Prix took place on its original date of 4 July. The Japanese Grand Prix was then announced on August 18 cancelled for a second consecutive year.

=== Formula 2 and Formula 3 ===
The Bahrain and Barcelona rounds of the FIA Formula 2 and Formula 3 Championships—a series of races for junior drivers that run in support of Formula 1 events—were postponed when the Bahrain and Spanish Grands Prix were postponed. The Monaco and Zandvoort Formula 2 rounds were cancelled when the Monaco and Dutch Grands Prix were cancelled and the Baku round cancelled when the Azerbaijan Grand Prix was cancelled. The Yas Marina round, which was scheduled to support Abu Dhabi Grand Prix was cancelled due to maximum slot for the calendar as an impact of the pandemic. Formula 3 had not been scheduled to race in Monaco or Azerbaijan, but the Dutch round was also cancelled, along with Russia and Bahrain due to maximum slot for the calendar as an impact of the pandemic.

== Formula E ==
The Formula E championship for electric cars initially responded to the pandemic by postponing the Rome and Sanya ePrix. Planned races in Paris, Jakarta and Seoul were also postponed, prompting organisers to postpone the entire season by two months.

On 17 June it was announced that the series would finish at the Tempelhof Airport Street Circuit with three double headers on three different layouts in August, and that the races in Rome, Sanya, Paris, Jakarta, Seoul, New York and London have been cancelled.

== GT World Challenge Europe ==
The 3 Hours of Monza round of the 2020 GT World Challenge Europe Endurance Cup, scheduled for 19 April, was cancelled.

== IndyCar ==
In wake of the Rudy Gobert and NBA situation, the IndyCar Series initially announced on 12 March that it would hold the Grand Prix of St. Petersburg — the opening race of the 2020 season — behind closed doors. On 13 March in respect of the NBA suspension, the series announced that it would cancel all races through at least the end of April, including St. Petersburg, Alabama, Long Beach, and Austin. IndyCar intended to begin the season with the traditional "Month of May" races at Indianapolis Motor Speedway, including the GMR Grand Prix (held on IMS's road course configuration), and the 104th running of the Indianapolis 500 on its traditional Memorial Day Sunday date. IndyCar formed the IndyCar iRacing Challenge, with its drivers racing against one another on the iRacing racing simulation game.

On 26 March, IndyCar announced that it would postpone the two Indianapolis races to later in the season—moving the GMR Grand Prix to the Fourth of July as support for the NASCAR Cup Series' Brickyard 400 (and creating a rare NASCAR/IndyCar double-header with the Xfinity Series' Pennzoil 150), and the 500 to 23 August—marking the first time in history that it has not been held in May. Therefore, the season was to tentatively begin with the Detroit Grand Prix. The Grand Prix of St. Petersburg was reinstated as the planned season finale, with a date to be determined. On 6 April, IndyCar announced that the Detroit Grand Prix had been canceled. To make up for other canceled races, it was announced that a third race at Indianapolis (the IndyCar Harvest GP, a second race on the track's road course) would be added to the schedule in October, and that the Iowa 300 and Monterey Grand Prix would become twin race weekends with two points-paying races each.

On 7 May, IndyCar officially announced that the season would begin 6 June with the Genesys 300 at Texas Motor Speedway, with races held with limited spectators (only those that owned units in the Turn 2 Lone Star Tower were allowed to attend the race, a practice that began at the NASCAR weekend in Charlotte that is also owned by Sonic Automotive) and with enhanced safety protocols until further notice. To accommodate same-day qualifying and practice, the race was shortened from its usual 248-lap (600 kilometer) distance to 200 laps (300 miles). Although circuit president Eddie Gossage originally insisted that he would not allow the race to be held unless as support for a NASCAR event (the postponed March NASCAR tripleheader was rescheduled for July), he later came to terms with new series owner Roger Penske. The NASCAR Gander RV & Outdoors Truck Series race scheduled after the originally scheduled Friday qualifying of the INDYCAR weekend was postponed to October 25, becoming part of the Cup Series Texas 500 race day and allowing spectators. On 21 May, IndyCar announced the cancellation of the Honda Indy Toronto and Indy Richmond 300 events due to local restrictions, and that the REV Group Grand Prix at Road America would become a twin-race weekend and assume Toronto's date on the schedule.

On 1 June, IndyCar announced that the 2020 season of its developmental Indy Lights circuit had been scrapped because of logistics and a lack of entries. On 8 June, Penske stated his preference for the Indianapolis 500 to not be held behind closed doors, and that he would be willing to delay the event to October if state restrictions are not sufficiently loosened by August. On 26 June, IndyCar and IMS announced that the 500 would be held with spectators, limited to half of its normal capacity. This was later changed to 25 percent capacity, then to behind closed doors in a final announcement on 4 August. By September, the Speedway announced there would be up to 10,000 tickets available for spectators for the third series meeting, the Harvest Classic, seated in the grandstands in the Snake Pit section and Turn 1 of the road course.

For 2021, IndyCar moved street races again because of the pandemic, and a related date change was also made because of it. The St. Petersburg race was moved from 7 March to 25 April and the Grand Prix of Long Beach from 18 April to 26 September because of, respectively, attendance restrictions and a stay-at-home order. The Grand Prix of Alabama at Barber Motorsports Park, originally set for 25 April, was announced as the new season opener on 11 April. With Long Beach moved, INDYCAR and NBC Sports moved that round back a week to 18 April, to avoid the season opener from being up against the final round of golf's Masters Tournament that is held in Augusta, Georgia, which is 375 km east of Leeds, Alabama via Interstate 20.

On 14 May, the Honda Indy Toronto was cancelled by officials. IndyCar intended to replace this race, but for the premiership NTT IndyCar Series ended up not doing so; therefore, the series now has a four-week break planned from the beginning of July to the beginning of August. The Road to Indy support races as part of the Honda Indy Toronto were moved to Mid-Ohio Sports Car Course in October as its own standalone date.

On 21 April, it was announced that the 2021 Indianapolis 500 would be capped at 135,000 fans, or roughly 40% capacity. The sold-out event became the largest sporting event since the Pandemic had begun in March, 2020.

== MotoGP ==
=== Cancelled races ===
The MotoGP World Championship cancelled the opening round of the 2020 championship in Qatar. The Moto2 and Moto3 support categories raced in the country, as the teams were already in Qatar for their final preseason test before the quarantine measures were put in place. Planned events in Thailand, the United States, and Argentina were also postponed, but were initially rescheduled to 4 October, 15 and 22 November respectively (The United States round was cancelled entirely on 8 July). The races at Jerez, Le Mans, and Catalunya were also postponed, but later rescheduled to 19 July (with a second round to be held on 26 July), 27 September, and 11 October respectively, while the Mugello, Sachensring, Assen, Silverstone, Phillip Island, Motegi, Kymi Ring, Termas de Rio Hondo, Circuit of The Americas, Sepang, and Buriram rounds were removed.

=== Rescheduled calendar ===
The pandemic forced the calendar to be rescheduled. On 11 June, the season is to contain 5 "double-headers" on consecutive weekends at Jerez (with the second round under the name of Andalusian Grand Prix), Austria (with the second round under the name of Styrian Grand Prix), Misano (with the second round under the name of Emilia-Romagna Grand Prix), Aragon (with the second round under the name of Teruel Grand Prix), and Valencia (with the first round under the name of European Grand Prix and revived since 1995) to achieve a minimum of 13 races. On 10 August, the season finale would see the return of the Portuguese Grand Prix since 2012 at the Algarve International Circuit, making the Valencia round, which had been the season finale since 2002, the penultimate round for the 2020 season.

=== Infected riders ===
There were 4 riders that missed races due to testing positive for the virus or coming into close contact with individuals who were infected by the virus. In mid-September, Moto2 rider Jorge Martín missed both Misano rounds, becoming the first rider in all classes who to test positive for the virus. For the second Misano round he was replaced by Mattia Pasini. In mid-October, Valentino Rossi missed both Aragon rounds due to testing positive for the SARS-CoV-2 virus, becoming the first premier class rider to test positive. His team decided not to field a replacement for him before the Teruel round, deciding to only field his teammate, Maverick Viñales. As Rossi missed the race (along with defending champion Marc Márquez who was absent since the Andalusian Grand Prix due to his crash at the previous round), the first Aragon race marked the first time since 1999 at Rio de Janeiro when no current or former premier class Champion lined up on the grid. In the Moto3 class at the same venue, Tony Arbolino, despite testing negative for COVID-19, was forced to miss the Aragon Grand Prix as he had come into close contact with an infected passenger on his flight after the French Grand Prix and was required to self-isolate as a result. He was not replaced for that event and was back to racing at the Teruel Grand Prix. In early November, three days before the European Grand Prix at Valencia, Tech3 rider Iker Lecuona was forced to sit out of the race, due to Andorran quarantine rules for close contact with individuals who tested positive for the SARS-CoV-2 virus. His brother – with whom he lived in Andorra – and his personal assistant both tested positive for the virus on 3 November, meaning Lecuona was forced into a mandatory quarantine of 10 days minimum. Tech3 elected not to replace him on such short notice. Lecuona also missed the Valencian Grand Prix after he subsequently tested positive for the virus shortly before the beginning of the race weekend, and subsequently the Portuguese Grand Prix on the following weekend. KTM factory test rider Mika Kallio replaced Lecuona in Portugal. Lecuona became the second premier class rider who has missed races because of isolation.

=== 2021 ===
The 2021 MotoGP World Championship continued to be disrupted by the COVID-19 pandemic. The Australian Motorcycle Grand Prix at Phillip Island was formally cancelled for the second consecutive year, following failed negotiations with state and federal health officials over border restrictions caused by the highly transmissible Delta strain of the virus. The rounds in Finland, Japan, Thailand, and Malaysia were also cancelled over the course of the season due to ongoing pandemic-related travel complications and logistical restrictions.

== AMA Supercross Championship ==
The Monster Energy AMA Supercross Series postponed its scheduled race card at Lucas Oil Stadium in Indianapolis just before it was to occur on 14 March. On 25 March, officials announced the postponement of six more events. The cards – consisting of the 450cc class and one of two 250cc classes each – were rescheduled for seven consecutive dates between 31 May and 21 June. All of them occurred behind closed doors at Rice-Eccles Stadium in Salt Lake City, Utah.

The Supercross All Star event, Monster Energy Cup, was scheduled for 10 October at Dignity Health Sports Park for the first time in history after being in Las Vegas at Sam Boyd Stadium for the first 9 year of the event. It was removed on 30 July because there was not enough time between the outdoor motocross nationals and the event for rides to rest and train for the event.

The 2021 Supercross schedule was announced in December 2020, and in keeping with continued ramifications of the pandemic, nearly the entire schedule was held in just six locations. Each stop, except for Salt Lake City, featured three races (Salt Lake City only had two races). Of the five areas, four had a split Saturday-Tuesday-Saturday schedule (Houston, Indianapolis, Arlington, Hampton). The fifth area with a stop, Central Florida, featured two consecutive Saturdays with races in Orlando before a week off to be followed by the Daytona Beach stop (which is promoted by NASCAR, not Feld Entertainment). Atlanta Motor Speedway became the fourth different Atlanta metropolitan venue to host Supercross. For the first time since Supercross began, no races were held in California.

The Lucas Oil Pro Motocross Championship original schedule for 2020 contested of 12 rounds starting in late May and ending in late August. The number of events was reduced to nine rounds at seven venues. The Loretta Lynn's Amateur Championship was added as a result of the pandemic, with two rounds of professional motocross at the said event, and Red Bud MX also had 2 rounds of racing due to the pandemic.

== NASCAR Holdings ==
=== NASCAR National Series ===
==== 2020 season ====
In the wake of the Rudy Gobert and NBA situation on the Wednesday of the 2020 Folds of Honor QuikTrip 500 week that was scheduled to be held starting Friday, part of the 2020 NASCAR Cup Series, NASCAR announced that the events would be held behind closed doors; this event, along with the Dixie Vodka 400 at Homestead-Miami Speedway, were later postponed in respect of the NBA. On 16 March, NASCAR announced that all race events through 3 May were postponed, however they still intend to run all 36 races for the season. On 17 April, NASCAR announced that it had postponed the Blue-Emu Maximum Pain Relief 500 (9 May at Martinsville Speedway), but that they still intend to run a full schedule of 36 races. NASCAR began to organize invitational eSports events on iRacing, the eNASCAR iRacing Pro Invitational Series.

On 30 April 2020, NASCAR announced that it would resume races in a modified schedule, with seven events across its three national series (including two Cup Series doubleheaders, and Xfinity Series and Gander RV & Outdoors Truck Series events) at Darlington Raceway and Charlotte Motor Speedway from 17 to 27 May. NASCAR stated that it still planned to run its full schedule of races, but that where events would be held beyond these May races was subject to change, with a tentative plan to focus primarily on "classic" tracks in the Southeastern United States (within driving distance of Charlotte—where the majority of NASCAR staff and teams are based). NASCAR announced the next set of races on 14 May (through late-June), formally cancelling originally scheduled races in late-May and early-June, and shifting postponed or rescheduled events in their place at Bristol Motor Speedway (Bristol, Tennessee), Atlanta Motor Speedway, Martinsville, Homestead-Miami, and Talladega Superspeedway. On 2 June, NASCAR announced the third phase of the revised schedule through early-August, including a mid-week NASCAR All-Star Race on 15 July at Bristol (as part of a double-header with the NASCAR-owned ARCA Menards Series), and a Thursday race at Kansas Speedway.

The Cup Series returned with the 56th running, and first since November 2004, of The Real Heroes 400 on 17 May (in support of The Real Heroes Project—a collaboration of U.S. sports leagues honoring front line health care workers), followed by a rare Wednesday-night race (the first since the 1984 Firecracker 400), the Toyota 500 (km) on 20 May (the first scheduled 300-mile Cup Series race since 1963 at the circuit). The Xfinity Series returned on 19 May with the Toyota 200, while all three series raced their regularly scheduled Memorial Day weekend events at Charlotte Motor Speedway. In the Cup Series, this included two events — the 61st running of the Coca-Cola 600 on Sunday, and the 500 kilometer Alsco Uniforms 500 on the following Wednesday.

The first wave of races was held mostly behind closed doors with only essential staff present and team sizes capped at 16, physical distancing requirements for garages and spotters, additional protective equipment for drivers and pit crew members, random temperature checks and removal of symptomatic team members, and requiring teams to perform contact tracing logs. Charlotte and Atlanta opened the races to frontstretch condominium owners, who could each offer five guests. To reduce on-track activity, all events are being held without qualifying or practice sessions (excluding the Coca-Cola 600, which used same-day qualifying, and the Pennzoil 150 Xfinity race, which had Friday practice as the Indianapolis Motor Speedway moved the event to the road course as part of an INDYCAR doubleheader), and starting order was initially determined by either a random draw, divided into segments of the owners' points standings as of that race, for single race meetings, and for the second race in the same meeting, the finishing order from the previous race with the top 20 inverted. Similar to rules used when rain cleaned the rubber off the circuit between the last session and the race, refueling of cars was prohibited until a predetermined safety car situation ("competition caution") at a specific lap (between lap 10 on road courses to lap 50 on short tracks) announced during the conference call that drivers, crew chiefs, and officials participated during the week that replaced the competitors' meeting held on race morning. Some Truck Series races did not use them because of their shorter lengths. The safety car situation was used in order to allow for extended adjustments of vehicles. If a safety car is called before the predetermined lap, refueling was still prohibited until the predetermined lap safety car, unless NASCAR determines they are within enough laps to allow for the rule to be cleared.

Starting in August with the Daytona road course round, NASCAR launched a new procedure based on performance. The new procedure is a three-pronged, weighted system formula taking into account the team owners' current place in the points standings, drivers' previous race finish, and drivers' fastest lap in the previous race. The driver with the lowest total number is awarded the pole, the second-lowest starts on the outside of the front row, and so on.

After four weeks, and six races had been conducted with only the Charlotte and Atlanta races having limited spectators in condominiums on the circuit, NASCAR announced on 9 June that invited guests will be admitted at the Dixie Vodka 400 in Homestead. Homestead featured 1,000 members of the U.S. military from the South Florida area (representing United States Southern Command and the Homestead Air Reserve Base). The GEICO 500 at Talladega was the first round to feature paid spectators, with a limit of 5,000 spectators combined in the grandstands and backstretch camping, featuring priority to local ticketholders. The ARCA Menards Series General Tire 200 and NASCAR Xfinity Series Unhinged 300 support races were the first to admit paying spectators, as backstretch campers were allowed to stage on track to watch all three races. NASCAR procedure would be only Cup Series races would have grandstands open, while support series races would have selected camping areas (initially outside the circuit overlooking the circuit, but later adjusted at some races to allow selected infield campgrounds) open.

On 3 July, Jimmie Johnson reported that he had tested positive for COVID-19 (the first NASCAR driver to do so), requiring him to use Justin Allgaier as a substitute driver for that weekend's Big Machine Hand Sanitizer 400. That turned out to be crucial, as Johnson, who had been scheduled to start sixth, would miss the playoff cut by six points. Johnson was asymptomatic, and was cleared on 8 July after two further tests came back negative. On 15 August, Austin Dillon became the second Cup Series driver to reveal a positive test, and as a result he missed the Daytona Grand Prix. Unlike Johnson, Dillon had already secured a playoff spot by winning the O'Reilly Auto Parts 500 at Texas the month before.

On 8 July, NASCAR announced the remaining schedule of races through the end of the regular season in late-August, including twin races at Dover International Speedway and Michigan International Speedway (both held on their regularly scheduled dates, but with a Saturday rescheduled race each) that would both be 500-kilometer races, and the race at Watkins Glen International being replaced by inaugural road course races at Daytona due to New York state travel restrictions. NASCAR stated that more upcoming races may be held with spectators on a case-by-case basis depending on local health orders, with Texas Motor Speedway (50% capacity for Cup only in grandstands, backstretch camping open for all races), New Hampshire Motor Speedway (19,000), and both Daytona races (about 20,000 for Cup only, some infield camping was allowed) planning to do so. Of these races, Kansas, Dover, and Michigan were held behind closed doors. The 2020 NASCAR All-Star Race was held at Bristol Motor Speedway on 15 July instead of in Charlotte so that it could host limited spectators. Twenty-two thousand spectators attended of a potential 30,000, or approximately 20% of the venue's total capacity of 162,000, seats available. It was the largest number of spectators at any U.S. sporting event since the beginning of pandemic restrictions.

On 6 August, NASCAR filled out the rest of its 2020 season. The schedule for the playoffs in the Cup Series saw no change in the order of races or the tracks on which they ran. With two races still to be made up because of previous cancellations, the Xfinity Series playoff opener was delayed one week, starting with the Alsco 300 at Las Vegas Motor Speedway. A second race was added at Talladega, the Ag-Pro 300, which was in the playoff. The truck series playoff schedule included the rescheduled INDYCAR weekend race at Texas Motor Speedway (Texas and INDYCAR agreed to remove all support races for that weekend, which was held on its regularly scheduled weekend) and a third race at Kansas Speedway. The first two races were to be at World Wide Technology Raceway at Gateway (which kept its date, like Texas part of the INDYCAR weekend and logistics made it part of the regular season) and Canadian Tire Motorsports Park (removed because of travel restrictions by the Canadian government; the same restrictions forced Canadian-based MLB, NBA, and MLS teams to move their games to the United States for the season and part of next season as well, along with all Canadian National Hockey League teams were put in one division for the 2021 season, as well as cancelling the INDYCAR race in Toronto) Changes to the regular season include a second Xfinity Series race at Richmond Raceway (had been originally removed for a Martinsville Speedway race) and the Truck Series returned to Darlington for the first time since 2011, while Richmond, which had originally been set for the cancelled April Cup meeting, was moved to the September race meeting.

During the playoffs, tickets were available for the races at Darlington (8,000 spectators; first meeting of two Cup races behind closed doors), Bristol (hosted about 20,000 spectators of possible 30,000 at non-championship meeting; first championship meeting behind closed doors), Charlotte (7,500 seats), Kansas (8,400 seats), Talladega (which hosted 5,000 in the June meeting), Texas (about 50% capacity, or 50,000 seats; hosted July meeting with spectators), Martinsville (1,000, first meeting was behind closed doors), and Phoenix (about 20% capacity, or 8,400 seats). The Richmond and Las Vegas races were behind closed doors; the first date at the latter track was held before the pandemic, and only began admitting spectators for the relocated NHRA World Finals at its drag strip from 30 October to 1 November. Bristol announced a legal sellout of its 30,000 available seats on 9 September, ten days before the scheduled race date. Charlotte also had oversold tickets and has a legal sellout. Initially, all support races were held behind closed doors, but Bristol and Charlotte allowed spectators for their Xfinity races, and Texas allowed spectators for the Truck race as it was the undercard on the same day as the Cup race. All support races permitted spectators by October, as Texas, Talladega, and Kansas allowed spectators in recreational vehicles parked in lots overlooking the track or some infield sections for camping access to races where grandstands were closed.

==== 2021 season ====
NASCAR announced the 2021 Cup Series schedule on 30 September, the 2021 Xfinity Series schedule on 30 October, and the 2021 Camping World Truck series schedule on 19 November. Some of its race dates were originally introduced during the pandemic, specifically the spring meeting at Darlington for all three top series. The Talladega playoff race was added for the second consecutive year for the Xfinity Series (it was removed at the end of the 2022 season, but returned in 2024). Also, NASCAR kept pandemic restrictions in place by announcing only eight weekends would feature a full slate of practice and qualifying, which were the Daytona 500, Coca-Cola 600, the five weekends on new circuits or changed layouts (the March Bristol meeting, on dirt, Austin, Nashville, Road America, Indianapolis on the road course), and the November Phoenix championship round. All other meetings would use the pandemic format of no practice or qualifying with grids set by the competition formula implemented starting with the first August Daytona round. When the Bristol spring meeting qualifying was cancelled, NASCAR used the competition formula to determine the starting order, a permanent change from the traditional use of owner points.

The Daytona meeting carried a limit of about 30,000 of estimated 101,500 grandstand seats offered to spectators. On 8 December 2020, it was announced that Auto Club Speedway in California will not host a race for the Cup and Xfinity series in 2021 due to increasing California state restrictions, and will be replaced by the Daytona Grand Prix which will swap dates with the Homestead–Miami Speedway race for logistics reasons. All three national series will race at the Daytona Road Course, with the Truck Series race at Homestead replaced with the Daytona Road Course. The Cup race will expand from 235 miles to 400 km, while the Xfinity (300 km) and Truck (250 km) races will keep their distances from 2020.

By May, circuits began removing attendance restrictions. The 62nd Annual Coca-Cola 600 at Charlotte Motor Speedway will be the first circuit to allow a full allotment of spectators. Most circuits than announced grandstands would be fully open to spectators, with NASCAR announcing on 2 June 2021 the last of the circuits still restricted would be fully open, ending NASCAR's pandemic restrictions in grandstands.

On 15 May 2021, in the wake of INDYCAR and Formula One cancelling rounds in Canada, Fox Sports writer Bob Pockrass sent a Twitter message saying Camping World Truck Series teams were being prepared in case Canadian Tire Motorsport Park (Mosport), in Bowmanville, Ontario, would have to be cancelled because of Canadian restrictions. Teams are expecting the fall-back plan to have the replacement race as part of the Darlington Raceway Cook Out Southern 500 Cup Series Playoff round in September if that should happen. Darlington in 2020 held their Truck Series race during the afternoon of the Sunday evening race, and already has run the LiftKits4Less.com 200 in May there, which was part of the spring Throwback race weekend. On 25 May 2021, NASCAR formally announced the Mosport race would move to Darlington.

==== 2022 season ====
For 2022, NASCAR returned to regular practice and qualifying sessions, with practice and qualifying groups determined by the metric introduced in 2020 as teams are assigned odd and even based on the metric score. If qualifying cannot be held for any reason, the qualifying metric will replace the traditional owner points-based system.

=== IMSA WeatherTech SportsCar Championship ===
On 12 March 2020, IMSA announced the postponement of the 12 Hours of Sebring after a travel ban was imposed, which also cancelled the FIA World Endurance Championship 1000 miles or 8 Hours race to 11–14 November 2020, making it the final race of the season.

Form 18–24 March, IMSA announced the postponement of Mid-Ohio to 25–27 September, cancellation of the Long Beach round when the INDYCAR meeting was cancelled, moving up Laguna Seca to 4–6 September, and Michelin Raceway to 14–17 October. The Laguna Seca date change was designed to allow teams in LMP2 or GTLM to attend the 2020 24 Hours of Le Mans, which teams later declined.

On 15 May, after NASCAR's announcement of their national series resumption, IMSA announced a plan to resume their series. The Paul Revere 250 sportscar race at Daytona would be reinstated, while a second standard-distance three-hour meeting would be added in Sebring on consecutive weeks, with Daytona on 4 July and Sebring on 11 July. IMSA originally announced the events would be held behind closed doors, but following the success of NASCAR organising events with spectators in June, opened both Florida races to paid spectators.

On 25 June, IMSA announced the 6 Hours of Watkins Glen was set for 3–6 September, the Lime Rock Park round was set for 11–12 September, and the Laguna Seca round moved to 30 October 10 1 November.

As NASCAR was forced to cancel its Watkins Glen round because of quarantine restrictions in New York state, IMSA announced likewise on 1 August that both the Watkins Glen and Lime Rock rounds would move to the Southeast. The 6 Hours was moved to Michelin Raceway in September, while the Northeast Grand Prix was moved to Charlotte Motor Speedway, which the circuit had not raced since the 1980s, to be held during the NASCAR Bank of America 400 weekend.

IMSA was hit again in 2021 by more related changes. On April 7, 2021, the Canadian Tire Motorsports Park round was cancelled and shifted to Watkins Glen where the 6 Hours of The Glen would be featured with a standard round at Watkins Glen.

== Rally raid ==
The 2020 FIM Cross-Country Rallies World Championship season was cancelled.

The 2021 Africa Eco Race was cancelled due to health risks associated with the COVID-19 pandemic.

== TCR Touring Car Racing ==
Almost all TCR championships have been affected by the outbreak, resulting in complete calendar changes, race postponements and cancellations. These include: TCR Australia, TCR Asia Pacific Cup, TCR Germany, TCR UK, TCR Japan, TCR Italy, TCR Scandinavia, TCR Denmark, TCR Asia, TCR China, TCR Europe, and TC America.

== World Endurance Championship ==
The 1000 Miles of Sebring race was canceled because of travel restrictions. The 6 Hours of Spa-Francorchamps and the 24 Hours of Le Mans were both postponed. Both races were rescheduled to 13–14 August and 19–20 September respectively. For the first time in the event's history, the 24 Hours of Le Mans was held without spectators. Not only rescheduled races, the next season's of the championship in 2021 will back to annual calendar as an effects of the pandemic.

== World Rally Championship ==
2020 season

The 2020 running of Rally Argentina, Rally Italia Sardegna and Rally de Portugal were postponed, with Portugal later announced to be cancelled. The Safari Rally in Kenya, Rally Finland, Wales Rally GB and Rally New Zealand were also cancelled. The 2020 Rally Mexico was shortened to allow competitors time to pack their equipment up and return to their headquarters in Europe before a series of travel bans were implemented. The World Rally Championship-2, World Rally Championship-3 and Junior World Rally Championship support categories were also affected by the postponements.

On 2 July a revised calendar was issued, with the addition of a new event in Estonia and Rally Argentina being cancelled. On 19 August it was announced that the Ypres Rally of Belgium would replace Rally Japan, which that rally was cancelled because of international travel restrictions from Japanese government. But the event has been cancelled on 30 October due to evolution of the virus cases in Belgium.

Rallye Deutschland, which was scheduled on 15–18 October, was cancelled due to extension of the large event gatherings ban until at least 31 October on late August. This cancellation led the Italian round to be rescheduled in order to avoid clash with Emilia-Romagna Grand Prix, which was scheduled for 31 October-1 November. The cancellation marked the first time since 2009 that the Rally Deutschland will not held.

On 9 October, Rally Monza made WRC debut for the first time on 4–6 December to become season finale.

2021 season

On 15 December 2020, Rally Sweden, which was scheduled for 11–14 February, was cancelled due to rising virus cases in Sweden. The cancellation marked the first time since 2009 that the Rally Sweden will not held. The rally was later replaced by Arctic Rally to ensure that a winter rally was included on the calendar.

On 26 March, Rally Chile, which was scheduled for 9–12 September, was cancelled due to travel restrictions in Chile as an effects of the pandemic. The rally was later replaced by Acropolis Rally in Greece, which last held in 2013.

On 7 September, Rally Japan, which was scheduled for the season finale on 11–14 November, was cancelled due to travel restrictions and state of emergency declaration by Japanese government. The rally was later replaced by Rally Monza and become season finale for the second consecutive year.

== World Rallycross Championship ==
The opening rounds of the 2020 FIA World Rallycross Championship in Barcelona and Portugal were postponed. The calendar of the World RX is rescheduled on May and started on 22–23 August at Sweden. The rescheduled calendar has removed Norway, Portugal, France, Benelux, Germany, Abu Dhabi, and South Africa, which that rounds has been cancelled due to evolution of the virus cases involving European countries and travel restrictions involving Abu Dhabi and South Africa. The rescheduled calendar also returning the Finland round, which last held in 2014 season to replace French round.

== World Touring Car Cup ==
The opening rounds of the 2020 World Touring Car Cup in Hungary and Germany were postponed. The four races that would have been held across the two rounds were rescheduled to 17–18 October and 24–25 September respectively.

== Motorcycle road racing ==
The 2020 Isle of Man TT and Scottish Six Days Trial were cancelled. The 2020 North West 200 event was postponed and subsequently cancelled.

== British national-level championships ==
All British motorsport, including the British Touring Car Championship, the British GT Championship, and the Britcar Endurance and Trophy Championships. were postponed until July 2020. One of the national level championship that has been cancelled was British Rally Championship. The event has been cancelled despite only one event held. This was the third cancellation of the history and the second cancellation for the same reason by epidemic since 2001.

== Monster trucks ==
Monster Jam events in multiple localities were affected. Shows in Austin, Texas, Baton Rouge, Louisiana, Cincinnati, Ohio, Detroit, Michigan, Grand Rapids, Michigan, and Hidalgo, Texas were postponed; and shows in Albuquerque, New Mexico, Columbus, Ohio, Colorado Springs, Colorado, Denver, Colorado, Columbia, South Carolina, Des Moines, Iowa, Evansville, Indiana, Green Bay, Wisconsin, Hamilton, Ontario, Huntsville, Alabama, Kansas City, Missouri, and Vancouver were cancelled. On 27 March 2020, World Finals XXI, scheduled to take place 2–3 May 2020, was canceled.

Hot Wheels Monster Trucks Live postponed a show in Louisville, Kentucky.

Monster X Tour postponed its World Finals event in Honolulu, Hawaii.

== Radio-controlled racing ==
Despite taking place in the second half of the year, all 4 blocks (representing Asia (FEMCA), North America (ROAR), Europe (EFRA) and the rest of the world (FAMAR)) and the IFMAR committee have agreed to postpone all remaining IFMAR World Championships (1:10 Electric Touring Car in Heemstede, Netherlands); 1:8 IC Off-Road in Cianorte, Brasil and 1:10 IC Touring Car in Brisbane, Australia) to an alternative date, possibly early 2021. This was the first postponement since 2001 when the events of the September 11 attacks caused the 1:10 Electric Off-Road Worlds to be moved to May the following year.

== 12 O'Clock Boyz Motocross Event ==
The 12 O'Clock Boyz Motocross Event set for 2020 will not take place. The 12 O'Clock Boyz Sports Company was forced to make this decision due to the COVID-19 pandemic.
