= 2019 NHRA Mello Yello Drag Racing Series =

2019 NHRA Mello Yello Drag Racing Series season
- League: NHRA
- Sport: Drag racing
- Champions: Steve Torrence (TF); Robert Hight (FC); Erica Enders-Stevens (PS); Andrew Hines (PSM)

NHRA seasons
- ← 2018 2020 →

The 2019 NHRA Mello Yello Drag Racing Season was announced on July 25, 2018.

It was the 64th season of the National Hot Rod Association's top drag racing competition. There were 24 Top Fuel and Funny Car events, 22 Pro Stock events (18 Championship NHRA Formula and 4 Non-Championship Mountain Motor Formula), and 16 Pro Stock Motorcycle events.

== Schedule ==
2019 NHRA Mello Yello Drag Racing Series Schedule
Date	Race	Site	TV	Winners			
Date	Race	Site	TV	Top Fuel	Funny Car	Pro Stock	PS Motorcycle
Feb 7–11 (Note: Due to inclement weather throughout the day, Final Elimination Rounds at the Lucas Oil NHRA Winternationals in Pomona, California were postponed until 10 AM PST on February 11, 2019. The first round of eliminations were underway until rain suspended any additional racing.)	Lucas Oil NHRA Winternationals presented by ProtectTheHarvest.com	Pomona, CA	FS1*	Doug Kalitta (1)	Robert Hight (1)	Bo Butner (1)	N/A
Feb 22–24	MagicDry Organic Absorbent NHRA Arizona Nationals	Chandler, AZ	FS1*	Billy Torrence (1)	Matt Hagan (1)	Jeg Coughlin, Jr. (1)	N/A
Mar 14–17	50th Amalie Motor Oil NHRA Gatornationals	Gainesville, FL	FS1*	Richie Crampton (1)	Robert Hight (2)	Bo Butner (2)	Andrew Hines (1)
Apr 5–7	DENSO Auto Parts NHRA Four-Wide Nationals ^{4 Lanes}	Las Vegas, NV	FS1*	Mike Salinas (1)	J.R. Todd (1)	Bo Butner (3)	Hector Arana, Jr. (1)
Apr 12–14	Mopar Express Lane NHRA SpringNationals presented by Pennzoil	Baytown, TX	Fox	Brittany Force (1)	Robert Hight (3)	John DeFlorian ^{MM}	N/A
Apr 26–28	NGK Spark Plugs NHRA Four-Wide Nationals ^{4 Lanes}	Concord, NC	FS1*	Steve Torrence (1)	Shawn Langdon (1)	Christopher Powers ^{MM}	Andrew Hines (2)
May 3–5	Arby's NHRA Southern Nationals	Commerce, GA	FS1*	Steve Torrence (2)	Ron Capps (1)	N/A	Andrew Hines (3)
May 17–19	Virginia NHRA Nationals	Petersburg, VA	FS1*	Steve Torrence (3)	Ron Capps (2)	Bo Butner (4)	Andrew Hines (4)
May 30 – Jun 2	Route 66 NHRA Nationals	Joliet, IL	FS1*	Steve Torrence (4)	Tommy Johnson, Jr. (1)	Deric Kramer (1)	Matt Smith (1)
Jun 7–9	Menards NHRA Heartland Nationals presented by Minties	Topeka, KS	FS1	Steve Torrence (5)	Robert Hight (4)	N/A	N/A
Jun 14–16	NHRA Thunder Valley Nationals	Bristol, TN	FS1	Mike Salinas (2)	Bob Tasca III (1)	Todd Hoerner ^{MM}	N/A
Jun 20–23	Summit Racing Equipment NHRA Nationals	Norwalk, OH	FS1*	Steve Torrence (6)	Bob Tasca III (2)	Chris McGaha (1)	Andrew Hines (5)
Jul 5–7	NHRA New England Nationals	Epping, NH	FS1	Steve Torrence (7)	Matt Hagan (2)	John DeFlorian (2) ^{MM}	N/A
Jul 19–21	Dodge Mile-High NHRA Nationals presented by Pennzoil	Morrison, CO	Fox	Steve Torrence (8)	Tommy Johnson, Jr. (2)	Greg Anderson (1)	Andrew Hines (6)
Jul 26–28	NHRA Sonoma Nationals	Sonoma, CA	Fox	Billy Torrence (2)	Robert Hight (5)	Greg Anderson (2)	Andrew Hines (7)
Aug 2–4	MagicDry Organic Absorbent NHRA Northwest Nationals	Kent, WA	Fox	Austin Prock (1)	John Force (1)	Matt Hartford (1)	N/A
Aug 15–18	Lucas Oil NHRA Nationals presented by General Tire	Brainerd, MN	FS1	Leah Pritchett (1)	Ron Capps (3)	Jason Line (1)	N/A
Aug 28 – Sep 2	Chevrolet Performance U.S. Nationals ^{1.5}	Brownsburg, IN	Fox	Doug Kalitta (2)	John Force (2)	Alex Laughlin (1)	Jerry Savoie (1)
Countdown to the Championship
Sep 12–15	Mopar Express Lane NHRA Nationals presented by Pennzoil	Mohnton, PA	FS1	Richie Crampton (2)	Jack Beckman (1)	Jason Line (2)	Jerry Savoie (2)
Sep 27–29	AAA Insurance NHRA Midwest Nationals	Madison, IL	FS1	Billy Torrence (3)	Shawn Langdon (2)	Erica Enders-Stevens (1)	Karen Stoffer (1)
Oct 11–14 (Note: Final Elimination Rounds at the NTK NHRA Carolina Nationals in Concord, North Carolina were postponed until 9 AM EDT on October 14, 2019 due to inclement weather.)	NTK NHRA Carolina Nationals	Concord, NC	FS1*	Steve Torrence (9)	Robert Hight (6)	Deric Kramer (2)	Andrew Hines (8)
Oct 17–20	AAA Texas NHRA FallNationals	Ennis, TX	FS1*	Billy Torrence (4)	Matt Hagan (3)	Greg Anderson (3)	Jerry Savoie (3)
Oct 31 – Nov 3	Dodge NHRA Nationals presented by Pennzoil	Las Vegas, NV	FS1	Brittany Force (2)	Matt Hagan (4)	Erica Enders-Stevens (2)	Matt Smith (2)
Nov 14–17	Auto Club NHRA Finals ^{1.5}	Pomona, CA	FS1	Doug Kalitta (3)	Jack Beckman (2)	Jeg Coughlin, Jr. (2)	Jianna Salinas (1)

* Finals televised on tape delay.

MM Pro Stock Car at this event is a non-championship race featuring the Mountain Motor formula, which has no engine displacement limit, can use carburetors or electronic fuel injection, and weighs a minimum of 2,450 pounds, compared to the NHRA Pro Stock formula that features electronic fuel injection, a 500ci (8193cc) engine displacement limit, and 2,350 pounds weight. All two-lane Mountain Motor races (except Charlotte) will feature eight-car fields. The four-lane Charlotte round will feature a full 16-car field.

=== Additional Rules for Specially Marked Races ===
4 Lanes: The Four-Wide Nationals in both Las Vegas and Charlotte in the spring will compete with cars on four lanes.

- All cars will qualify on each lane as all four lanes will be used in qualifying.
- Three rounds with cars using all four lanes.
- In Rounds One and Two, the top two drivers (of four) will advance to the next round.
- The pairings are set as follows:
  - Race One: 1, 8, 9, 16
  - Race Two: 4, 5, 12, 13
  - Race Three: 2, 7, 10, 15
  - Race Four: 3, 6, 11, 14
  - Semifinal One: Top two in Race One and Race Two
  - Semifinal Two: Top two in Race Three and Race Four
  - Finals: Top two in Semifinal One and Semifinal Two
- Lane choice determined by times in previous round. In first round, lane choice determined by fastest times.
- Drivers who advance in Rounds One and Two will receive 20 points for each round advancement.
- In Round Three, the winner of the race will be declared the race winner and will collect 40 points. The runner-up will receive 20 points. Third and fourth place drivers will be credited as semifinal losers.

1.5: The U. S. Nationals and Auto Club Finals will have their race points increased by 50% . Drivers who qualify but are eliminated in the first round receive 30 points, and each round win is worth 30 points. The top four receive 10, 9, 8, and 7 points, respectively, for qualifying positions, with the 5–6 drivers receiving 6 points, 7–8 drivers receiving 5 points, 9–12 receiving 4 points, and 13–16 receiving 3 points. Also, the top four, not three, drivers after each session receive points for fastest times in each round (4-3-2-1).

MM: Pro Stock Car at this event is a non-championship race with the Mountain Motor formula.

=== Event changes ===
The race events in Topeka, Kansas and Petersburg, Virginia have switched dates for this year, with the Virginia NHRA Nationals taking place in May and the Menards NHRA Heartland Nationals in June. In the Countdown, the race events in Charlotte, North Carolina and Ennis, Texas have switched weekends for this year in October. All other events during this season remain on the same schedule, although a couple of them either moved up or down a weekend. Scheduling changes made primarily to avoid NASCAR events in the markets.

NHRA Pro Stock Car only raced in 18 events this year, down from 24 events the year prior. Four of the races that they did not participate in featured non-championship exhibition Mountain Motor Pro Stock Cars (over-500 ci engines with carburetors). Those races are Houston, Charlotte 1, Bristol and Epping.

== Final standings ==
Top Fuel
Pos.	Driver	Points	Points Back	Chassis
1	Steve Torrence	2607	–	MLR
2	Doug Kalitta	2604	−3	Kalitta
3	Brittany Force	2555	−52	Force
4	Leah Pritchett	2474	−133	DSR (MG)
5	Billy Torrence	2458	−149	MLR
6	Richie Crampton	2399	−208	Kalitta
7	Mike Salinas	2381	−226	Scrappers
8	Austin Prock	2379	−228	Force
9	Antron Brown	2329	−278	DSR (MG)
10	Clay Millican	2300	−307	Hadman

Funny Car
Pos.	Driver	Points	Points Back	Make
1	Robert Hight	2637	–	Chevrolet
2	Jack Beckman	2629	−8	Dodge
3	Matt Hagan	2563	−74	Dodge
4	John Force	2471	−166	Chevrolet
5	Bob Tasca III	2446	−191	Ford
6	Ron Capps	2414	−223	Dodge
7	J.R. Todd	2391	−246	Toyota
8	Tommy Johnson, Jr.	2360	−277	Dodge
9	Shawn Langdon	2358	−279	Toyota
10	Tim Wilkerson	2283	−354	Ford

Pro Stock
Pos.	Driver	Points	Points Back	Make
1	Erica Enders-Stevens	2635	–	Chevrolet
2	Jeg Coughlin, Jr.	2614	−21	Chevrolet
3	Bo Butner	2524	−111	Chevrolet
4	Jason Line	2495	−140	Chevrolet
5	Matt Hartford	2448	−187	Chevrolet
6	Deric Kramer	2409	−226	Chevrolet
7	Greg Anderson	2408	−227	Chevrolet
8	Alex Laughlin	2345	−290	Chevrolet
9	Chris McGaha	2329	−306	Chevrolet
10	Val Smeland	2203	−432	Chevrolet

Pro Stock Motorcycle
Pos.	Driver	Points	Points Back	Make
1	Andrew Hines	2599	–	Harley-Davidson
2	Gerald Savoie	2573	−26	Suzuki
3	Matt Smith	2553	−46	Buell
4	Karen Stoffer	2534	−65	Suzuki
5	Eddie Krawiec	2474	−125	Harley-Davidson
6	Hector Arana, Jr.	2389	−210	Buell
7	Angelle Sampey	2381	−218	Harley-Davidson
8	Angie Smith	2281	−318	Buell
9	Ryan Oehler	2271	−328	Buell
10	Hector Arana	2209	−390	Buell
