= 2020 NHRA Drag Racing Series =

2020 NHRA Camping World Drag Racing Series season
- League: NHRA
- Sport: Drag racing
- Champions: Steve Torrence (TF); Matt Hagan (FC); Erica Enders-Stevens (PS); Matt Smith (PSM)

NHRA seasons
- ← 2019 2021 →

The 2020 NHRA Drag Racing Series was announced on May 14, 2019.

It was the 65th season of the National Hot Rod Association's top drag racing competition, and was scheduled for 24 races.

The season began under the title sponsorship of The Coca-Cola Company, as it had been since 2002. Coca-Cola's Mello Yello brand was once again promoted, as it had been for the previous few years. However, in September 2020 Coca-Cola, which had withheld a sponsorship payment during the NHRA shutdown, announced that it was ending its sponsorship of the series immediately. Since the agreement between the two sides was to run into 2023, the NHRA filed a lawsuit against Coca-Cola.

On October 4, 2020, the NHRA and Camping World CEO Marcus Lemonis announced the two sides had struck a deal for Camping World to immediately assume title sponsorship of the NHRA's top series. This marks the second motorsport series for which Camping World serves as title sponsor, after the NASCAR Camping World Truck Series.

Longtime Top Fuel competitor Chris Karamesines would retire from driving at the end of season, after a 63 year long career driving; his granddaughter Krista Baldwin took over driving.

== Pandemic Impact on Schedule ==
Originally scheduled for 24 races, the first Pomona and the Arizona rounds have been completed. The onset of the COVID-19 pandemic along with the Rudy Gobert incident and the abandonment of The Players Championship FedEx Cup PGA Tour event midway through the first round, led to the NHRA postponing the Gatornationals and revising the schedule.

On March 25, the NHRA announced the Countdown playoff had been cancelled because of the compressed schedule. They originally eliminated five races—Atlanta, Richmond, Epping, the first Las Vegas race, and the second Charlotte race while slotting the April Charlotte race into September, and reduced the schedule to 19 races (including the two that had been held) while intending to resume on June 5 with the resumption of the Gatornationals, followed by the SpringNationals in Baytown, Texas.

On May 4, the NHRA announced they were still working with authorities in various states and postponed more races. While removing one race from the plan, they intended to hold 16 more events in 2020 with an intent of starting in August with spectators. This was announced shortly after NASCAR announced a series of races behind closed doors to resume.

On June 3, the NHRA announced a new revised schedule, with races in Sonoma, Joliet, and Norwalk also cancelled, while returning Commerce to late August. The NHRA intended to restart July 11 at Lucas Oil Raceway, with spectators permitted, with two Lucas Oil Raceway rounds to restart the season.

On June 25, the King County, Washington authorities cancelled the round at Pacific Raceways in Kent, Washington, as they would have only permitted the event to run behind closed doors. The event would not be held in 2021 either.

All races scheduled to start July 9 were held with only two rounds of qualifying, except Lucas Oil Raceway 4 which held three qualifying rounds for Top Fuel and Funny Car drivers who advanced to the final of the postponed Lucas Oil Raceway 2 event. Ennis held four qualifying rounds for Pro Stock Car and Motorcycle participants who advanced to the semifinal of the postponed Madison, IL event.

After the NHRA season resumed July 11, the NHRA announced on July 17, during the middle of the second Lucas Oil Raceway round, that the Bandimere Speedway round in Colorado and Brainerd International Raceway round in Minnesota had originally been postponed, but later cancelled. The NHRA replaced all three cancelled rounds with a third consecutive round at Lucas Oil Raceway on August 6–9. The NHRA in August would then lose the Topeka, Commerce, and Maple Grove Raceway rounds to authorities.

On September 2, 2020, the NHRA released the final schedule where after the fourth consecutive round at Lucas Oil Raceway, the NHRA U.S. Nationals, the remainder of the schedule. Only two races originally on the schedule for that time of the year were held, in Madison, IL at World Wide Technology Raceway and in Ennis, TX at the Texas Motorplex. The rescheduled Gatornationals in Gainesville were scheduled in September and the rescheduled Mopar Express Lane SpringNationals in Baytown, TX in late October. While the NHRA announced the season would conclude in Las Vegas, they cancelled the scheduled Las Vegas round and moved the NHRA Finals, originally set for Pomona, into its place at Las Vegas (the Las Vegas round was officially the Dodge NHRA Finals).

Eleven Top Fuel and Funny Car events, ten NHRA Formula Pro Stock events (with three Non-Championship Mountain Motor Formula events), and ten Pro Stock Motorcycle events were conducted during the season.

== Schedule ==
Schedule released originally on June 2, 2019, but the finalised schedule was released September 2, 2020.

2020 NHRA Camping World Drag Racing Series Schedule
Date	Race	Site	TV	Winners			
Date	Race	Site	TV	Top Fuel	Funny Car	Pro Stock	PS Motorcycle
Feb 6–9	60th Lucas Oil NHRA Winternationals presented by ProtectTheHarvest.com	Pomona, CA	FS1*	Doug Kalitta (1)	Jack Beckman (1)	Jeg Coughlin, Jr. (1)	N/A
Feb 21–23	NHRA Arizona Nationals	Chandler, AZ	FS1*	Steve Torrence (1)	Tommy Johnson, Jr. (1)	Erica Enders (1)	N/A
July 11–12	E3 Spark Plug NHRA Nationals	Brownsburg, IN	Fox	Billy Torrence (1)	Matt Hagan (1)	Jason Line (1)	Ryan Oehler (1)
July 18–19 (Note: The final rounds of the event were postposed due to rain and completed at the 2020 U.S. Nationals event.)	Lucas Oil NHRA Summernationals at Indianapolis	Brownsburg, IN	Fox	Justin Ashley (1)	Matt Hagan (2)	N/A	N/A
Aug 7-9	Dodge NHRA Indy Nationals presented by Pennzoil	Brownsburg, IN	Fox	Steve Torrence (2)	Ron Capps (1)	Jeg Coughlin Jr (2)	Angelle Sampey (1)
Sep 3-6	Denso Spark Plugs NHRA U.S. Nationals	Brownsburg, IN	Fox	Shawn Langdon (1)	Jack Beckman (2)	Erica Enders (2)	Scotty Pollacheck (1)
Sep 26-27	Amalie Motor Oil NHRA Gatornationals	Gainesville, FL	FS1	Steve Torrence (3)	Ron Capps (2)	Alex Laughlin (1)	Matt Smith (1)
Oct 2–4 (Note: The final two rounds of Pro Stock and Pro Stock Motorcycle were postposed due to rain and completed at the AAA Texas NHRA FallNationals in Ennis.)	AAA Insurance NHRA Midwest Nationals	Madison, IL	FS1*	Doug Kalitta (2)	Tommy Johnson, Jr. (2)	Erica Enders (3)	Matt Smith (2)
Oct 15–18	AAA Texas NHRA FallNationals	Ennis, TX	FS1	Steve Torrence (4)	Jack Beckman (3)	Matt Hartford (1)	Jerry Savoie (1)
Oct 23-25	Mopar Express Lane NHRA SpringNationals presented by Pennzoil	Baytown, TX	FS1*	Tony Schumacher (1)	Tommy Johnson Jr. (3)	Aaron Stanfield (1)	Eddie Krawiec (1)
Oct 29 – Nov 1	Dodge NHRA Finals presented by Pennzoil	Las Vegas, NV	FS1	Antron Brown (1)	Matt Hagan (3)	Erica Enders (4)	Angie Smith (1)
* Finals televised on tape delay.

== Removed and merged events ==
The NHRA removed three races from and merged two races from the original NHRA schedule when the season was suspended during the Gainesville Raceway event as a result of the COVID-19 pandemic. These events include the following:

=== Merged ===
Two venues with two events each had their schedules reduced to one race.

- Las Vegas Motor Speedway: April 3–5 and October 29-November 1. Both dates officially cancelled. The fall date is now home of the relocated Pomona race with those rules in effect as the NHRA World Finals.
- Auto Club Raceway at Pomona: February 6–9 and November 13–15. Only the Winternationals was held. World Finals moved to Las Vegas, which replaced both races with the World Finals.

=== Cancelled ===
Thirteen venues lost their NHRA Mello Yello Drag Racing Series events entirely during the 2020 season as a result of the COVID-19 pandemic. Dates listed in original order.

- zMax Dragway: April 24–26 and September 25–27.
- Atlanta Dragway: May 15–17
- Virginia Motorsports Park: May 29–31 (Track closed by government)
- Heartland Motorsports Park: June 12–14
- Bristol Motor Speedway: June 19–21 (Logistics)
- Summit Motorsports Park: June 25–28 (Track closed by management because of government regulations)
- Route 66 Raceway: July 10–12 (Track closed by government)
- Bandimere Speedway: July 17–19 (Track closed by government)
- Sonoma Raceway: July 24–26 (Track closed by government)
- Pacific Raceways: July 31-August 2 (Track closed by government)
- Brainerd International Raceway: August 14–16
- New England Dragway: August 21–23
- Maple Grove Raceway: September 11–13

=== Event changes ===
Races in Charlotte and St. Louis have switched weekends for this year. Scheduling changes made primarily to avoid NASCAR events in some markets.

The only race that does not feature Pro Stock Car will be Indianapolis 2. Last year, Atlanta did not feature either Pro Stock formula. The three rounds that will feature Mountain Motor but not the NHRA Pro Stock class are Denver, Brainerd and Atlanta. St. Louis will feature both NHRA Formula and Mountain Motor.

The NHRA also cancelled the Countdown format owing to the fewer races in 2020.

== Final standings ==
Top Fuel
Pos.	Driver	Points	Points Back	Chassis
1	Steve Torrence	1015	–	MLR
2	Doug Kalitta	822	−193	Kalitta
3	Billy Torrence	793	−222	MLR
4	Leah Pritchett	754	−261	DSR (MG)
5	Antron Brown	709	−306	DSR (MG)
6	Shawn Langdon	595	−420	Kalitta
7	Justin Ashley	594	−421	Hadman
8	Clay Millican	493	−522	Hadman
9	Tony Schumacher	446	−551	DSR (MG)
10	Terry McMillen	436	−579	Hadman

Funny Car
Pos.	Driver	Points	Points Back	Make
1	Matt Hagan	1020	−	Dodge
2	Tommy Johnson, Jr.	915	−105	Dodge
3	Jack Beckman	848	−172	Dodge
4	Ron Capps	828	−192	Dodge
5	Bob Tasca III	679	−341	Ford
6	J.R. Todd	663	−357	Toyota
7	Tim Wilkerson	615	−405	Ford
8	Alexis Dejoria	605	−415	Toyota
9	Paul Lee	464	−556	Toyota
10	Cruz Pedregon	436	−584	Dodge

Pro Stock
Pos.	Driver	Points	Points Back	Make
1	Erica Enders-Stevens	922	–	Chevrolet
2	Jason Line	755	−167	Chevrolet
3	Jeg Coughlin, Jr.	747	−175	Chevrolet
4	Greg Anderson	693	−229	Chevrolet
5	Matt Hartford	628	−294	Chevrolet
6	Alex Laughlin	582	−340	Chevrolet
7	Aaron Stanfield	563	−359	Chevrolet
8	Chris McGaha	487	−435	Chevrolet
9	Bo Butner	477	−458	Chevrolet
10	Deric Kramer	458	−464	Chevrolet

Pro Stock Motorcycle
Pos.	Driver	Points	Points Back	Make
1	Matt Smith	703	–	Buell
2	Eddie Krawiec	593	−110	Harley-Davidson
3	Scotty Pollacheck	587	-116	Buell
4	Andrew Hines	576	-127	Harley-Davidson
5	Angie Smith	514	−189	Buell
6	Angelle Sampey	495	−208	Harley-Davidson
7	Ryan Oehler	448	−255	Buell
8	Steve Johnson	445	-258	Suzuki
9	Hector Arana, Jr.	434	−269	Buell
10	Gerald Savoie	323	−380	Suzuki
