= 2010 NHRA Full Throttle Drag Racing Series season =

- League: NHRA
- Sport: Drag racing
- Champions: Larry Dixon (TF); John Force (FC); Greg Anderson (PS); LE Tonglet (PSM)

NHRA seasons
- ← 2009 2011 →

The 2010 NHRA Full Throttle Drag Racing Season ran from February 11 to November 14, 2010. A variety of new safety rules were implemented following the conclusion of the investigation of the Scott Kalitta death in 2008. The NHRA had planned on returning Top Fuel and Funny Car classes to 1,320 ft (400 m) distances; however, racing in those classes remained at 1,000 ft (300 m) distance to contain costs with the United States economy still in recession, as well as to address ongoing safety concerns.

There were 23 Top Fuel, Funny Car, and Pro Stock car events, and 17 Pro Stock Motorcycle events.

== Schedule ==
With the closure of the Memphis Motorsports Park as of 30 October 2009, the Full Throttle Series is now slated for 23 events: The Virginia NHRA Nationals has also been eliminated, as Virginia Motorsports Park chose to align with rival Kenneth Feld's International Hot Rod Association instead (many tracks changed sanctioning, owing to their sportsman classes). A second race at zMax Dragway, the Four Wide Nationals, was added.

2010 NHRA Full Throttle Schedule
Date	Race	Site	Winners			
Date	Race	Site	Top Fuel Dragster	Funny Car	Pro Stock	PS Motorcycle
February 11–14	50th Kragen O'Reilly NHRA Winternationals	Pomona, California	Larry Dixon (1)	John Force (1)	Mike Edwards (1)	N/A
February 19–22 (Note: Pro Stock eliminations were postponed after the first round, the remaining rounds were conducted during Gainesville on Saturday.)	Lucas Oil Slick Mist NHRA Nationals	Chandler, Ariz.	Cory McClenathan (1)	Jack Beckman (1)	Mike Edwards (2)	N/A
March 11–14	Tire Kingdom Gatornationals	Gainesville, Fla	Tony Schumacher (1)	Tim Wilkerson (1)	Jason Line	Eddie Krawiec (1)
March 25–28	Four Wide Nationals ^{1}	Concord, NC	Cory McClenathan (2)	John Force (2)	Mike Edwards (3)	Matt Smith (1)
April 9–11	O'Reilly NHRA Spring Nationals	Houston, Texas	Larry Dixon (2)	Matt Hagan (1)	Jeg Coughlin (1)	Andrew Hines (1)
April 16–18	SummitRacing.com NHRA Nationals	Las Vegas, Nev.	Larry Dixon (3)	John Force (3)	Mike Edwards (4)	N/A
April 30 – May 2	AAA Insurance NHRA Midwest Nationals	Madison, Ill.	Tony Schumacher (2)	Robert Hight (1)	Warren Johnson	Michael Phillips (1)
May 14–16	Summit Racing Equipment NHRA Southern Nationals	Atlanta, Ga.	Larry Dixon (4)	Robert Hight (2)	Jeg Coughlin (2)	Andrew Hines (2)
May 21–23	O'Reilly NHRA Summernationals	Topeka, Kansas	Tony Schumacher (3)	Robert Hight (3)	Mike Edwards (5)	N/A
June 3–6	United Association Route 66 NHRA Nationals	Chicago, Ill.	Larry Dixon (5)	Matt Hagan (2)	Mike Edwards (6)	LE Tonglet (1)
June 10–13	United Association NHRA SuperNationals	Englishtown, N.J.	Larry Dixon (6)	Bob Tasca III (1)	Mike Edwards (7)	Michael Phillips (2)
June 18–20	NHRA Thunder Valley Nationals	Bristol, Tenn.	Tony Schumacher (4)	John Force (4)	Mike Edwards (8)	N/A
June 24–27	Summit Racing Equipment NHRA Nationals	Norwalk, Ohio	Larry Dixon (7)	Tim Wilkerson (2)	Greg Anderson (1)	Matt Smith (2)
July 9–11	NHRA Northwest Nationals	Seattle, Wash.	Cory McClenathan (3)	Tim Wilkerson (3)	Greg Anderson (2)	N/A
July 16–18	Fram Autolite NHRA Nationals	Sonoma, Calif.	Larry Dixon (8)	Ron Capps (1)	Jeg Coughlin (3)	Michael Phillips (3)
July 23–25	Mopar Mile-High NHRA Nationals	Denver, Colo.	Doug Kalitta (1)	Robert Hight (4)	Allen Johnson (1)	Andrew Hines (3)
August 12–15	Lucas Oil NHRA Nationals	Brainerd, Minn.	Larry Dixon (9)	Bob Bode (1)	Jeg Coughlin (4)	Andrew Hines (4)
2010 Countdown to the Championship
September 1–6	Mac Tools U.S. Nationals	Indianapolis, Ind.	Larry Dixon (10)	Ashley Force-Hood (1)	Greg Stanfield (1)	LE Tonglet (2)
September 16–19	O'Reilly Auto Parts NHRA Nationals	Concord, N.C.	Larry Dixon (11)	Cruz Pedregon (1)	Greg Anderson (3)	LE Tonglet (3)
September 23–26	O'Reilly Super Start Batteries NHRA Fall Nationals	Dallas, Texas	Tony Schumacher (5)	Matt Hagan (3)	Greg Anderson (4)	LE Tonglet (4)
October 7–10	Toyo Tires NHRA Nationals	Reading, Pa.	Larry Dixon (12)	Cruz Pedregon (2)	Dave Connolly (1)	Andrew Hines (5)
October 28–31	NHRA Las Vegas Nationals	Las Vegas, Nev.	Tony Schumacher (6)	John Force (5)	Greg Anderson (5)	LE Tonglet (5)
November 11–14	Automobile Club of Southern California NHRA Finals	Pomona, Calif.	Antron Brown (1)	John Force (6)	Shane Gray (1)	Eddie Krawiec (2)

^{1} The rules for the Four Wide Nationals differ from other races:

- All cars will qualify on each lane as all four lanes will be used in qualifying.
- Three rounds with cars using all four lanes.
- In Rounds One and Two, the top two drivers (of four) will advance to the next round.
- The pairings are set as follows:
  - Race One: 1, 8, 9, 16
  - Race Two: 4, 5, 12, 13
  - Race Three: 2, 7, 10, 15
  - Race Four: 3, 6, 11, 14
  - Semifinal One: Top two in Race One and Race Two
  - Semifinal Two: Top two in Race Three and Race Four
  - Finals: Top two in Semifinal One and Semifinal Two
- Lane choice determined by times in previous round. In first round, lane choice determined by fastest times.
- Drivers who advance in Rounds One and Two will receive 20 points for each round advancement.
- In Round Three, the winner of the race will be declared the race winner and will collect 40 points. The runner-up will receive 20 points. Third and fourth place drivers will be credited as semifinal losers.

== Point standings ==
Top Fuel
Position	Driver	Points	Points Back	Chassis
1	Larry Dixon	2684	–	Hadman
2	Tony Schumacher	2582	−102	Hadman
3	Cory McClenathan	2551	−133	
4	Antron Brown	2460	−224	Hadman
5	Shawn Langdon	2431	−253	Hadman
6	Doug Kalitta	2371	−313	Attac
7	Brandon Bernstein	2366	−318	McKinney
8	Steve Torrence	2289	−395	Hadman
9	Dave Grubnic	2288	−396	Attac
10	Morgan Lucas	2252	−432	Hadman

Funny Car
Position	Driver	Points	Points Back	Make
1	John Force	2621	–	Ford
2	Matt Hagan	2579	−42	Dodge
3	Ashley Force Hood	2449	−172	Ford
4	Jack Beckman	2349	−182	Dodge
5	Bob Tasca III	2395	−226	Ford
6	Del Worsham	2307	−314	Toyota
7	Ron Capps	2284	−337	Dodge
8	Robert Hight	2277	−344	Ford
9	Tony Pedregon	2251	−370	Chevrolet
10	Tim Wilkerson	2242	−379	Ford

Pro Stock
Position	Driver	Points	Points Back	Make
1	Greg Anderson	2591	–	Pontiac
2	Greg Stanfield	2479	−112	Pontiac
3	Mike Edwards	2469	−122	Pontiac
4	Shane Gray	2439	−152	Pontiac
5	Jason Line	2438	−153	Pontiac
6	Allen Johnson	2421	−170	Dodge
7	Jeg Coughlin Jr.	2395	−196	Chevrolet
8	Ron Krisher	2272	−319	Chevrolet
9	Rodger Brogdon	2245	−346	Pontiac
10	Johnny Gray	2200	−391	Pontiac

Pro Stock Motorcycle
Position	Driver	Points	Points Back	Make
1	LE Tonglet	2681	–	Suzuki
2	Andrew Hines	2677	−4	Harley-Davidson
3	Ed Krawiec	2559	−122	Harley-Davidson
4	Matt Smith	2450	−231	Zypher
5	Hector Arana	2442	−239	Buell
6	Steve Johnson	2332	−349	Suzuki
7	Michael Phillips	2327	−354	Suzuki
8	Karen Stoffer	2290	−391	Suzuki
9	Craig Treble	2215	−466	Suzuki
10	David Hope	2176	−505	Buell

== Notable events ==
After 47 years as a driver and owner, Don Prudhomme announced his retirement from the series.

Funny car driver Mike Neff stepped down as driver to become co-crew chief for John Force, the other crew chief is Austin Coil.

In the first round at Arizona, Antron Brown lost a wheel and crashed into the wall. Although Brown was uninjured in the accident, the wheel struck a female spectator who was killed. Because of weather conditions, the Pro Stock event at the same meet was cancelled after one round. The eight first-round winners competed as part of second-round qualifying at the next round.

Just two days after John Force won a record 15th Funny Car world championship, his crew chief, NHRA Hall of Fame member Austin Coil, resigned from John Force Racing. In his announcement, Coil stated he wanted to take at least a year off, but left the door open to a return to racing in 2012.
