= Greg Anderson =

Greg or Gregory Anderson may refer to:

- Cadillac Anderson (Gregory Wayne Anderson, born 1964), basketball player
- Greg Anderson (actor) (born 1961), Canadian actor
- Greg Anderson (drag racer) (born 1961), NHRA pro stock drag racer
- Greg Anderson (footballer) (born 1966), Australian rules footballer
- Greg Anderson (Kentucky politician) (born 1983), youngest elected official in Kentucky
- Greg Anderson (guitarist) (born 1970), member of many doom metal and stoner metal bands, including Sunn O))), Goatsnake, Lotus Eaters
- Greg Anderson (pianist) (born 1981), American concert pianist, composer, writer
- Greg Anderson (trainer) (born 1966), baseball trainer linked to Barry Bonds and BALCO
- Gregory Anderson (linguist), specialist in Munda and Turkic languages
- Greg Anderson (bishop) (born 1961), Australian Anglican Bishop of the Northern Territory
- Gregory K. Anderson, United States Army general

== See also ==
- Greg Andersen
