= Bo Butner =

American drag racer

- Nationality: American
- Born: June 10, 1974 (age 52) New Albany, Indiana, U.S.

NHRA Camping World Series career
- Current team: KB Racing; Jim Butner Auto Chevrolet Camaro Pro Stock Car
- Years active: 2015–present
- Car number: 8 (2019)
- Crew chief: Darrel Herron & Rob Downing
- Championships: 2 (1 PS, 1 CE)
- Wins: 26 (11 PS, 15 SP)
- Fastest laps: Best ET; 6.475 seconds 10/18/2015 at Ennis, TX; Best Speed; 214.28 MPH (344.85 km/h); 3/17/2017 at Gainesville, FL

Championship titles
- 2006 2017: 1 (Competition Eliminator); 1 (Pro Stock)
- Statistics up to date as of July 28, 2019.

James E. "Bo" Butner III (born June 10, 1974, in New Albany, Indiana) is an American drag racer, currently driving a Chevrolet Camaro Pro Stock Car for Elite motor sports in the NHRA Camping World Drag Racing Series. The Floyds Knobs, Indiana native made his Pro Stock debut in 2015 at the NHRA Southern Nationals in Commerce, Georgia after previously competing in the Sportsman categories of the NHRA Lucas Oil Drag Racing Series. His first career national event win on the professional level would come two years later on April 23, 2017, at the NHRA SpringNationals in Baytown, Texas, defeating Jeg Coughlin Jr. in the Pro Stock finals. Butner would win four more national events that year en route to his first world championship in Pro Stock. He also has a world championship from 2006 in Competition Eliminator as well as four NHRA Division 3 championships in the Sportsman categories.

Butner is currently CEO of Jim Butner Auto, Inc. of Clarksville, Indiana, a longtime family owned car dealership which is also the primary sponsor for his Pro Stock Car.
