= L. E. Tonglet =

American motorcycle racer

L.E. Tonglet is an NHRA Mello Yello Drag Racing Pro Stock Motorcycle racer. In the 2010 season, he won the Motorcycle season championship. That same year, Tonglet won the prestigious NHRA U.S. Nationals. Tonglet is currently a firefighter.
