= Summit Motorsports Park =

Dragstrip near Norwalk, Ohio

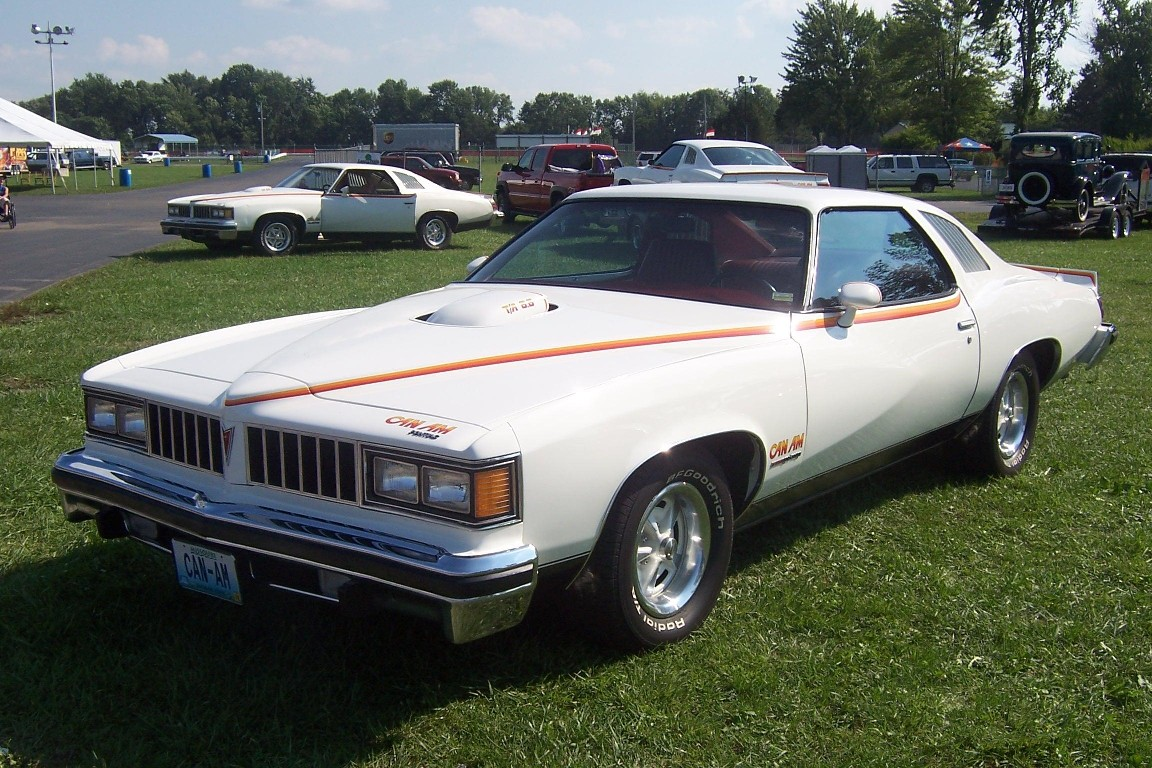
- A Pontiac Can Am at the 2007 Pontiac Nationals, held at the park
- Location: Norwalk, Ohio, United States
- Coordinates: 41°14′07″N 82°32′34″W
- Capacity: 40,000
- Owner: Bill Bader Jr
- Address: 1300 State Route 18
- Opened: 1963
- Former names: Norwalk Raceway Park
- Major events: NHRA Mission Foods Drag Racing Series; Summit Racing Equipment NHRA Nationals
- Website: www.summitmotorsportspark.com

Drag Strip
- Surface: Concrete
- Length: 0.250 mi (0.402 km)

Summit Motorsports Park, formerly known as Norwalk Raceway Park and Norwalk Dragway, is a drag racing facility located at 1300 State Route 18 near Norwalk, Ohio. It has been a National Hot Rod Association (NHRA) sanctioned facility since 2007 and annually hosts the Summit Racing Equipment NHRA Nationals an NHRA Mission Foods Drag Racing Series Event and the Cavalcade of Stars, an NHRA Lucas Oil Drag Racing Series Regional Event. The track is well known for their NHRA events but the facility holds regular local competition throughout each year as well.

== History ==
Norwalk Dragway opened to the public in 1963 but lay dormant for much of the first ten years of its existence. Goodyear briefly used the track for tire testing up to 1973 when the track was sold to a joint venture between Wayne Sergeant and Bill Bader. Sergeant pulled out of the deal the following year and then Bader continued as the sole owner. The track was then reopened on April 28, 1974.

In 1981, Norwalk hosted the International Hot Rod Association (IHRA) World Nationals for the first time. It continued to host this event up until the 2006 season and had become the IHRA's flagship drag racing facility by this time.

In 2007, Ohio-based automotive parts company Summit Racing Equipment purchased the naming rights to the facility. The Pontiac Performance NHRA Nationals, held at National Trail Raceway in Hebron, Ohio between 1972 and 2006, found its new home at Summit Motorsports Park in 2007. In preparation for the facility's NHRA debut, millions of dollars were spent in upgrades and renovations.

In 2008, the last NHRA national event to run the nitromethane classes to 1320' was held here. Since this race, nitromethane classes have only been contested to 1000' to allow for more braking distance at national events.

In 2020, track owner Bill Bader Jr. initially refused to shut down the track as a result of the COVID-19 pandemic. However, the track was eventually shuttered for the entire 2020 season by government authorities, with only one event held -- the Norwalk High School graduation ceremony.

== NHRA National Event Winners ==
Year	Top Fuel	Funny Car	Pro Stock	Pro Stock Motorcycle
2007	Tony Schumacher	Mike Ashley	Dave Connolly	Andrew Hines
2008	Doug Herbert	Tony Pedregon	Greg Anderson	Hector Arana
2009	Larry Dixon	Jack Beckman	Jason Line	Andrew Hines
2010	Larry Dixon	Tim Wilkerson	Greg Anderson	Matt Smith
2011	Del Worsham	Mike Neff	Vincent Nobile	Eddie Krawiec
2012	Spencer Massey	Mike Neff	Vincent Nobile	Andrew Hines
2013	Khalid alBalooshi	Johnny Gray	Mike Edwards	Matt Smith
2014	Antron Brown	John Force	Erica Enders-Stevens	Andrew Hines
2015	Doug Kalitta	Jack Beckman	Greg Anderson	Karen Stoffer
2016	Shawn Langdon	Ron Capps	Jason Line	Eddie Krawiec
2017	Steve Torrence	Jack Beckman	Bo Butner	L.E. Tonglet
2018	Blake Alexander	Matt Hagan	Tanner Gray	Eddie Krawiec
2019	Steve Torrence	Bob Tasca III	Chris McGaha	Andrew Hines
2020	Event	Cancelled	Because	COVID-19
2021	Steve Torrence	Cruz Pedregon	Erica Enders	Matt Smith
2022	Mike Salinas	Robert Hight	Erica Enders	Angelle Sampey
2023	Leah Pruett	Blake Alexander	Matt Hartford	Hector Arana Jr.
2024	Antron Brown	Bob Tasca III	Kenny Delco	Gaige Herrera
2025	Justin Ashley	Austin Prock	Cory Reed	John Hall
2026	Maddi Gordon	Ron Capps	Aaron Stanfield	Richard Gadson

== Current NHRA Track Records ==
Category	E.T.	Speed	Driver	Event	Ref
Top Fuel	3.666		Brittany Force	2022 Summit Racing Equipment NHRA Nationals	
Top Fuel		339.79 mph (546.84 km/h)	Maddi Gordon	2026 Summit Racing Equipment NHRA Nationals	
Funny Car	3.853		Austin Prock	2024 Summit Racing Equipment NHRA Nationals	
Funny Car		337.41 mph (543.01 km/h)	Austin Prock	2026 Summit Racing Equipment NHRA Nationals	
Pro Stock	6.523		Erica Enders	2014 Summit Racing Equipment NHRA Nationals	
Pro Stock		212.63 mph (342.19 km/h)	Erica Enders	2014 Summit Racing Equipment NHRA Nationals	
Pro Stock Motorcycle	6.627		Gaige Herrera	2024 Summit Racing Equipment NHRA Nationals	
Pro Stock Motorcycle		201.58 mph (324.41 km/h)	Matt Smith	2021 Summit Racing Equipment NHRA Nationals	
