= In-N-Out Burger Pomona Dragstrip =

Raciling facility in California, US

"Pomona Raceway"
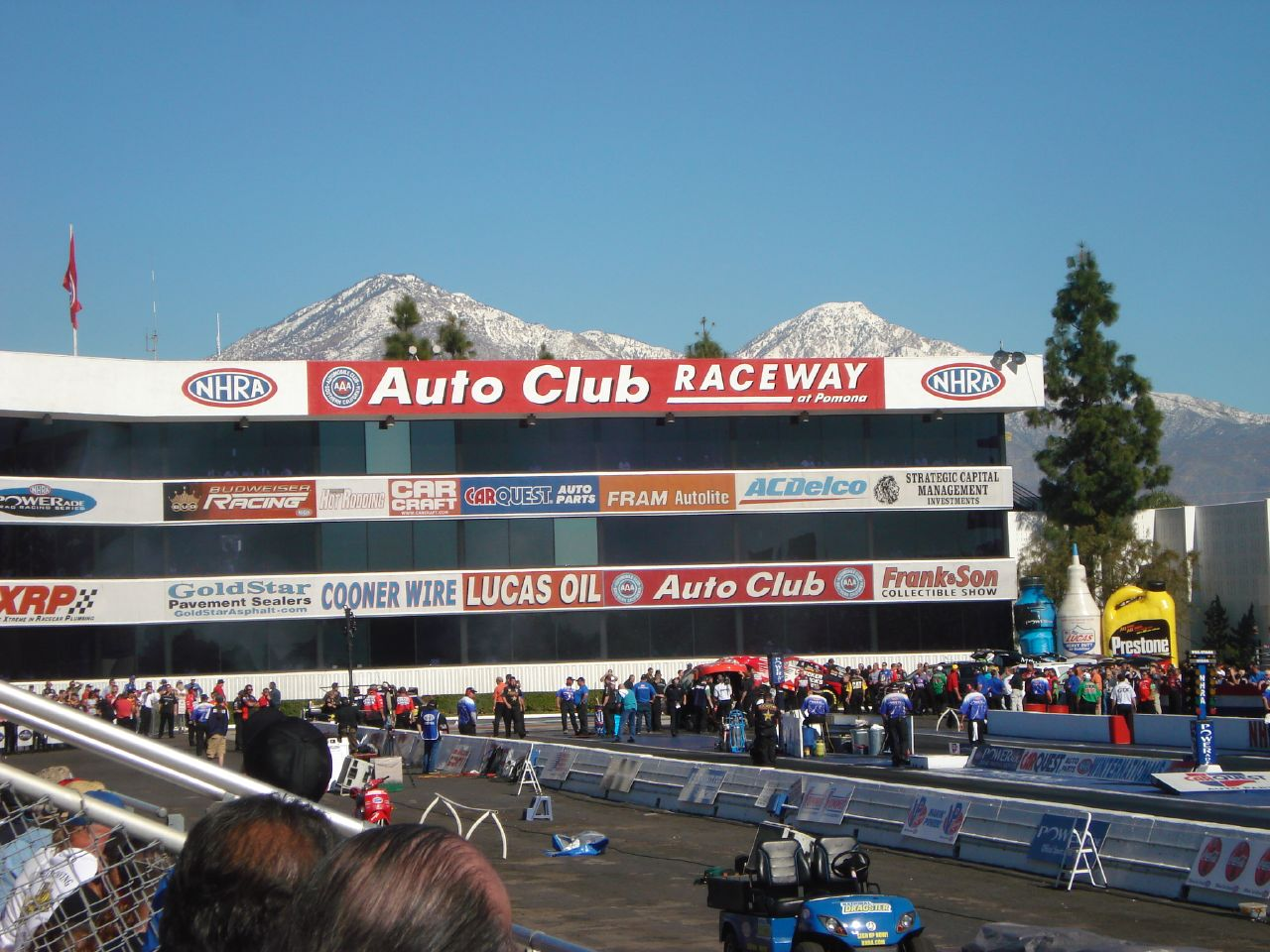
- Auto Club Raceway, 2008
- Location: Pomona, California, United States
- Coordinates: 34°05′42.32″N 117°46′11.15″W
- Capacity: 40,000
- Operator: NHRA
- Address: 2780 Fairplex Drive
- Opened: 1951
- Former names: Pomona Raceway; The Fairplex; Ascot at Pomona; Los Angeles Dragstrip; Auto Club Raceway at Pomona
- Major events: NHRA Mission Foods Drag Racing Series; Lucas Oil NHRA Winternationals; In-N-Out Burger NHRA Finals

Drag Strip
- Surface: Concrete
- Length: 0.250 mi (0.402 km)

The Pomona Raceway (currently named the In-N-Out Burger Pomona Dragstrip, previously named the Auto Club Raceway at Pomona) is a racing facility located in Pomona, California that features a quarter-mile dragstrip. Since its opening in 1961, the dragstrip has hosted the NHRA's Winternationals event – the traditional season opener – and since 2021, the season's last race, the NHRA Finals. These two events have contributed to its becoming perhaps one of the most famous dragstrips in North America. The facility has a seating capacity of 40,000 spectators and is one of the few dragstrips in the USA operated directly by the NHRA. The dragstrip has also gone by the nickname of The Fairplex, in reference to its location at the Fairplex, formerly called the Los Angeles County Fairgrounds.

== History ==
=== Drag Racing ===
In 1952, a car club known as the "Choppers of Pomona" aided by a young police officer, Sergeant Bud Coons, advocated that a safe place should be provided for local area drag racers. Coons, along with fellow hot rod enthusiast Pomona Police Chief Ralph Parker and the city government of Pomona, asked to lease the parking lot of the LA County Fairgrounds. Coons and Parker were instrumental in convincing the county to allow the use of the fairgrounds for the race by citing statistics showing that deaths among kids declined sharply when they were given a supervised place to race. The county finally agreed, as long as the hot rodders provided their own insurance, which they could cover with gate receipts.

At the time the county made the agreement, the parking lot was nothing but a gravel lot. The coalition of hot rodders, police, and community leaders raised funds through donations and paved the lot. This was the birth of the dragstrip in Pomona.

Though it was not considered a national event by today's standards, the very first NHRA event, the Southern California Championships, was held at the dragstrip on an April weekend in 1953. On Saturday, attendance was 2,000 to 3,000; on Sunday, it was reported as 15,000. Compared to the 3.9-second numbers (at 333 yd 1 ft (304.80 m) the pros are putting on the board presently, the best ET of that day was a respectable 10.93.

=== NHRA Winternationals ===
In 1961, NHRA held its first-ever Winternationals at the Pomona Raceway. It became NHRA's second national event. The first NHRA national event was the U.S. Nationals, which was nicknamed the "Big-Go". Thus, the Winternationals got nicknamed the "Big-Go West". It has remained at this location ever since. For many years, this event was sponsored by Chief Auto Parts and later its successor AutoZone, then by CSK Automotive, and now by its current successor, O'Reilly Auto Parts.

2008 saw Top Fuel & Funny Car races be reduced to the present 1000 feet.

From 2021 to present, the race has been held in late March or early April, after the Gainesville round. The 2021 race was later postponed to July-August in order to allow spectators.

=== NHRA Finals ===
The season closer, the NHRA Finals, was brought to the facility in 1984 from the now-defunct Orange County International Raceway. When the event was first brought to Pomona, it was sponsored by Winston (after NHRA's main title sponsor at the time, RJ Reynolds' "Winston" cigarette brand). From 2010 to 2019, and again from 2021 to 2022, the event was sponsored by the Automobile Club of Southern California, which is affiliated with AAA. The 2020 event was sponsored by Stellantis and Royal Dutch Shell when it was held at Las Vegas Motor Speedway because Clark County, Nevada, allowed spectators when California still banned mass gatherings because of the global pandemic. Beginning in 2023, In-N-Out Burger became the naming rights sponsor for both the circuit and the NHRA Finals.

In November 2025, due to adverse weather, NHRA canceled the race, and only the lower-level Sportsman classes were held. The two Top Alcohol classes were abandoned after the first round, and no professional categories were held.

=== Other racing ===
From 1934 to 1937 a 1/2 mile dirt oval was located at the facility. The dirt oval was once again opened in the 1950s but closed in 1959. Pomona was also home to a 1.7-mile paved road course, which operated in 1998 and 1999. From 1956 to 1961, a 2-mile temporary road course was located in the parking lot.

== Winners ==
=== NHRA Finals ===
Year	Venue	Top Fuel	Funny Car	Pro Stock	Pro Stock Motorcycle
1965	Tulsa	Maynard Rupp			
1966	Tulsa	Pete Robinson			
1967	Tulsa	Connie Kalitta	Don Nicholson		
1968	Tulsa	Don Prudhomme	Ed Schartman		
1969	Lewisville	L. Goldstein	Dick Harrell		
1970	Lewisville	Ron Martin	Gene Snow		
1971	Amarillo	Gerry Glenn	P. Castronovo		
1972	Amarillo	Jim Walther	L. Fullerton		
1973	Amarillo	Jerry Ruth	Frank Hall		
1974	Ontario	Don Garlits	Dave Condit	Bob Glidden	
1975	Ontario	Don Garlits	Don Prudhomme	Bob Glidden	
1976	Ontario	Shirley Muldowney	Don Prudhomme	Wally Booth	
1977	Ontario	Dennis Baca	Gordie Bonin	Bob Glidden	
1978	Ontario	Rob Bruins	Raymond Beadle	Bob Glidden	
1979	Ontario	Don Garlits	Gordie Bonin	Bob Glidden	
1980	Ontario	Shirley Muldowney	Ron Colson	Bob Glidden	
1981	East Irvine	Gary Beck	Jim Dunn	Lee Shepherd	
1982	East Irvine	Jim Barnard	Tripp Shumake	Warren Johnson	
1983	East Irvine	Shirley Muldowney	John Lombardo	Warren Johnson	
1984	Pomona	Don Garlits	Sherm Gunn	Bob Glidden	
1985	Pomona	Gary Beck	Kenny Bernstein	Joe Lepone	
1986	Pomona	Darrell Gwynn	Kenny Bernstein	Bob Glidden	
1987	Pomona	Darrell Gwynn	Billy Meyer	Bob Glidden	
1988	Pomona	Darrell Gwynn	John Force	Warren Johnson	
1989	Pomona	Gary Ormsby	Bruce Larson	Bob Glidden	
1990	Pomona	Joe Amato	Ed McCulloch	Bob Glidden	John Myers
1991	Pomona	Pat Austin	Al Hofmann	Darrell Alderman	Dave Schultz
1992	Pomona	Cory McClenathan	Chuck Etchells	Warren Johnson	Dave Schultz
1993	Pomona	Rance McDaniel	Jim Epler	Warren Johnson	Dave Schultz
1994	Pomona	Kenny Bernstein	John Force	Darrell Alderman	Dave Schultz
1995	Pomona	Blaine Johnson	Al Hofmann	Warren Johnson	John Myers
1996	Pomona	Joe Amato	John Force	Mike Edwards	John Smith
1997	Pomona	Joe Amato	Tony Pedregon	Kurt Johnson	Matt Hines
1998	Pomona	Kenny Bernstein	Chuck Etchells	Richie Stevens	Matt Hines
1999	Pomona	Mike Dunn	Jerry Toliver	Jeg Coughlin Jr	Antron Brown
2000	Pomona	Gary Scelzi	John Force	Kurt Johnson	Tony Mullen
2001	Pomona	Kenny Bernstein	Del Worsham	Bruce Allen	Angelle Sampey
2002	Pomona	Cory McClenathan	John Force	Kurt Johnson	Matt Hines
2003	Pomona	Kenny Bernstein	Del Worsham	Greg Anderson	Craig Treble
2004	Pomona	Tony Schumacher	John Force	Greg Anderson	Angelle Sampey
2005	Pomona	Tony Schumacher	Tony Pedregon	Jeg Coughlin Jr	Ryan Schnitz
2006	Pomona	Tony Schumacher	John Force	Greg Anderson	Craig Treble
2007	Pomona	Tony Schumacher	Robert Hight	Jeg Coughlin Jr	Matt Smith
2008	Pomona	Larry Dixon	Cruz Pedregon	Greg Anderson	Chris Rivas
2009	Pomona	Antron Brown	Mike Neff	Greg Anderson	Eddie Krawiec
2010	Pomona	Antron Brown	John Force	Shane Gray	Eddie Krawiec
2011	Pomona	Del Worsham	Matt Hagan	Greg Stanfield	Andrew Hines
2012	Pomona	Brandon Bernstein	Cruz Pedregon	Allen Johnson	Andrew Hines
2013	Pomona	Shawn Langdon	Matt Hagan	Rickie Jones	Eddie Krawiec
2014	Pomona	Morgan Lucas	Matt Hagan	Erica Enders-Stevens	Hector Arana Jr
2015	Pomona	Shawn Langdon	Del Worsham	Allen Johnson	Eddie Krawiec
2016	Pomona	Doug Kalitta	Tommy Johnson Jr.	Greg Anderson	Matt Smith
2017	Pomona	Brittany Force	Tommy Johnson Jr.	Bo Butner	Andrew Hines
2018	Pomona	Steve Torrence	J.R. Todd	Tanner Gray	Matt Smith
2019	Pomona	Doug Kalitta	Jack Beckman	Jeg Coughlin Jr	Jianna Everisto
2020	Las Vegas	Antron Brown	Matt Hagan	Erica Enders	Angie Smith
2021	Pomona	Steve Torrence	Bob Tasca III	Greg Anderson	Matt Smith
2022	Pomona	Austin Prock	Cruz Pedregon	Greg Anderson	Angie Smith
2023	Pomona	Doug Kalitta	Chad Green	Aaron Stanfield	Gaige Herrera
2024	Pomona	Antron Brown	Jack Beckman	Greg Anderson	Matt Smith
Rainout in 2025, Only Sportsman Classes Held
Year	Venue	Comp Elim	Super Comp (8.90)	Super Gas (9.90)	
2025	Pomona	Jason Grima	Chad Webber	Ed De Staute	

NOTE: The Finals has been held in the Southwest area from 1965 to 1973, the Los Angeles metropolitan area from 1974 to 2019, and again since 2021, and Las Vegas in 2020.

== Current track records ==
Category	E.T.	Speed	Driver	Event	Ref
Top Fuel	3.628		Clay Millican	2018 Winternationals	
Top Fuel		338.94 mph (545.47 km/h)	Brittany Force	2022 NHRA Finals	
Funny Car	3.804		Austin Prock	2024 NHRA Finals	
Funny Car		341.68 mph (549.88 km/h)	Austin Prock	2024 NHRA Finals	
Pro Stock	6.480		Erica Enders	2014 NHRA Finals	
Pro Stock		213.84 mph (344.14 km/h)	Drew Skillman	2015 NHRA Finals	
