= Ed Krawiec =

American motorcycle racer

Eddie Krawiec
- Nationality: American
- Born: December 6, 1976 (age 49) Englishtown, New Jersey, U.S.
- Current team: Vance & Hines

NHRA Camping World Drag Racing Series
- Years active: 2004-2023
- Teams: Vance & Hines
- Championships: 4 (PSM)
- Wins: 49
- Fastest laps: Best ET; 6.692 seconds; Best Speed; 203.92 mph (328.18 km/h)

Championship titles
- 2008, 2011, 2012, 2017: NHRA Pro Stock Motorcycle Champion
- Statistics up to date as of September 16, 2025.

Eddie Krawiec (born December 6, 1976, in Englishtown, New Jersey) is a former NHRA Camping World Drag Racing Series Pro Stock Motorcycle racer, and four time Pro Stock Motorcycle champion. He piloted the No. 2 Buell Motorcycles Pro Stock bike for Vance & Hines as a teammate to fellow four time Pro Stock Motorcycle champion Andrew Hines. He currently serves as crew chief for Vance & Hines rider Richard Gadson.

== Racing career ==
Krawiec a former AMA Prostar racer, served as a full-time employee of Old Bridge Township Raceway Park from 1999 through 2007, and became dragstrip manager in 2001.

On November 16, 2008, Krawiec overcame a 19-point deficit to win his first NHRA Full Throttle Pro Stock Motorcycle championship by five points over second-place finisher Chris Rivas. Krawiec did this, despite never having won an official event in his career. He is only the second NHRA driver to win a championship without winning an event in the same year.

In 2012, Krawiec captured his third NHRA title (and second consecutive title) at Auto Club Raceway in Pomona at the Automobile Club of Southern California NHRA Finals and won his fourth Pro Stock motorcycle title in 2017. Krawiec has 49 career wins in the Pro Stock Motorcycle division.

Sporting positions
Preceded by LE Tonglet	NHRA Full Throttle Pro Stock Motorcycle Champion; 2011, 2012	Succeeded by Matt Smith
