= Texas Motorplex =

American drag racing facility

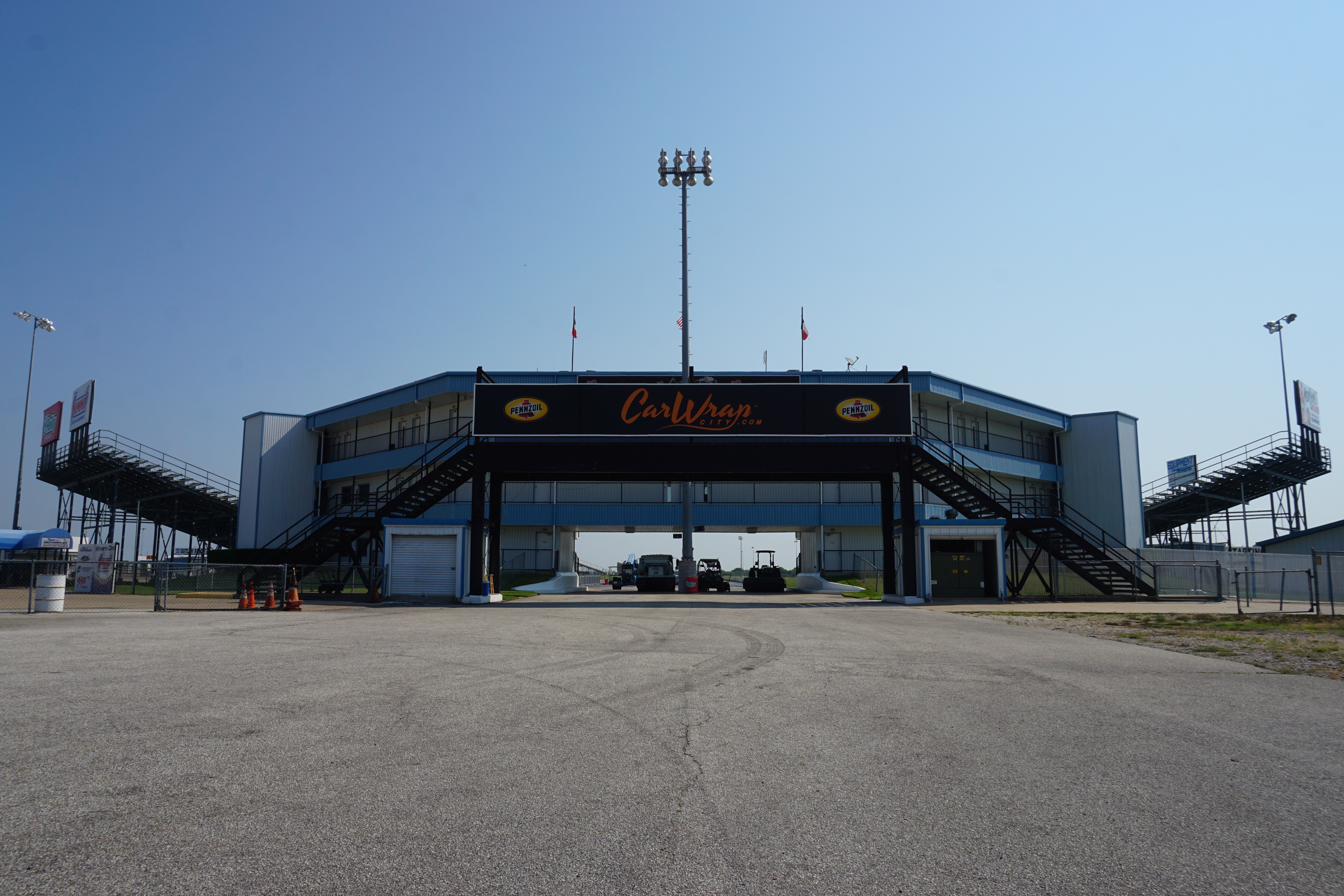
- Location: Ennis, Texas, United States
- Coordinates: 32.3286°N 96.7174°W
- Capacity: 50,000
- Owner: Billy Meyer & Christie Meyer Johnson
- Address: 7500 US-287
- Broke ground: 1986
- Opened: 1986
- Major events: NHRA Mission Foods Drag Racing Series; Texas NHRA FallNationals (1986-present); Stampede of Speed
- Website: http://www.texasmotorplex.com

Drag Strip
- Surface: Concrete
- Length: 0.250 mi (.402 km)

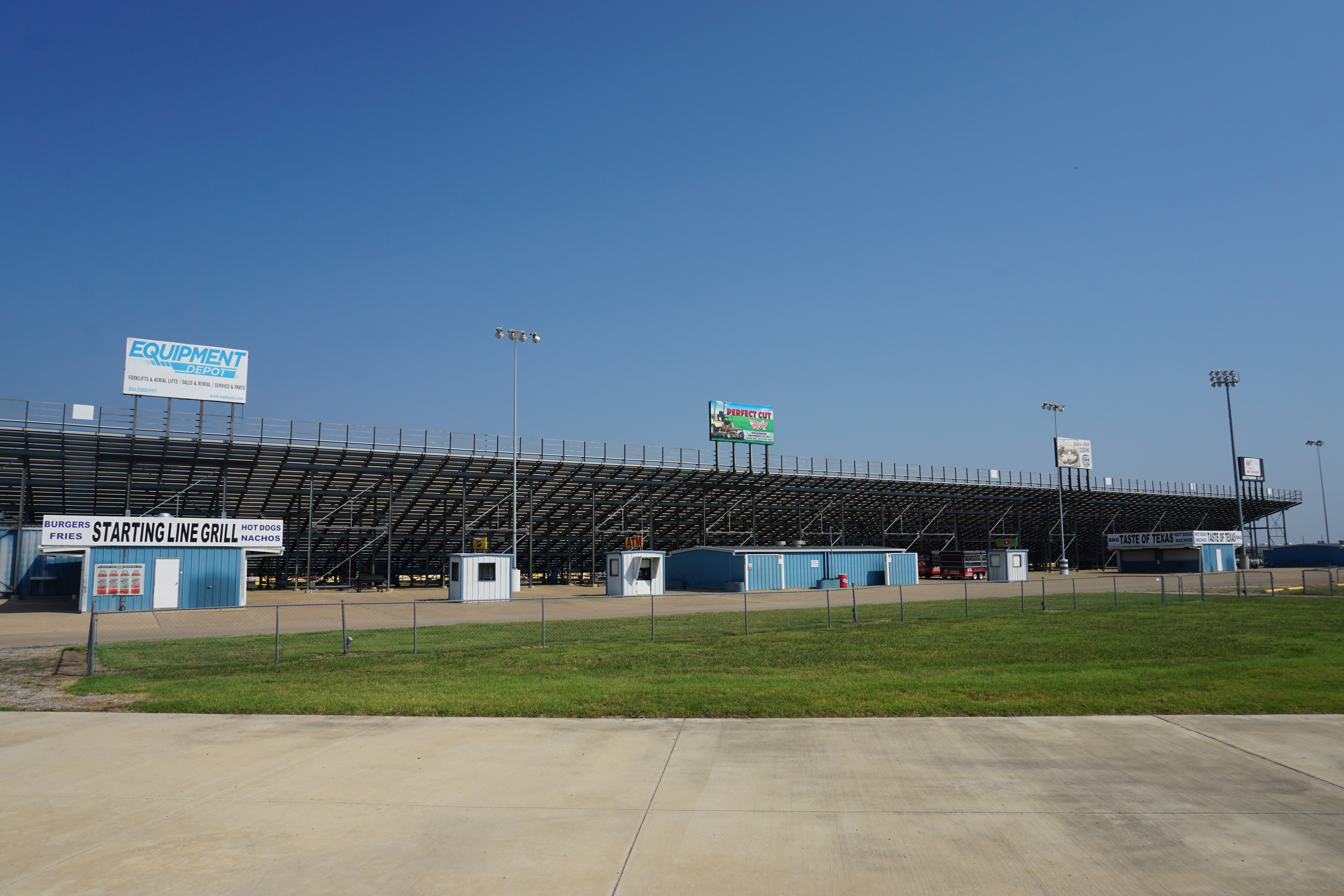
Texas Motorplex grandstands

The Texas Motorplex is a quarter mile drag racing facility located in Ennis, Texas, United States, 40 miles (64 km) south of downtown Dallas. Built in 1986 by former funny car driver Billy Meyer, the Motorplex was the first National Hot Rod Association (NHRA) "super track." It annually hosts the Texas NHRA FallNationals each October, when hundreds of professional and amateur drag racers compete for over $2 million in prize money. Past winners have included John Force, Kenny Bernstein, and Tony Schumacher.

== History ==
The Texas Motorplex was the first all-concrete stadium-style drag racing facility ever constructed. Built in 1986, The Texas Motorplex has been the place of many drag racing milestones and world record performances. The Billy Meyer-owned facility hosts a number of racing and car show events between March and November each year and also features the Champions Club – an 11,000-square-foot (1,000 m^{2}) facility – that serves fully catered events throughout the year.

== Texas Motorplex Milestones ==
Nov. 1985: Billy Meyer signs an agreement to host an NHRA event the following September, before ground was broken on the facility.

Jan. 1986: Ground breaks for the Texas Motorplex – designed to be the first post tension, all-concrete, quarter-mile facility specifically created for drag racing.

Sept. 25, 1986: Darrell Gwynn runs 5.280 to set Top Fuel E.T. record with the first national event pass on the track.

April 9, 1988: Eddie Hill turns in the first four-second quarter mile pass – a 4.990 run.

Oct. 18, 1993: John Force officially scores the NHRA legally recognised four-second quarter mile Funny Car pass set on October 16 of 4.997 seconds when he successfully backed it up during the race.

April 1997: The Texas Motorplex becomes the first non-NHRA-owned track to host two national events.

1997: The Texas Motorplex opens the Divisional 4 Hall of Fame, becoming the only track to host a hall of fame.

1997: The Texas Motorplex becomes the first facility to build a permanent hospitality structure to host fans in a VIP atmosphere; originally known as The Top Eliminator Club and now known as the Champions Club.

Oct. 19, 1997: Cory McClenathan makes the first pass in the 320 mph-range – a 321.77 run.

Oct. 24, 1998: Gary Scelzi, John Force, Warren Johnson and Larry Kopp lead the quickest qualifying field in NHRA history.

Oct. 23, 1999: En route to his first, NHRA championship, Top Fuel driver Tony Schumacher earns his first national event victory.

Oct. 23, 1999: John Force clinched his ninth NHRA Funny Car championship by defeating Tommy Johnson Jr. in the quickest side-by-side race in Funny Car history.

Sept. 23, 2004: The Texas Motorplex becomes the first NHRA track in the country to have starting line balcony seating in the tower suites.

Sept. 26, 2004: Greg Anderson clinches his second consecutive NHRA Pro Stock title at the Texas Motorplex. Anderson clinched the title faster than any other driver in NHRA history.

== Current Track Records ==
Category	E.T.	Speed	Driver	Event	Ref
Top Fuel	3.636		Steve Torrance	2023 Texas NHRA FallNationals	
Top Fuel		340.57 mph (548.09 km/h)	Brittany Force	2025 Texas NHRA FallNationals	
Funny Car	3.813		Austin Prock	2024 Texas NHRA FallNationals	
Funny Car		338.60 mph (544.92 km/h)	Robert Hight	2017 Texas NHRA FallNationals	
Pro Stock	6.457		Greg Anderson	2015 Texas NHRA FallNationals	
Pro Stock		214.59 mph (345.35 km/h)	Greg Anderson	2015 Texas NHRA FallNationals	
Pro Stock Motorcycle	6.627		Gaige Herrera	2023 Texas NHRA FallNationals	
Pro Stock Motorcycle		204.16 mph (328.56 km/h)	Gaige Herrera	2023 Texas NHRA FallNationals	
