= 2021 NHRA Camping World Drag Racing Series =

2021 NHRA Camping World Drag Racing Series season
- League: NHRA
- Sport: Drag racing
- Champions: Steve Torrence (TF); Ron Capps (FC); Greg Anderson (PS); Matt Smith (PSM)

NHRA seasons
- ← 2020 2022 →

The 2021 NHRA Camping World Drag Racing Season was announced on October 6, 2020.

It is the 66th season of the National Hot Rod Association's top drag racing competition. The NHRA will have 20 Top Fuel and Funny Car events, 17 Pro Stock events (17 Championship NHRA Formula and 5 Non-Championship Mountain Motor Formula; 2 events will showcase both classes), and 15 Pro Stock Motorcycle events.

== Schedule ==
Schedule released October 6, 2020 (most recently revised May 14, 2021).

2021 NHRA Camping World Drag Racing Series Schedule
Date	Race	Site	TV	Winners			
Date	Race	Site	TV	Top Fuel	Funny Car	Pro Stock	PS Motorcycle
Mar 11–14	Amalie Motor Oil NHRA Gatornationals	Gainesville, FL	Fox	Josh Hart (1)	J.R. Todd (1)	Greg Anderson (1)	Matt Smith (1)
Apr 16–18	DENSO Auto Parts NHRA Four-Wide Nationals ^{4 Lanes}	Las Vegas, NV	FS1	Steve Torrence (1)	Bob Tasca III (1)	Erica Enders (1)	Ryan Oehler (1)
Apr 30 – May 2	NHRA Southern Nationals**	Commerce, GA	FS1	Antron Brown (1)	Bob Tasca III (2)	Greg Anderson (2)	Scotty Pollacheck (1)
May 14–16	NGK NTK NHRA Four-Wide Nationals ^{4 Lanes}	Concord, NC	FS1*	Steve Torrence (2)	John Force (1)	Dallas Glenn (1)	Steve Johnson (1)
May 21–24	Mopar Express Lane NHRA SpringNationals presented by Pennzoil	Baytown, TX	FS1#	Steve Torrence (3)	Robert Hight (1)	Matt Hartford (1)	N/A
Jun 11–13	TascaParts.com NHRA New England Nationals presented by Bandero Premium Tequila	Epping, NH	Fox	Billy Torrence (1)	John Force (2)	Aaron Stanfield (1)	N/A
Jun 24–27	Summit Racing Equipment NHRA Nationals	Norwalk, OH	Fox	Steve Torrence (4)	Cruz Pedregon (1)	Erica Enders (2)	Matt Smith (2)
Jul 16–18	Dodge Mile-High NHRA Nationals presented by Pennzoil	Morrison, CO	FS1	Steve Torrence (5)	Matt Hagan (1)	N/A	Matt Smith (3)
Jul 23–25	NHRA Sonoma Nationals	Sonoma, CA	FS1	Steve Torrence (6)	Robert Hight (2)	Aaron Stanfield (2)	Karen Stoffer (1)
Jul 30 – Aug 1	Lucas Oil Winternationals**	Pomona, CA	Fox	Leah Pruett (1)	Ron Capps (1)	Aaron Stanfield (3)	Matt Smith (4)
Aug 13–15	Menards NHRA Nationals presented by PetArmor	Topeka, KS	Fox	Brittany Force (1)	John Force (3)	Dallas Glenn (2)	N/A
Aug 20–22	Lucas Oil NHRA Nationals	Brainerd, MN	Fox	Steve Torrence (7)	Matt Hagan (2)	JR Carr^{MM}	N/A
Sep 1–5	Dodge//SRT NHRA U.S. Nationals ^{1.5}	Brownsburg, IN	Fox	Steve Torrence (8)	Tim Wilkerson (1)	Erica Enders (3)	Eddie Krawiec (1)
Countdown to the Championship
Sep 9–12	Mopar Express Lane NHRA Nationals presented by Pennzoil	Mohnton, PA	FS1	Billy Torrence (2)	Tommy Johnson Jr. (1)	Greg Anderson (3)	Steve Johnson (2)
Sep 17–19	NHRA DeWalt Nationals	Concord, NC	Fox*	Josh Hart (2)	Tim Wilkerson (2)	Kyle Koretsky (1)	Angelle Sampey (1)
Sep 24–26	NHRA Midwest Nationals	Madison, IL	FS1	Steve Torrence (9)	Matt Hagan (3)	Erica Enders (4)	N/A
Sep 24–26	NHRA Midwest Nationals	Madison, IL	FS1	Steve Torrence (9)	Matt Hagan (3)	Joseph Arrowsmith^{MM}	
Oct 7–10	Texas NHRA FallNationals	Ennis, TX	FS1	Justin Ashley (1)	Ron Capps (2)	Greg Anderson (4)	Matt Smith (5)
Oct 15-17	NHRA Thunder Valley Nationals	Bristol, TN	FS1	Mike Salinas (1)	Alexis DeJoria (1)	N/A	Angelle Sampey (2)
Oct 29–31	Dodge NHRA Nationals presented by Pennzoil	Las Vegas, NV	FS1	Steve Torrence (10)	Cruz Pedregon (2)	Dallas Glenn (3)	Steve Johnson (3)
Nov 11–14	Auto Club NHRA Finals ^{1.5}	Pomona, CA	FS1	Steve Torrence (11)	Bob Tasca III (3)	Greg Anderson (5)	Matt Smith (6)

* Finals televised on tape delay. Charlotte 2 aired with a split broadcast schedule. Markets with the early NFL game (1 PM ET start) will air the race on tape delay at 4:30 PM. Markets with the late game (4:05 PM ET) will air the finals live at 2 PM.

# The Mopar Express Lane NHRA SpringNationals presented by Pennzoil finished final eliminations on Monday May 24 due to inclement weather halting action during Round 1 of Top Fuel eliminations.

Some races will be held with three round of qualifying, while other will be held with only two rounds of qualifying. ** Race will be held with two rounds of qualifying.

MM Pro Stock Car at this event is a non-championship race featuring the Mountain Motor formula, which has no engine displacement limit, can use carburetors or electronic fuel injection, and weighs a minimum of 2,450 pounds, compared to the NHRA Pro Stock formula that features electronic fuel injection, a 500ci (8193cc) engine displacement limit, and 2,350 pounds weight. All two-lane Mountain Motor races will feature eight-car fields.

=== Additional rules for specially marked races ===
4 Lanes: The Four-Wide Nationals in both Las Vegas and Charlotte in the spring will compete with cars on four lanes.

- All cars will qualify on each lane as all four lanes will be used in qualifying.
- Three rounds with cars using all four lanes.
- In Rounds One and Two, the top two drivers (of four) will advance to the next round.
- The pairings are set as follows:
  - Race One: 1, 8, 9, 16
  - Race Two: 4, 5, 12, 13
  - Race Three: 2, 7, 10, 15
  - Race Four: 3, 6, 11, 14
  - Semifinal One: Top two in Race One and Race Two
  - Semifinal Two: Top two in Race Three and Race Four
  - Finals: Top two in Semifinal One and Semifinal Two
- Lane choice determined by times in previous round. In first round, lane choice determined by fastest times.
- Drivers who advance in Rounds One and Two will receive 20 points for each round advancement.
- In Round Three, the winner of the race will be declared the race winner and will collect 40 points. The runner-up will receive 20 points. Third and fourth place drivers will be credited as semifinal losers.

1.5: The U. S. Nationals and Auto Club Finals will have their race points increased by 50% . Drivers who qualify but are eliminated in the first round receive 30 points, and each round win is worth 30 points. The top four receive 10, 9, 8, and 7 points, respectively, for qualifying positions, with the 5–6 drivers receiving 6 points, 7–8 drivers receiving 5 points, 9–12 receiving 4 points, and 13–16 receiving 3 points. Also, the top four, not three, drivers after each session receive points for fastest times in each round (4-3-2-1).

MM: Pro Stock Car at this event is a non-championship race with the Mountain Motor formula. At St. Louis, both NHRA Formula and Mountain Motor will race.

== Schedule changes ==
The NHRA Southern Nationals at Atlanta Dragway in Commerce, GA was originally set to take place March 26–28 but due to implications regarding the COVID-19 pandemic the event was moved to April 30 – May 2.

The Lucas Oil NHRA Winternationals presented by ProtectTheHarvest.com at Auto Club Raceway at Pomona, CA originally scheduled for April 9–11, was postponed July 31-August 1 due to health and safety guidelines by state and federal health officials.

Due to a full second-half schedule and travel logistics, the 2021 Virginia NHRA Nationals was canceled.

== Removed and merged events ==
=== Cancelled ===
Two venues lost their NHRA Camping World Drag Racing Series event entirely during the 2021 season as a result of the COVID-19 pandemic. Dates listed in original order.

- NHRA Arizona Nationals: April 23–25 (Replaced by Bristol)
- Flav-R-Pac Northwest Nationals: July 31-August 1 (Date replaced by Pomona 1)
- Virginia Motorsports Park originally set for June 2–4 but was first postponed then cancelled
