= 2008 NHRA Powerade Drag Racing Series season =

2008 NHRA Drag Racing Season
- League: NHRA
- Sport: Drag racing
- Champions: Tony Schumacher (TF); Cruz Pedregon (FC); Jeg Coughlin (PS); Eddie Krawiec (PSM)

NHRA seasons
- ← 2007 2009 →

The 2008 NHRA Powerade Drag Racing Series consisted of 24 national events held at tracks across the U.S. The first 18 events made up the regular season, with the final events making up the "Countdown to 1". This season marked the introduction of 1000' drag racing for the nitro competitors after the death of Funny Car driver Scott Kalitta in Englishtown, N.J. John Force returned to competition after his near fatal crash in Dallas toward the end of the 2007 Season. John's daughter Ashley became the first female funny car winner beating her father John in the finals at Atlanta. This season also marked the most dominant season by a professional driver in history, as Tony Schumacher won 15 races and became the only driver in the countdown era to clinch the championship before the season finale.

== Schedule ==
Date	Race	Site	Winners			
Date	Race	Site	Top Fuel	Funny Car	Pro Stock	Pro Stock Motorcycle
February 7–10	Kragen O'Reilly NHRA Winternationals	Pomona, California	Tony Schumacher	Robert Hight	Greg Anderson	N/A
February 22–24	Checker Shucks Kragen Nationals	Phoenix, Ariz.	Larry Dixon	Jack Beckman	V Gaines	N/A
March 13–16	ACDelco NHRA Gatornationals	Gainesville, Fla	Tony Schumacher	Tony Pedregon	Jeg Coughlin	Matt Guidera
March 28–30	O'Reilly NHRA Spring Nationals	Houston, Texas	Antron Brown	Del Worsham	Greg Anderson	Matt Smith
April 10–13	SummitRacing.com NHRA Nationals	Las Vegas, Nev.	Cory MaClenathan	Tim Wilkerson	Jason Line	N/A
April 24–27	Summit Racing Equipment NHRA Southern Nationals	Atlanta, Ga.	Antron Brown	Ashley Force	Mike Edwards	Andrew Hines
May 1–3	O'Reilly NHRA Midwest Nationals	Madison, Ill.	Rod Fuller	Tim Wilkerson	Kurt Johnson	Andrew Hines
May 16–18	NHRA Thunder Valley Nationals	Bristol, Tenn.	Tony Schumacher	Melanie Troxel	Dave Connoly	N/A
May 30–June 1	O'Reilly NHRA Summer Nationals	Topeka, Kan.	Hillary Will	John Force	Ron Krisher	N/A
June 5–8	Torco Racing Fuels Route 66 NHRA Nationals	Chicago, Ill.	Tony Schumacher	Tony Pedregon	Kurt Johnson	Chris Rivas
June 19–22	Lucas Oil NHRA SuperNationals	Englishtown, N.J.	Tony Schumacher	Tim Wilkerson	Greg Anderson	Chip Ellis
June 26–29	Summit Racing Equipment NHRA Nationals	Norwalk, Ohio	Doug Herbert	Tony Pedregon	Greg Anderson	Hector Arana
July 11–13	Mopar Mile-High NHRA Nationals	Denver, Colo.	Tony Schumacher	Tim Wilkerson	Greg Anderson	Matt Smith
July 18–20	NHRA Shucks Auto Supply Nationals	Seattle, Wash.	Tony Schumacher	Tony Bartone	Jason Line	N/A
July 25–27	Fram Autolite NHRA Nationals	Sonoma, Calif.	Tony Schumacher	Robert Hight	Dave Connolly	Matt Guidera
August 7–10	Lucas Oil NHRA Nationals	Brainerd, Minn.	Tony Schumacher	Tony Pedregon	Kurt Johnson	Matt Smith
August 14–17	Toyo Tires NHRA Nationals	Reading, Pa.	Tony Schumacher	Jack Beckman	Jeg Coughlin	Matt Smith
August 27-September 1	54th Mac Tools U.S. Nationals	Indianapolis, Ind.	Tony Schumacher	Robert Hight	Dave Connolly	Steve Johnson
2008 Countdown to the Championship
September 11–14	NHRA Carolinas Nationals	Concord, N.C.	Tony Schumacher	Jack Beckman	Justin Humphreys	Steve Johnson
September 18–21	O'Reilly Super Start Batteries NHRA Fall Nationals	Dallas, Texas	J.R. Todd	Tim Wilkerson	Greg Stanfield	Chris Rivas
September 26–28	O'Reilly NHRA Mid-South Nationals	Memphis, Tenn.	Tony Schumacher	Tim Wilkerson	Mike Edwards	Craig Treble
October 10–12	Virginia NHRA Nationals	Richmond, Va.	Tony Schumacher	Cruz Pedregon	Dave Connolly	N/A
October 30 – November 2	NHRA Las Vegas Nationals	Las Vegas, Nev.	Tony Schumacher	Cruz Pedregon	Jeg Coughlin	Chris Rivas
November 13–16	Automobile Club of Southern California NHRA Finals	Pomona, California	Larry Dixon	Cruz Pedregon	Greg Anderson	Chris Rivas

== Points standings ==
Top Fuel
Position	Driver	Points	Points Back	Chassis
1	**Tony Schumacher**	2703	-	Hadman
2	Larry Dixon	2445	-258	Hadman
3	Cory McClenathan	2406	-297	Hadman
4	Hillary Will	2405	-298	Attac
5	Antron Brown	2370	-333	Hadman
6	Rod Fuller	2368	-335	Hadman
7	Brandon Bernstein	2327	-376	McKinney
8	Doug Herbert	2307	-396	McKinney
9	Doug Kalitta	2209	-494	Attac
10	David Grubnic	2194	-509	Hadman

Funny Car
Position	Driver	Points	Points Back	Make
1	**Cruz Pedregon**	2561	-	Advance Auto Parts Toyota Solara
2	Tim Wilkerson	2468	-93	Levi Ray & Shoup Chevrolet Impala
3	Jack Beckman	2457	-104	MTS/Valvoline Dodge Charger
4	Robert Hight	2442	-119	AAA. of So. California Ford Mustang
5	Tony Pedregon	2440	-121	Quaker State/Herzog Chevrolet Impala
6	Ashley Force Hood	2385	-176	Castrol GTX Ford Mustang
7	John Force	2303	-258	Castrol High Mileage Ford Mustang
8	Ron Capps	2302	-259	NAPA Auto Parts Dodge Charger
9	Mike Neff	2284	-277	Old Spice Ford Mustang
10	Gary Densham	2217	-344	Racebricks Chevrolet Impala

Pro Stock
Position	Driver	Points	Points Back	Make/Model
1	**Jeg Coughlin Jr.**	2523	-	JEGS.com Chevrolet Cobalt
2	Greg Anderson	2487	-36	Summit Racing Pontiac GXP
3	Kurt Johnson	2450	-73	ACDelco Chevrolet Cobalt
4	Mike Edwards	2388	-135	YoungLife/Penhall Pontiac GXP
5	Jason Line	2388	-135	Summit Racing Pontiac GXP
6	Dave Connolly	2383	-140	Charter Communications Chevrolet Cobalt
7	Allen Johnson	2363	-160	Mopar Parts Dodge Stratus
8	Greg Stanfield	2329	-194	Attitude Apparel Pontiac GXP
9	V Gaines	2234	-289	Kendall Dodge Stratus
10	Ron Krisher	2158	-368	Valvoline Chevrolet Cobalt

Pro Stock Motorcycle
Position	Driver	Points	Points Back	Make
1	**Ed Krawiec**	2471	-	Harley-Davidson
2	Chris Rivas	2466	-5	Buell
3	Matt Smith	2451	-20	Suzuki
4	Andrew Hines	2334	-137	Harley-Davidson
5	Angelle Sampey	2310	-161	Buell
6	Chip Ellis	2284	-187	Suzuki
7	Steve Johnson	2283	-188	Suzuki
8	Craig Treble	2270	-201	Suzuki
9	Karen Stoffer	2167	-304	Suzuki
10	Matt Guidera	2156	-315	Buell

- Drivers in **bold** have clinched the championship
