= Peak (automotive products) =

American automotive and chemical company

Old World Industries, LLC.
- Formerly: Old World Trading Company
- Type: Private
- Industry: Automotive, chemical
- Founded: November 1, 1973; 52 years ago
- Founders: J. Thomas Hurvis; Riaz H. Waraich
- Headquarters: 3100 Sanders Rd., Northbrook, Illinois, U.S.
- Brands: PEAK, BlueDEF
- Revenue: 8,106,279 (2021)
- Number of employees: 245 (2021)
- Website: www.oldworldind.com www.peakauto.com

Old World Industries (OWI) is an American automotive and chemical company best known for their PEAK brand of motor oil, antifreeze and other automotive products. The company markets itself as an "independent, family-owned business". It sells products in over 60 countries.

== History ==
The company was founded in 1973 as a chemical trading company by ad agency owner Tom Hurvis and his friend, Pakistan-born cotton exporter Riaz Waraich during a Petrochemical shortage related to the 1973 oil crisis. The company began exporting cotton to Asia and Europe in 1984. In 1986, Old World purchased the Peak brand from Enron Chemical, becoming the second-best-selling brand of antifreeze in the U.S. by 1994. The company introduced a line of spark plugs called SplitFire in 1990.

In 1999, OWI purchased chemical company Celanese AG (spun off from parent company Celanese), which focused on Ethylene oxide and Ethylene glycol production based in Clear Lake, Texas. In 2012, Old World sold the chemical division to Thailand-based Indorama Ventures for $795 million.

== Brands ==
- PEAK
- BlueDEF – Diesel exhaust fluid marketed under the PEAK brand
- Sierra – marketed as a safer alternative antifreeze
- Fleet Charge – engine coolant
- Final Charge – heavy duty engine coolant
- Blue Mountain Professional – windshield wiper blades
- SmartBLADE – wiper blades

== Endorsements ==
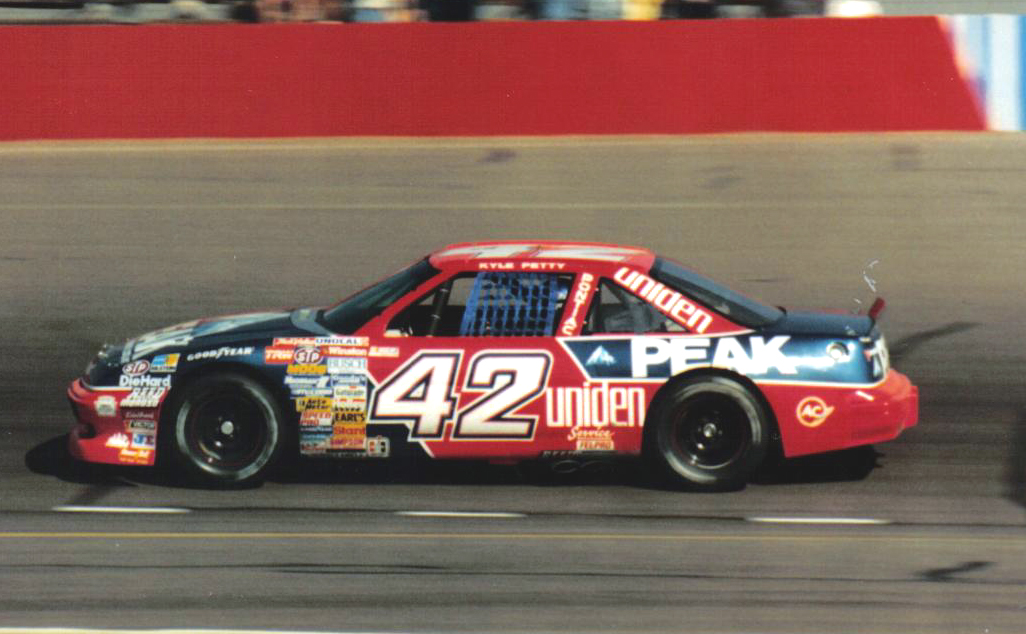
Kyle Petty in 1989

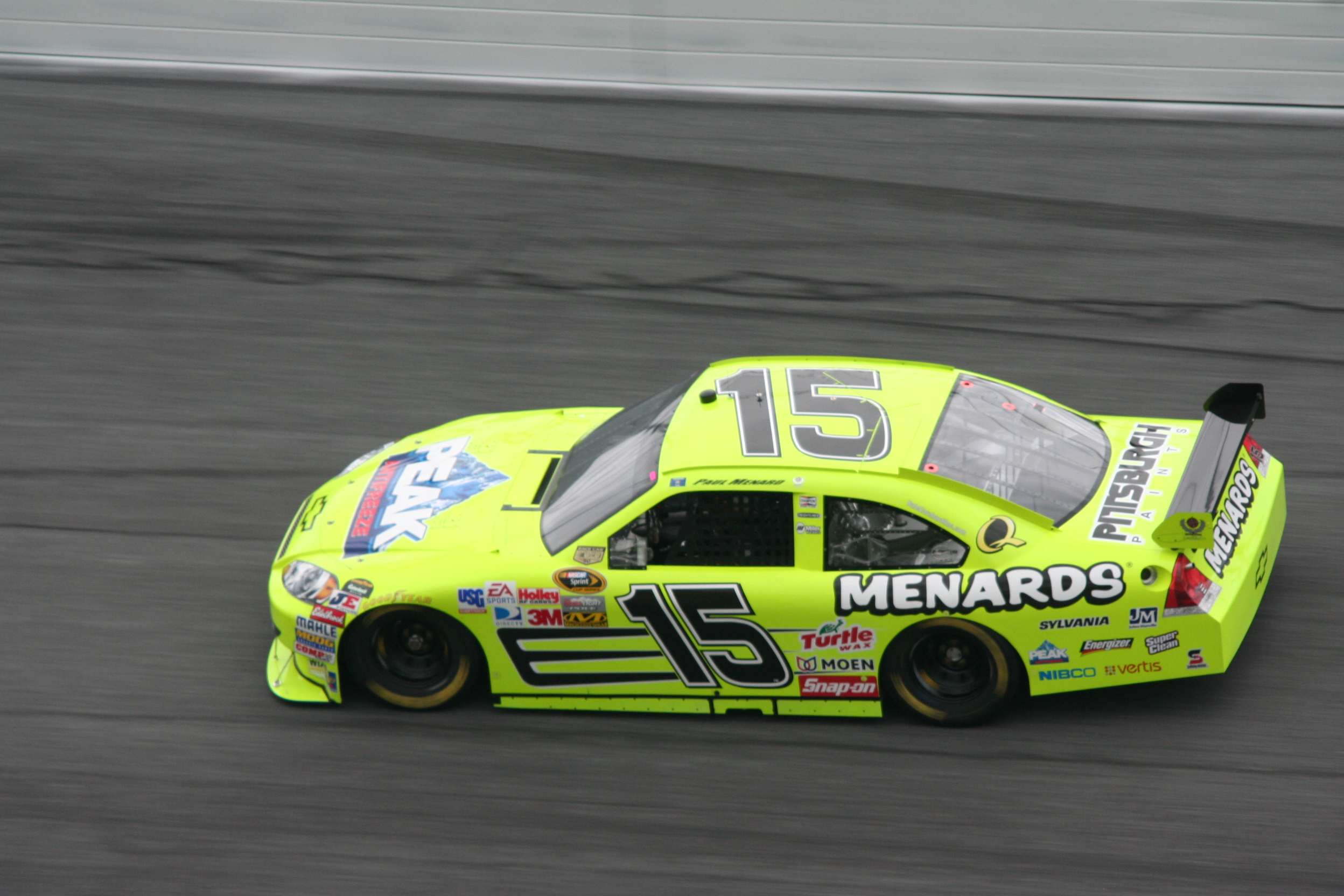
Paul Menard's Menards/PEAK Antifreeze Chevy in 2008

PEAK is known for its sponsorship of motorsports teams and events, primarily in the IndyCar Series, NASCAR, and the NHRA. OWI sponsored the fall Sprint Cup Series event at Dover International Speedway from 1989 to 1992 as the PEAK Antifreeze 500 and from 1993 to 1994 as the SplitFire Spark Plug 500. It began sponsoring NASCAR's online iRacing.com series in 2009, becoming the title sponsor in 2014 for what is now the NASCAR Peak Antifreeze Series. The iRacing Sponsorship ended in 2020. The brand announced it would sponsor the NASCAR Mexico Series, beginning in 2017, on October 18, 2016. As a result, the series was officially renamed to the NASCAR PEAK Mexico Series. The Mexico Series sponsorship ended in 2022.

The fictional racing team "Chip Hart Racing" in the 24 Hours of Daytona scenes from the F1 movie was sponsored by PEAK and had its logo on the #120 Wright Motorsports Porsche 911 GT3 R that was used for filming and raced at the 2024 24 Hours of Daytona.

=== Drivers and teams endorsed by PEAK ===
- Kyle Petty (NASCAR) – drove a PEAK-sponsored car for Team SABCO from 1989 to 1990
- Danica Patrick (Indycar & NASCAR) - Was a spokesperson for PEAK from 2005 to 2014.
- Michael Waltrip (NASCAR) - Joined his race team in 2013 and has personally sponsored Waltrip in a couple races from 2014 to 2016. The PEAK website still lists him as a member of "Team PEAK" as of 2018.
- Clint Bowyer (NASCAR) – Ran a PEAK-sponsored car for a handful of races from 2013 to 2016 while driving for Michael Waltrip Racing and HScott Motorsports. Bowyer and PEAK reunited at Stewart–Haas Racing in 2019.
- Paul Menard (NASCAR) – through the Menards company
- John Force Racing (NHRA) – Drivers John, Courtney, and Brittany Force and Robert Hight
- Daniel Suárez (NASCAR) - drove a PEAK-sponsored car for Joe Gibbs Racing for a couple races in the Monster Energy NASCAR Cup Series and NASCAR Xfinity Series from 2017 to 2018.
- Matt Kenseth (NASCAR) - drove a PEAK-sponsored car for Joe Gibbs Racing for a couple races in 2017.
- Haas F1 Team (Formula 1) – Car No. 8 (Romain Grosjean) and 20 (Kevin Magnussen)
- Ryan Blaney (NASCAR) - through the Menards company
