= 2009 NHRA Full Throttle Drag Racing Series season =

- League: NHRA
- Sport: Drag racing
- Champions: Tony Schumacher (TF); Robert Hight (FC); Mike Edwards (PS); Hector Arana (PSM)

NHRA seasons
- ← 2008 2010 →

The 2009 NHRA Full Throttle Drag Racing Season consisted of 24 national events held at tracks across the U.S. The first 18 events made up the regular season, with the final events making up the "Countdown to 1".

== Schedule ==
2009 NHRA Full Throttle Schedule
| Date | Race | Site | Winners | | | |
| Date | Race | Site | Top Fuel | Funny Car | Pro Stock | Pro Stock Motorcycle |
|---|---|---|---|---|---|---|
| February 5–8 | Kragen O'Reilly NHRA Winternationals | Pomona, California | Doug Kalitta | Ron Capps | Jason Line | N/A |
| February 20–22 | Lucas Oil Slick Mist NHRA Nationals | Phoenix, Ariz. | Antron Brown | Ron Capps | Jeg Coughlin | N/A |
| March 12–15 | ACDelco NHRA Gatornationals | Gainesville, Fla | Larry Dixon | Bob Tasca III | Jason Line | Hector Arana |
| March 27–29 | O'Reilly NHRA Spring Nationals | Houston, Texas | Tony Schumacher | Ashley Force Hood | Ron Krisher | Craig Treble |
| April 2–5 | SummitRacing.com NHRA Nationals | Las Vegas, Nev. | Tony Schumacher | Ron Capps | Jeg Coughlin | N/A |
| April 16–19 | Summit Racing Equipment NHRA Southern Nationals | Atlanta, Ga. | Morgan Lucas | Jack Beckman | Mike Edwards | Eddie Krawiec |
| May 1–3 | O'Reilly NHRA Midwest Nationals | Madison, Ill. | Antron Brown | Del Worsham | Jeg Coughlin | Eddie Krawiec |
| May 15–17 | NHRA Thunder Valley Nationals | Bristol, Tenn. | Tony Schumacher | Del Worsham | Mike Edwards | N/A |
| May 29–31 | O'Reilly NHRA Summer Nationals | Topeka, Kan. | Larry Dixon | Ron Capps | Allen Johnson | N/A |
| June 4–7 | United Association Route 66 NHRA Nationals | Chicago, Ill. | Spencer Massey | Tony Pedregon | Jeg Coughlin | Matt Guidera |
| June 11–14 | United Association NHRA SuperNationals | Englishtown, N.J. | Larry Dixon | Tony Pedregon | Jeg Coughlin | Craig Treble |
| June 25–28 | Summit Racing Equipment NHRA Nationals | Norwalk, Ohio | Larry Dixon | Jack Beckman | Jason Line | Andrew Hines |
| July 10–12 | Mopar Mile-High NHRA Nationals | Denver, Colo. | Antron Brown | Ron Capps | Allen Johnson | Eddie Krawiec |
| July 17–19 | NHRA Northwest Nationals | Seattle, Wash. | Antron Brown | Tim Wilkerson | Mike Edwards | N/A |
| July 24–26 | Fram Autolite NHRA Nationals | Sonoma, Calif. | Antron Brown | Tim Wilkerson | Jason Line | Andrew Hines |
| August 13–16 | Lucas Oil NHRA Nationals | Brainerd, Minn. | Morgan Lucas | Tony Pedregon | Greg Anderson | Hector Arana |
| August 20–23 | Toyo Tires NHRA Nationals | Reading, Pa. | Larry Dixon | Bob Tasca III | Jeg Coughlin | Eddie Krawiec |
| September 2–7 | Mac Tools U.S. Nationals | Indianapolis, Ind. | Tony Schumacher | Ashley Force Hood | Jeg Coughlin | Hector Arana |
2009 Countdown to the Championship
| September 17–20 | NHRA Carolinas Nationals | Concord, N.C. | Cory McClenathan | Robert Hight | Mike Edwards | Hector Arana |
| September 24–27 | O'Reilly Super Start Batteries NHRA Fall Nationals | Dallas, Texas | Tony Schumacher | Robert Hight | Greg Anderson | Hector Arana |
| October 2–4 | O'Reilly NHRA Mid-South Nationals | Memphis, Tenn. | Morgan Lucas | Jeff Arend | Jason Line | Michael Phillips |
| October 9–11 | Virginia NHRA Nationals | Richmond, Va. | Brandon Bernstein | Del Worsham | Mike Edwards | N/A |
| October 29 – November 1 | NHRA Las Vegas Nationals | Las Vegas, Nev. | Spencer Massey | Robert Hight | Larry Morgan | Andrew Hines |
| November 12–15 | Automobile Club of Southern California NHRA Finals | Pomona, California | Antron Brown | Mike Neff | Greg Anderson | Eddie Krawiec |

== Points standings ==
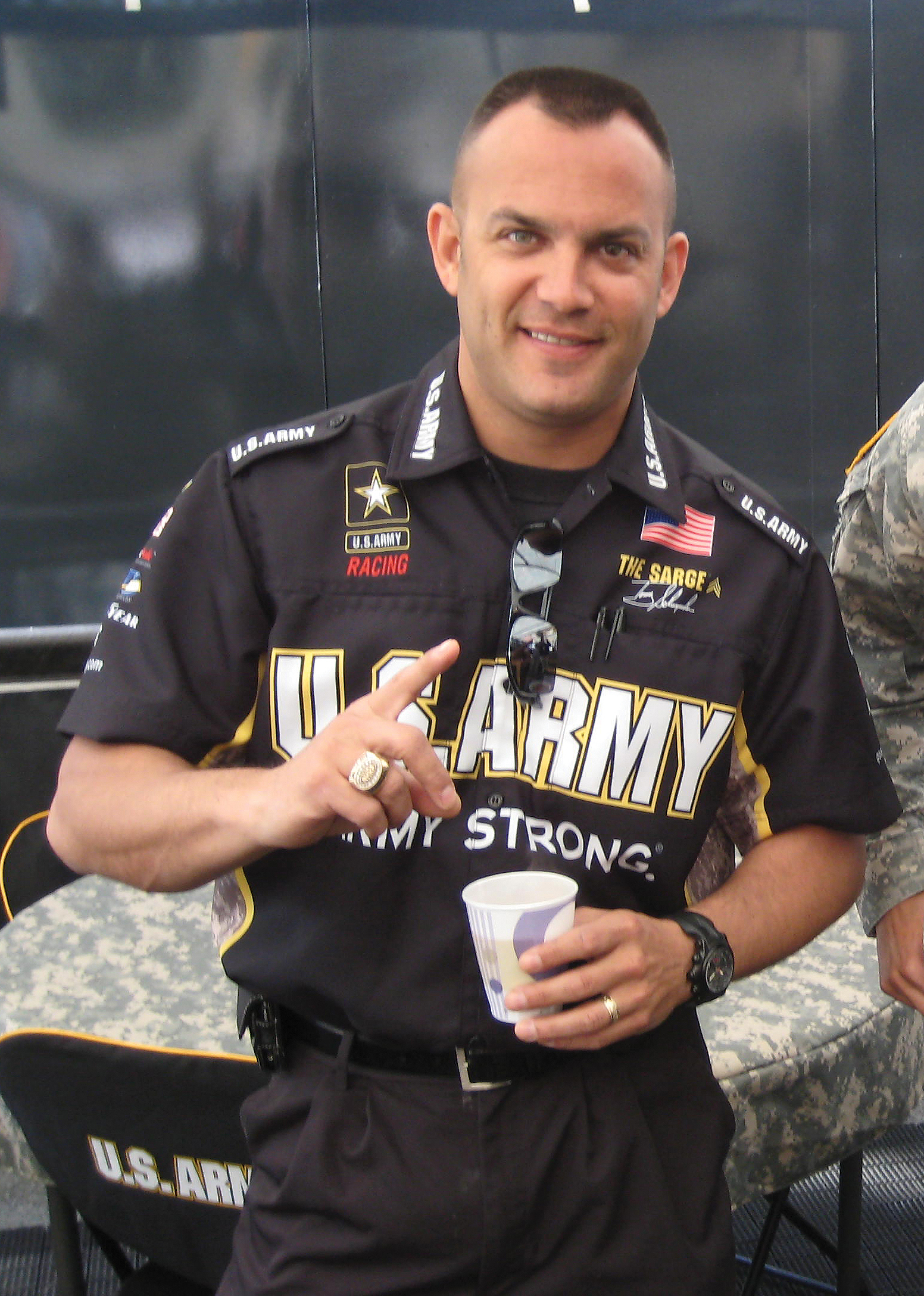
Tony Schumacher in April, 2009.

Top Fuel
| Position | Driver | Points | Points Back | Chassis |
|---|---|---|---|---|
| 1 | **Tony Schumacher** | 2571 | - | Hadman |
| 2 | Larry Dixon | 2569 | -2 | Hadman |
| 3 | Antron Brown | 2522 | -49 | Hadman |
| 4 | Cory McClenathan | 2490 | -81 | Hadman |
| 5 | Brandon Bernstein | 2438 | -133 | Hadman |
| 6 | Spencer Massey | 2437 | -134 | Dragster |
| 7 | Morgan Lucas | 2353 | -218 | Hadman |
| 8 | Doug Kalitta | 2325 | -246 | Attac |
| 9 | Shawn Langdon | 2299 | -272 | Hadman |
| 10 | Clay Millican | 2093 | -478 | Hadman |

Funny Car
| Position | Driver | Points | Points Back | Make |
|---|---|---|---|---|
| 1 | **Robert Hight** | 2547 | - | Mustang |
| 2 | Ashley Force Hood | 2481 | -66 | Mustang |
| 3 | Ron Capps | 2433 | -138 | Charger |
| 4 | Tim Wilkerson | 2430 | -141 | Mustang |
| 5 | Jack Beckman | 2406 | -141 | Charger |
| 6 | Tony Pedregon | 2403 | -144 | Impala |
| 7 | Del Worsham | 2362 | -195 | Solara |
| 8 | Bob Tasca III | 2326 | -221 | Mustang |
| 9 | John Force | 2268 | -279 | Mustang |
| 10 | Mike Neff | 2235 | -312 | Mustang |

Pro Stock
| Position | Driver | Points | Points Back | Make |
|---|---|---|---|---|
| 1 | **Mike Edwards** | 2682 | - | GXP |
| 2 | Greg Anderson | 2572 | -110 | GXP |
| 3 | Jason Line | 2486 | -196 | GXP |
| 4 | Greg Stanfield | 2403 | -279 | GXP |
| 5 | Jeg Coughlin Jr. | 2375 | -307 | Cobalt |
| 6 | Ron Krisher | 2363 | -319 | Cobalt |
| 7 | Allen Johnson | 2334 | -348 | Stratus* |
| 8 | Kurt Johnson | 2307 | -375 | Cobalt |
| 9 | Johnny Gray | 2300 | -382 | Stratus* |
| 10 | Richard Jones | 2142 | -540 | Stratus* |

Pro Stock Motorcycle
| Position | Driver | Points | Points Back | Make |
|---|---|---|---|---|
| 1 | **Hector Arana** | 2590 | - | Buell |
| 2 | Ed Krawiec | 2588 | -2 | Harley-Davidson |
| 3 | Andrew Hines | 2466 | -144 | Harley-Davidson |
| 4 | Matt Smith | 2369 | -221 | Suzuki |
| 5 | Douglas Horne | 2362 | -228 | Buell |
| 6 | Michael Phillips | 2321 | -269 | Suzuki |
| 7 | Karen Stoffer | 2249 | -341 | Suzuki |
| 8 | Shawn Gann | 2248 | -342 | Buell |
| 9 | Craig Treble | 2202 | -388 | Suzuki |
| 10 | Matt Guidera | 2020 | -570 | Buell |

- Drivers in **bold** have clinched the championship

Mike Edwards last won a title in 1981 (Modified Class), the longest gap in NHRA history.

The teams running a Dodge Stratus have been notified by the NHRA that body style, because of it is out of production for the past five years, will be illegal in 2010. Dodge teams must run the Avenger in 2010. Pro Stock Cars may be any approved car (Mustang, Cobalt, Avenger, GXP, GTO) from the past five years.
