= Ashley Force Hood =

American NHRA drag racer

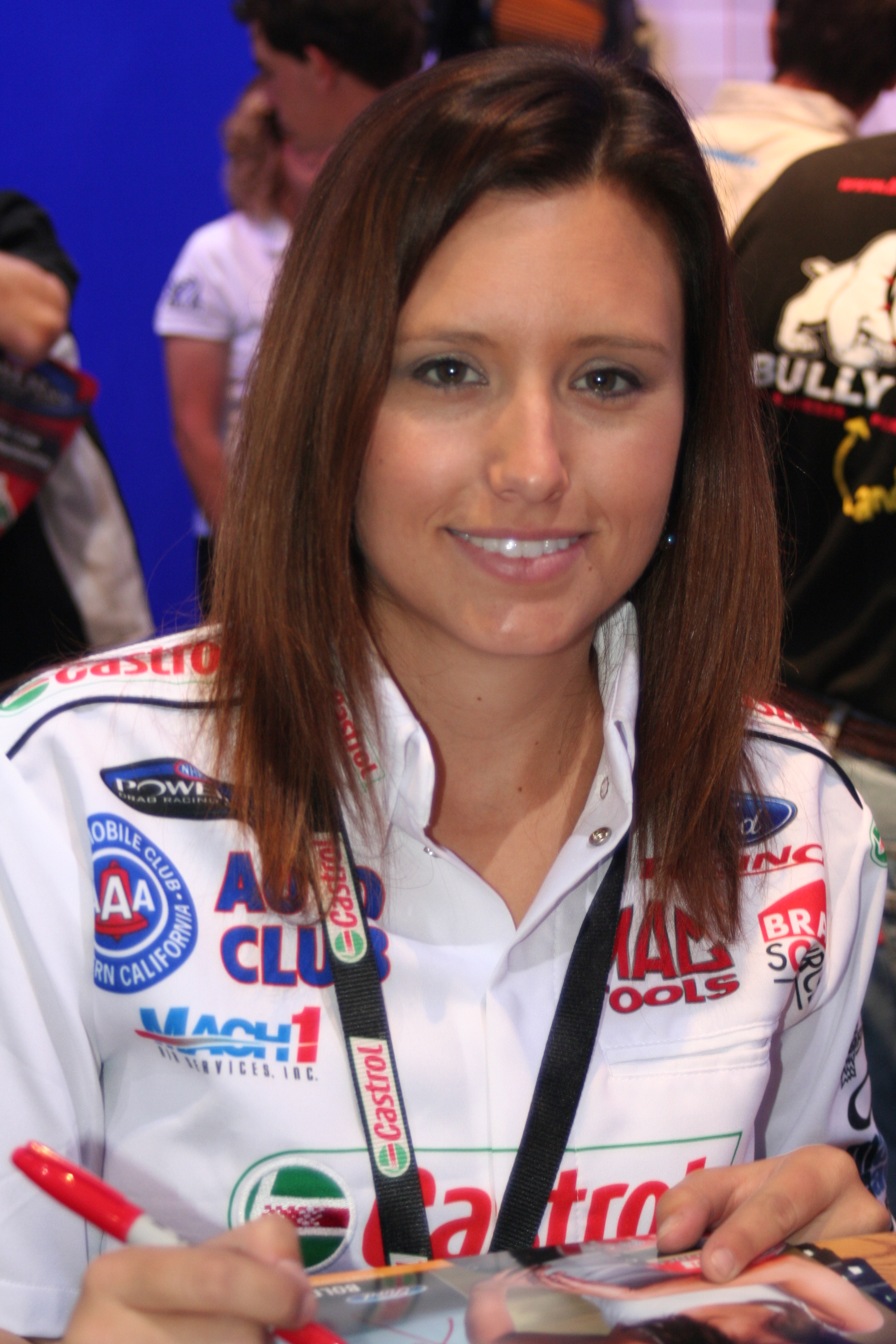
- Force at SEMA in 2007
- Born: Ashley Corinne Force; November 29, 1982 (age 43) Yorba Linda, California, U.S.
- Retired: 2011
- Relatives: John Force (father); Laurie Force (mother); Daniel Hood (husband); Adria Hight (sister); Courtney Force (sister); Brittany Force (sister); Robert Hight (ex brother-in-law); Graham Rahal (brother-in-law); Autumn Hight (niece); Jacob and Noah Hood (sons); Harlan Rahal (niece); Tinley Rahal (niece)

National Hot Rod Association
- Years active: 2007–2010
- Teams: John Force Racing
- Wins: 4

Awards
- 2007: Auto Club Road to the Future Award

Ashley Corinne Force Hood (born November 29, 1982) is an American former NHRA Funny Car drag racer for John Force Racing. She is the daughter of 16-time NHRA Top Fuel Funny Car national champion John Force and Laurie Force. She is married to Daniel Hood, who works for John Force Racing. She was on hiatus from racing in 2011 as the couple expected their first child. Since their child's birth, Force Hood has announced her retirement from competitive racing.

Force was selected as the NHRA POWERade Drag Racing Series' Rookie of the Year (Funny Car division) in November 2007. On April 27, 2008, Force earned her first NHRA Professional-category win, defeating her father in the final round at the NHRA Summit Southern Nationals held at the Atlanta Dragway in Commerce, Georgia, becoming the first woman to earn a win in TF/FC.

== Drag racing career ==
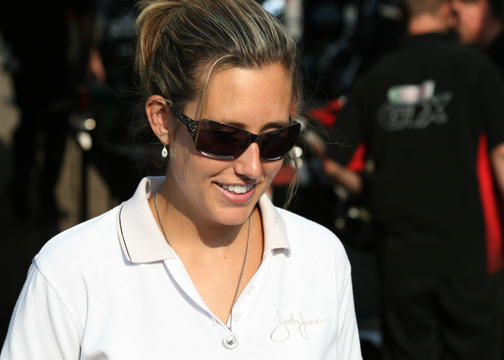
Force in August 2007

As a Top Alcohol Dragster rookie in 2004, Force won three of the season's final five races, including the 50th annual Mac Tools U.S. Nationals at Indianapolis, and the season-ending Automobile Club of Southern California event at Pomona, where she shared the winners' circle with her father—NHRA's first father-daughter winners. She finished the year fourth in national driver points.

=== 2007 ===
In 2007, Force moved into the Professional ranks, driving a Castrol-sponsored Mustang Top Fuel Funny Car for her father's team, John Force Racing.

Force and her father made NHRA history in Atlanta in April when they became the first father and daughter to race each other. She won the round with an elapsed time of 4.779 seconds, and a top speed of 317.05 mph (510.24 km/h). She advanced to the semifinals, which tied her for the best ever Funny Car event finish for a female.

In October 2007, at The Strip at Las Vegas Motor Speedway, Force became the first female to compete in a national series TF/FC final round, but was defeated on a holeshot by Tony Pedregon.

=== 2008 ===
Force's funny car in 2008

Early in the 2008 racing season, Force worked her way to the final round of eliminations in three consecutive meetings: Houston, Las Vegas, and Atlanta. She made her first final round appearance of the year on March 30 at Houston, but lost to Del Worsham. At Las Vegas, she was defeated in the final by Tim Wilkerson, yet became the first female racer ever to lead the NHRA Funny Car point standings. On April 27, 2008, at Atlanta, Force's opponent in the final was her father, John, who was seeking to score the 1000th round win of his career. The younger Force claimed her first-ever NHRA Funny Car win that day, the first for a woman, with a 4.837-second elapsed time, the second quickest of the weekend in the Funny Car class.

=== 2009 ===
Force garnered the second event win of her career on March 29, 2009, at the O'Reilly NHRA Spring Nationals; in the finals she beat her former instructor Jack Beckman.

Beckman beat Force in the first round of eliminations at the next race at Las Vegas. She then gathered her fourth career #1 qualifier at the Southern Nationals, in which Beckman beating Force in the final. Force compiled her fifth career #1 qualifier at the Thunder Valley Nationals

At the U.S. Nationals, Force beat teammate Robert Hight to earn her the distinction of not only being the first female Funny Car driver to win at Indianapolis, but the first female driver to win in two different classes. She finished the 2009 season 2nd in points, becoming the highest women finisher in Funny Car history.

=== 2011 ===
On January 25, during a John Force Racing press conference, it was announced Force Hood would become the President of John Force Entertainment, a subsidiary of John Force Racing which will focus on development of media projects and products. At the same press conference, Force-Hood announced she and her husband were expecting their first child in August, and she would be on hiatus for the season. John Force would drive her Castrol GTX Ford in competitions for the 2011 season. Mike Neff, a former driver who assumed the duties of Force's crew chief following the sudden departure of veteran crew chief Austin Coil, will take over driving the Castrol GTX High Mileage Ford for Force, while sister Courtney became a fourth driver in the Traxxas Ford Mustang.

=== 2012 ===
On January 28, Force Hood assumed the title of President for John Force Entertainment, but has not declared her career as a driver over

=== 2014 ===
Force Hood did test driving for John Force Racing, driving her sister Courtney's Funny Car in a testing session at Las Vegas Motor Speedway. The testing allowed her to renew her NHRA Funny Car licence, which expired at the end of the 2012 season. Her renewal of the Funny Car license allows her to test or be a reserve driver if the necessity arrives.

== Television ==
Force was featured with her family on A&E's reality show Driving Force, which aired from July 2006 to May 2007. The series followed the daily lives of NHRA champion John Force, his wife Laurie, and their daughters Ashley, Brittany, and Courtney, highlighting their careers in drag racing.

== Personal life ==
Force Hood has two sisters, Courtney and Brittany, and an older half-sister, Adria. On December 13, 2008, Ashley married the parts manager of the Castrol GTX Funny Car team, Daniel Hood, in Lake Tahoe and now goes by Ashley Force Hood. On August 18, 2011, Force and Hood had their first son, Jacob John Hood.

Force attended Esperanza High School in Anaheim, CA, where she was a cheerleader. In 2003, Force graduated from California State University, Fullerton (CSUF) with a B.A. in communications with an emphasis in television and video. In 2007, she was voted as the Hottest Athlete by an AOL Sports Poll, beating out favorites Tom Brady and Danica Patrick.

Force Hood and her husband are owners of two American Bobtail cats, Simba and Gizmo, featured on Animal Planet's Cats 101 on September 18, 2010.

Force Hood is now a director and owns her own production studio John Force Entertainment. She can be found on YouTube and she makes a new video every week for her fans.
