= Driving Force (TV series) =

American reality television series

- Genre: Reality
- Directed by: Guido Verweyen
- Starring: John Force; Laurie Force; Ashley Force; Brittany Force; Courtney Force
- Theme music composer: Wolfmother
- Opening theme: "Woman"
- Country of origin: United States
- Original language: English
- No. of seasons: 2
- No. of episodes: 24

Production
- Cinematography: Guido Verweyen; Bryan Donnell
- Running time: 22–26 minutes
- Production company: A&E

Original release
- Network: A&E
- Release: July 17, 2006 – May 15, 2007

Driving Force is an American reality television program which premiered July 17, 2006, on A&E, and ended on May 15, 2007. It was centered on champion drag racer John Force and his daughters, also drag racers.

== Synopsis ==
The show stars John Force, a driver in the National Hot Rod Association (NHRA), along with his family: daughters Ashley Force, Brittany Force, and Courtney Force, and wife, Laurie.

The show's theme song is "Woman" by Australian band Wolfmother.

== Revival ==
At a press conference on September 12, 2013 in Charlotte, North Carolina, John Force announced the hiring of JMI, Octagon, and Rogers & Cowan Marketing and Entertainment Companies to help rebrand John Force Racing after losing Castrol and Ford as sponsors after the 2014 NHRA Season. Part of the rebranding effort will include a revival of Driving Force, though under a different name, and focusing more on Courtney and Brittany than the previous iteration of the show.
