= John Force =

American NHRA drag racer (born 1949)

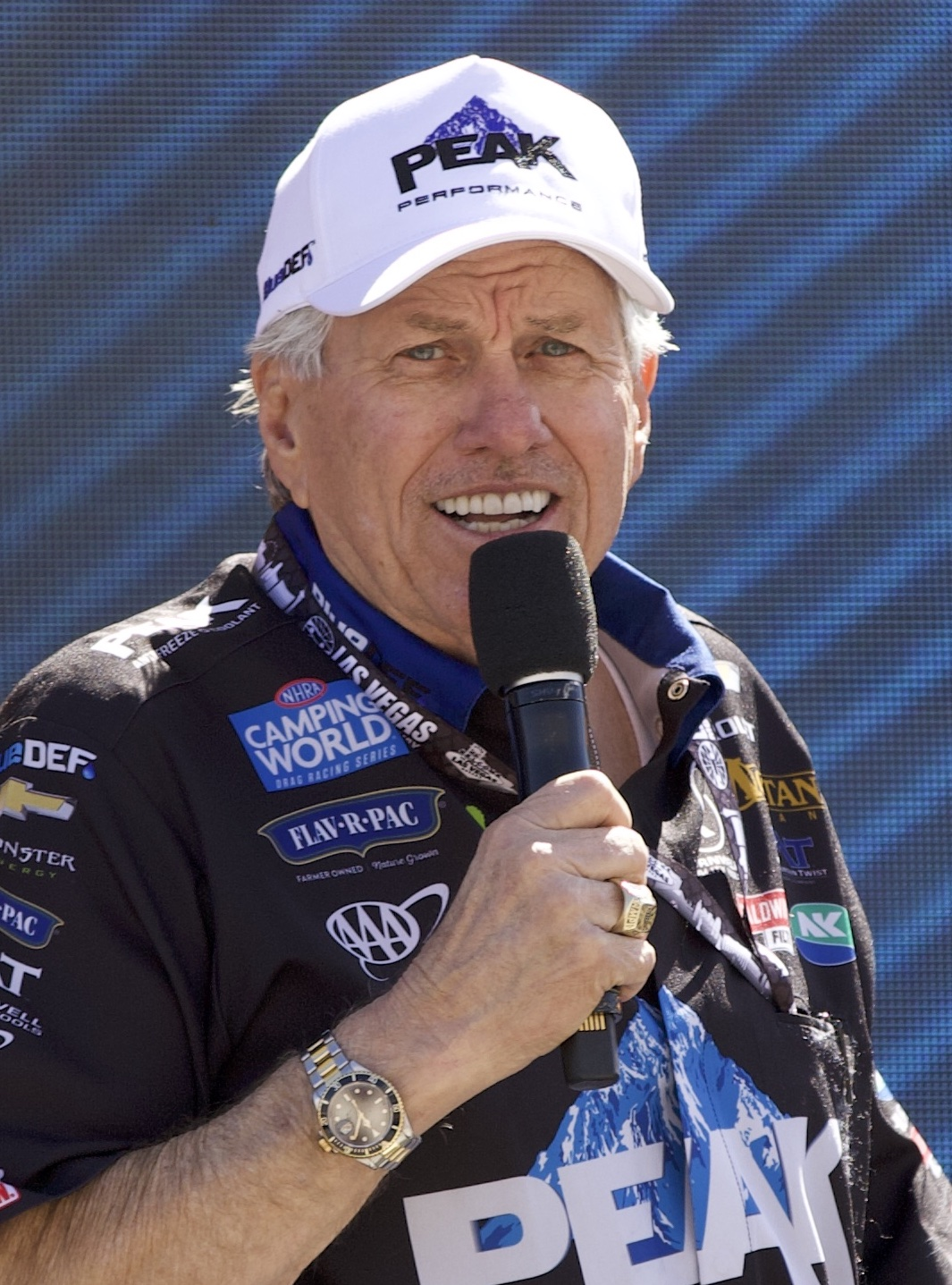
- Force at Las Vegas Motor Speedway in 2024
- Born: John Harold Force; May 4, 1949 (age 77) Bell Gardens, California, U.S.
- Relatives: Laurie Force (wife); Ashley Force Hood (daughter); Brittany Force (daughter); Courtney Force (daughter); Robert Hight (ex son-in-law); Graham Rahal (son-in-law)

NHRA Mission Foods Drag Racing Series career
- Current team: John Force Racing
- Years active: 1978–2024 (driver); 1996-present (owner)
- Championships: 16 (FC)
- Wins: 157 (FC)
- Poles: 167
- Fastest laps: Best ET; 3.820 seconds; Best Speed; 337.33 mph (542.88 km/h)

Previous series
- AHRA

Championship titles
- 1990, 1991, 1993, 1994, 1995, 1996, 1997, 1998, 1999, 2000, 2001, 2002, 2004, 2006, 2010, 2013: 16 NHRA Championships (see left); 1 AHRA Championship (1984)

Awards
- 2008: Motorsports Hall of Fame of America
- Statistics up to date as of September 17, 2025.

John Harold Force (born May 4, 1949) is an American retired NHRA drag racer. He is a 16-time NHRA and one-time AHRA Funny Car champion driver and a 24-time champion car owner. Force owns and was a driver for his own team John Force Racing (JFR). He is one of the most dominant drag racers in the sport with 157 career victories as a driver. He graduated from Bell Gardens High School and briefly attended Cerritos Junior College to play football. He is the father of drag racers Ashley Force Hood, Brittany Force, and Courtney Force. His oldest daughter Adria Hight is the CFO of JFR.

Current drivers racing for Force's team are Josh Hart, Jack Beckman, Jordan Vandergriff, and Alexis DeJoria . Mike Neff was crew chief for John two separate times. Effective July 2013 Jimmy Prock replaced Mike Neff as crew chief, and Mike Neff became crew chief for Robert Hight. Neff, who was once the crew chief for rival driver Gary Scelzi, raced in a 4th Funny Car for JFR from October 26, 2007, following the death of Eric Medlen, until the end of the 2009 season. However, in 2010, after a 2009 season in which Force did not win a single race, Force parked his 4th car, and named Neff as his new crew chief instead. This decision resulted in Force winning his 15th NHRA Championship. His nickname among several of the drivers, as well as several announcers within the sport of drag racing is "Brute Force", a nickname he earned by his dominating wins during his run of ten straight NHRA championships. Other common nicknames include “Force to be Reckoned With” and “Force of Nature”. Force, his daughters, Courtney, Ashley, and Brittany, granddaughter Autumn Hight and her father Robert Hight are collectively known as "The First Family of Drag Racing".

== Early life ==
Force was born to Harold and Betty Ruth Force in the Los Angeles suburb of Bell Gardens, California. As a child he lived in logging camps, Indian reservations, migrant farms, and trailer parks. He survived childhood polio with therapy and perseverance of his mother and family. He played football in high school and attended Cerritos College. John is one of six children. John has five siblings, Walker, Louie, Tom (now deceased), and Cindy Hem (married to late husband Skip Hem) were all older than John. Dana (Baby Force) Marino is ten years younger than John. Walker and Cindy still live near John in Southern California. Walker Force and Louie Force have worked with John over the years, but Walker Force is the only sibling now working at JFR. Younger sister Dana (Marino) did not grow up in the same house or spend any time with the family in the early years of the Force Family Racing activities.

== 1978–2004 ==
In 1971, Force drove the Jack Chrisman-built Night Stalker Mustang, his first funny car. Early in his career, he drove a Corvette, a Monza and then in the 1980s switched to an Oldsmobile Cutlass through the end of the 1993 season. He drove a Chevrolet for 1994, quickly changing to a Pontiac in 1995 and 1996. Force was a Ford driver and team owner from 1997 until 2014, when he returned to Chevrolet.

1985-Travel back in time to an era when John Force was trying to find his place in a drag racing world in Spokane, Wash., at the ADRA World Finals in the latter years of the old American Hot Rod Association. It was part of the syndicated Pro Drag Superstars series. Both Johnny West and John Force were tied at 1650 Points. John Force beat Johnny West in the finals with a time of 5.87 seconds at 252.10 miles per hour 1/4 mile run in the Coca-Cola Wendy's Funny Car. https://www.youtube.com/watch?v=SW-6Jk_gTgk

Force's Castrol GTX funny car at Heartland Park Topeka in 1995

Between 1987 and 1996, Force won sixty-seven of 203 NHRA national events, four of nine Big Bud Shootouts, and six World Championships. In 1996, with Austin Coil tuning, Force went to the final round in sixteen of nineteen national events, taking thirteen wins, one of the best records ever in Funny Car history. His domination would continue, with ten NHRA FC World Championship wins from 1993 to 2002, including six straight 1997-2002; his success was so amazing, he was accused of cheating (and was willing to strip off his firesuit to prove he was not). Between 1997 and 2006, Force went to the final in 105 of 228 events and took sixty-one tour wins. On top of that, he had ten of the quickest or fastest passes in Funny Car.

In 1992, the honor of putting Force on the trailer would go to Cruz Pedregon, driving the Larry Minor McDonald's-sponsored Olds to the championship.

Force's points finishes were 23rd, 8th, 26th, 16th, 20th, 4th, 13th, and 5th from 1978 to 1985. Force then had Castrol Motor Oil jump on as his main sponsor, and was even more successful. From 1986 to 1995, he finished 4th, 4th, 6th, 1st, 1st, 2nd, 1st, 1st, and 1st. He then had fellow driver and arch-rival Cruz Pedregon's younger brother, Tony, come aboard to drive John's 2nd car. From 1996 to 2000, John finished 1st all 5 years. In 2001, John had longtime friend and fellow drag racer Gary Densham drive a third car. In that same year, John once again finished as the champion, which he followed up with an astronomical 10th straight world title in 2002. In 2003, for the 1st time since 1992, John didn't win the title. It was not all lost however, because teammate Tony Pedregon won his 1st world title. At the end of the season, Tony Pedregon went on to join brother Cruz in their own racing organization, and Gary Densham went on to race independently. John found quick and personal talent in two young-guns. Eric Medlen, son of long-time JFR crewmember John Medlen, came on to race. John's other driver, Robert Hight, was his son-in-law and crewmember. Both had a lot of success in their season, but John topped both in 2004 with a 13th world title.

In 2000, Force was sponsored by BP's Castrol brand, continuing the relationship between Force and Castrol that began in 1985 and lasted through 2014. After winning his fourth Funny Car title in 1994, Force earned the nickname of "Brute Force" from drivers, and even announcers such as Steve Evans. This nickname hearkens back to his early days on the track, when he drove his own unsponsored car, named "Brute Force". Force guest starred as himself in a 2004 episode of King of the Hill ("Dale Be Not Proud"), in which Dale Gribble donates a kidney to Force, after which it appears he does not need it.

== 2005 ==
In 2005, Force won 5 events, but only finished third in the championship standings, 32 points behind champion Gary Scelzi, and 24 points behind Ron Capps, both of Don Schumacher Racing [DSR].

== 2006 ==
In 2006, Force won his 14th NHRA World Funny Car Championship, defeating Capps in the quarter-finals of the Automobile Club of Southern California NHRA Finals which mathematically eliminated Capps and teammate Robert Hight from the championship. Force went on to win the event, his third of the season and 122nd of his career.

== 2007 ==
John Force Racing shop

After the death of Eric Medlen, and John Force's crash in Ennis, Texas at the 2007 O'Reilly NHRA Fall Nationals, Force started 2007 poorly, suffering a DNQ ending a 20+ year consecutive qualifying streak. He rebounded, winning the O'Reilly NHRA Thunder Valley Nationals in Bristol, Tennessee, then proceeded on to three more final rounds, winning another race in Sonoma, California, putting him fourth in points and allowing him to make the first cut in NHRA's new point system, the Countdown to the Championship aka the "Countdown to Eight". He stumbled again in the next two races but, again, rebounded until his crash.

On September 23, 2007, Force was injured in a crash at the O'Reilly Auto Parts Fall Nationals in Ennis, Texas as he crossed the finish line against Kenny Bernstein. Bernstein's Funny Car drifted into Force's lane, clipping the final timing cone and a foam block which shot into Force's lane. Initially, it was thought that the block ruptured Force's left rear tire, causing it to come apart, violently shaking the chassis until it broke apart. However, it was determined by NHRA after a thorough review, that the block went behind Force's tire and was not the cause of the wreck. Injuries sustained were a broken ankle, abrasion of his right knee, a dislocated left wrist, and badly mangled fingers and toes, and Force had to be airlifted to Baylor University Medical Center in Dallas. Phil Burkart Jr. was added as Force's replacement for the remainder of the 2007 season, starting at Las Vegas.

== 2008 ==
2008 was a subpar season for Force who finished seventh, out of the top five for the first time since early in his career. However, after the death of driver Scott Kalitta, he was instrumental in the development of some of the safety precautions that were implemented throughout the rest of the season, and along with retired six-time world champion Kenny Bernstein [4 Funny Car titles, 2 Top Fuel titles] and seven-time Top Fuel champion Tony Schumacher, with backing from NHRA's Track Safety Committee, assisted in developing a sensor that monitors the engines of Top Fuel dragsters and Funny Cars. Should the engine backfire at any time during a race, the fuel pump is automatically shut down, and the parachutes are deployed. The idea was to either minimize or eliminate the circumstances that led to Kalitta's death. This safety device became mandatory and was put into place at the start of the 2009 season. Also, a brake handle that, instead of needing to be pulled back toward the driver, was set up to be pushed away from the driver was made an optional setting for the Funny Car division. This change happened because when the 2008 season began, Force's right arm was still in a cast, due to broken fingers, and he needed a different way of using the brakes on the car, rather than the traditional handbrake that needed to be brought back toward the driver; also, in the 2007 accident in Texas, Force had lost some grip in his right hand, and had some problems putting enough pressure on the handbrake to unlock it from position to apply the brakes. This led to the development of the forward application handbrake, which has given several drivers in the Funny Car class quicker access to the brakes. Though Force only finished seventh in the points in 2008, he became influential within the NHRA for innovations in driver safety.

== 2009 ==
2009 once again saw Force finish outside of the top-five. John finished ninth, daughter Ashley finished second, and Mike Neff placing tenth. However, he would win his 16th overall championship as a car owner, with teammate Robert Hight's championship, placing Force as the winningest car owner in NHRA history.

== 2010 ==
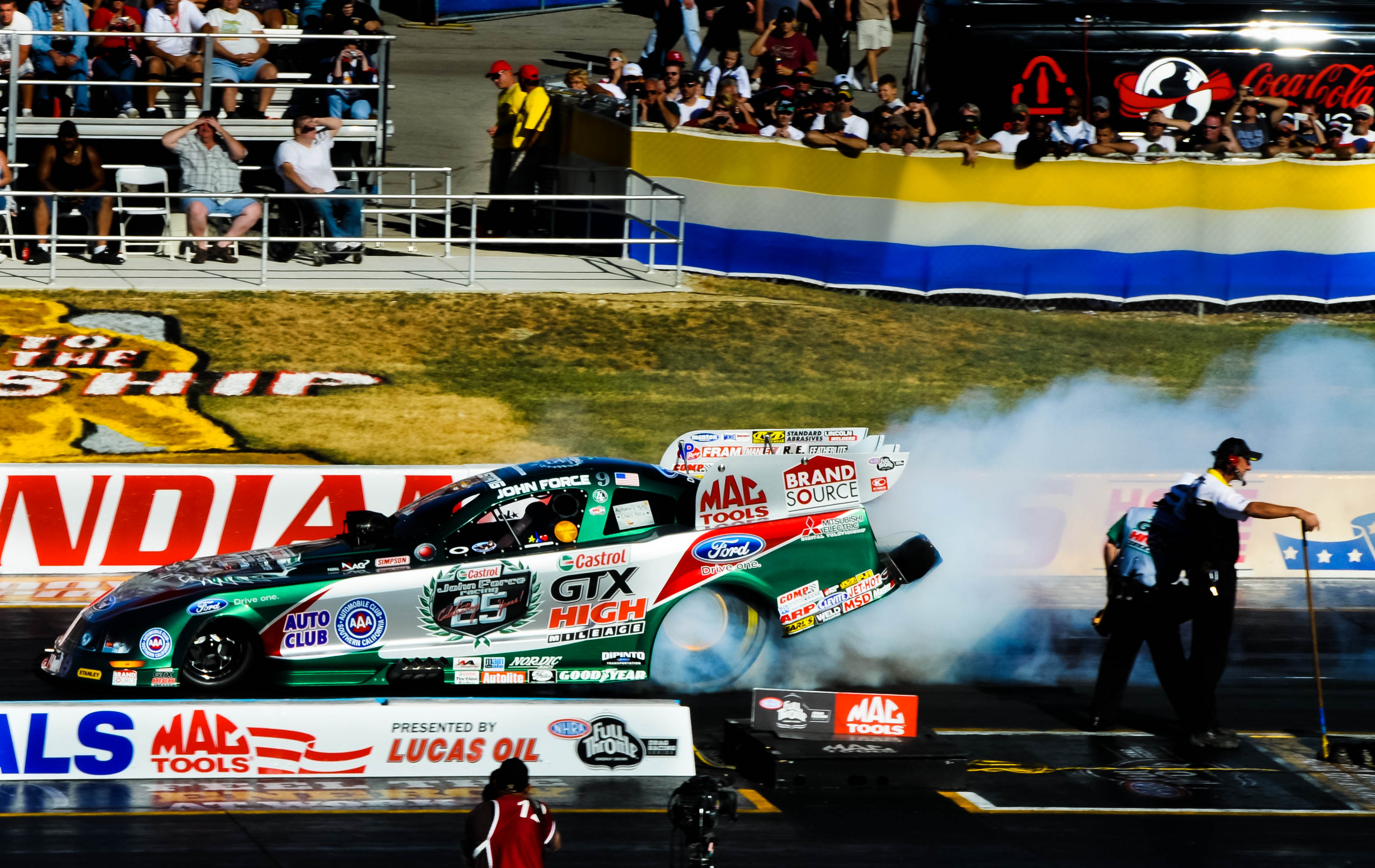
Force at the 2010 U.S. Nationals

The start of the 2010 season saw Force celebrate 25 years with the same sponsor, as well as 34 years in the NHRA. On February 14, Force won the season opener at Auto Club Raceway at Pomona in the 50th Winternationals in California defeating Ron Capps. After 13 events, Force had four wins, and lead the Funny Car points standings with 933, 58 ahead of teammate Robert Hight.

Going into the Auto Club of Southern California Finals in Pomona, CA on November 14, 2010, Force needed some help to win the championship. He started the day 38 points behind 28-year-old Matt Hagan, who ran for team rival Don Schumacher and his team. In order to capture the championship he needed to finish two rounds ahead of Hagan. With Bob Tasca III taking Hagan out in the first round, Force won his first round over Gary Densham and second-round win over Bob Bode, securing the championship. He then went on to victory beating Melanie Troxel in the semi-finals and in the final, defeated Jeff Arend. John Force now has the distinction of being the oldest NHRA champion in history. Long-time crew chief Austin Coil resigned from John Force Racing on November 16, 2010.

== 2011 ==
As of February 7, 2011, JFR has already flip-flopped cars between John, Robert, Ashley, and Mike. Ashley Force Hood announced that she was expecting her first child, and would sit out the 2011 Full Throttle Drag Racing Season. John Force would drive Force Hood's new Ford Mustang with Dean Antonelli and Ron Douglas tuning, sponsored by Castrol Motor Oil. Robert Hight will remain in the Auto Club of Southern California Ford Mustang. Mike Neff, after co-crew chiefing John Force's car with Austin Coil, will drive Force's car from John's 2010 championship season. Neff's Ford Mustang will be sponsored by Castrol Oil. As of February 7, 2011, JFR started testing for the 2011 season. Out of the 11 testers so far, Force is 1st, Hight was 5th, and Neff was 6th. As of July 31, Force is 7th in the points standings, while teammate Mike Neff is leading, and Robert Hight is in second.

== 2012 ==
2012 saw John welcome a fourth driver to his stable, former Top Alcohol Dragster champion, and daughter Courtney, who was in the running for the Auto Club Rookie of the Year Award, she will be driving the Traxxas Ford Mustang in her rookie season, and she has done something that only sister Ashley has done, beat her father in the first meeting between the two, taking John out of the Arizona Nationals in Phoenix in just the first round. Although Force was unable to retain the championship, finishing in fifth, he saw Courtney win something he never did, the NHRA Road to the Future Rookie of the Year award, and Courtney's second-place finish in the season helped cement John Force Racing's legacy for several years to come.

== 2013 ==
During the start of the 2013 season, Ashley announced her retirement from full-time competition, this left the Force team short a driver. Rather than find another driver to take Ashley's place within the Castrol GTX Funny Car, John did something he had never done before, field a Top Fuel car, with daughter Brittany behind the wheel. On July 26, 2013 it was announced that after the 2014 racing season Ford Motor Company would no longer be a part of John Force Racing. It was also announced that after the 2014 racing season, primary sponsor Castrol would be leaving JFR after a 29-year business relationship

During the penultimate race of the 2013 season, Force beat his daughter Courtney in the final round to win the race and his 16th NHRA Funny Car Championship.

== 2014 ==
He won at the season opener in Pomona California as well wins in Norwalk Ohio & Seattle Washington as he would finish second points.

== 2015 ==
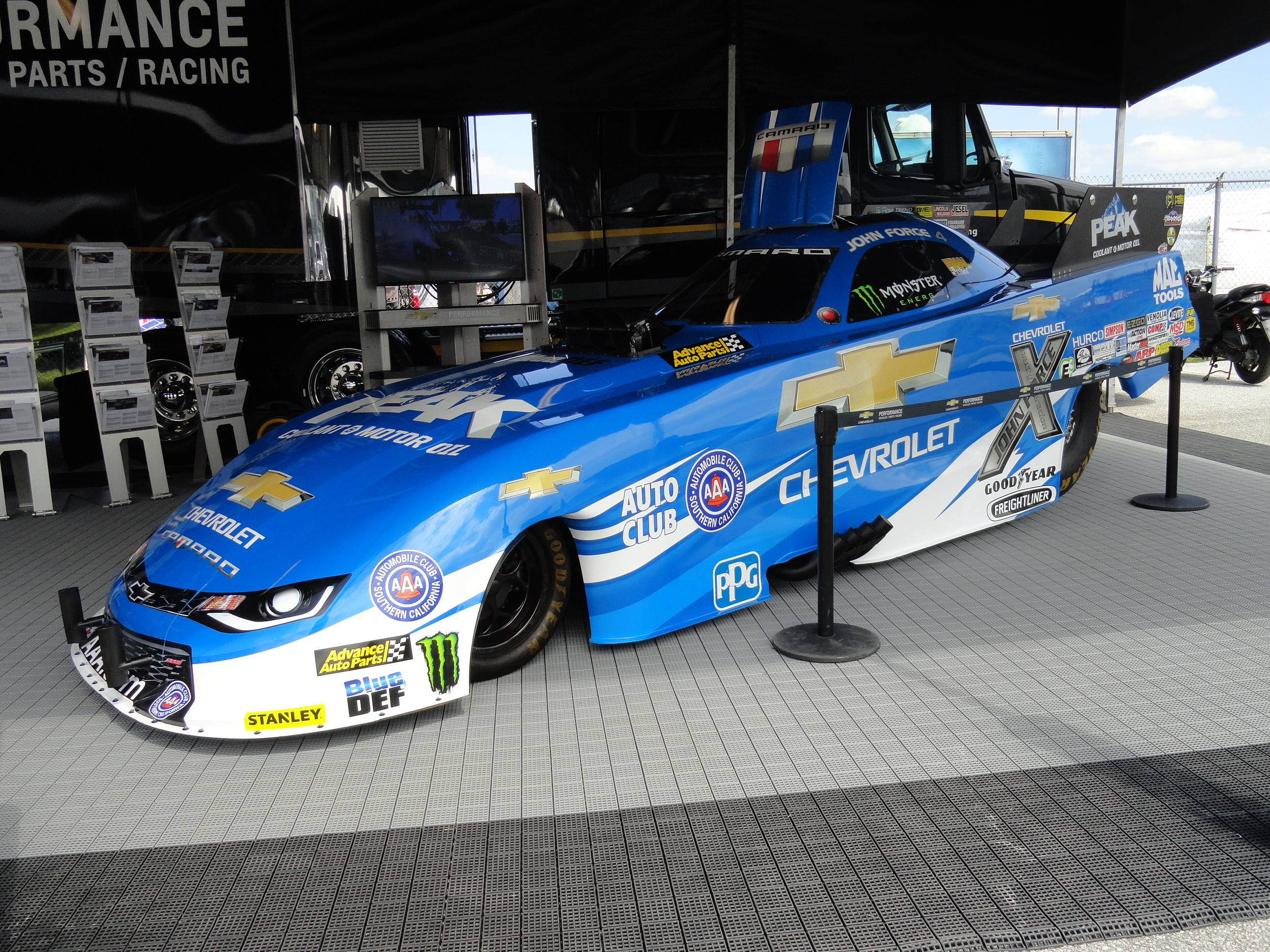
John Force Peak Chevrolet Funny Car

In 2015, John announced a partnership with Chevrolet. He competed in the 2015 racing season with a new sponsorship deal from Peak Antifreeze.

== 2016 ==
Debuted the new Chevrolet Camaro SS body in May at the Kansas Nationals in Topeka Kansas. John won four races during the 2016 season at The Mile High Nationals at Bandimere Colorado, The Sonoma Nationals in Sonoma California, The Toyota Nationals in LasVegas Nevada and The Carolina Nationals in Charlotte NC. Finished the season fourth in Funny Car Championship points.

== 2017 ==
John's daughter Brittany & Robert Hight both won the championship in Top Fuel & Funny Car respectively. Advance Auto Parts joined team, sponsoring Courtney Force and rest of JFR teams.

== 2018 ==
Won at the Denver event for his only win of the season.

== 2019 ==
On August 4, 2019, John Force won his 150th race at the Magic Dry Organic Absorbent NHRA Northwest Nationals in Seattle, Washington, edging out Ron Capps and breaking a 25 race winless streak, having last won in Colorado the year prior, also against Capps. John expressed extreme relief after winning, his first words to the camera being obscenities (which NHRA had to censor, as the broadcast was on network television). Force was not present in the winners' circle, having ridden his pitbike to the stands to watch Austin Prock, a driver on his Top Fuel team and son of a Force Racing mechanic, win his first race and was still celebrating with fans while Prock was being interviewed.

Force further celebrated the 2019 season by winning the U. S. Nationals.

Daughter Courtney Force retired from driving.

== 2020 ==
He was the runner-up at the season opener in Pomona California but after 2 events him & his teams didn't run again in the 2020 season due to the COVID-19 pandemic but would return in the following year.

== 2021 ==
In his return after missing most of the previous year because of the COVID-19 pandemic he won 3 events. He won at the Charlotte 4 Wide, Epping, & Topeka events. At Dallas for the first time since 2018 John Force was set on fire in a crash that echoed his win in 1996 where his Castrol car caught fire at this track.

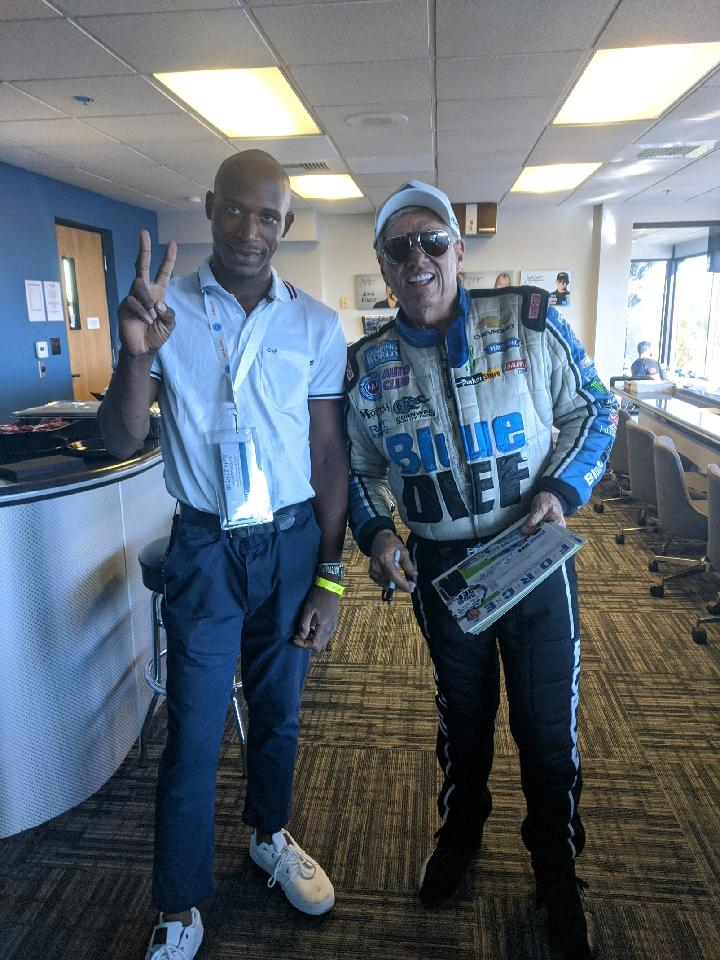
John Force & NHRA Coin creator Joshua Dixon at the 2021 Winternationals

== 2022 ==
He gained a win of the season at the 4-Wide Nationals in Charlotte, NC.

== 2023 ==
Force had a pair of runner-up finishes & finished in the Top 10 in points once again.

== 2024 ==
He won the Saturday Final at the Arizona Nationals in Chandler, AZ. The race was originally part of the Lucas Oil Winternationals in Pomona, CA that was abandoned after the semifinals, resulting in a double finals situation at Firebird Motorsports Park. Force won the first final on Saturday, while Austin Prock, his teammate and son of John Force Racing crew chief Jimmy Prock, won the Sunday final.

Force then doubled at New England Dragway in the first New England Nationals since 2022 (the 2023 race was rescheduled to Bristol the following week) by winning the Mission Foods Challenge for semifinalists at the previous round (Joliet) in defeating Blake Alexander on a holeshot that counts towards bonus points in the Countdown, then defeating Prock in the main elimination tournament's final round for his 157th victory.

In June 2024, Force suffered a traumatic brain injury in a fiery crash at Virginia Motorsports Park after his engine exploded at the end of a run. He was admitted into ICU. After a scare to his family and fans, he recovered.

== 2025 ==
On November 13, 2025 John Force went live on his John Force Racing Facebook page to officially announce his retirement from driving. Quoted with saying "Until this racecar kills me, they're gonna have to drag me out the seat, but the truth is I was dragged outta the seat in Richmond". While still recovering from his horrific crash at the Virginia Nationals on June 23, 2024 and still under doctors care, John went on to say that he wants to spend time with his grandchildren and he is looking forward to having more grandchildren from Brittany. His daughter Brittany Force has previously announced her retirement towards the end of this NHRA season from driving to focus on starting her family. Josh Hart was named her replacement.

== Achievements and awards ==
=== Championships ===
- 1984 AHRA Funny Car Champion
- 1985 ADRA Funny Car WORLD FINALS Champion
- 1990 NHRA Funny Car Champion
- 1991 NHRA Funny Car Champion
- 1993 NHRA Funny Car Champion
- 1994 NHRA Funny Car Champion
- 1995 NHRA Funny Car Champion
- 1996 NHRA Funny Car Champion
- 1997 NHRA Funny Car Champion
- 1998 NHRA Funny Car Champion
- 1999 NHRA Funny Car Champion
- 2000 NHRA Funny Car Champion
- 2001 NHRA Funny Car Champion
- 2002 NHRA Funny Car Champion
- 2003 NHRA Champion Owner (Tony Pedregon, Funny Car)
- 2004 NHRA Funny Car Champion
- 2006 NHRA Funny Car Champion
- 2009 NHRA Champion Owner (Robert Hight, Funny Car)
- 2010 NHRA Funny Car Champion
- 2013 NHRA Funny Car Champion
- 2017 NHRA Champion Owner (Brittany Force, Top Fuel)
- 2017 NHRA Champion Owner (Robert Hight, Funny Car)
- 2019 NHRA Champion Owner (Robert Hight, Funny Car)
- 2022 NHRA Champion Owner (Brittany Force, Top Fuel)
- 2024 NHRA Champion Owner (Austin Prock, Funny Car)
- 2025 NHRA Champion Owner (Austin Prock, Funny Car)

=== Achievements ===
- Selected as "Driver of the Year" for all of American motor racing in 1996 by a national panel of motorsports journalists, the first drag racer ever so honored.
- 157 wins in 269 final rounds following the 2024 season (first driver with 100 wins)
- First member of the NHRA 1,000 Round Win Club by accumulating 1,000 career elimination round wins, with the 1,000th round win being in the first round of the 2008 NHRA Midwest Nationals at World Wide Technology Raceway at Gateway near St. Louis, Missouri), where he defeated Ron Capps. Greg Anderson became the second on June 8, 2025. At the 2025 NHRA prizegiving banquet, Force and Anderson were officially inducted into the new club, presented with plaques and official dinner jackets intended to be work at the International Drag Racing Hall of Fame at the Don Garlits Museum of Drag Racing and also at the annual NHRA prizegiving.
- First driver to set an official NHRA Funny Car elapsed time under five seconds in the quarter mile (October 16, 1993, Texas Motorplex, 4.996).
- 16-time NHRA champion driver, and 21-time champion owner.
- Ranked #2 on the NHRA Top 50 Drivers, 1951–2000, behind Don Garlits
- With daughter Ashley, first father/daughter pair to compete against each other, during the first round of the NHRA Southern Nationals in Atlanta in 2008, which saw Ashley win.
- Only driver to have won more than ten championships in his division, beating the record once held by retired NHRA Pro Stock Champion Bob Glidden, who had 10 championships
- Most event #1 qualifications in NHRA history, with 161 (as of May 15, 2021)
- Force received the Lee Iacocca Award at Bristol Dragway on June 19, 2012
- Most consecutive championship seasons - 10 (1993-2002)

=== Awards ===
- Inducted into the Motorsports Hall of Fame of America in 2008.
- Inducted into the International Drag Racing Hall of Fame in 2023.
- Eighth and final member of the Cragar Wheels 250 MPH Funny Car Club in 1983.
- Second member of the Castrol 4-second Club for Funny Cars in 1993.
- First member of 1,000 Round Win Club when officially established in 2025.

== Driving Force ==
John was featured on A&E's reality show Driving Force with his wife (Laurie) and three of his daughters (Ashley, Courtney, and Brittany).

== See also ==
- Ford Racing

== Sources ==
- Taylor, Thom. "Beauty Beyond the Twilight Zone" in Hot Rod, April 2017, pp. 30–43.
