= John Force Racing =

NHRA drag racing team

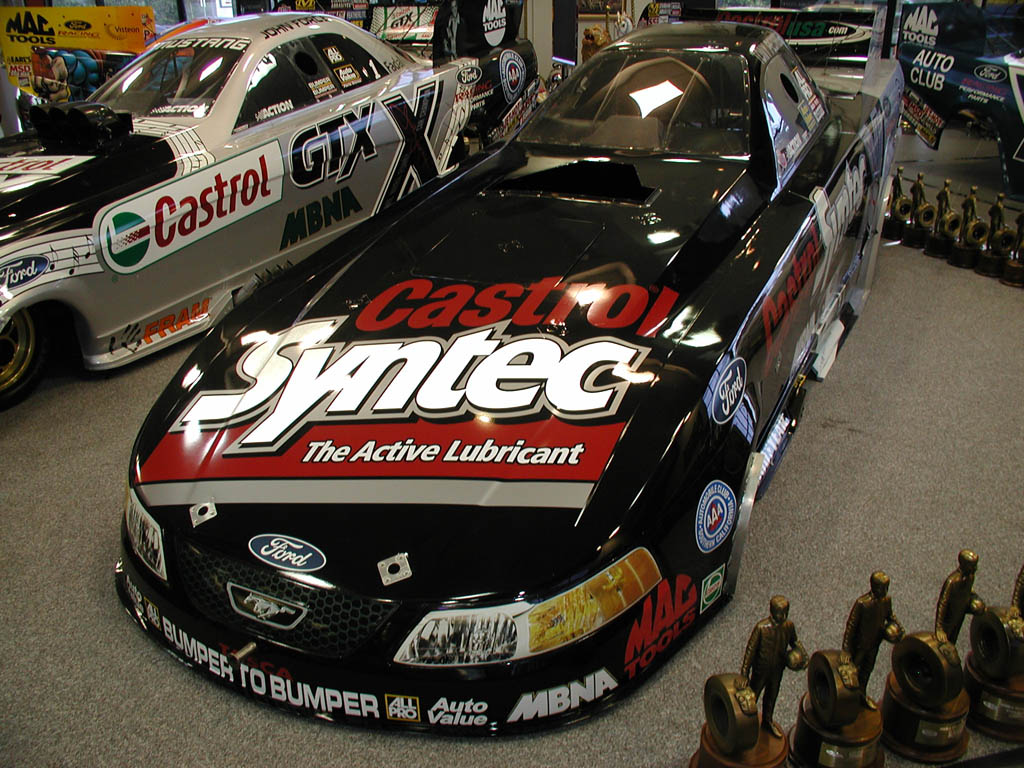
- Founder(s): John Force
- Base: Yorba Linda, California Brownsburg, Indiana
- Current series: NHRA Mission Foods Drag Racing Series
- Current drivers: Top Fuel; Josh Hart (racer); Funny Car; Jack Beckman; Alexis DeJoria; Jordan Vandergriff
- Teams' Championships: 24
- Website: johnforceracing.com

John Force Racing is an NHRA drag racing team. In over 30 years of competition, John Force Racing has won two Top Fuel and 22 Funny Car championships. The current line-up of drivers includes Top Fuel driver Josh Hart and Funny Car drivers Jack Beckman, Alexis DeJoria, and Jordan Vandergriff. The team's leadership includes CEO John Force, CFO Adria Force, Vice President Ashley Force Hood, John Liu as Corporate Controller. Past drivers include Austin Prock, Robert Hight, Gary Densham and crew chiefs Austin Coil and Mike Neff, Eric Medlen, who lost his life while racing for the team and whose number 4 appears on all their cars, Tony Pedregon, who was the first driver other than Force to win a series championship driving for the team, and Courtney Force. In 2017, Brittany Force became the first team driver to win a championship in a classification that is not Funny Car, taking the Top Fuel title.

Force's team had a long term relationship with Castrol and Ford, with Castrol serving as Force's primary sponsor for over 30 years and Ford his engine provider for 20 years. Both of those relationships came to an end following the 2014 season when BP, Castrol's parent company, ceased their sponsorship and Ford pulled out of the NHRA. Force's teams now run Chevrolets, sponsored by Old World Industries, Cornwell Tools, Bandero Premium Tequila, Burnyzz Speed Shop, Speedmaster, and HendrickCars.com.

== Championships ==
Year	Division	Driver
1990	Funny Car	John Force
1991	Funny Car	John Force
1993	Funny Car	John Force
1994	Funny Car	John Force
1995	Funny Car	John Force
1996	Funny Car	John Force
1997	Funny Car	John Force
1998	Funny Car	John Force
1999	Funny Car	John Force
2000	Funny Car	John Force
2001	Funny Car	John Force
2002	Funny Car	John Force
2003	Funny Car	Tony Pedregon
2004	Funny Car	John Force
2006	Funny Car	John Force
2009	Funny Car	Robert Hight
2010	Funny Car	John Force
2013	Funny Car	John Force
2017	Top Fuel	Brittany Force
2017	Funny Car	Robert Hight
2019	Funny Car	Robert Hight
2022	Top Fuel	Brittany Force
2024	Funny Car	Austin Prock
2025	Funny Car	Austin Prock
