= Eric Medlen =

American racing driver (1973–2007)

- Medlen in 2006
- Born: Eric John Medlen; August 13, 1973 Oakdale, California, U.S.
- Died: March 23, 2007 (aged 33) Gainesville, Florida, U.S.

NHRA Powerade Drag Racing Series
- Years active: 2004 - 2007
- Teams: John Force Racing
- Wins: 6 (FC)
- Best finish: 4th in 2005 2006

Eric John Medlen (August 13, 1973 – March 23, 2007) was an American NHRA Fuel Funny Car driver. Medlen drove for John Force Racing in 2004, 2005, and 2006, campaigning in the Castrol Syntec Ford Mustang Fuel Funny Car, and in 2007, campaigning in the Auto Club/Pleasant Holiday Ford Mustang Fuel Funny Car. He had a total of six career wins. His first win came during his Rookie season in 2004 at Brainerd International Raceway.

Medlen was born in Oakdale, CA, the son of John and Mary (Mimi) Medlen and brother of Eryn Medlen. He worked as a mechanic for John Force and past teammate Tony Pedregon for eight years until Pedregon left to join his brother Cruz's race team. Medlen was moved into Pedregon's Castrol Syntec-sponsored car. In 2004, he was a top contender for the NHRA Road to the Future Funny Car Rookie of the Year. He followed with three wins in 2005 and two wins in 2006. Each year he raced, he placed in the top five or higher in NHRA Championship Points. Prior to 2004, his fastest elapsed time was 4.681 seconds. His fastest speed was 328.54 MPH. He had eight #1 qualifiers and a 94–65 win–loss record.

Medlen was a champion calf roper in high school and considered a career as a professional team roper with his partner and mentor, World Champion Team Roper Jerold Camarillo. He also loved to build custom motorcycles and paint his race helmets. His father John Medlen was his crew chief.

== Death ==
On March 19, 2007, during a test session at Gainesville Raceway in Gainesville, Florida, Medlen was critically injured when his Funny Car developed the most severe tire shake ever recorded in a Funny Car. The side-to-side force of the shake caused his head to hit the roll bars around his head, causing severe head injuries. He became unconscious, causing the car to lose control and strike the wall.

After being cut free from the car by the NHRA Safety Safari and receiving emergency treatment at the track, Medlen was transferred by Alachua County Fire Rescue to Shands at the University of Florida where he was treated for four days for what doctors characterized as a severe closed head injury.

Medlen survived a delicate, three-hour craniectomy procedure to relieve pressure and hemorrhaging on March 20, 2007, but succumbed to complications of diffuse axonal injury three days later after being removed from life support in accordance with his own previously stated wishes.

According to auto racing safety expert John Melvin, Medlen was literally shaken to death in the incident. The deflating tire caused an 18-inch movement up and down, which then exerted a force of 40,000 or more pounds as it rotated.

Medlin was the first NHRA fatality since 2004, when Top Fuel racer Darrell Russell lost his life in a race, and the first Funny Car driver to lose his life. John Force Racing immediately began an investigation into Medlen's death, leading to the development of the Eric Medlen Chassis.

== Legacy ==
Sonoma Raceway holds the Eric Medlen Ice Cream Social with fans and competitors being able to have ice cream after the final round of qualifying during the track's NHRA Mission Foods cing Series race. Medlen mentioned that a person can never be unhappy when eating ice cream. The benefit helps local racers in the San Francisco Bay area who race at Sonoma toward a scholarship fund.

One major legacy that was left behind by Medlen happened after his death, the NHRA enacted a new safety requirement within the Funny Car division, that states that the roll bars within the car now have to be padded. The roll bars are padded with a heavy foam rubber insulation and wrapped with seven layers of Nomex fabric to make the foam rubber more resistant to fire. This has dramatically reduced the kinds of injuries among drivers that Medlen suffered which ultimately resulted in his death.

The project to build a safer car at John Force Racing after his death is called the Eric Medlen Project, with the new chassis often called an Eric Medlen chassis.

== Career ==
National Event Wins

- 2004 Brainerd
- 2005 Seattle
- 2005 Brainerd
- 2005 Memphis
- 2006 Sonoma
- 2006 Richmond

Other

- Earned three 2005 tour victories, equaling the total of series champion Gary Scelzi. Scelzi's crew chief, Mike Neff, succeeded Medlen in the John Force Racing ride in 2008 and 2009.
- Became the fourth different driver to win an NHRA national event in a John Force Racing Ford Mustang when he prevailed at Brainerd, Minn., in 2004.
- Had 55 total victories with John Force Racing – six as driver of the Castrol Syntec Ford, one as a crew member on the Syntec Ford (1996) and 48 as a crew member on John Force's championship-winning Fords (1997-2003).

== Highlights by Year ==
=== 2006 ===
Was perfect 2-for-2 in final-round appearances; Matched career-best finish of fourth place in POWERade standings; Advanced out of the first round at 17 of 23 events.

=== 2005 ===
- Finished a career-best fourth in NHRA POWERade points.
- Won three times in a four-race period (Seattle, Brainerd, and Memphis) in mid-season to thrust himself prominently into a five-way battle for the POWERade Championship.
- Became just the sixth driver to break the 4.70-second barrier with a career-best 4.698 in qualifying for the O'Reilly Fall Nationals at Dallas.
- Earned his first repeat victory when he won for the second straight year at Brainerd, Minnesota.

=== 2004 ===
- Was a finalist for the Automobile Club of Southern California Road to the Future Award naming the top rookies in the NHRA POWERade Series and the Funny Car division.
- Finished fifth in driver points.
- Earned breakthrough victory at Brainerd, beating three-time former NHRA Top Fuel Champion Gary Scelzi in the final.
- Runner-up to Whit Bazemore at Topeka.
- No. 1 qualifier at Englishtown, New Jersey, and Reading, Pennsylvania.
- Four-time winner of the Motel 6 "Who Got the Light?" award presented at each event to the winning driver of the pro race decided by the narrowest margin.

Preceded by Darrell Russell	NHRA Mello Yello Drag Racing fatalities 2007	Succeeded by Scott Kalitta
