= Courtney Force =

American NHRA drag racer

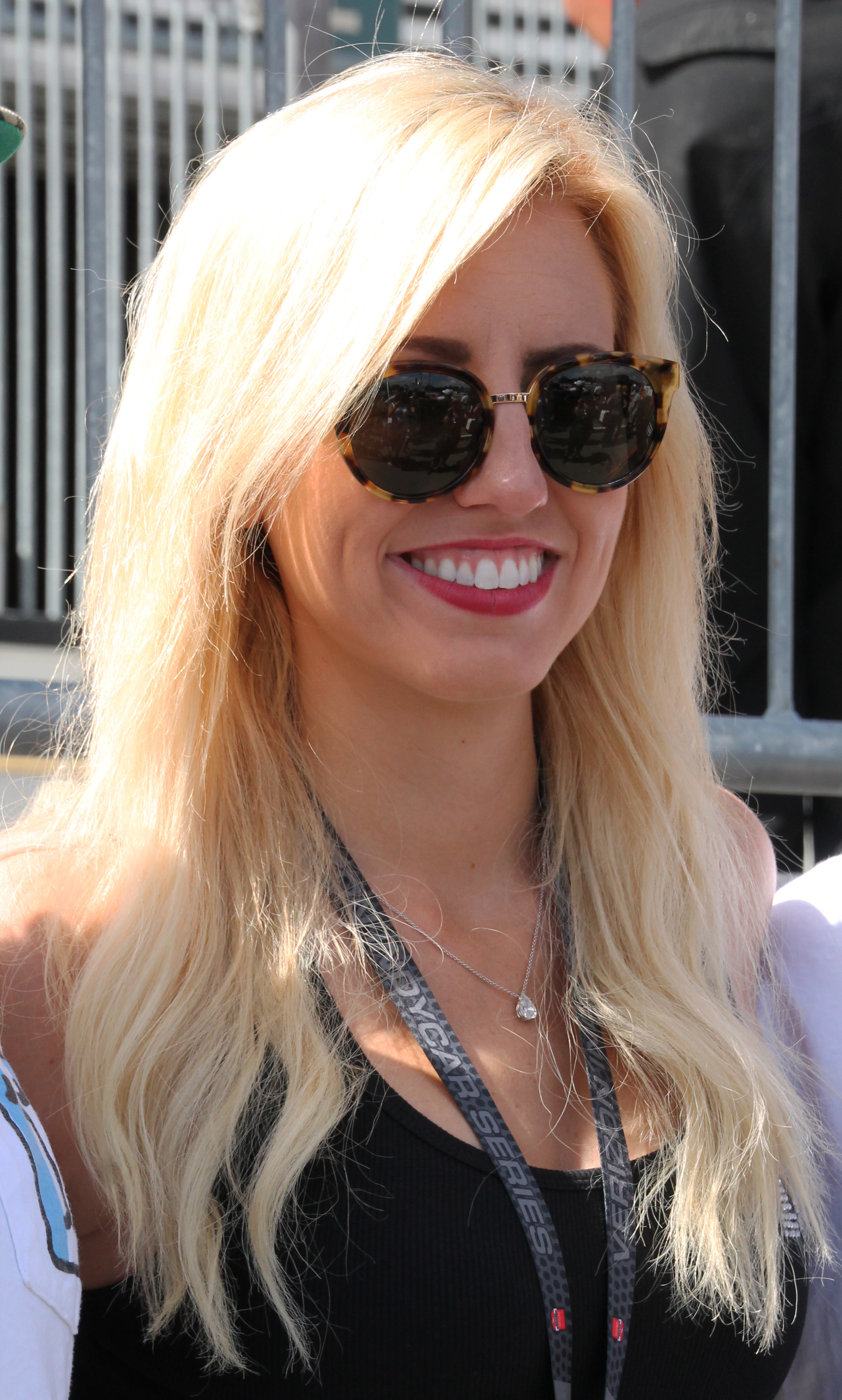
- Force in 2015
- Born: Courtney Fallon Force; June 20, 1988 (age 38) Yorba Linda, California, U.S.
- Relatives: John Force (father); Ashley Force Hood (sister); Brittany Force (sister); Graham Rahal (husband); Bobby Rahal (father-in-law); Robert Hight (ex brother-in-law)

NHRA Mello Yello Drag Racing Series
- Years active: 2012-2018
- Teams: John Force Racing
- Wins: 13 (12 FC, 1 TAD)

Awards
- 2012: Auto Club Road to the Future Award

Courtney Fallon Force-Rahal (born June 20, 1988) is an American former drag racer who competed on the NHRA tour. She drove the Advance Auto Parts Chevy Camaro SS Funny Car for John Force Racing. She is the youngest daughter of 16-time NHRA World Funny Car Champion John Force and his wife Laurie. She is a graduate of Cal State Fullerton having majored in Communications. On July 19, 2009, Force-Rahal won her first national event in the Top Alcohol Dragster category at the 22nd annual NHRA Northwest Nationals in Kent, Washington. After her sister, Ashley, announced her retirement from competitive racing in 2011, Force-Rahal became the fourth driver for John Force Racing. On July 27, 2014, Force-Rahal passed her sister for the record of most Funny Car wins by a female driver in NHRA history.

== Drag racing career ==
Force earned her NHRA competition drivers license in 2005 and her Alcohol-Fuel license in 2008. She began racing in Super Comp before graduating to Top Alcohol Dragster (TA/D), along with her sister Brittany, in 2008. She reached the final round twice in 2009, at Seattle and Pomona, picking up the victory in Seattle. Force has raced her sister Brittany on three occasions, beating her every time. She recorded a career best reaction time of .006 in the final event of 2009 at Pomona raceway.

Force's primary sponsor throughout her Super Comp career and first year of Top Alcohol Dragster was Brandsource. In 2009, Force picked up sponsorship by Sanyo, as well as Ford.

During the 2011 season, Force tested a Funny Car and earned her NHRA Funny Car license.

On January 10, 2012, it was announced that Traxxas would be the primary sponsor of Force's rookie season.

Force made her Funny Car debut at the 52nd annual O'Reilly Auto Parts NHRA Winternationals. She qualified 12th with a 4.199 ET at 307.44 mph (494.78 km/h). In the first round of eliminations, she defeated Bob Tasca III with a pass of 4.204 seconds at 309.27 mph (497.72 km/h). In the second round, she lost to teammate Mike Neff despite running a career best 4.143 ET at 313.88 mph (505.14 km/h).

During the second race of the season, the Arizona Nationals in Phoenix, she took out her father in the first round.

Force's funny car in 2012

On 5 August 2012, Force won her first FC race, by defeating Matt Hagan in the final round of The Northwest Nationals, at Seattle, Washington.

To kick off the 2013 season, Force qualified in the number 1 position for the O'Reily Auto Parts Winternationals, becoming the first woman to do so. She would also go on to be the first female Funny Car driver to win that event, beating Ron Capps in the final.

At Kansas in 2014, Force achieved the 100th win by a female driver in NHRA by defeating Cruz Pedregon in the Funny Car final.

From 2017 to 2018, Force drove for Advance Auto Parts. At the 2017 NHRA Finals in Pomona, California, Force drove a co-branded car supported by Taylor Swift.

On January 24, 2019, Force announced she would stop driving, effective immediately.

== Television ==
Force was featured with her family on A&E's reality show Driving Force.

== Personal life ==
Courtney has two older sisters, Ashley and Brittany. She also has an older half-sister, Adria. Force attended Esperanza High School in Anaheim, California, where she was a cheerleader. In 2009, she participated in the Ford Fiesta movement and won the Internet's most popular agent award. In 2013, Force posed nude for ESPN's The Body Issue magazine. She is married to IndyCar racer Graham Rahal, who is the son of 1986 Indianapolis 500 winner Bobby Rahal. In November 2020, she gave birth to a daughter, Harlan Ann Rahal. In September 2022, Courtney gave birth to Tinley Leighton Rahal and announced on her Facebook page she was stepping back from her roles at her foundation and sponsorship to be a mom. On October 17, 2025, she gave birth to Fallon Ruth Rahal.
