= Night Stalker (funny car) =

Overview
- Production: 1971
- Designer: Jack Chrisman

Body and chassis
- Class: Top Fuel Funny Car
- Body style: Funny Car

Powertrain
- Engine: Transverse-mounted

Night Stalker is an unusual funny car.

Built by Jack Chrisman in 1971, the Mustang was a "sidewinder" — that is, the engine was mounted transversely in the chassis.

Night Stalker was the first funny car John Force ever drove.

== Sources ==
- Taylor, Thom. "Beauty Beyond the Twilight Zone" in Hot Rod, April 2017, pp. 30–43.
