= Brittany Force =

American NHRA drag racer

- Force in 2026
- Nationality: American
- Born: Brittany Leighton Force; July 8, 1986 (age 40) Yorba Linda, California, U.S.
- Relatives: John Force (father); Ashley Force Hood (sister); Courtney Force (sister); Robert Hight (ex brother-in-law); Graham Rahal (brother-in-law)

NHRA Mission Foods Drag Racing Series career
- Debut season: 2013
- Current team: John Force Racing
- Championships: 2 (TF)
- Wins: 18
- Fastest laps: Best ET; 3.623 seconds; Best Speed; 343.51 mph (552.83 km/h)

Championship titles
- 2017, 2022: NHRA Top Fuel Champion

Awards
- 2013: Auto Club Road to the Future Award
- Statistics up to date as of September 15, 2025.

Brittany Leighton Force (born July 8, 1986) is an American NHRA drag racer and 2-time NHRA Drag Racing Series Top Fuel dragster champion who currently has the record for fastest run, at 343.51 mph. She is the daughter of drag racer John Force and the sister of fellow racers Courtney Force and Ashley Force Hood.

== Career ==
Force became an NHRA drag racer in 2013, driving a Top Fuel dragster, the first John Force Racing driver to compete in that class. She is sponsored by Monster Energy. In 2016, she became the first woman to win the NHRA Four-Wide Nationals. On May 20, 2016, she set a new NHRA top fuel drag racing record with a run of 3.676 seconds over 1,000 feet at Heartland Park Topeka, Kansas.

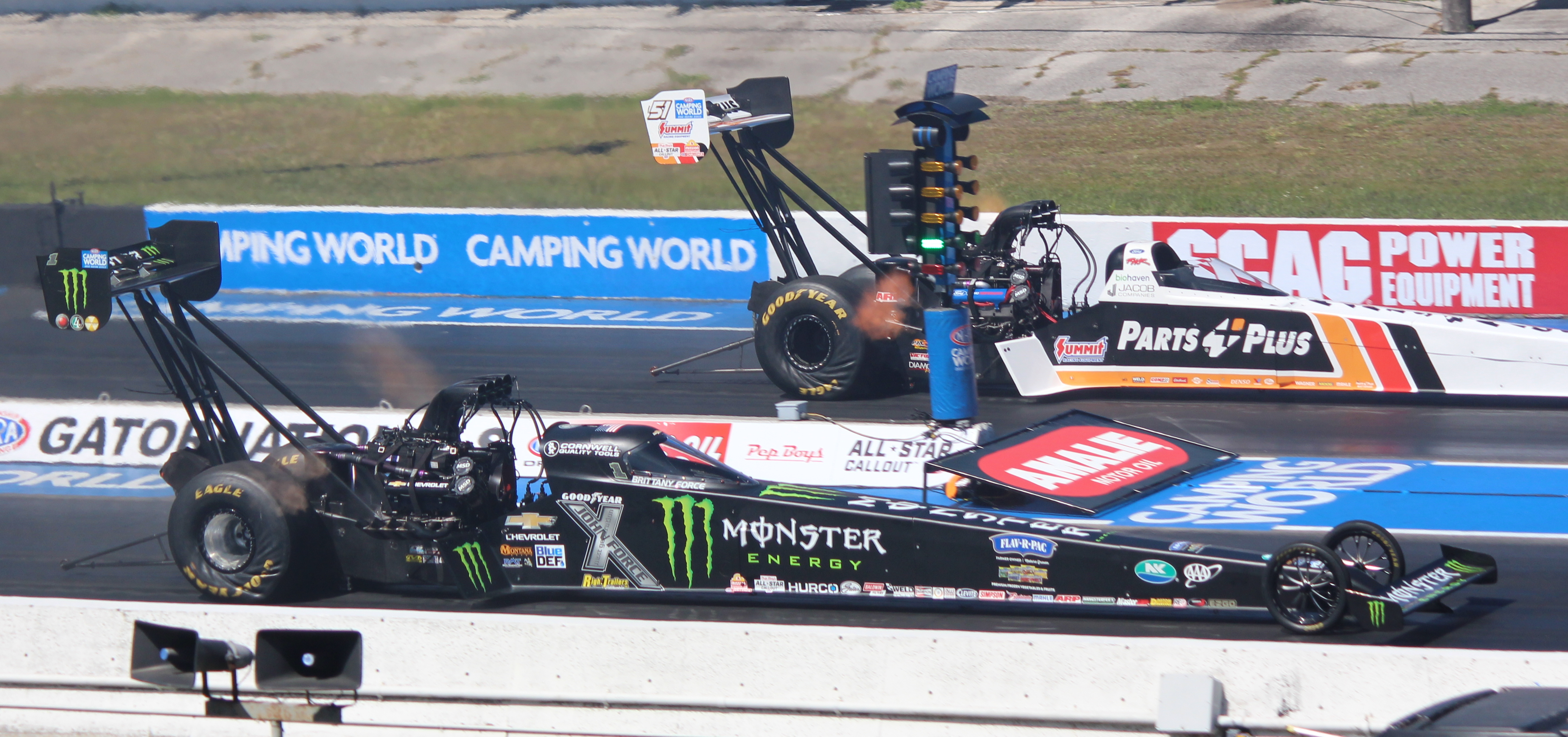
Force's Top Fuel dragster at the 2023 Gatornationals

In 2017, Force became the second woman in history to win a Top Fuel Championship, after Shirley Muldowney in 1982, clinching the title in the quarterfinals of the final race of the season before going on to win the event. Force won 4 races for the year, the most in a single season in her career, including 3 in the Countdown to the Championship.

In 2019, Force became the first woman driver to be the Number 1 qualifier in Top Fuel at the U.S. Nationals.

On Oct 2, 2022, Force set the national record with fastest top fuel run in history at 338.17 mph at the NHRA Midwest Nationals. Force won the 2022 NHRA Top Fuel championship and reset the speed record to 338.94 mph. She also has set the E.T. record at 3.623 seconds. Force has 16 career NHRA wins.

On July 20, 2025, Force broke her own speed record with a 341.59 mph pass at the NHRA Northwest Nationals in Kent, Washington, and on 28 July 2025, set the current record of 343.16 mph.

Force announced on September 12, 2025, she will be stepping away from competition at the conclusion of the 2025 season. Josh Hart was named her replacement at John Force Racing.

== Personal life ==
Force attended California State University, Fullerton, where she received a bachelor's degree in English and a teaching credential.
