= Cruz Pedregon =

American racing driver

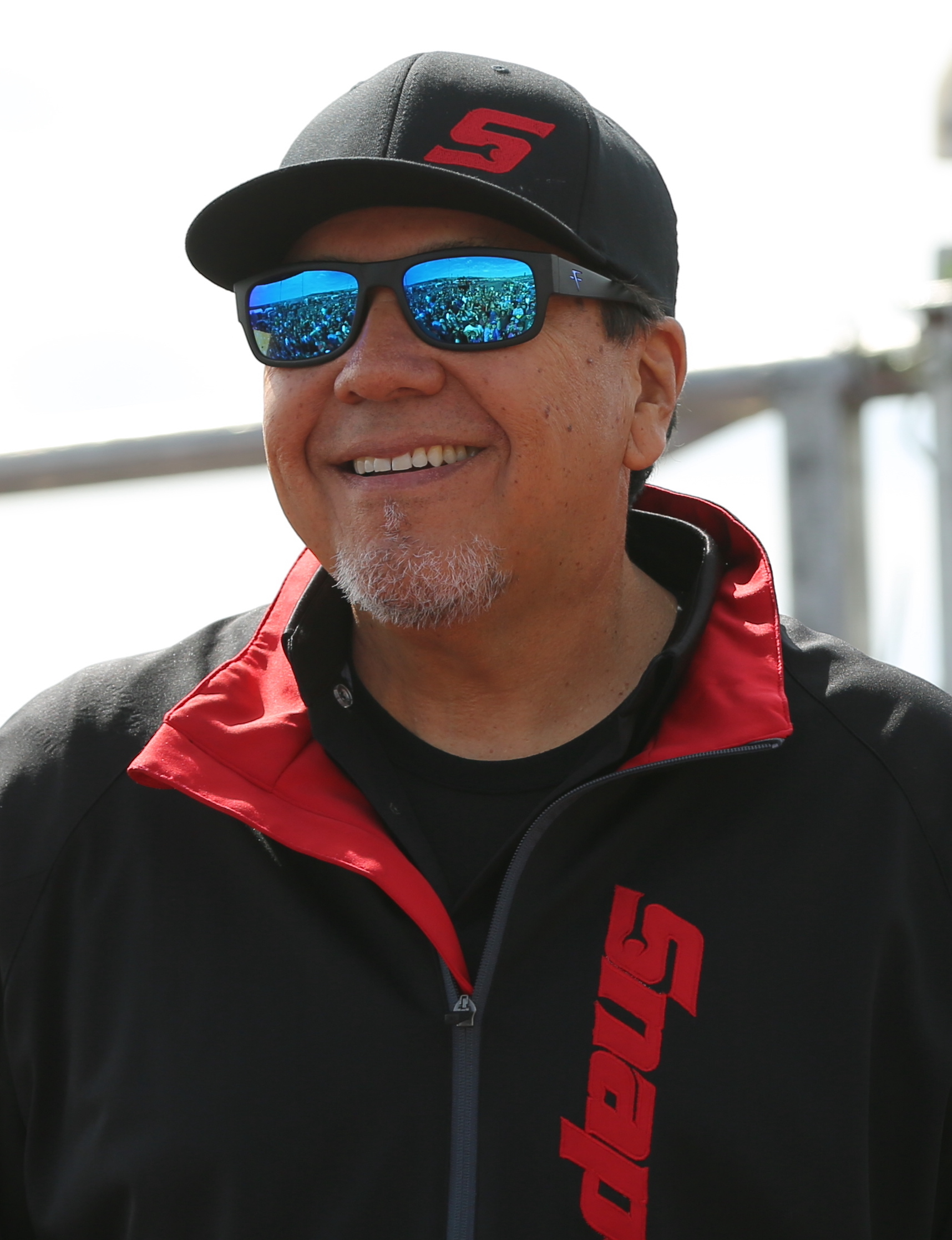
- Pedregon at Sonoma Raceway in 2026
- Born: Cruz Pedregon Lopez; September 19, 1963 (age 63) Torrance, California, U.S.
- Relatives: Tony Pedregon (brother); Frank Pedregon Jr.(brother)

NHRA Mission Foods Drag Racing Series career
- Years active: 1987 - 2000, 2002-present
- Teams: Cruz Pedregon Racing, Inc.
- Championships: 2 (FC)
- Wins: 44 (40 FC, 3 TAD, 1 TAFC)
- Fastest laps: Best ET; 3.839 seconds; Best Speed; 335.65 mph (540.18 km/h)

Championship titles
- 1992, 2008: NHRA Funny Car Champion

Awards
- 1997: Premio De Oro
- Statistics up to date as of September 15, 2025.

Cruz Pedregon Lopez (born September 19, 1963) is an American two-time NHRA Mission Foods Drag Racing Series Funny Car Champion from Torrance, California. He is the brother of Tony Pedregon, also a two-time Funny Car Champion & Frank Pedregon Jr. who has won multiple NHRA National Events. He currently races for his own team, Cruz Pedregon Racing, Inc.

== Early days ==
Pedregons's funny car at Heartland Park Topeka in 1995

Pedergon was born in Torrance, CA, the son of drag racer Frank Pedregon, Sr. Pedregon began his career in 1980 behind wheel of a 1953 Kenworth truck. He raced go-karts in 1986 and was track champion at Ventura California Raceway. In 1987, he joined NHRA Competition, racing an Alcohol Dragster. After three years in Alcohol Dragsters, he moved to Alcohol Funny Cars. In 1991, Pedregon moved to Top Fuel Competition, racing a partial schedule. In 1992, Pedregon won the Funny Car Championship. He would be the only driver besides John Force to win it in the 1990s. He was also one of the first Funny Car drivers to record a five-second e.t. In 1994, he was the only Funny Car driver to defeat John Force in a final round the entire season, and qualified in the top half at 15 of the 18 national events. In 1995, Pedregon won the U.S. Nationals at Indianapolis for the third time in four years, having also won in 1992 and 1994. In 1996, Pedregon competed in a limited schedule, winning one race and finishing third in the final points standings. In 1997, Pedregon became the only motorsports driver to win the "Premio De Oro", an award for outstanding Hispanic Athletes. In 1998, Pedregon qualified first for a career best 12 races. In 1999, Pedregon formed his own team and raced a partial schedule in Funny Car. Pedregon won his first race as an owner/driver at Englishtown in 2000.

== Retirement and comeback ==
Pedregon at Maple Grove Raceway in 2012

In 2001, Pedregon served as a color analyst for ESPN's NHRA coverage. After his year off Pedregon returned to racing, qualifying for 18 races as an owner driver. In 2003, Pedregon finished the highest in the funny car standings since 1998. In 2004, he earned first No. 1 qualifying position since 1998 at Columbus. In 2005, Pedregon earned a pair of No. 1 qualifiers at Englishtown and Chicago He set the low E.T. at two events (Englishtown and Chicago), and won a $25,000 bonus for having closest margin of victory in the Motel 6 Who Got the Light award. In 2006 Pedregon won his first race in six years. He qualified for 21 of 23 events and advanced to 3 final rounds. Pedregon won 16 rounds to 18 losses in 2007. He also went to three finals and qualified first in Houston.

In 2008, Pedregon earned his second career NHRA Full Throttle Series Championship Title (the other being in 1992), when his brother Tony Pedregon defeated the only other driver left in contention at the year’s final race. He had an incredible charge in the playoffs, winning three of four final-round appearances, including the final three events of the season. He also won the $100,000 NHRA Showdown in Indianapolis.

== Personal life ==
Pedregon resides in Brownsburg, Indiana. He is fluent in Spanish and frequently works with Hispanic media. He is of Mexican American descent.
