= Alexis DeJoria =

American drag racer (born 1977)

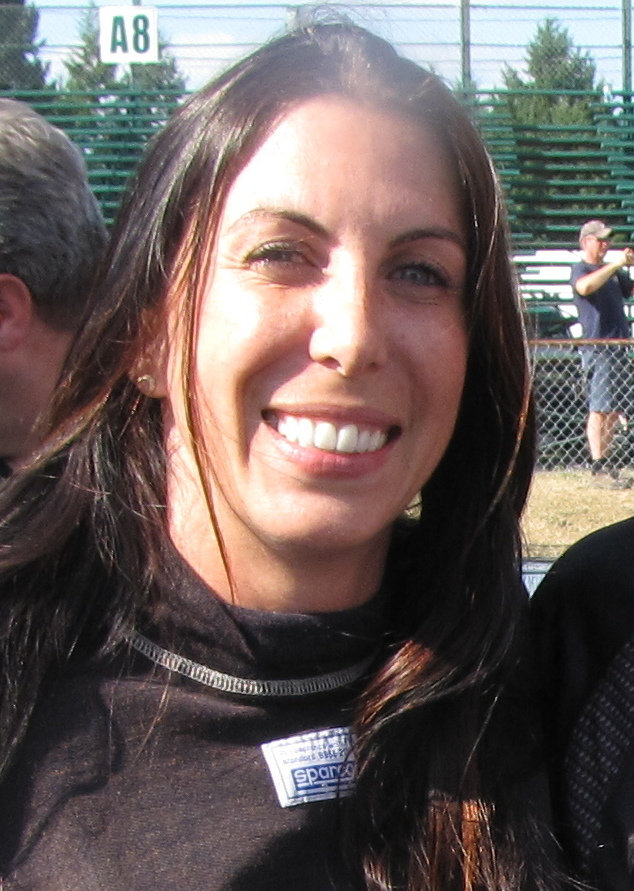
- DeJoria in 2011
- Born: Alexis Jones DeJoria; September 24, 1977 (age 49); Venice Beach, California, U.S.
- Father: John Paul DeJoria

NHRA Mission Foods Drag Racing Series career
- Current team: John Force Racing
- Years active: 2005–2017, 2020–present
- Crew chief: Mike Neff
- Former teams: Kalitta Motorsports, Stealth Motorsports, JCM Racing
- Wins: 6 (FC)
- Fastest laps: Best ET; 3.854 seconds; Best Speed; 336.40 mph (541.38 km/h)

Previous series
- NHRA Lucas Oil Drag Racing Series

Alexis Jones DeJoria (born September 24, 1977) is an American drag racer who competes in the National Hot Rod Association (NHRA) Funny Car category. She previously drove a Toyota Camry for Kalitta Motorsports (owned by Connie Kalitta), sponsored by Patrón Spirits Company. She returned to competitive racing in 2020 with a new team led by crew chiefs Del Worsham and Nicky Boninfante. As of 2019, she was the third richest female athlete in the world, and as of 2022 the second richest with a net worth of $100 million.

== Career ==
DeJoria began her NHRA career in 2005, initially competing in the Super Gas category, before moving into a Super Comp dragster. Eight months after her NHRA debut, she went on to win the Sportsman Nationals in Fontana, California.

DeJoria spent the next two years racing on the West coast in Top Alcohol Funny Car (TA/FC).

In 2009, DeJoria built her own racing team, Stealth Motorsports. At the 2011 NHRA Northwest Fall Nationals, she won her first ever NHRA national event win in TA/FC, becoming the second woman ever to do so. She co-owned and operated the team for three years, leaving in 2011 to join Kalitta Motorsports as their fourth member and second funny car driver. This move coincided with her transition to racing a nitro (Fuel) funny car at the 2011 Texas Fall Nationals.

In 2012, DeJoria raced her first final-round appearance at Bristol. That year she also set both a career best for time with a run of 4.032 and speed of 319.07 mph (513.49 km/h) at Reading.

During the 2013 season, DeJoria had four semi-final finishes.

DeJoria's funny car at Sonoma in 2023

In 2014, DeJoria became the first woman ever to make a sub-four second pass, with a 3.997-second e.t., during the NHRA Winternationals at Pomona. At her next race in Phoenix, DeJoria won her first race in Funny Car. In March 2014, she picked up the second win of her professional career in Las Vegas. That May, she broke a Funny Car track record at Atlanta Dragway (4.012-second e.t.) while earning her the number one qualifier position. That summer, she went on to break Brainerd International Raceway's Funny Car ET record with a 4.010-second pass, then reset her own record with a 3.998-second pass, the first sub-four second Funny Car pass at BIR. In September she won the U.S. Nationals in Indianapolis. On June 7, 2015, DeJoria reached the final round in Nitro Funny Car in the NHRA Summernationals at Englishtown.

DeJoria announced her return from a two-year hiatus in late 2019. She stated plans to run the entire 2020 schedule in the hopes of becoming the first woman to win a Funny Car championship. During this time DeJoria entered into a multi year sponsorship with ROKiT Phones and ABK Beer, with branding appearing on DeJoria's vehicle, driver and crew uniforms, official merchandise and across her team's transport fleet.

== Filmography ==
DeJoria played the role of Paula, in the 2013 film Snake & Mongoose.

== Personal life ==
DeJoria was married to American television personality and motorcycle customizer Jesse James. On March 17, 2020, it was announced via social media that Alexis and Jesse James were getting divorced. Among the reasons given was James' infidelity.

DeJoria is the daughter of entrepreneur John Paul DeJoria and Jamie Briggs.

DeJoria has a daughter, Bella, from a previous relationship.

== Philanthropy ==
DeJoria, along with her mother Jamie Briggs, joined Sallie Latimer's efforts to raise money to repair the Earles Court water tower.
