= Robert Hight =

American racing driver

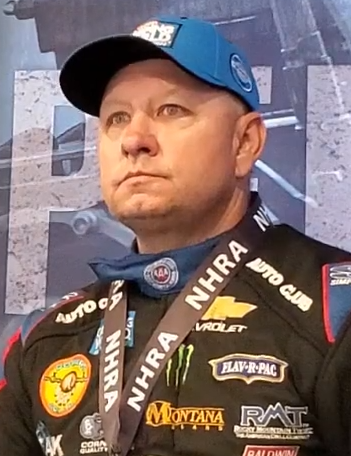
- Hight in 2022
- Born: Robert Connor Hight; August 20, 1969 (age 57); Alturas, California, U.S.
- Relatives: John Force (ex father-in-law); Laurie Force (ex step mother-in-law); Leslie Hight (wife); Adria Force Hight (ex-wife); Ashley Force Hood (ex half sister-in-law); Courtney Force (ex half sister-in-law); Brittany Force (ex half sister-in-law); Graham Rahal (ex half brother-in-law); Daniel Hood (ex half brother-in-law); Autumn Hight (daughter)

NHRA Mission Foods Drag Racing Series
- Years active: 2005–2023
- Teams: John Force Racing
- Championships: 3 (FC)
- Wins: 65
- Fastest laps: Best ET; 3.793 seconds; Best Speed; 339.87 mph (546.97 km/h)

Championship titles
- 2009, 2017, 2019: NHRA Funny Car Champion

Awards
- 2005: Auto Club Road to the Future Award

Robert Connor Hight (born August 20, 1969) is an American NHRA drag racer and president of John Force Racing, and former driver of the Auto Club of Southern California Chevrolet Camaro SS Funny Car. He is a three-time NHRA Camping World Drag Racing Series Funny Car champion, with titles in 2009, 2017 and 2019. His 2009 title gave the JFR team its 15th championship, while his 2017 title was the team's 19th crown. Hight has finished in the top-ten in points in all but one of his 14 competitive seasons (the exception being the 2020 season, when JFR only ran two championship rounds due to the COVID-19 pandemic).

Hight grew up in Alturas, California, and now lives in Yorba Linda, California.

== Early career ==
After a number of years as a fan, Hight eventually joined a team, and became a clutch specialist for John Force Racing in 1995. He worked as a crew member until 2005, when he was named a driver, teaming up with John Force and Eric Medlen.

== 2005 ==
Hight finished fifth in points in his first season with John Force Racing, totaling two victories, four final rounds, and a 28–21 record in 23 starts.

== 2006 ==
Hight finished second in points in his second season with JFR, garnering three victories, six final rounds, and a 35–20 record in 23 starts.

== 2017 ==
Hight entered his 13th season driving a Chevrolet Camaro, with crew chief Mike Neff and co-crew chiefs Jon Schaffer and Jason McCulloch. He started the season driving the California Highway Patrol car, reminiscent of a CHP car, at Auto Club Raceway at Pomona.

Hight's funny car at Sonoma in 2023

Beginning with the third race of the season, the NHRA Gatornationals, Hight was reunited with crew chief Jimmy Prock, with whom he had won the 2009 championship. After a slow start, the team gradually came together and earned its first No. 1 in June at the New England Nationals at New England Dragway in Epping, N.H. Hight earned the team's first victory at the Mile-High Nationals at Bandimere Speedway in Morrison, Colorado, and followed that up two weeks later with a win in the NHRA Northwest Nationals at Pacific Raceways in Kent, Washington. Gradually, with strong qualifying performances and solid races, the team crept into the top five, and eventually as high as second before the regular season ended at the Chevrolet Performance U.S. Nationals. Hight also starred with record-breaking performances, which included setting the NHRA's fastest speed ever - 339.87 mph at Sonoma Raceway in California in July - and the first 3.7-second performance in a Funny Car - 3.793 seconds at Brainerd International Raceway in Minnesota. By the end of the season, Hight would have seven of the top 10 speeds ever run in Funny Cars - all set in 2017.

In the Countdown to the Championship, Hight started strong, recording a victory in the opener, the NHRA Carolina Nationals at zMAX Dragway in Concord, N.C., and after a seesaw battle with defending champion Ron Capps over the next four races, a win in the AAA Texas Fall Nationals at Texas Motorplex in Ennis, Texas. A semifinals appearance in the next to last round in Las Vegas, Nev., helped him jump into the points lead, entering the final race, the Auto Club Finals at Auto Club Raceway at Pomona, which paid points-and-a-half. He clinched the title after winning his first-round matchup. He increased his lead to 98 points by finishing runner-up in the event.

Overall, Hight tied his career-bests of finals in a season (seven) and low ETs (10), and earned career-bests in elimination-round victories (45) and top event speeds (13). He earned four victories, the most he had earned since 2014, when he scored five wins.

== Personal life ==
Hight is an avid Los Angeles Dodgers fan. He was a star in trap shooting, and was close to pursuing the chance to compete on the U.S. Olympic team in that sport.

Hight was previously married to Adria Hight (Force), the oldest daughter of John Force. He later married Leslie Hight.
