= Jack Beckman =

American drag racer

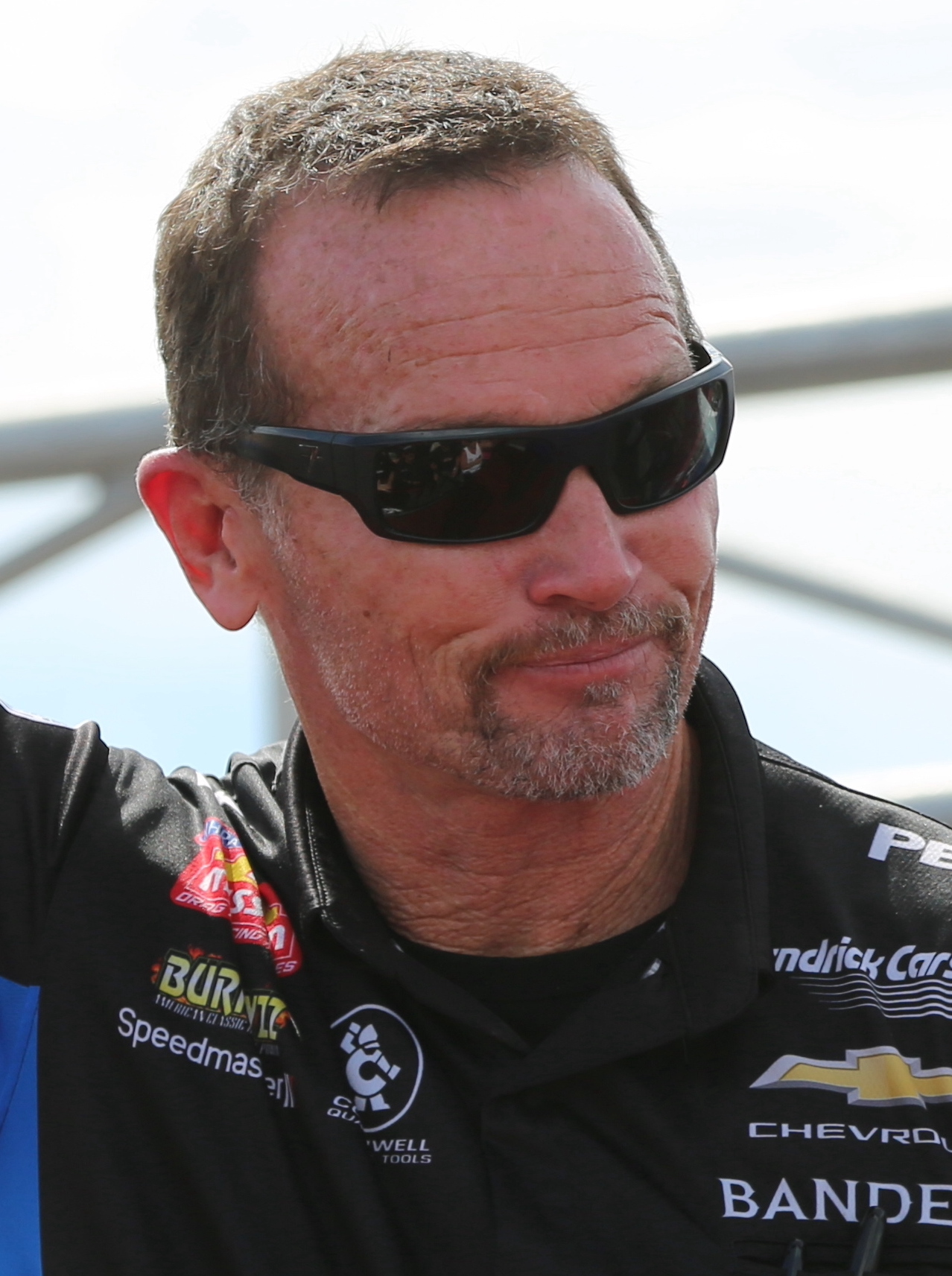
- Beckman at Sonoma Raceway in 2026
- Nationality: American
- Born: John Russell Beckman; June 28, 1966 (age 60) San Fernando, California, U.S.

NHRA Mission Foods Drag Racing Series career
- Current team: John Force Racing
- Years active: 1998–present
- Crew chief: Danny Hood and Tim Fabrisi
- Former teams: Don Schumacher Racing
- Championships: 1 (FC)
- Wins: 37 (FC); 2 Sportsman
- Fastest laps: Best ET; 3.812 seconds; Best Speed; 336.23 mph (541.11 km/h)

Championship titles
- 2012 2003: NHRA Funny Car Champion; NHRA Super Comp Champion
- Statistics up to date as of September 15, 2025.

John Russell Beckman (born June 28, 1966, at San Fernando, California and also known as Fast Jack,) is a professional drag racer currently driving for John Force Racing in the National Hot Rod Association Funny Car class.

Prior to that, Beckman raced for Don Schumacher Racing until 2020. Beckman won the Super Comp (8.90 second class) championship in 2003, his first Funny Car championship in November 2012 and achieved the third fastest Funny Car time in NHRA history in 2015. He raced the quickest time in Funny Car history earlier in that same month. Beckman was let go at the end of the 2020 season as part of Don Schumacher cutting back and did not race in a professional race until August 2024.

Off the track, Beckman was an instructor for Frank Hawley's Drag Racing School, the official driving instruction school of the National Hot Rod Association, and currently serves as a consultant. For over 11 years, Beckman instructed over 7,000 different students. He is currently documenting the sport's history and is taking part in the Wally Parks NHRA Motorsport Museum's History of Hot Rodding.

Beckman a former sergeant in the U.S. Air Force and in May 2013 he was presented with the U.S. Air Force Wall of Achievers honor in Enlisted Heritage Hall at Gunter Annex of Maxwell Air Force Base.

On July 30, 2024, Beckman came out of retirement to drive for John Force Racing in the primary Peak Antifreeze Chevrolet as a substitute driver after John Force had a season-ending injury at Virginia Motorsports Park during the Virginia Nationals during the first round of eliminations. Under NHRA rules, Beckman can finish the remaining eight races to allow the Force team to participate in the Countdown to the Championship. His first drive will be at Summit Motorsports Park in a session with the Cornwell Tools Night of Fire event, which legally is a test session in a non-championship, non-pressure situation.
