= Josh Hart (racer) =

American drag racer and entrepreneur (born 1983)

- Nationality: American
- Born: Joshua Lee Hart; September 16, 1983 (age 43) Huntington, Indiana, U.S.

NHRA Mission Foods Drag Racing Series career
- Debut season: 2021
- Current team: John Force Racing
- Years active: 10
- Teams: 2021-2025 Josh Hart Racing
- Engine: V8, 500 cubic inch
- Crew chief: David Grubnic (2026)
- Wins: 6 (3 TF, 3 TAD)
- Fastest laps: Best ET; 3.658 seconds; Best Speed; 340.30 mph (547.66 km/h)
- Best finish: 7th in 2022

Previous series
- 5 years: NHRA Lucas Oil Sportsman Series

Championship titles
- 2017: Lucas Oil East Region Top Alcohol Dragster Points Champion
- Statistics up to date as of October 30, 2025.

Joshua Lee Hart (born September 16, 1983) is an American race car driver and entrepreneur. He is the founder of Burnyzz Speed Shop in Ocala, Florida. He drives the 12,000-horsepower Burnyzz / Speedmaster NHRA Top Fuel Dragster in the NHRA Mission Foods Drag Racing Series for John Force Racing.

== Personal life ==
Joshua "Josh" Hart was born in Huntington, Indiana. In 2010 Josh and his wife, Brittanie, moved to Ocala, Florida and founded Burnyzz Speed Shop. Burnyzz Speed Shop underwent a $10 million expansion in 2021, expanding it to a full-service auto center with over 100,000 square feet under one roof and encompasses an entire city block.

In 2019, daughter, Helen Hart, joined their family and son, Banks Hart, was adopted in 2023. Among Hart's mentors he has credited for his success include Richard Clark, Andy Ackerman, Dennis Hendershot and Big Daddy Don Garlits.

In 2022 and 2023, the Hart family contributed time, money and equipment to organisations in their childhood hometown of Huntington. They have also hosted community events at their Burnyzz shop in Ocala.

== Burnyzz acquisition ==
On October 28, 2024, it was announced Farragut Capital Partners (Farragut), NewSpring Mezzanine (NewSpring), Pine Street Capital Partners (Pine Street), and Salem Investment Partners (Salem) would support A111 Capital's majority buyout of Burnyzz increasing Josh Hart's net worth by $52 million. The current management team, led by Founder and CEO Josh Hart, will continue to lead Burnyzz and oversee an additional $50 million investment to enable Burnyzz to expand into new markets.

The acquisition has brought increased national attention to Burnyzz. In April 2025, Burnyzz brought 38 vehicles to auction on the Hagerty Marketplace. Then in June 2025 at the National Hot Rod Association Thunder Valley Nationals in Bristol, TN, Burnyzz debuted a large display on the NHRA manufacturer's midway.

== NHRA career ==
Hart became an NHRA drag racer in 2011, racing a variety of sportsman vehicles. After earning his Top Alcohol Dragster license in 2015, Hart won three NHRA National event titles and eight NHRA regional TAD races between 2017 and 2019. Hart won the NHRA Regional Championship in 2017 and is a two-time NHRA U.S. Nationals winner (2018–19). He finished his Top Alcohol Dragster career in 2020 with a best time of 5.12 seconds at 283 miles per hour. After earning his Top Fuel license in 2020, he started his own team, Josh Hart Racing, winning two events, before selling the team and joining John Force Racing.

== John Force Racing ==
It was announced on October 15, 2025, that Hart had signed a $10 million multi-year contract to drive for John Force Racing, effective for the 2026 NHRA season. Hart replaced two-time NHRA Top Fuel Champion Brittany Force, who announced September 12 she would be stepping away from competition at the conclusion of the season

It was announced in January 2026 that Speedmaster would join Hart with John Force Racing as a co-primary sponsor.

Hart kicked off his career with John Force Racing in March 2026 by securing his first career top qualifying spot at the 2026 NHRA Gatornationals in Gainesville, Florida with personal bests of a 3.658 seconds at 340.30 miles per hour. He went on to win the event for his third-career NHRA Top Fuel win.

On April 8, 2026, it was announced Speedmaster would move to be full primary sponsor of team.

== Josh Hart Racing ==
Hart invested $22 million over five seasons, owning his own NHRA Top Fuel team between 2021 and 2025. The team was initially supported by TechNet Professional Auto Service, a professional service provided by Advance Auto Parts. At the 2021 NHRA Summit Racing Equipment Nationals in Norwalk, Ohio, Hart debuted a sponsorship with R+L Carriers. At the NHRA Carolina Nationals in September 2021, he captured his second career win. He finished the 2021 season 11th in points. After a successful rookie season, Hart made crew chief, Ron Douglas, a partner in the race team.

The 2022 season saw Hart earn a runner-up finish at the NHRA Summit Equipment Nationals. He finished a career-best seventh in points. In 2023 he started the NHRA season by winning the Pep Boys All-Star Callout at his hometown track in Gainesville, Fla. He finished the season tenth in points. Hart continued his streak of qualifying for the NHRA Countdown to the Championship in 2024. Following the 2024 season, Hart announced the addition of Jason McCulloch as a co-crew chief.

Hart renewed his R+L Carriers sponsorship at the beginning of the 2025 season. He also added Snap-on Tools as a new marketing partner for 2025. He kicked-off the 2025 season with a fresh reset and runner-up finish at the PRO Superstart Shootout. At the season opening NHRA Gatornationals, he made his debut in the Flexjet Factory Stock Showdown Series. He finished the 2025 season tenth in points.

== Career highlights ==
=== Top Fuel Dragster ===
2026

- Top Fuel Winner at Gainesville, FL - Amalie Oil NHRA Gatornationals

2025

- Top Fuel Runner-Up at Bradenton - PRO Superstar Shootout

==== 2024 ====
- Top Fuel Countdown to a Championship - Qualifier

==== 2023 ====
- Top Fuel Winner at Gainesville, FL - Pep Boys All-Star Callout
- Top Fuel Runner-Up at Chicago - NHRA Route 66 Nationals

==== 2022 ====
- Top Fuel Runner-Up at Norwalk, Ohio - NHRA Summit Equipment Nationals

==== 2021 ====
- Top Fuel Winner at Gainesville, FL - Amalie Oil NHRA Gatornationals
- Top Fuel Winner at Charlotte, NC - Dewalt Tools NHRA Carolina Nationals

=== Top Alcohol Dragster ===
==== 2020 ====
- Top Alcohol Dragster Winner at Baby Gators, Gainesville, FL - Lucas Oil Series
- JEGS Allstar Top Alcohol Dragster Runner-Up at Indianapolis, IN
- Top Alcohol Dragster Runner-Up at NHRA U.S. Nationals

==== 2019 ====
- Top Alcohol Dragster Winner at Baby Gators, Gainesville, FL - Lucas Oil Series
- Top Alcohol Dragster Winner at Epping, NH - Lucas Oil Series
- Top Alcohol Dragster Runner-Up at Atco, NJ - Lucas Oil Series
- Top Alcohol Dragster Winner at Indianapolis, IN - Lucas Oil Series

==== 2018 ====
- Top Alcohol Dragster Runner-Up at Gainesville, FL - NHRA Gatornationals
- Top Alcohol Dragster Winner at Atlanta, GA - NHRA Southern Nationals
- Top Alcohol Dragster Winner at Indianapolis, IN - NHRA U.S. Nationals
- Top Alcohol Dragster Winner at Indianapolis - Lucas Oil Series
- Top Alcohol Dragster Winner at Atco, NJ - Lucas Oil Series
- Top Alcohol Dragster Runner-Up at Epping, NH - Lucas Oil Series
- Top Alcohol Dragster Runner-Up Maple Grove, PA - Lucas Oil Series

==== 2017 ====
- Top Alcohol Dragster Winner at Lebanon Valley, NY - Lucas Oil Series
- Top Alcohol Dragster Winner at Epping, NH - Lucas Oil Series
- Top Alcohol Dragster Winner at Atco, NJ - Lucas Oil Series
- Top Alcohol Dragster Runner-Up at Rising Sun, MD - Lucas Oil Series
- Top Alcohol Dragster Winner at Indianapolis, IN - NHRA U.S. Nationals
- Lucas Oil East Regional Top Alcohol Dragster Points Championship

==== 2016 ====
- Top Alcohol Dragster Winner at Atco, NJ - Lucas Oil Series Top Alcohol Dragster Winner at Bowling Green, KY - Lucas Oil Series
- Top Alcohol Dragster Runner-Up at Charlotte, NC, 4-Wide Nationals
- Top Alcohol Dragster Runner-Up at Epping, N.H. - Lucas Oil Series
