= Tony Pedregon =

American racing driver (born 1965)

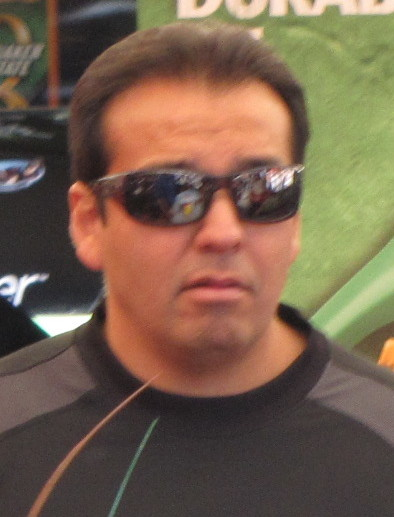
- Pedregon in 2010
- Nationality: American
- Born: Tony Pedregon Lopez; March 8, 1965 (age 61) Torrance, California, U.S.
- Relatives: Cruz Pedregon (brother); Frank Pedregon (father)

NHRA Mello Yello Drag Racing Series
- Years active: 1993 - 2015
- Teams: John Force Racing, Pedregon Racing
- Championships: 2 (FC)
- Wins: 43
- Fastest laps: Best ET; 4.659 seconds

Championship titles
- 2003, 2007: NHRA Funny Car Champion

Awards
- 1996: Automobile Club of Southern California Road to the Future Award
- Statistics up to date as of September 15, 2025.

Tony Pedregon Lopez (born March 8, 1965) is an American two-time NHRA Mello Yello Drag Racing Series Funny Car Champion from Torrance, California. He is also the youngest of the Pedregon brothers. His brother Cruz Pedregon is the 1992 and 2008 NHRA Mello Yello Series Funny Car Champion.

== Racing career ==
=== Early Days ===
In 1993, Pedregon qualified for his first NHRA event driving a Top Fuel Dragster. In 1995, he ran a limited Funny Car Schedule for car owner Larry Minor.

=== John Force Racing Days ===
In 1996, Pedregon made his debut at John Force Racing driving a funny car. In his first season with the team, he made seven final round appearances, winning his first career event at Atlanta and finishing second overall in season points under car owner John Force. He was also named the inaugural winner of the Automobile Club of Southern California Road to the Future Award. In 1997, Tony beat brother Cruz in the first ever funny car final between brothers. He was also the number one qualifier in three events and made it to five finals. In 1998, he won two events in two finals. In 1999, Pedregon was the No.1 qualifier at four events and posted the quickest time in history when he clocked a 4.779 second run at Gainesville Raceway. He was the runner-up in the Funny Car bonus race at Indianapolis. In 2000 Pedregon went to six Finals collecting two wins.

In 2001, Pedregon won at Englishtown after qualifying 1st, a career first. He also won back to back races for the first time in his career. In 2002, he won six times in eight final rounds and finished second in points for the fourth time in his career. He also won three consecutive races for the first time in his career. In 2003, Pedregon finally won the Championship becoming the first driver to win besides John Force since 1992 when brother Cruz won. He also won eight events that season, putting him fourth on the all-time career win list. Pedregon decided at the end of the season to go join brother Cruz and form Pedregon Racing.

=== Pedregon Racing ===
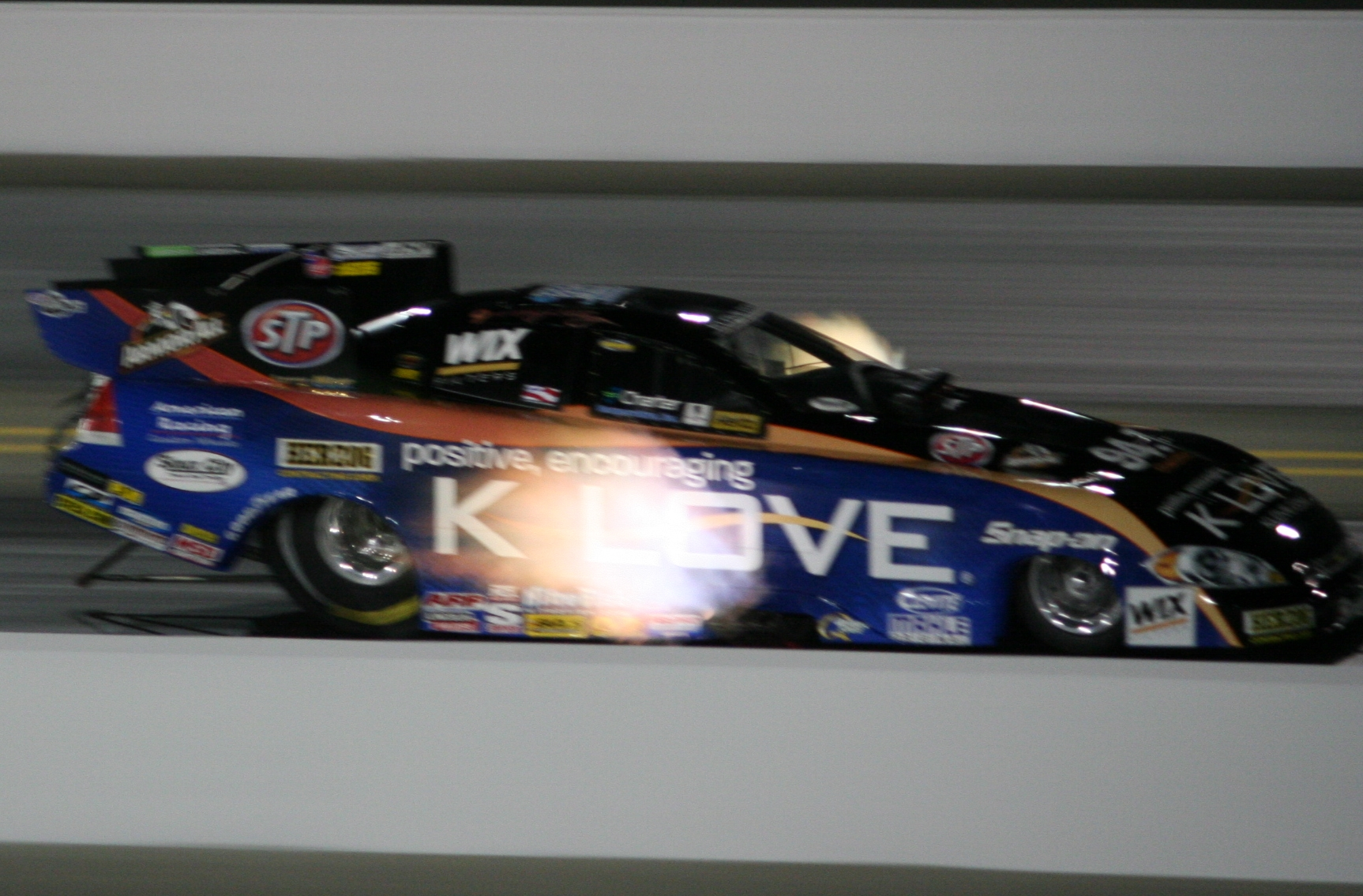
Pedregon at Charlotte in 2011

In his first season as a team owner, Pedregon finished eighth in the final Championship standings, his ninth consecutive season finishing in the top-ten. Pedregon recorded his Career-best E.T. is the seventh quickest Funny Car pass in NHRA history and Recorded two of the ten fastest Funny Car speeds in NHRA history (331.28, Chicago 1; 329.83, Atlanta). His career won-lost record in elimination rounds of 319-189 is 13th-best among all active pro drivers with 50 or more decisions. Was the No. 1 qualifier three times (Las Vegas 1, Atlanta, Chicago 1); Qualified for all 23 events, upping his national event qualifying streak to 87 consecutive races dating back to Bristol 2001, fifth best among all active pro driver. Pedregon joins a short list of only five NHRA Professional drag racers to have ever been nominated for the ESPY Best Driver Award. Joining Pedregon are Tony Schumacher, John Force, Greg Anderson and Melanie Troxel. No drag racer has ever won the ESPY Best Driver Award.

In 2005, Pedregon set career best for time when he and his brother (Cruz) each ran 4.680s at Chicago 2. He finished the season with two wins and a runner-up finish at the final five events. He qualified for all 23 events, increasing his streak of qualifying at national events to 110. He also earned three No. 1 qualifiers and had the low E.T. at three events. In 2006, Pedregon won three events and finished top five in the final points standings. In 2007 Pedregon won his second NHRA Funny Car title winning four events along the way. In 2008 Tony won four events and qualified first in two events and finished fifth in the final points. In 2009 Pedregon won three events and finished sixth in the final points.

On October 29, 1998, Pedregon, sponsored by Castrol Syntec and Action Performance Racing, unveiled a racing car that featured slain Tejano superstar Selena

== Broadcasting career ==
On October 31, 2015, it was announced that Pedregon would join the Fox NHRA broadcast team in 2016 for their NHRA Mello Yello Series coverage.

== Personal life ==
Pedregon resides in Indianapolis, Indiana. He has three children: a daughter named Cecily, and two sons, Desidario and Benecio. He is the son of drag racer "Flamin'" Frank Pedregon. He is of Mexican American descent.
