= Top Alcohol =

Classes in dragster racing

Two different types of Top Alcohol Dragster. Above, T/A injected dragster of Krister Johansson from Sweden; below, the supercharged methanol-burning car of Germany's Dennis Habermann.

Top Alcohol refers to two different classes in professional drag racing: Top Alcohol Dragster and the Top Alcohol Funny Car. Commonly known as "alky" cars, both are akin in design to the premier Top Fuel classes, but less powerful (about 3,500 bhp (2,600 kW; 3,500 PS)). In both classes, the cars are either supercharged ("blown") engines, burning alcohol (methanol) or can burn nitromethane and be normally aspirated, fuel injected engines. Top Alcohol Dragsters and Funny Cars resemble their nitromethane (Fuel) counterparts, with about half the power of their respective classes. Each car uses a three-speed transmission.

Engine displacement is limited to 456 cubic inches for nitromethane engines (with a minimum weight of 2,125 pounds), 466 cubic inches for screw-type superchargers (1,975 pounds), and 528 cubic inches (2,050 pounds) for roots-type superchargers.

The top speed of a blown top alcohol dragster was set on June 14th 2025 at 281.25 mph at mission raceway park.

Top Alcohol was devised in the 1970s as a replacement for the Top Gas class, which was similar but burned gasoline. Initially, alcohol dragsters competed against Funny Cars in a category known as Pro Comp, before a separate class, Top Alcohol Funny Car, was created in the 1980s. It was within IHRA's version of this class use of ethanol fuel was pioneered with great success by Mark Thomas, an Ohio farmer who became a five-time champion within that organization. Despite this, ethanol has failed to capture the imagination of racers; the majority opt for more traditional methanol. Today both Top Alcohol Dragster and Top Alcohol Funny Car compete in NHRA drag racing. They are classed not as professional but as sportsman within the USA but in Europe they are classed as a professional category within the FIA Drag Racing Championships. Top Alcohol classes also compete outside of North America, most notably in Australia and Europe. In Europe they are called Top Methanol Dragsters and Top Methanol Funny Cars.

== See also ==
- E85 ethanol fuel in racing
- Pro Modified
