= 1987 NHRA Winternationals =

National Hot Rod Association
- Location: Auto Club Raceway; Pomona, California

The 1987 NHRA Winternationals (commonly known as the Winternats) were a National Hot Rod Association (NHRA) drag racing event, held at Auto Club Raceway, Pomona, California on 1 February.

Top Fuel began a revival, from what looked like a death knell in 1984, with thirty-two entrants for a sixteen-car Funny Car field, including Kenny Bernstein (in his controversial, and quick, new Budweiser-sponsored Bud King Buick LeSabre), Ed "The Ace" McCulloch, Tom Hoover, Tom "Mongoo$e" McEwen, John Force, and Raymond Beadle. Bernstein's switch to Buick meant Ford's Motorcraft sponsorship would go to the new Candies and Hughes Ford Thunderbird, driven by Mark Oswald.

== Events ==
Top Fuel began a revival, from what looked like a death knell in 1984, with thirty-two entrants for a sixteen-car Funny Car field, including Kenny Bernstein, Ed McCulloch, and Tom McEwen, and Don Prudhomme (who, surprisingly, failed to qualify).

High-mounted wings and cylinder heads milled from billet aluminum were the leading technical highlights.

Maximum qualifying e.t. was 5.60, the quickest yet for a Top Fuel field.

== Results ==
=== Top Fuel Dragster ===
Top Fuel hosted a field of 16, including low e.t. qualifier Hank Endres (driving for John Carey), "Big Daddy" Garlits (qualified #3), Shirley Muldowney (#7 qualifier), Larry Minor (qualified #11), Gene "Snowman" Snow (#2 qualifier), Amato (qualified #6), and Darrell Gwynn (qualified #8).

==== Round One ====
Low e.t. qualifier Hank Endres (turning in a 5.32) eliminated Carey (his car owner, who qualified #9, with a 5.49). #17 qualifier Tom Morgan (stepping in after #12 qualifier Ray Stutz failed to start) lost to #4-qualified Dan Pastorini. Muldowney qualified #7, but lost to Bill Mullins, who qualified #15. Frank Bradley, who qualified #10, lost to #2 qualifier Gene "Snowman" Snow. Minor, #11 qualifier, was eliminated by Garlits (qualified #3). Qualifying #16 (high e.t.), Ed Moore was defeated by #8 qualifier Darrell Gwynn. Denver Schutz, #14 qualifier, lost to Joe Amato, who qualified #6. Dick LaHaie, qualified #5 (driving for Larry Minor), turned in a 5.307 pass to defeat Jack Ostrander, who qualified #13.

==== Round Two ====
Pastorini lost to Gwynn. Amato defeated Snow. Garlits eliminated Mullins. Endres was defeated by LaHaie.

==== Round Three ====
Gwynn lost to Amato, and LaHaie was eliminated by Garlits (5.38 to 5.36 seconds)

==== Final round ====
Garlits recorded a 5.298 at 270 mph (435 km/h) on his final pass of the meet, defeating Amato, who turned in a 5.415. Garlits also had a better reaction time.

=== Top Fuel Funny Car ===
Top Fuel Funny Car began a revival, from what looked like a death knell in 1984, with thirty-two entrants for a sixteen-car field, including Bernstein, McCulloch, Hoover, Force, and Don Prudhomme (who, surprisingly, failed to qualify).

==== Round One ====
Oswald (qualifying #2, at 5.52 seconds and 268 mph (431 km/h)) defeated #10 qualifier Hoover. Force (qualified #9) lost to low-e.t. qualifier Bernstein.

Raymond Beadle, qualified #4, was defeated by #12-qualified Graeme Cowin. Doc Halladay, qualified #8, was beaten by high-e.t. qualifier Tim Grose. #14 qualifier John Martin defeated #6 qualifier Billy Meyer. Steve Hodkinson qualified #15, and eliminated #7 qualifier Johnny West. McEwen qualified #13, and went out in round one.

==== Round Two ====
Grose fell to Cowin, Hodkinson to Pulde. Bernstein trailered McCulloch, and Martin eliminated Oswald.

==== Semi-final round ====
Martin was eliminated by Cowin, Pulde by Bernstein.

==== Final round ====
Cowin faced off against Bernstein, and lost.

=== Pro Stock ===
Bob Glidden debuted a new 1987 Thunderbird with a low-e.t. qualifying pass of 7.425 seconds at 186.76 mph (300.56 km/h). Larry Morgan qualified #16 in an Oldsmobile Firenza (owned by Bob Panella) at 7.57 seconds and 185 mph (298 km/h).

Warren Johnson turned in several 7.4-second passes in a row, and went home having recorded low e.t. and top speed in class of the meet, 7.403 seconds and 188.20 mph (302.88 km/h).

==== Round One ====
Glidden eliminated #9 qualifier Mark Pawuk. Morgan defeated #8 qualifier Joe Lepone. Gary Brown, #15 qualifier, lost to the #7-qualified Firebird of Tony Christian. Bruce Allen qualified #3, but lost to #11 qualifier Don Coonce's Firenza. Johnson qualified #2, and eliminated # qualifier Kenny Delco. Lee Dean qualified #4, only to lose to Darrell Alderman, who qualified #12. Reid Whisnant qualified #13 and lost to #5 qualifier Butch Leal. Steve Schmidt, qualified #12, lost to Gordie Rivera, qualified #6.

==== Round Two ====
Glidden lost in round two to a holeshot by Leal (with a 7.52 e.t. to Glidden's 7.45). Alderman was eliminated by Morgan, Christian by Coonce. Rivera lost to Johnson.

==== Semi-final ====
Morgan faced Johnson, and lost. Leal eliminated Coonce.

==== Final round ====
Johnson took the win.

=== Top Alcohol ===
The TA/D final pitted Denny Lucas against Bill Barney. Lucas's dragster did a wheelstand, yet still managed a pass of 6.312 seconds and 216 mph (348 km/h), exactly to the thousandth the same as Barney's. The win was initially given to Barney, but after examining the videotape recorded by Diamond T Sports, it finally went to Lucas.

Chuck Phelps brought his Bad Moon Rising TA/FC to Pomona; playing Creedence Clearwater Revival in the pits and dressing his crew as werewolves may (or may not) have contributed to his taking the class win.

=== Super Gas ===
Super Gas had fully 62 entrants. The class was won by Ed Sellnow, in a small-block Camaro.

=== Competition Eliminator ===
The field was 49 cars. Frank Parks qualified #15 in a C/ED, owned by Todd Patterson; Parks was eliminated in Round Three. The class was won by a B/Econo Altered Opel, owned and driven by Patterson.

=== Stock ===
The Stock final matched Norm Rollings (of Pomona, in a Corvette (his first national event) lost to Harry Axemaker, in a G/SA 1971 Firebird; it would be his first class win in eighteen years of trying.

== Sources ==
- Baskerville, Gray. "Winter Heat: Leave it to Leavers", in Hot Rod, May 1987, pp. 90–91.
- Danh, Philippe. "Winter Heat: Life on the Starting Line", in Hot Rod, May 1987, p. 92.
- Ganahl, Pat. "Winter Heat: '87 NHRA Wnternationals", in Hot Rod, May 1987, pp. 88–89.
