= Gary Dyer =

American businessman and drag racer

- Born: 1934 (age 91–92) Mankato, Minnesota, U.S.
- Years active: 1964–1974
- Teams: Marauders, Inc. (1963–1964); Grand Spaulding (1964–1974)

Championship titles
- 1969: Cavalcade of Stars

Awards
- 2025 2020 2020 2020: International Drag Racing Hall of Fame; Biloxi Dragway Hall of Fame; Drag Racing Hall of Fame; Mopar Hall of Fame

Gary Dyer (born 1934) is an American businessman and drag racing driver. He was one of the discipline's most notable drivers in the 1960s, who developed the Funny Car class.

His company, Dyer's Machine Service Inc., builds supercharger kits for cars under the Dyer's Blowers name.

== Career ==
While attending Argo Community High School in Summit, Illinois, Dyer and his friends John Farkonas and Pat Minick expressed interest in drag racing. Dyer purchased a 1956 Chevrolet shortly after graduation, and the three began racing on a decommissioned airstrip in Half Day, Illinois that had been converted into a quarter-mile drag strip. He also drove a Ford coupe with a Cadillac engine at local tracks and other gas-powered coupes.

In late 1963, Dyer started racing an A/FX (A/Factory Experimental) Mercury Comet from Marauders, Inc., an auto club in Chicago run by Edward Rachanski. With the Comet, he set the world record for fastest time in a Super Stock drag racer when he reached 130.44 miles per hour (209.92 km/h) in 10.75 seconds down Oswego Drag Raceway; his previous best with the Comet was 128 mph in 11.02 seconds at Lake Geneva Raceway.

Dyer befriended Dodge dealer Norman "Mr. Norm" Kraus in the summer of 1964, who fielded cars in the Super Stock class but wished to move into FX racing because he did not want to compete against his customers at Grand Spaulding dealership. The partnership reunited him with Farkonas and Minick, who raced for Grand Spaulding in Super Stock. Dyer and Kraus developed the "Flying Ram", a supercharged 1965 Dodge that had an altered wheelbase and an injected engine. The car's supercharger and engine were built by Dyer. It originally used gasoline before switching to nitromethane, which increased its performance to match that of the superior Mercury cars.

At the end of 1965, Dyer acquired an altered-wheelbase Dodge Coronet, nicknamed "Color Me Gone", from Roger Lindamood. Dyer installed a new engine and upgraded the chassis, greatly improving its pace. It was one of the sport's early examples of a Funny Car, setting the fastest time among such cars in 1965 at Lions Drag Strip of 8.63 seconds at 163 mph (262 km/h).

Since Dyer drove a Dodge, he was involved in feuds with drivers from rival manufacturers throughout the 1960s, particularly Arnie Beswick and Don Gay from Pontiac. He and Beswick were scheduled to race each other for the first time at the 1965 World Series of Drag Racing, though Dyer withdrew due to a rear axle problem. Future matchups across the decade prompted Dyer to proclaim he would "put that Pontiac-driving farmer right back on his tractor." Kraus was also outspoken about Beswick, leading to a "spirited rivalry" between him and Gay; although Dyer directly faced Gay in races, Kraus' name was typically featured on promotional material that highlighted the feud. By 1969, the grudge escalated to where the Amarillo Globe-Times remarked that Dyer and Kraus would "rather whip Texans (Gay was from League City, Texas) and Pontiacs than Californians and Fords, which are their primary adversaries for the racing dollar."

A new Charger-bodied Funny Car designed by Dyer and built by Race Car Specialties under the direction of Frank Huszar, nicknamed the "Mini Charger" because it was ten inches narrower than the stock model, was introduced for the 1968 season. The rear end broke during a practice run at its debut round at Cordova Dragway. In June, the Mini Charger won three times in a row at KK Sports Arena, where he also set the track record of 7.76 seconds. However, it was destroyed in a fire at 30 Dragway when an oil filter broke off the engine following a 7.47-second run at 196 mph (315 km/h). He underwent eight months of treatment for burns, during which Kenny Stafford replaced him.

Dyer and Kraus developed a new Charger for 1969 that used a chassis from Logghe Stamping Company, dubbed "Band Aid" to hide a newly attached front end. Competing in the Coca-Cola Funny Car Cavalcade of Stars, Dyer won 11 races and the championship. He also recorded track records at Lebanon Valley Dragway (7.26 seconds) and KK Sports Arena (7.43 seconds). During the year, Dyer established Dyer's Blowers to build superchargers for drag racing teams; he previously received automotive aftermarket parts from the West Coast, but high costs and shipping delays to the Midwest prompted him to start his own company.

Dyer semi-retired from racing in 1970 to focus on his business before resuming his career the following year. For the 1971 and 1972 seasons, he raced a Dodge Challenger Funny Car from Krause that ran as quick as 237.46 mph (382.15 km/h). Dyer later became the Challenger's crew chief for Safford. He also ran a Hemi Colt Pro Stock in races outside of the National Hot Rod Association sanction, where such cars were illegal.

Dyer retired for good after 1973 to prioritize Dyer's Blowers. Also known as Dyer's Machine Service Inc., the company was originally headquartered in Bridgeview before moving to a larger facility in Summit when he retired.

== Legacy ==
Dyer is regarded as a pioneer in Funny Car racing. The Plain Dealer wrote in 1971, "The Funny Car, as it is called in the jargon of Drag Racing fans, was the brainchild of Gary Dyer from Chicago, who had no way of knowing his creation would enjoy the greatest popularity of all drag racing divisions."

Kraus described Dyer as "a genius" with "golden hands, a golden mind. Everything he touched, he was a very dedicated, responsible car guy." Their 1965 Dodge was not considered by Greg Zyla as a "real" Funny Car, which did not start appearing until 1966, though was a precursor to the category. The Dodge, along with other cars in the class, grew in popularity for their resemblance to stock drag racers while being as fast as dragsters. Dyer explained in 1969 that Funny Cars are beloved by fans because "they can identify with them even though they're altered. A guy sits in the stands and he hollers, 'Hey, there goes a Ford just like mine.'"

In 2020, Dyer was inducted into the Drag Racing Hall of Fame, Biloxi Dragway's Hall of Fame, and Mopar Hall of Fame. He was also part of the 2025 class for the Don Garlits Museum of Drag Racing's International Drag Racing Hall of Fame.

== Personal life ==
Dyer was born and raised in Mankato, Minnesota, before moving to Illinois.
