= Selinsgrove Speedway =

Motorsport track in Pennsylvania, United States

The fastest half-mile on the east coast.
- Location: Snyder County, Pennsylvania, U.S.
- Coordinates: 40°47′14″N 76°52′13″W
- Capacity: 5,500
- Owner: Selinsgrove Fair Association
- Operator: SCD Management Group, LLC
- Broke ground: 1946
- Opened: 1946
- Architect: Joie Chitwood
- Major events: Short Track Super Series Icebreaker, Ray Tilley Classic, Ron Keister Memorial, Kramer Cup, Joe Whitcomb Memorial, PA Speedweek Opperman-Bogar-Heintzelman Memorial, Jack Gunn Memorial, Jim Nace Memorial National Open.
- Website: Website

Oval
- Surface: Clay
- Length: 0.500 mi (0.805 km)
- Turns: 4
- Banking: Turns: 9° Straights: 3°

Selinsgrove Speedway (nicknamed The Fastest Half-Mile on The East Coast, Auto Racing's Showcase since 1946) is a 0.5 mi (0.80 km) high-banked clay dirt oval south of Selinsgrove, Pennsylvania.

== History ==
Selinsgrove Speedway was built in 1945 under the supervision of Joie Chitwood, a Hollywood stunt man and race car driver from Denison, Texas. The land had previously been a family farm owned by the Allison and Davis families of Snyder County. They sold it to the Dauntless Hook and Ladder Volunteer Fire Department of Selinsgrove in 1941 as a permanent home for the fire company's annual carnival. The first race was held on July 20, 1946, as an American Automobile Association-sanctioned event promoted by Sam Nunis. The winner was Bill Holland, who would go on to win the Indianapolis 500 in 1949. Placing second was Red Byron, who won the first NASCAR-sanctioned race ever, held on February 15, 1948, at the Daytona Beach Road Course and would go on to become the first champion of the NASCAR's Strictly Stock division, now known as the Monster Energy NASCAR Cup Series.

The grandstand at Selinsgrove Speedway was constructed in 1948. Still standing as of 2022, the grandstands were built from 175,000 board feet (400 m³) of lumber with a capacity of 5,500 spectators. Lights for night racing were added in 1953 with the first night race held on June 19, 1953.

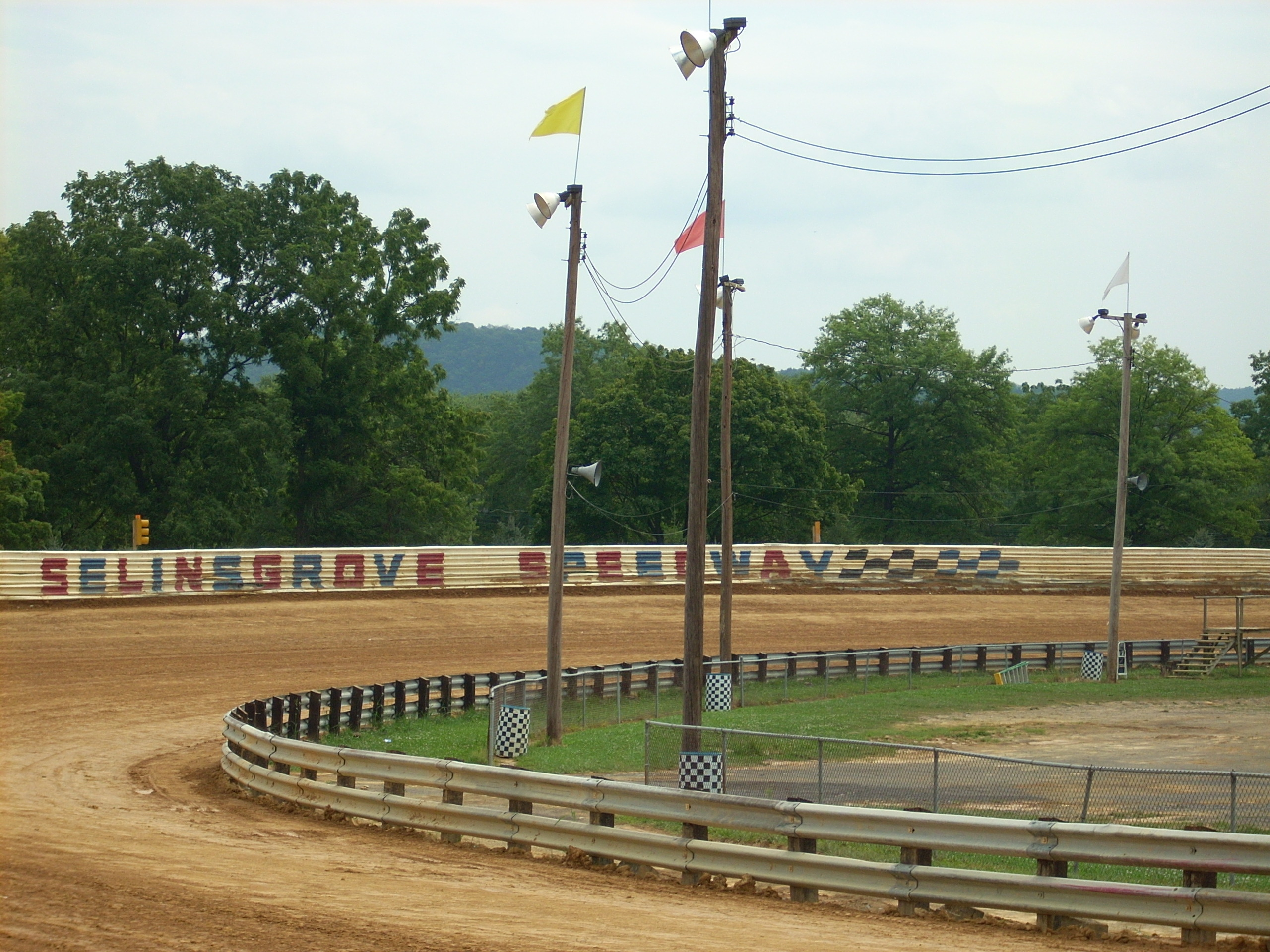
Another view of Selinsgrove Speedway

Selinsgrove Speedway began hosting weekly events in 1950, under the promotion of George "Buster" Keller. Weekly racing continued until 1959, when the action at the track slowed to occasional races. In 1963, weekly racing resumed once again. Chris Economaki, a pioneer of motorsports writing, served as the track announcer during the early 1950s. The track continued to expand its operation over the years and was managed by several promoters including Hall of Fame promoter Jack Gunn(ne John Gunnels), and from 2001 thru 2015 Charlie Paige who directed vast improvements and expansion at Selinsgrove Speedway. New concession stands were built along with new restrooms and V.I.P. facilities. The smaller Selinsgrove Raceway Park was built in the infield in 2001 and the backstretch and turns 1 and 3 were widened in 2006.

As of 2020 the property is still owned by the Selinsgrove Fair Association with racing conducted under the SCD Management Group, LLC banner.

With the advent of larger race car haulers, the pit area, formerly located in the infield, was moved to the outside of turn 4 for the 2018 season, improving the view of the track for spectators. In 2020, the United States Auto Club held its first Silvercrown race at the track. It was named the Bill Holland Classic after the track's first winner and it was 74 laps in length as it was the 74th anniversary since his win.

== Selinsgrove Open ==
The track started the sprint car racing special event in 1983. The event was won by 1984 track champion Maynard Yingst. Yingst won the event in 1984 and 1985 before becoming the national championship winning Funny Car crew chief for 1989 NHRA driver Bruce Larson. Several national sprint car drivers have won the event, including Dave Blaney, Sammy Swindell, and Greg Hodnett.

- 1983 - Maynard Yingst
- 1984 - Maynard Yingst
- 1985 - Maynard Yingst
- 1986 - Don Kreitz Jr.
- 1987 - Dave Blaney
- 1988 - Keith Kauffman
- 1989 - Doug Wolfgang
- 1990 - Sammy Swindell
- 1991 - Johnny Mackison
- 1992 - Don Kreitz Jr.
- 1993 - Todd Shaffer
- 1994 - Todd Shaffer
- 1995 - Fred Rahmer
- 1996 - Fred Rahmer
- 1997 - Fred Rahmer
- 1998 - Greg Hodnett
- 1999 - Fred Rahmer
- 2000 - Fred Rahmer
- 2001 - Todd Shaffer
- 2002 - Lance Dewease
- 2003 - Stevie Smith
- 2004 - Greg Hodnett
- 2005 - Lucas Wolfe
- 2006 - Chad Layton
- 2007 - Greg Hodnett
- 2008 - Todd Shaffer
- 2009 - Lance Dewease
- 2010 - Lance Dewease
- 2011 - Pat Cannon
- 2012 - Pat Cannon
- 2013 - Pat Cannon
- 2014 - Greg Hodnett
- 2015 - Danny Dietrich
- 2016 - Lucas Wolfe
- 2017 - Brian Brown
- 2018 - Ryan Smith
- 2019 - Logan Wagner
- 2020 - Anthony Macri
- 2021 - Anthony Macri
- 2022 - Anthony Macri
- 2023 - Brent Marks
- 2025* - Anthony Macri

* Speedway did not operate a full season in 2024. Winner's List Source:

== Racing Series ==
The following racing series have run events at Selinsgrove Speedway since 1946.

- The All Star Circuit of Champions (ASCoC)
- American Automobile Association (AAA) Sprints
- American Racing Club (ARC) Midgets
- American Racing Drivers Club (ARDC) Midgets
- American Sprint Car Series (ASCS)
- Automobile Racing Club of America (ARCA) Stock Cars
- Central States Racing Association Midgets
- Empire State Sprints, Empire Super Sprints (ESS)
- Modcar Modifieds
- National Auto Racing Association (NARA) Sprints
- National Sprint Tour (NST)
- PASS/IMCA 305 Sprint Cars
- Patriot Sprint Tour (PST)
- Penn-Jersey Sprint Association
- Penn-Mar Racing Association Stock Cars
- Pennsylvania Speedweek
- Race of Champions Modifieds (RoC)
- SCODA Sports Stock Cars
- Super Midget Racing Club (SMRC)
- Super Sportsman
- Tri County Stockcars
- United Racing Club (URC) Limited Sprints
- United Sprint Association
- USAC National Midgets
- USAC Silver Crown
- World of Outlaws
