= Rambunctious (Funny Car) =

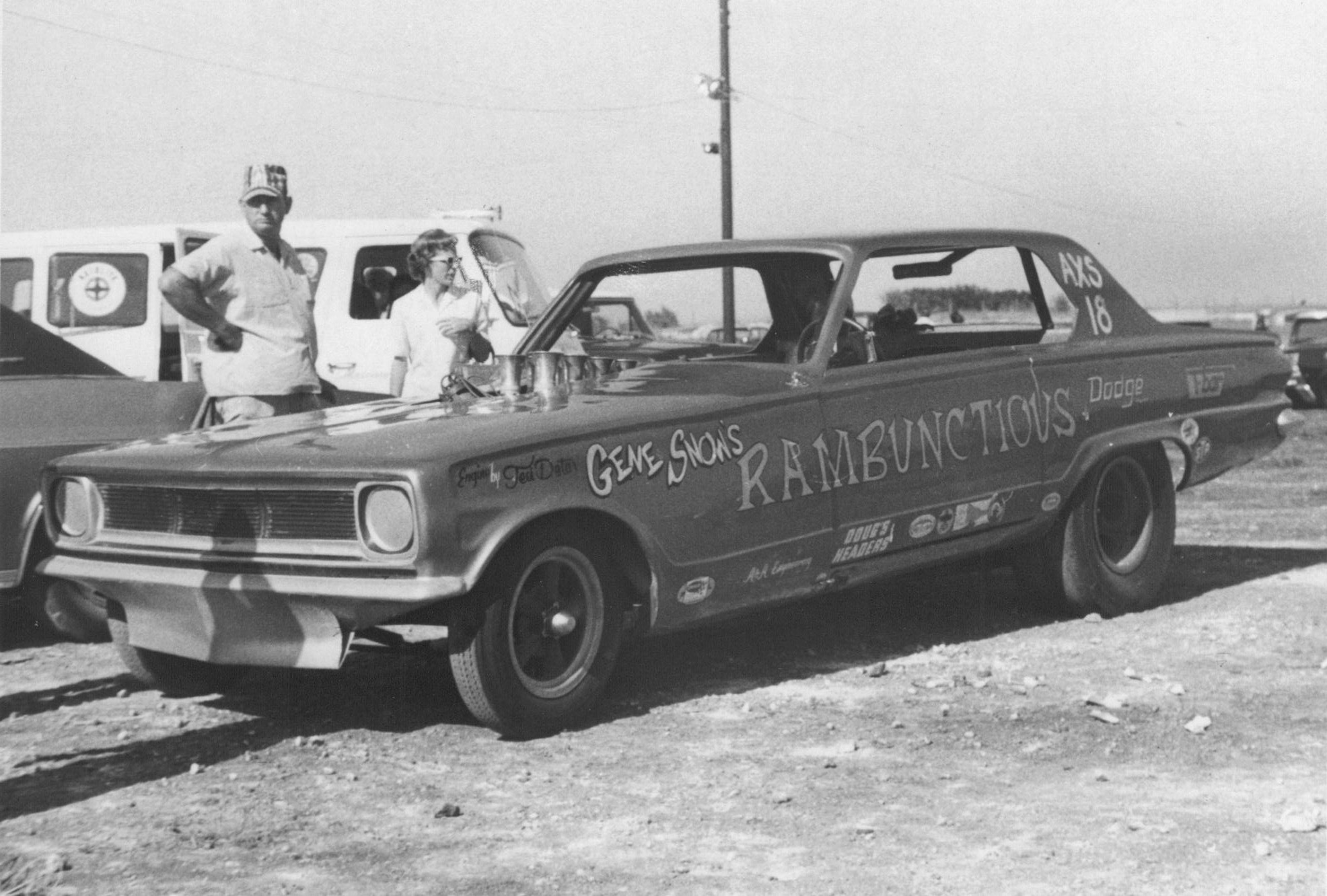

Overview
- Production: 1969

Body and chassis
- Class: Top Fuel
- Body style: Funny Car

Rambunctious is a historic funny car.

Debuting in 1969, Rambunctious is a reproduction 1969 Dodge Charger on a Logghe Stamping Company chassis. It became one of the most famous (and popular) funny cars in NHRA history. It would record NHRA's first official 200 mph (320 km/h) pass, driven by Gene Snow and powered by a Keith Black-prepared Chrysler hemi.

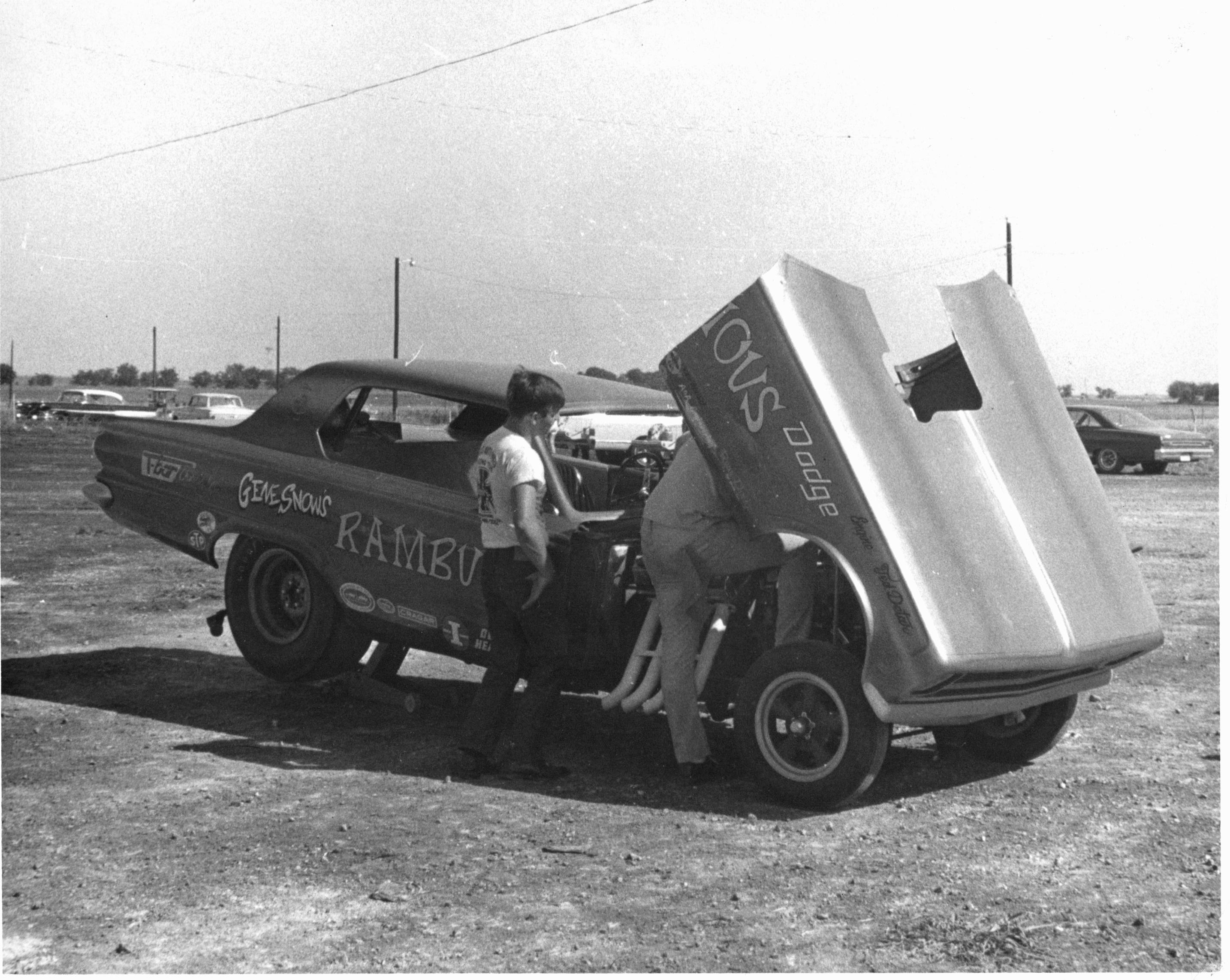

== Sources ==
- McClurg, Bob. “50 Years of Funny Cars: Part 2” in Drag Racer, November 2016, pp. 35–50.
