= Brutus (Funny Car) =

Pioneering funny car

Overview
- Manufacturer: Lew Arrington
- Production: c. 1965
- Designer: Jim Liberman

Body and chassis
- Body style: Funny Car

Powertrain
- Engine: Pontiac hemi

Brutus is a pioneering funny car driven by Jim Liberman and prepared by crew chief Lew Arrington in the mid-1960s.

Liberman and Arrington made a deal with Pontiac to supply Drarare hemis (remnants of Mickey Thompson's gas dragster program). Brutus was sponsored by Larry Hopkins Pontiac in Sunnyvale, California, and Goodies Speed Shop, and ran a 6-71 Jimmy blower, Venolia pistons, Crane cam, and Mondello conrods.
