= Maynard Yingst =

American racer and crew chief

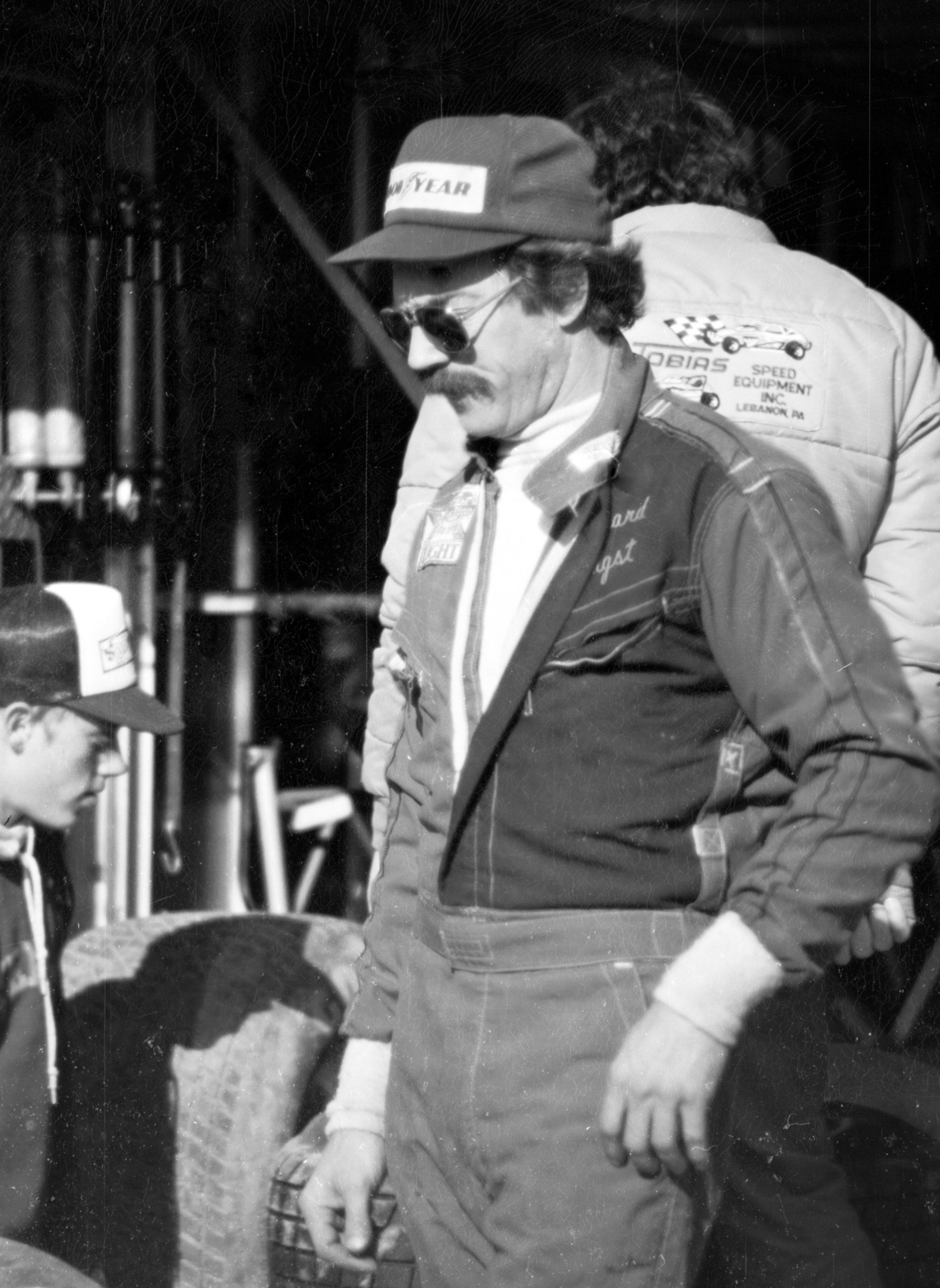
Yingst in the pits with his sprint car in 1985.

Maynard K. Yingst (October 10, 1949 – March 6, 1993) was an American racer and crew chief from Linglestown, Pennsylvania. He quit his sprint car racing career to become the crew chief for Bruce Larson's 1989 national championship Funny Car drag racing team. He was nicknamed "The Linglestown Leadfoot".

== Racing career ==
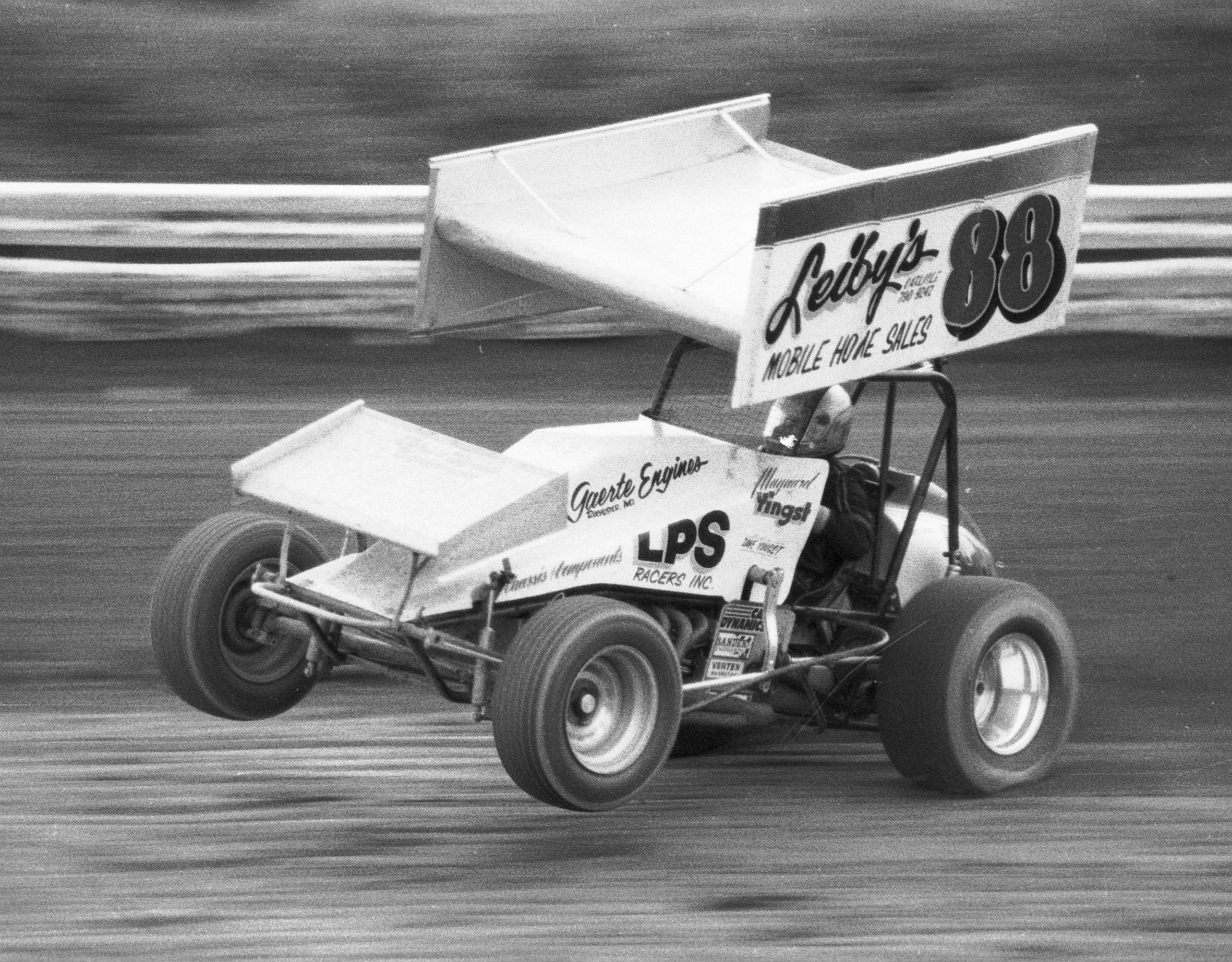
Yingst doing a wheelie in his sprint car

Yingst was a sprint car racer in Central Pennsylvania. He had won six features at Williams Grove Speedway. In 1984, he won the 410 Sprint car championship at Selinsgrove Speedway. Yingst won the inaugural Selinsgrove Open sprint car racing in 1983, and he repeated as the special event champion in 1984 and 1985. He usually raced with a white #88 racecar.

== Crew chief ==
After taking some time off, fellow Pennsylvanian racer Bruce Larson wanted to return to drag racing in the National Hot Rod Association (NHRA) after a long career as a match racer. Yingst quit his sprint car racing career to become Larson's crew chief in NHRA's Funny Car division. Larson won the 1989 NHRA Funny Car title after winning six national events (the Winternationals, Springnationals, Mile-High nationals, Seafair Nationals, Fallnationals and the NHRA Winston Finals) and finishing second at five more events. He worked for "Flash Gordon" Mineo in the 1991 season, entering five national events. He was hired by Chuck Etchells in 1992 to be his crew chief, and Etchells had three events wins to finish fifth in the season points.

== Death ==
Yingst was working in the pits at Houston Raceway Park on March 6, 1993 at the NHRA Slick 50 Nationals when he collapsed and died from a brain aneurysm. "We were devastated," said Etchells. "Maynard was only 43 and was at the top of his profession. My feeling at the time-was not that we had lost a crew chief but a very dear friend who was like a father to all of the guys on the crew." Williams Grove Speedway started a "Maynard Yingst Memorial" sprint car race after his death.
