= Bob Tasca III =

American NHRA Funny Car driver

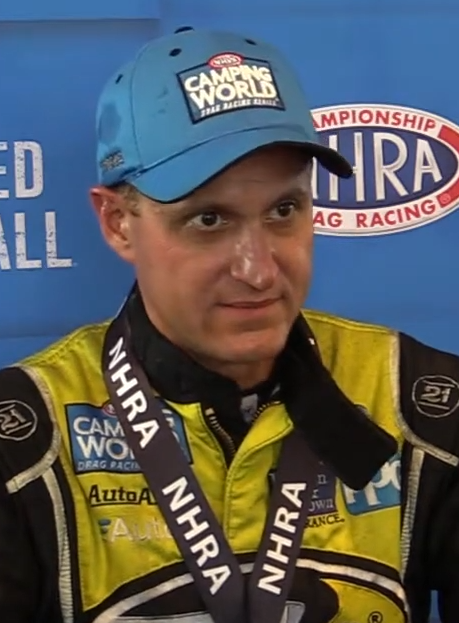
- Tasca in 2022
- Born: 14 October 1975 (age 51); United States
- Occupations: NHRA team driver and owner
- Known for: First to exceed 340 mph (550 km/h) in a wheel-driven Funny Car
- Height: 6 ft (1.8 m)
- Children: 4
- Relatives: Bob Tasca Sr. (grandfather)

NHRA Top Alcohol Funny Car Series
- Years active: 2008—2026
- Teams: Tasca Racing
- Wins: 18
- Fastest laps: Career Best ET; 3.822 seconds; Career Best Speed; 338.77 mph (545.20 km/h)
- Best finish: 3rd in 2023
- Statistics up to date as of January 30, 2026.

Bob Tasca III is an American Funny Car driver and National Hot Rod Association (NHRA) team owner. He is notable for becoming the first drag racer to break the 340-mile-per-hour (550 km/h) barrier in a wheel-driven Funny Car, along with multiple national event wins and media coverage for his Ford Mustang efforts. Tasca was active as a driver from 2008 until early 2026 when he retired to become a team owner.

== Biography ==
Tasca's funny car at ZMax Dragway in 2010

Tasca lives in Hope, Rhode Island. He is the grandson of Bob Tasca Sr., founder of Tasca Ford in Rhode Island, who was instrumental in the development of the original Ford Mustang Cobra Jet.

Tasca entered Funny Car competition in 2008 with backing from Ford and Motorcraft/Quick Lane. He became the first drag racer to eclipse 340 miles per hour (550 km/h) in a wheel-driven Funny Car, recording a speed of 341.68 miles per hour (549.88 km/h) during a qualifying run at the Pro Superstar Shootout in Bradenton Motorsports Park in February 2024.

Tasca has added wins in NHRA national events, including the Gatornationals, the Carolina Nationals, and multiple events in Las Vegas. In 2023, Tasca led the Funny Car standings and emphasized his aggressive approach. In 2025, Tasca was critical of Fox Sports' media coverage of NHRA – Fox Sports claimed that IndyCar was the “Fastest Racing on Earth". In interviews, he shared insights into his family heritage, team dynamics, and quest for speed. Tasca retired as a driver in 2026; in favor of team ownership; with Austin Prock becoming lead driver for Tasca's Ford team.
