= Big Al II =

Overview
- Production: 1963
- Designer: Jim Lytle

Body and chassis
- Body style: Funny Car
- Layout: Rear-wheel-drive
- Platform: Ford Tudor
- Related: All funny cars

Powertrain
- Engine: Allison V-1710

Big Al II is a pioneering funny car built in 1963 by Jim Lytle. It started the trend to flip-top fiberglass 'flopper' bodies.

Lytle's chopped '34 Tudor project cost US$2000, and was powered by an Allison V-1710. The body was hand made.

Big Al II ran three times, all in 1964 at Lion's Dragway, setting a record for full-bodied drag racers, before being retired.

The idea was copied by Ford and Mercury for their Mercury Comet Cyclones. It would inspire "every flopper body ever formed".

== Sources ==
- Wallace, Dave (November 2016). "50 Years of Funny Cars". Drag Racer. pp. 24, 26.
