= Scrimaliner =

Overview
- Manufacturer: Ronnie Scrima and George Bacilek
- Designer: Ronnie Scrima (chassis), Bob Sorrell (body)

Body and chassis
- Class: Top Fuel
- Body style: Slingshot streamliner dragster

Powertrain
- Engine: 392 cu in (6,420 cc) Chrysler hemi

Dimensions
- Curb weight: 1,600 lb (730 kg)

Scrimaliner is a streamliner slingshot dragster.

Designed by Ronnie Scrima, Scrimaliner was built by Scrima and George Bacilek, with the aluminum body hammered by Bob Sorrell, painted metalflake red. There was a small wing between the bicycle wheels, and the cockpit was fully enclosed. The 392 cu in (6,420 cc) Chrysler hemi was built by Milodon's Don Alderson. She weighed in at 1,600 lb (730 kg), "one of the heaviest dragsters at that time".

She first appeared at Lions Dragway in August 1964, driven by Roy "Goober" Tuller.

Scrimaliner turned in a best pass of 8.14 seconds at 202 mph (325 km/h).

== Bibliography ==
- Taylor, Thom. "Beauty Beyond the Twilight Zone" in Hot Rod, April 2017, pp. 30–43.
