= Biloxi Dragway =

Drag strip in Mississippi

The Biloxi Dragway was a NHRA/AHRA-sanctioned Quarter-Mile Drag Strip located in Biloxi, Mississippi, United States and operated from August 18, 1957 to July 1, 1967.

== History ==
Many drag racing pioneers raced at Biloxi. "Big Daddy" Don Garlits, Tommy Ivo, Art Arfons, Chris Karamesines, Ronnie Sox, and Mr. Norm's Grand Spaulding Dodge. Locals, Paul VanderLey, Candies & Wale / Hughes, and Joe Teuton. 101 Hall of Fame associations are currently documented with the Biloxi Dragway.

Built by Earl C. Nolan for $30,000, the strip operated under the name of the "Gulf Coast Drag Strip" from 1957-1964. On May 8, 1960 an incident took place with a dragster crashing in to the fence toward Hwy 67 caused the ownership to change hands, with events being canceled in 1962. From 1962 Harvey & Bill Walther operated the venue till its closure in 1967.

Early on Keesler field men under the name "Keesler Coasters" competed in a dragster representing Keesler Air Force Base.

On Dec 22, 1963 A Nationally Ranked Match for Drag News took place for number 4 in the United States. Albert Waits vs Vance Hunt.

Many Championship Events were held at the dragway, such as the yearly Mississippi State Championship, three Gasser Championships, and a B/Stock Championship.

Classes included: Motorcycles, Gassers, Super Stock, Funny Cars, and Dragsters

Since 2006 Gulf Coast Historian Michael "Cory" Evans has extensively researched the history of the Biloxi Dragway. Local and national racers have since shared there experiences for the website, and upcoming book. In 2018 Cory Evans recreated the Biloxi Dragway for the video game BeamNG.drive as it appeared in 1967.
