= Bruce Larson (racing driver) =

American drag racer

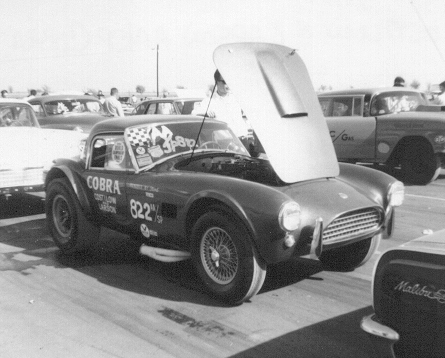
1960s Cobra dragster

Bruce Larson (1937) is an American retired drag racer from Camp Hill, Pennsylvania. He became nationally known for his match races. He quit funny Car racing in 1972 after a bad fire and raced in the Pro Stock class for 2 years. He then returned to the Funny Car class and match racing until 1987 where he fought his way to the NHRA Funny Car Championship in 1989. He led the points chase from start to finish collecting 6 National Event wins, 5 runner ups and the Car Craft Funny Car Driver of the Year award. That championship car is now one of only 2 drag race cars in the collection of the Smithsonian Institution, the other being Don Garlits' rear engine dragster. He was inducted into the International Drag Racing Hall of Fame in 2006. Larson is remembered for his red, white, and blue USA-1 Chevrolet Camaros.

== Racing career ==
Larson began drag racing as a 16-year-old at Linden, New Jersey in a chopped fenderless 1932 Ford coupe. Over the next ten years, he consistently won at local tracks using that car and later a 1954 Oldsmobile and a 1932 Chevrolet A/Gas coupe. In 1965, he switched from the coupes to a 1963 Ford Cobra and immediately set records in NHRA's A/Sport and AA/Sport classes. He used the car to win the NHRA Winternationals, Springnationals, and U.S. Nationals. Larson was working at a Chevrolet dealership at the time and he formed a Chevrolet-based Funny Car team with Greg Sutliff, the dealership's owner. They built a fiberglass-bodied 1966 Chevrolet Chevelle and toured the country in match races. Larson had a 7.41-second run in 1968 in his Logghe Camaro which broke the all-time Funny Car elapsed time (e.t.) record. In 1969, he received national recognition when he won the Super Stock Nationals at York, Pennsylvania. He added a "USA-1" license plate to his Chevrolets, painted the dragster car red, white, and blue and added "USA-1" decals to the side.

Larson did not have a major sponsor until he found Datcon/Sentry in 1985. In 1988, he switched from Chevrolet to Oldsmobile and teamed up with world champion Joe Amato. The two shared information. Larson won his first national funny car win at the Cajun Nationals. Larson hired Pennsylvania sprint car racer Maynard Yingst as his crew chief to tune and set up the car and moved Don Milletics to the chief engineer position. Larson started 1989 by winning the Winternationals. He won at Springnationals, Mile-High nationals, Seafair nationals, Fallnationals, and the Winston Finals, plus finished second at five additional events. He led the season points standings from start to finish to claim the 1989 NHRA Funny Car national championship. He was voted Car Craft magazine's Funny Car Driver of the Year.

Larson raced his first Top Fuel car in June 1992. He took over "Big Daddy" Don Garlits' car and won 4 IHRA National events when Garlits retired due to a detached retina. Garlits closed his operation in 1995. Larson helped Garlits work on his dragster during his 2002 comeback.

== Awards ==
Larson was inducted in numerous Halls of Fame. Don Garlits' International Drag Racing Hall of Fame inducted Larson in 2006. Larson was inducted in the East Coast Drag Times Hall of Fame in 2003, and the Eastern Motorsports Press Association Hall of Fame in 2004, the Pennsylvania Sports Hall of Fame in 1993, and the Super Stock Magazine Drag Racing Hall of Fame in 1995.

Other awards that Larson received during his career include: the Al Holbert Memorial Award, the 1989 Car Craft magazine Driver of the year, the 1989 Eastern Motorsport Press Association Driver of the Year, 1980 Jungle Jim Liberman Memorial Award, and the '89 NHRA Northeast Division N.E.D. of the Year Award.
