= Ronnie Scrima =

Ronnie Scrima is an American dragster and funny car chassis builder.

He was responsible for the streamliner slingshot dragster Scrimaliner in 1964.

After Logghe Bros. (based in Detroit) proved unable to keep up with demand, a funny car chassis-building industry developed. Scrima joined several others in the business.

Scrima founded Exhibition Engineering, and built both "dune buggy"- and fueler"-style funny car chassis.

He also built Travelin' Javelin, a 426 hemi-powered '69 Javelin Funny Car, for car owner Gary Crane, to be driven by the then up-and-coming Dale Armstrong.

== Sources ==
- McClurg, Bob. "50 Years of Funny Cars: Part 2" in Drag Racer, November 2016, pp. 35–50.
- Taylor, Thom. "Beauty Beyond the Twilight Zone" in Hot Rod, April 2017, pp. 30-43.
- Burgess, Phil, NHRA National Dragster Editor. ”A history of AMC Funny Cars” written 16 May 2014. NHRA.com (retrieved 23 May 2017)
