= Pat Minick =

American drag racer

Pat Minick (born December 31, 1937 - January 19, 2017) was an American drag racer.

== History ==
Minick got his start in the 1950s, driving Chrysler products; he first partnered with John Farkonas (who was seven years Minick's senior) in the 1960s. Minick first drove Farkonas' 1956 Chrysler 300, and in 1962, they raced in Super Stock, taking wins in 31 of 33 events. They attracted sponsorship from "Mr. Norm" Kraus' car dealership, Grand Spaulding Dodge, in 1964, naming their new car Hustler. They followed this with an altered-wheelbase blown nitro-burning 1965 Plymouth. The team got clutch work done at Chicago's E&R Automotive, where hemi-running fellow Super Stock racer Austin Coil was also a customer. Needing a good tuner, while Coil needed money to keep racing, the trio joined forces in winter 1966.

In 1967, they decided to move from Super Stock to Funny Car (not yet an official NHRA class), building the first Chi-Town Hustler (a name conceived by Minick in 1966, but never attached to their Super Stock car), a tube-chassis 1967 Barracuda, "in the garage of Farkonas’ mother".

Minick would only remain at the wheel of Chi-Town Hustler until 1971, putting a stylistic stamp on the car that remained in fan memory even after he quit the team. When Minick quit, he was replaced by Clare Sanders.

Coil credits Minick with being the best of his era at controlling an automatic transmission car.

Minick also served as the team's business manager, arranging race bookings. After he stopped driving Chi-Town Hustler Minick also stopped attending distant races.

== Private life ==
Minick had a son, Wayne, who is also a racer, who took over Chi-Town Hustler after Hawley and Coil left the team.
