= Max Wedge =

Former car engine

The Max Wedge, formally the Maximum Performance Wedge, was an engine option produced by the Chrysler Corporation from 1962 to 1964, that was available exclusively in B Platform (intermediate) Dodges and Plymouths. The Max Wedge motor used the Chrysler RB Block, and was produced in 413 and 426 cubic-inch iterations. The 1962 Max Wedge Dodges and Plymouths, which offered a high-performance big-block engine in an intermediate-bodied vehicle, may be regarded as examples of a proto-muscle car.

== History ==
Beginning in 1951, Chrysler's primary V8 engine was its 331 c.i. Hemi. In 1958, Chrysler introduced its new wedge-head B Block engine, which was implemented in the Dodge and DeSoto lines. The following year saw the introduction of the RB Block in Chryslers and Imperials; this was a modified B Block with a raised deck resulting in an increase of stroke from 3.18 inches to 3.75 inches. In 1960 and 1961, Chrysler began offering RB-engine vehicles with its new "cross ram" induction system that had been designed by Tom Hoover inspired by his experiment while he was a member of the Ramchargers Club where he and other Chrysler engineers worked on High and mighty. This car sported trumpet like exhaust and an intake manifold that stuck far out of the hood, thus greatly increasing the length of the intake runners. This style of intake manifold was later dubbed the tunnel ram. Following that experiment, he designed an intake manifold for the Chrysler B engine that had sat the carburetors on opposing sides, just above the valve covers. This intake design was named the "Long Ram Induction". Using principles from both the tunnel ram and the long ram, Chrysler engineers came up with the "short ram" which essentially was a box that sat atop the motor with carburetors on opposite corners. This design allowed for much greater airflow capacity than the designs that preceded.

In 1962, Chrysler introduced its new high-performance version of the 413 RB Block motor: the Maximum Performance Wedge. This engine had been in development since 1959 and employed their "short ram" induction. The "Max Wedge" option was available exclusively in Chrysler's new-for-1962 intermediate B Platform in Dodges and Plymouths only. Chrysler had developed the option in part to capitalize on the rising popularity in NHRA super stock racing. Although Max Wedge cars were street legal, they were intended for racing purposes.

First-year Max Wedge engines were 413 cubic inches and came in 410 and 420 horsepower versions. Dodge called its engine the "Ramcharger 413" while Plymouth called it the "Super Stock 413." In 1963, the engine's displacement increased to 426 cubic inches as the bore was increased from 4.19 to 4.25 inches. In May of that year, an improved version of the 426 was released, named the "Stage II." No motors were ever named "Stage 1." 1963-engines were available in 415 and 425 horsepower versions. 1964 was the final year of the Max Wedge option. The engine for the third year was named the "Stage III." Max Wedge cars equipped with four-speed transmissions were only produced in the final year, as prior to that point Chrysler did not have a manual transmission that could handle the power of the engine. In 1964, only 61 Dodges and 65 Plymouths were equipped with Chrysler's A-833 manual transmission.

Max Wedge cars are an essential part of automotive history as they are among the first vehicles that offered a high-performance big-block engine in an intermediate-bodied car, becoming something of a proto-muscle cars. Oldsmobile had begun the move in that direction by putting its industry-leading Rocket V8 from its luxury 98 series into the smaller 88 already in 1949, and Rambler had put its largest V8 into its intermediate sized Rebel in 1957. General Motors and Ford introduced intermediate platforms with large V8 in 1958. The 1962 413 Max Wedge Dodges and Plymouths slightly preceded the growing wave of proto-Muscle Cars that gained momentum with the 427 Ford Fairlane Thunderbolt (1964) and 427 Mercury Comet Cyclone (1964), 389 Pontiac GTO (1964), 396 Chevrolet Chevelle (1965), 400 Buick Gran Sport (1965), 400 Oldsmobile 442 (1965), and 390/427 Ford Fairlane (1966), and 390 Mercury Cyclone (1966).

Despite their historical significance and low production numbers, Max Wedge cars have not reached the same level of collectible desirability as other comparable muscle cars.

== Specifications ==
Following are the specifications for 1962 to 1964 Max Wedge engines:

| | Dodge | Plymouth |
| 1962 | "Ramcharger 413" 413 cubic inches 410 horsepower (11.0:1 compression) or 420 horsepower (13.5:1 compression) | "Super Stock 413" 413 cubic inches 410 horsepower (11.0:1 compression) or 420 horsepower (13.5:1 compression) |
| 1963 | "Ramcharger 426" and "Ramcharger 426 II" 426 cubic inches 415 horsepower (11.0:1 compression) or 425 horsepower (13.5:1 compression) | "Super Stock 426" and "Super Stock 426 II" 426 cubic inches 415 horsepower (11.0:1 compression) or 425 horsepower (13.5:1 compression) |
| 1964 | "Ramcharger 426 III" 426 cubic inches 415 horsepower (11.0:1 compression) or 425 horsepower (12.5:1 compression) | "Super Stock 426 III" 426 cubic inches 415 horsepower (11.0:1 compression) or 425 horsepower (12.5:1 compression) |

== Production numbers ==
Following are the production numbers for 1962 to 1964 Max Wedge Dodges and Plymouths:

| | Dodge | Plymouth |
| 1962 | 214 | 298 |
| 1963 | | |
| 1964 | | |
