= Mark Oswald =

Mark Oswald is a former American Funny Car driver and current Top Fuel crew chief.

Driving for Candies and Hughes, in 1984 Oswald did something no Funny Car driver had done before: he won the championship in 3 different sanctioning bodies in the same year. NHRA, IHRA, American Hot Rod Association (AHRA) The team took four IHRA titles between 1983 and 1987, including two in a row, 1986 and 1987, as well as beating John Force in the 1986 Big Bud Shootout (losing to him the next year).

After retiring as a driver, Oswald became a crew chief, currently leading the crew for Antron Brown in the Matco Tools, US Army Top Fuel dragster.
