= Front engine dragster =

Type of drag racing car

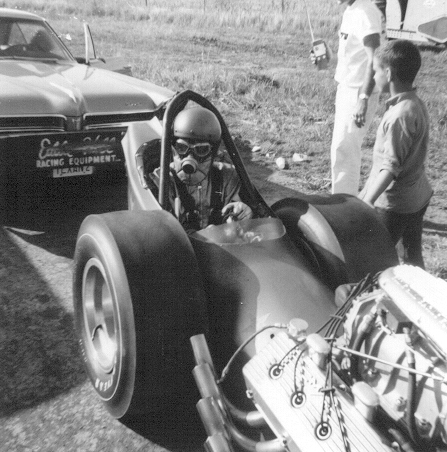
Eddie Hill's 1966 front-engine dragster

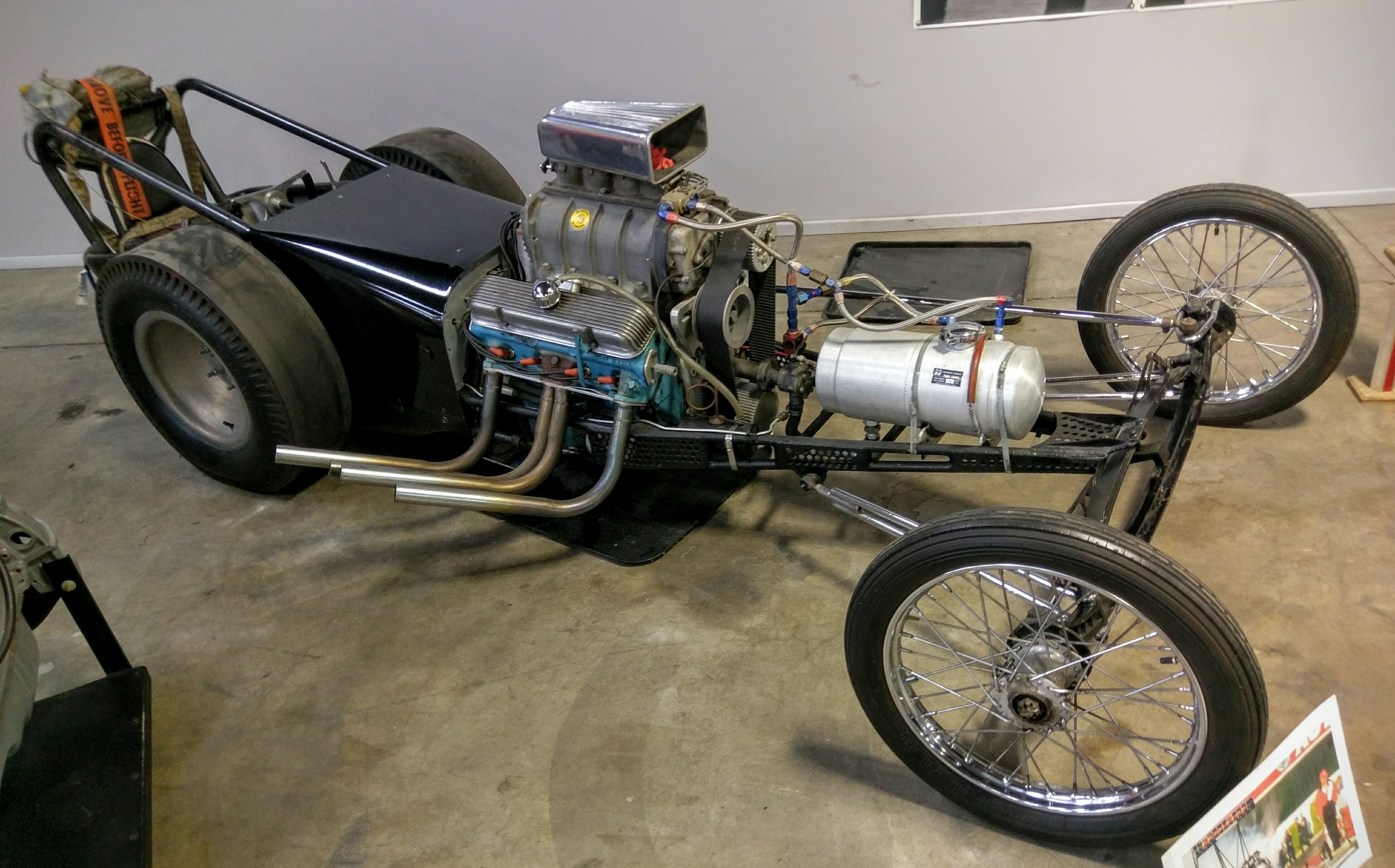
A 1958 Top Fuel rail, on display at the California Automobile Museum

The front-engine dragster is a type of racing car purposely built for drag racing. Commonly known as a "rail", "digger", or "slingshot", it is now considered obsolete, and is used only in nostalgia drag racing. Wheelbases ranged from 97 to 225 inches (2,464 to 5,715 mm).

== History ==
The front-engine dragster was an evolution from earlier front-engine hot rods and initially was a car from which all non-essential parts, including the body, had been removed to reduce weight, making the earliest dragsters essentially a production car chassis with a "souped-up" engine. These early dragsters were nicknamed "rails", due to the frame's longitudinal members (rails) being exposed to view. As the dragster design further evolved, the rear suspension was eliminated to reduce weight and enhance traction. More development resulted as builders started fabricating custom frames optimized for drag racing, with driver crash protection being integral to the frame.

With the transition from stripped-down production frames to purpose-built ones, the engine was moved rearward so more of its weight would be on the rear (driving) wheels for increased traction. Rearward positioning of the engine meant the driver had to be moved rearward as well, and in the final version of the front-engine dragster, the driver was positioned behind the rear axle at the very rear of the car. The arrangement of rearward engine mounting and the driver being behind the rear axle gave rise to the colloquial name "slingshot." Mickey Thompson is credited with introducing the slingshot design in 1954; it would become the dominant dragster design until the early 1970s.

In the quest to develop more driving traction, there were several dragsters built with four rear drive wheels, including cars by Art Chrisman (along with his brother, Lloyd, and partner Frank Cannon), Bill Coburn, and Eddie Hill. (Coburn and the Chrisman brothers used twin engines, also.). None of these four-wheel designs bore fruit; the development of tires designed specifically for drag racing made four wheels unnecessary.

In keeping with the austere nature of a dragster, the heavy cranking motor and battery needed to start the engine were two of the items removed to save weight, requiring that the dragster be push-started. This procedure was necessary until 1976, when the National Hot Rod Association (NHRA) mandated that all cars be capable of being started without pushing. As many dragsters had no reverse gear—indeed, many had no transmission at all—cars would have to be pushed back by crews after a burnout; this persisted until NHRA mandated in 1980 that all cars be capable of reversing under their own power.

The slingshot dragster's tail-heavy design, coupled with no rear suspension and steadily-increasing engine power, often resulted in high-speed control problems that led to crashes. By the late 1950s, dragster power had increased to where tire-smoking wheelspin would occur over a considerable distance, resulting in a tendency for the car to suddenly drift out of control—the tail-heavy design of the slingshot made recovery difficult. As tire technology improved, wheelstands became a problem and often had to be counteracted by attaching ballast to the front axle, sometimes hundreds of pounds' worth. Occasionally, the slingshot's propensity for doing a wheelie would result in a car completely flipping over, in what is now referred to as a "blowover." For example, this happened to Jim Nicoll at the 1970 NHRA Nationals due to a clutch failure. Some racers, such as Ronnie Scrima (on his Scrimaliner) and Tony Nancy, experimented with a small, inverted wing on the front axle, taking advantage of aerodynamic forces generated at speed to keep the front wheels firmly on the pavement.

Marginal control wasn't the only danger with the slingshot design. As the exposed engine was directly in front of the driver's compartment, he or she was vulnerable to being showered with hot oil, flying debris and burning fuel due to catastrophic engine or supercharger failure. Adding to the danger was that the driver's legs and feet were alongside the driveline. Driveline components, especially the clutch and flywheel assembly, could burst at high engine rpm, resulting in serious or fatal injuries from the violent expulsion of metal fragments.

The slingshot's numerous drawbacks led to several attempts at developing rear-engined dragsters, initially none successful. It was when Don Garlits introduced his rear-engined Swamp Rat XIV dragster in 1971 that the front-engine slingshot was finally supplanted (technically, Garlits' dragster was mid-engine; a true rear-engine layout would have the engine mounted behind the rear axle). Garlits designed the car while in the hospital recovering from a partial amputation of his foot when his slingshot's two-speed transmission burst and cut the car in two.
