= Jim Liberman =

American racing driver (1945–1977)

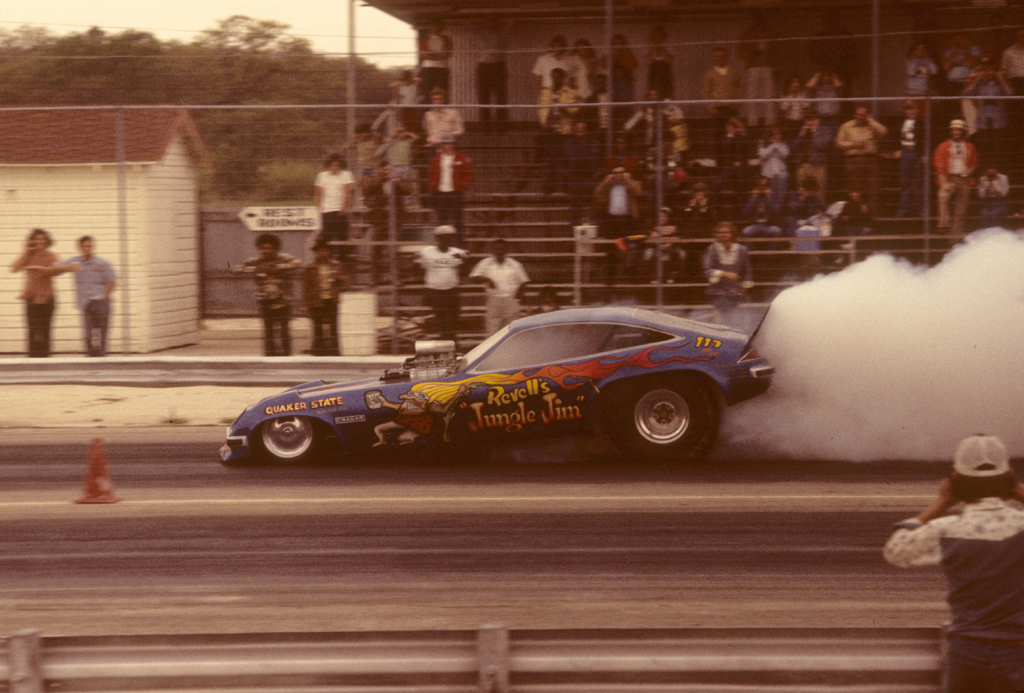
- Jungle Jim burnout in Texas, 1976
- Born: Russell James Liberman; September 12, 1945 Abington Township, Montgomery County, Pennsylvania, U.S.
- Died: September 9, 1977 (aged 31) West Goshen Township, Pennsylvania, U.S.

Previous series
- Match racing

Championship titles
- 1975 Nationals

Awards
- International Drag Racing Hall of Fame (1993)

Russell James Liberman (September 12, 1945 – September 9, 1977) was an American funny car drag racer, nicknamed "Jungle Jim." In 2001, he was named #17 on the list of the Top 50 NHRA drivers of all time. Liberman was known for driving backwards at 100 miles per hour (160 km/h) after doing his burnout.

Liberman was a flamboyant showman who primarily toured the United States at drag racing match race events. During his career, he averaged an estimated 100 events per year during the 1970s. He refused to lift off the gas when a run was completely out of shape. He was regarded by many as the "greatest showman the drag strip has ever experienced."

Liberman married Roberta Louise "Bobbi" Good on August 14, 1965, in Santa Clara, California. They divorced in October 1972 in Orange, California.

== Early life ==
Liberman was born in Pennsylvania. He dropped out of high school in his junior year and began racing when he moved to Northern California.

== Drag racing career ==
He began drag racing in the Stock division at Fremont Raceway in 1964 and made a jump up to funny cars in 1965, driving an injected Nova on nitromethane dubbed Hercules. Later that year he started on the national scene as the driver of Lew Arrington's supercharged GTO Funny Car, Brutus. In 1966, Liberman went out on his own in his first supercharged (steel-bodied) Chevy II, the first to wear the "Jungle Jim" name. In 1967, he went on a tour that established him as a household name within drag racing circles across the country. Despite making eight-second runs in his Chevy when other top dragracers in factory-sponsored cars made runs in the seven-second range, he gained a large fan following. Liberman was more interesting. He won the hearts of the spectators after he did wheelstands for the full length of the track in a two-race match race against Don Nicholson.

Liberman's success in 1967 prompted him to run a two-car team in 1968. His choice as the first driver in his second car was Clare Sanders. Others drivers using Liberman's cars included Ron Attebury, Jake Crimmins, Roy Harris, Russell Long, Pete Williams, and former partner Arrington. The team went on to include a Steve Kanuika-owned and sponsored nine-second heads-up '69 Camaro and a Dutch Irrgang-driven '72 Vega Pro Stocker.

Super Stock & Drag Illustrated had a story idea that required the total disassembly of a Funny Car down to the last nut and bolt for a true exploded-view picture. Nearly every leading driver in the category turned down the magazine's request. Liberman complied, and the resulting publicity only added to his legend. Another one of his strengths was that Liberman was the main Chevrolet banner carrier.

=== Sidekick ===
His sidekick was "Jungle Pam." Liberman met 18-year-old Pamela Hardy two weeks before she graduated from high school in May 1972 when he spotted her walking while driving his yellow Corvette. Hardy, who had been accepted to West Chester State, intended to major in business. Instead, she became Liberman's girlfriend and toured with him for four years. "I ditched the college that had accepted me, and it drove my mother nuts," she later recalled.

Liberman, eager to get fans' attention at the track, initially hired Hardy to stage his funny car on the line. Hardy was well-endowed and was always braless. She usually wore a tank top or skimpy halter and jean shorts with "zero-inch inseam". Her enticing performance gathered a lot of attention. Liberman and Hardy briefly appeared in Vrooom!, a 16-minute documentary directed by Ken Rudolph about a day at a drag race track. They also were featured in several auto magazines with Hardy typically wearing go-go boots, short-shorts, and titillating tops. She appeared on the February 1973 cover of Hot Rod magazine.

She earned the nickname "Jungle Pam" Hardy. She not only staged the car and checked under the vehicle for fluid leaks before a run, but filled the block with water and eight quarts of 70W oil, packed parachutes after each run, and helped Liberman reposition his car on the line after his burnouts. Her presence on the track was described as "a stroke of genius" and raised the profile of Liberman's team and Funny Car racing in general.

She said of Liberman, "All that showmanship was his true personality. He just didn't turn that on at the track and then became normal like everyone else at home. He had that sort of flair even when we were just at the house or went out some place. You could always feel his presence wherever he was." She described Liberman as a gifted mechanic and said that before he was killed he was considering building engines instead of racing. After Liberman's death, Hardy never worked with another driver. She later married Funny Car owner Fred Frey and after they divorced, Bill Hodgson, who tunes George Reidnauer's Excalibur Corvette Nostalgia Funny Car.

=== NHRA ===
Liberman distrusted the NHRA and preferred the barn storming nature of match racing with its guaranteed payouts for three runs, win or lose, over racing on the NHRA circuit. He had one national event win in NHRA competition at the 1975 Summernationals at Englishtown, New Jersey. His second car was driven by Clare Sanders to victory at the 1969 Winternationals.

During 1972 and 1973, Liberman attended 100 race meets; this record was matched only by "TV Tommy" Ivo and Ed "The Ace" McCulloch.

Liberman drove a Vega funny car, in three distinct incarnations. The first Vega, painted candy blue, appeared in August 1972, was on the cover of Hot Rod. Designed by Romeo Palamides, it was bodied by Ron Pelligrini's company, Fiberglass Ltd. The second Vega was driven primarily by Roy Harris, and was painted a darker candy blue than the first. It was the subject of a Revell model kit. The third made its debut in 1974.

== Death ==
Liberman was driving his Chevrolet Corvette car in West Goshen Township near West Chester, Pennsylvania when he rounded a corner on the West Chester Pike at excessive speed and collided with a SEPTA transit bus head-on September 9, 1977, killing him. The car was wedged under the bumper and underchassis of the bus. It took responders more than 45 minutes to extricate his body from the wreckage.
