= Bruce Allen (drag racer) =

American retired drag racer

Bruce Allen (born in 1950) is an American retired drag racer.

== Career ==
=== Early life and career ===
Allen was born around in 1950, and comes from Goodrich, Michigan. He graduated from high school in Goodrich in 1968. Allen grew up in an area where oval tracks were dominant. Early on, he showed no interest in them, but did gain an interest in muscle cars. Allen first became involved in drag racing in 1964 when he attended a drag racing event in Ubly, Michigan. Allen's first car for drag racing was a 1966 Oldsmobile 442 whose engine kept breaking, with Allen later switching to a Chevrolet L-88 engine.

In 1970, Allen owned and operated a gasoline station and the same year saw him team up with Jim Hanley, a member of the Gratiot Auto Supply team, to run a 1964 Chevrolet Corvette in the D/MP and E/MP racing categories. The team later switched to the Gas and Altered classes with the team eventually racing with. He began working for McLaren Engines based in Livonia, Michigan to the west of Detroit in the mid-1970s before resigning his job teaching repairs to small engines and giving auto-shop classes and constructing engines for the McLaren IndyCar team in August 1985. Allen later accepted the offer to drive the Dave Reher/Buddy Chevrolet Camaro in the Pro Stock Division after its regular driver Lee Shepherd was killed in an accident in Oklahoma.

On October 7, 2005, during a qualifying event at the Texas Motorplex, Allen was competing against Kenny Koretsky in a qualifying pass when his car, a Pontiac Grand Am lost control half-way on the strip and swerved onto its side causing a collision with Koretsky's Dodge Stratus. The resulting collision caused Allen's car to make heavy contact and split his car, causing an explosion which destroyed Allen's car with the 500-cubic-inch engine rolling down the strip. The crash caused him to retire from the sport.

== Approach ==
In an interview with Drag Racing Online in 2000, Allen stated that his approach to drag racing was similar to that of an owner of a baseball team. He played racquet ball and did bicycle riding to maintain his fitness.
