= Gene Snow =

American racing driver

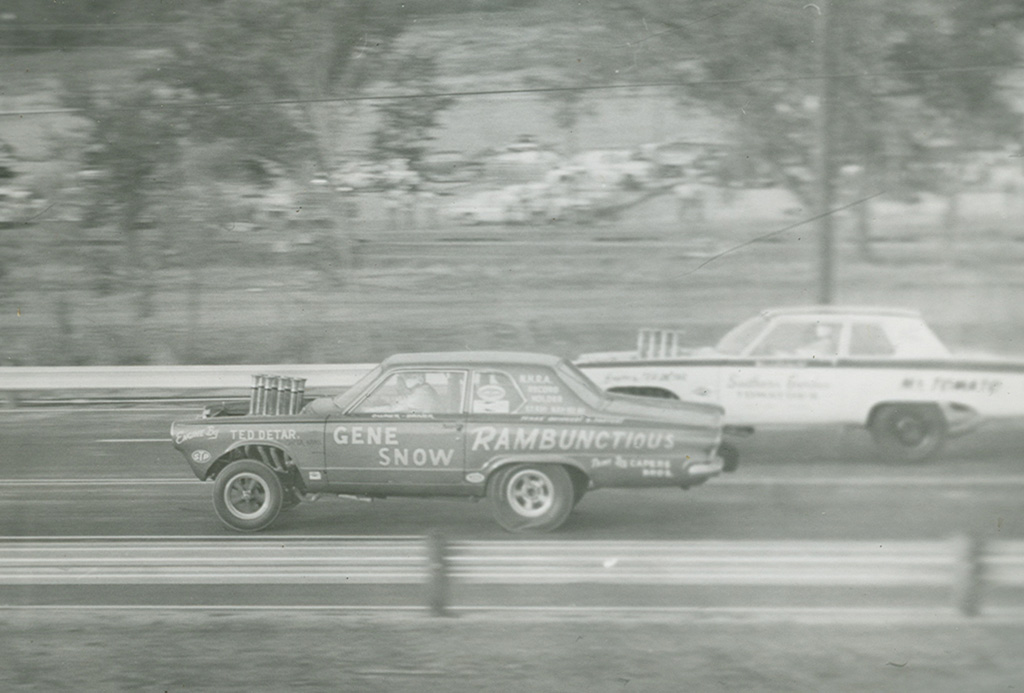
Rambunctious, #26

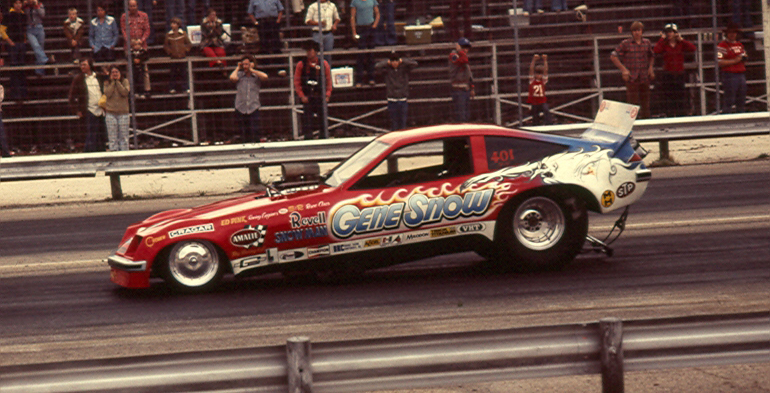
1975 Funny Car

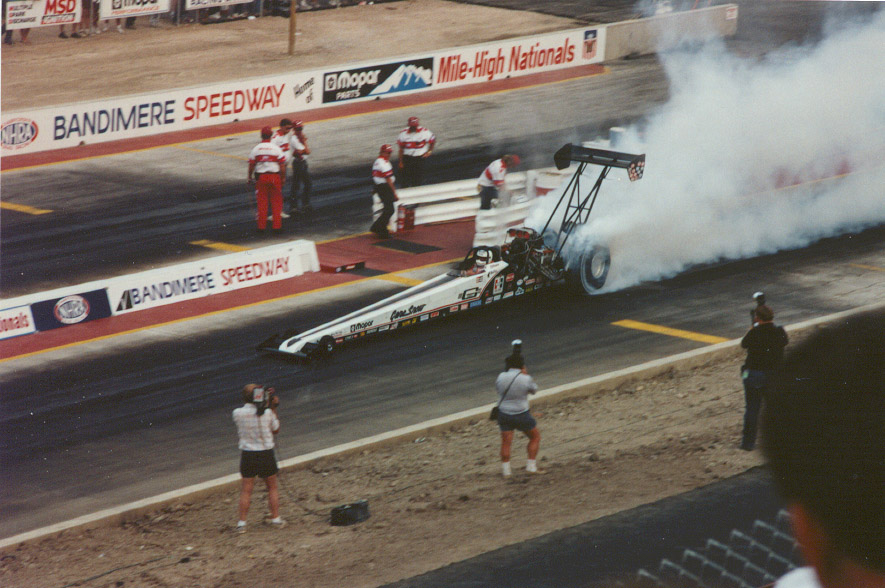
Top Fuel, c. 1990

Gene Snow was an American racing driver who pioneered funny cars in the 1960s, '70s, and '80s, bringing innovations such as a direct drive system using multiple clutches when rivals were still using automatic transmissions based on those used in production models. He was ranked #26 on NHRA's Top 50 drivers in 2001.

== Drag racing career ==
Originally an engineering student at the University of Texas at Arlington, he opened a used car dealership and drag raced cars from the dealership to promote his business. After each win, he sold the car the next day, which gained him more attention. This led to him taking racing more seriously, driving a 1958 Chevy Impala with a 409 Cubic Inch Chevrolet "W-Block" engine made famous by the Beach Boys in their song, "409". He moved over to Chrysler Corporation cars by 1963, driving a Plymouth Sport Fury.

As the 1960s progressed, Snow developed innovations such as stretching the wheelbase to improve handling, which lead to several class wins in 1966–'67. Stretching the chassis was his seminal contribution to the new Fuel Coupe, aka Funny Car class, which evolved out of the Altered wheelbase Factory Experimental (aka "FX") and super stock classes. Although funny car was not a class recognized by the National Hot Rod Association, Snow was allowed to run in the dragster classes, where he ran a 9.04-second quarter-mile E.T. He repeated he success in 1967, running an 8.67-second quarter-mile E.T. in the new Super Eliminator class. By 1968, he went to the gasoline-burning classes and won B/Altered (a class for modified production vehicles).

At this time, Snow realized that the increased torque that was coming from engines like the new generation Chrysler Hemi engine would destroy a transmission, whereas direct drive would be more suited to the conditions under full load. He explained it this way: "We worked with Crower to come up with a four-disc Crowerglide centrifugal clutch. Though it was sluggish off the line, it would mow down the automatic cars, which always nosed-over at about 185 mph."

The idea being that as engine RPM increased, the clutches would engage and there would be no gearsets to destroy. With the simplified drivetrain, he was the first funny car driver over the 200 mph barrier in the autumn of 1969, at Dickson, Texas, later running 205.046 mph at Orange County International Raceway. Snow said, astonished: "The sea level location gave us extra horsepower, and we went 200.88 mph on the first pass. I didn't think it such a big deal at the time, but we kept running more than 200 mph at just about every race after that."

By the late 1970s, Snow took a sabbatical due to costs as a result of the 1970s oil crisis and the political situation in the Middle East that precipitated it, along with sub-par seasons, returning in 1981 to race in the Top Fuel class. During this time, he worked on developing his direct drive for Top Fuel cars.

Notable achievements in the 1980s include the first 4-second E.T. run in an NHRA sanctioned event at Royal Purple Raceway. Snow raced in Top Fuel into the 1992 season, when he was sidelined by an accident and retired.

== Legal history ==
Snow's racing achievements have been overshadowed by allegations that he molested a male fan he met at a dragstrip in 1987.

Snow was arrested for public lewdness in 1978 and 1984. In 1999, Snow was charged with several counts of obscenity and employment harmful to a child.

In 2007 in Tarrant County, Texas, he was charged with aggravated sexual assault of a child under the age of 14. A teenage boy accused Snow of molesting him at Snow's home from 2000 through July 2006. The charges were reduced to injury to a child under 15 and Snow took a plea deal, ending up with probation and a $300 fine.
