= Funny Car =

Type of drag racing vehicle

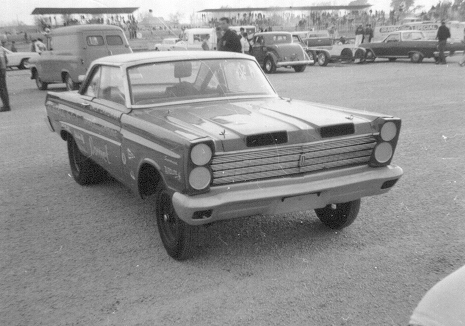
Early Jack Chrisman Funny Car from 1965

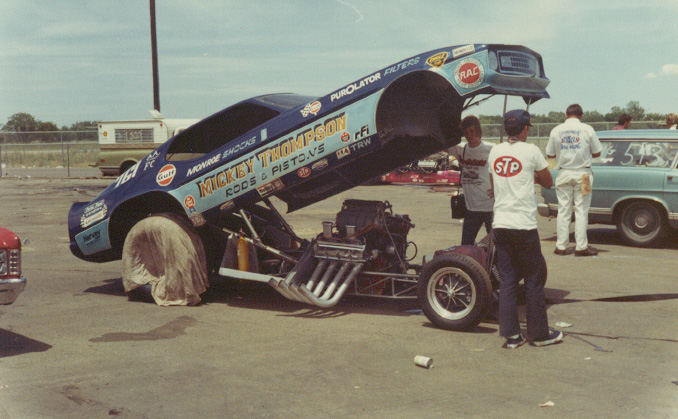
1971 Mickey Thompson-owned Funny Car

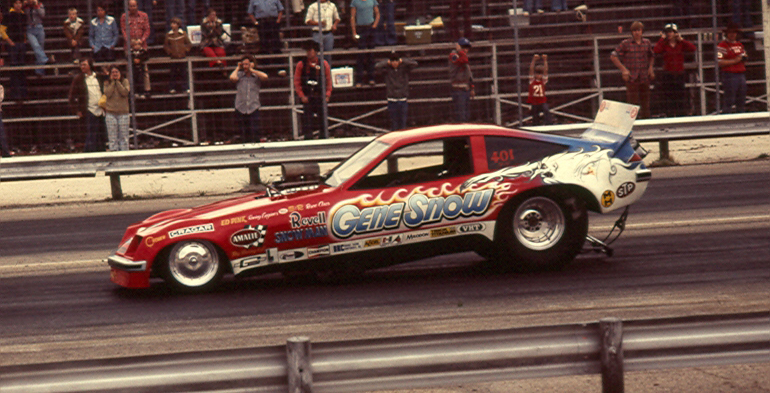
1975 Gene Snow Funny Car

A Funny Car is a type of drag racing vehicle and a specific racing class in organized drag racing. Funny Cars are characterized by having tilt-up fiberglass or carbon fiber automotive bodies over a custom-fabricated chassis, giving them an appearance vaguely approximating manufacturers' showroom models. They also have the engine placed in front of the driver, as opposed to dragsters, which place it behind the driver.

Funny Car bodies typically reflect the models of newly available cars in the time period that the Funny Car was built. For example, in the 1970s, then current models such as the Chevrolet Vega or Plymouth Barracuda were often represented as Funny Cars, and the bodies represented the Big Three of General Motors, Ford, and Chrysler. Currently, four manufacturers are represented in National Hot Rod Association (NHRA) Funny Car: Chevrolet with the Camaro, Dodge with the Charger, Ford with the Mustang, and Toyota with the Supra. Worldwide, however, many different body styles are used. These "fake" body shells are not just cosmetic: they serve an important aerodynamic purpose. Modern Funny Cars can rival or surpass Top Fuel dragsters. In 2016, fielding a Funny Car team could cost between US$2.6 and US$3 million. A single carbon fiber body can cost US$70,000.

== Guidelines ==
The NHRA has strict guidelines for Funny Cars. Most of the rules relate to the engine. In short, the engines can only be V8s displacing no more than 500 cu in (8.2 L). The most popular design is a Donovan, loosely based on the second generation Chrysler 426 Hemi.

Crankshafts are CNC machine carved from steel billet, then nitrided in an oven to increase surface hardness. Intake valves are titanium and of 2.40 in (61 mm) diameter, while exhaust valves are 1.90 in (48 mm) diameter, made from Inconel. Every Funny Car has ballistic blankets covering the supercharger because this part of the engine is prone to explosion.

Funny Car fuel systems are key to their immense power. During a single run (starting, burnout, backing up, staging, 1/4 mile) cars can burn as much as 15 US gallons (12 imp gal; 57 L) of fuel. The fuel mixture is usually 85–90% nitromethane (nitro, "fuel") and 10–15% methanol (alcohol, "alky"). The ratio of fuel to air can be as high as 1:1. Compression ratios vary from 6:1 to 7:1. The engines in Funny Cars commonly exhibit varying piston heights and ratios that are determined by the piston's proximity to the air intake. Funny Cars have a fixed gear ratio of 3.20:1 and have a reversing gear; power is transmitted from engine to final drive through a multiple staged clutch which provides progressive incremental lockup as the run proceeds. The rate/degree of lockup is mechanically/pneumatically controlled and preset before each run according to various conditions, in particular, the track surface. Wheelbases are between 100 and 125 in (2,500 and 3,200 mm). The car must maintain a 3 in (76 mm) ground clearance.

Horsepower claims vary widely –from 10,000 to 11,000 HP (7.5–8 MW). Supercharged, nitromethane-fueled motors of this type have a very high torque, estimated at 7,000 ft⋅lbf (9,500 N⋅m). They routinely achieve a 6-G acceleration from a standing start.

== Safety ==
Many safety rules are in place to protect the driver and fans. The more visible safety devices are the twin parachutes to help stabilize and decelerate the car after crossing the finish line. Less visible precautions include roll cages and fire extinguishers.

During safety evaluations in the wake of the fatal crash of Scott Kalitta on June 21, 2008, in Englishtown, N.J., the NHRA reduced the distance of Top Fuel and Funny Car races to 1,000 feet (304 meters) effective July 2, 2008, as later did the National Drag Racing Championship in Australia. Pro Stock and sportsman classes still race to 1/4 mile (1,320 feet, 402 meters).

== History ==
=== Origins ===
In drag racing in the mid-1960s, Top Fuel horsepower began to be combined with bodied cars with altered wheelbases to produce the first Funny Cars. The term "funny car" is attributed to Mercury's chief of racing, Fran Hernandez, as in "We need to beat those 'funny' cars." The first Funny Cars were built in the early to mid-1960s. Funny Car as a class traces its roots to Super Stock, through "the intriguingly named Optional Super Stock class", to A/Factory Experimental (A/FX), which NHRA introduced in 1962, and ultimately XS (experimental stock). At the start, the rear tires ("slicks") were made with a bias-ply construction ("wrinklewall" slicks had not been invented yet), which meant that grip upon launching was poor. Racers who performed these altered wheelbase modifications found it shifted the center of gravity rearward, which placed more weight on the rear wheels, enhancing traction from these bias-ply slicks. Because of these many obvious modifications they did not look stock, hence the name "funny". The wheelbases were changed to assist traction for the narrow (7 in (180 mm)-wide) slicks (required by NHRA rules), while keeping the mandatory factory distance between axle centers.

=== First Funny Cars (1964–1965) ===
The first of the "funny-looking cars" were a trio of 1964 Dodge 330 Max Wedges which were named the "Dodge Chargers". They debuted in March 1964 at San Diego Raceway. Funny Cars started as stockers, and were, at first, pure exhibition cars, in the Super/Factory Experimental (S/FX) class; NHRA treated them like a passing fad, and tried to "legislate them out of existence" by placing them in first gas and then fuel dragster classes, with cars of half the weight and twice the horsepower. Funny Car success followed the popularity of gassers, the previous favorite doorslammer class. The precursor of the Funny Car, appearing almost a decade earlier, was John Bandimere's blown '55 Chevy. Funny Cars were also preceded by the Modified Sport cars, which had fiberglass bodies, tube frames, and supercharged set-back engines even before Super Stock was conceived. Among the Modified Sport racers to challenge early Funny Cars were Roger Hardcastle and Les Beattie with Stinger, sporting a blown, fuel injected Chrysler hemi in an Astra J-5, which in 1964 proved capable of 10.02 second E.T.s at 143.85 mph (231.50 km/h)

The first Funny Cars were Super Stock 1964 Dodge 330 Max Wedges, named the "Dodge Chargers", prepared, at the behest of Don Beebe, by Dragmaster's Jim Nelson and Dode Martin. Raced in the Supercharged Experimental Stock (S/XS) class, their original 426 Max Wedges were replaced by stroked 480 cu in (8 L) Top Gas engines (virtual clones of the Top Gas Dodge Dart engines also built by Dragmaster). (Thus, they were technically "funny gassers", not fuel cars, unlike the later examples.) Despite their fuel limitations, however, they were turning in E.T.s in the high 10s, with speeds around 130 mph (210 km/h), when Super Stock and FX cars were only running 11s at about 120 mph (190 km/h), clearly a winning edge. They would also be the first factory cars fitted with parachutes, and the first to see the drivers wear firesuits.

The first major altered-wheelbase car was Dick Landy's class-legal SS/A 1964 Dodge 330, which had front and rear axles moved radically forward, a high gasser-style front end and axle, and a 426 hemi. Converted by Landy to A/FX in September 1964, using a straight front axle (from a Dodge A100 van) to reduce weight, then moving the front wheels 6" forward and the 8¾" rear axle 8" forward by relocating the spring hangers. Aluminum parts (including hood, front fenders, radiator shroud, front bumper and supports) replaced steel. Considered to be the first 'Funny Car' (it just looked funny at the time). First appearing at the AHRA Winternationals at Phoenix, Arizona, 29–31 January 1964, the combination improved E.T.s from low 11s with speeds in the 120 mph (190 km/h) range to 10.60s at almost 130 mph (210 km/h). For 1965, Plymouth Belvederes and Dodge Coronets were treated to the altered wheelbase configuration for their factory drivers. Only twelve were built.

The three Chargers, wearing a color scheme of red body sides and white roof, hood, and trunk, with two blue longitudinal stripes, were driven by Jimmy Nix, who previously ran a Top Gas dragster; Jim Johnson, who ran a Dodge Polara stocker, and who had won the B/SA title in 1963; Jim Nelson; and Dode Martin. (Nix tried to persuade Chrisman to get Mercury Racing Director Fran Hernandez to allow him to run his Comet's 427 on nitro, as a way to gain leverage on NHRA, so Nix could use nitro himself). Their debut was at San Diego Raceway in March 1964, for a three-race exhibition. While in theory all were identical, Nix would change slicks or add lead shot in the trunk of his Dodge 330 to improve traction. For their part, the Dodge factory spent only US$250,000 on the inaugural season, insufficient for a single car, let alone three, an amount arranged by promoter Don Beebe, who persuaded Wally Parks safety would not be compromised, promising the cars would be built to Super Stock standard.

Three months after the Chargers' debut, the factory-backed Sachs and Sons 1964 Mercury Comet, powered by a supercharged 427 wedge engine, made its debut, at the 1964 Nationals in Indianapolis. Driven by Jack Chrisman, and entered in B/FD, the Comet created a sensation. When Chrisman's Comet first ran in Indy, the Charger program had been waylaid by financial issues and parts shortages. Their final race appearance was at a Greer, South Carolina, dragstrip, in July 1964. Nix, disappointed, went back to TG/D. Chrisman's Comet was placed in the B/Fuel Dragster class at Indianapolis; he was defeated in eliminations, but not before recording a pass of 10.25 seconds at 156.31 mph (251.56 km/h) mph.

The success of these cars inspired other racers to give up class racing for supercharged exhibition cars, led by "Arnie Farmer" Beswick and his Pontiac GTO, Gary Dyer's hemi Dodge A/FX (financed by Norm Krause, "Mister Norm"). Funny Cars proved enormously popular, with cars driven by Chrisman and Beswick setting track records all over the U.S. The first wave of Funny Car development ended around 1965, when bracket racer Jim Liberman and crew chief Lew Arrington made a deal with Pontiac to supply rare hemis (remnants of Mickey Thompson's gas dragster program). (The duo later switched to Chrysler powerplants.) Two of the Dodge trio would return in 1965 as the Guzler Chargers team, powered by supercharged, nitro-fuelled hemis, with direct drive; both crashed the same year. The popularity of Funny Car grew that year, with January's AHRA Winternationals seeing seven entrants: the Ramchargers, "Dandy Dick" Landy, and Bud Faubel, in Dodges; and Butch Leal, Sox & Martin, the Golden Commandos, and Lee Smith in Plymouths. By June, the number was over a dozen, including factory Mustangs and Cyclones with 427 "cammers". A dedicated Funny Car class was tried by NHRA at one 1966 national event, and at two in 1968, before Funny Car Eliminator was created in 1969.

Funny Car in this period also saw twin-engined examples, like those in Top Fuel Dragster, among them the unusual slingshot-chassised Mustang-bodied Phony Pony, built by Alroy "Junior" Brogdon.

=== The flopper era (1966–1969) ===
The trend to flip-top fiberglass bodies ("floppers") began with Jim Lytle's US$2000 Allison V-1710-powered chopped '34 Tudor Big Al II. It would inspire "every flopper body ever formed." Chrysler's dominance led Hernandez and Al Turner to try and turn things in Mercury's favor; Don Nicholson's flip-top, tube-chassis Comet, arriving in 1966, changed everything. The "flopper" bodied Comets were highly successful in the hands of Chrisman, Kenz and Leslie, and Eddie Schartman; at the 1966 World Final, Schartman would become NHRA's first official Funny Car title winner. Tom McEwen, better known for his dragster racing, flirted with Funny Cars in 1965, as did Lou Barney, a veteran slingshot racer; Barney's hemi-powered, mid-engined Barracuda proved unsafe before being replaced by another, which turned out to be "one of the quickest early match racers". So did Gary Gabelich, probably better known for land speed racing, in the Beach City Chevrolet-sponsored Sting Ray. Before TF/FC became an official class, Funny Cars were run as B/FDs and C/FDs (B and C/Fuel Dragster), an odd classification, since they were bodied cars, not dragsters. In 1965, Ford produced Holman and Moody-built fiberglass-bodied Mustangs for (among others) Gas Ronda, who was the most successful Ford racer.

In 1966, Mercury offered a revolutionary flopper-bodied Comet, as exemplified by Don Nicholson's Eliminator I, which clocked a 7.98 at Detroit Dragway in its debut season, the quickest of the fuel injected cars. The car was built by Logghe Bros. (based in Detroit) (with bodies by Fiberglass Trends), weighing in around 1,700 lb (770 kg), making it heavier than most contemporary top fuel dragsters. (It would be the first Funny Car on the cover of Hot Rod, in April 1966.) Similar cars went to Chrisman, "Fast Eddie" Schartman, and Kenz and Leslie. These cars had the first coilover suspension in Funny Car, and were powered by Hilborn-injected 427 SOHCs producing 1,000 hp (750 kW) on 80% nitro. (Chrisman's was the oddity, a roadster running a 6-71 GMC supercharger.) They were capable of mid-seven second e.t.s at around 185 mph (298 km/h). Schartman (working with Roy Steffey, on the "Flip-Top Fueler") would beat Chrisman for Top Funny Car at the NHRA World Finals in 1966 at Tulsa, Oklahoma, with a pass of 8.28 at 174.41 mph (280.69 km/h). Nicholson would fit a Pete Robinson-built Top Fuel 427 SOHC late in the 1967 season and turn 7.90s at around 180 mph (290 km/h), earning an eighty-six percent winning record. (The success of the Top Fuel-engined Comets would eventually prompt both Ford and Chrysler to drop Funny Car sponsorship.) In 1967, Doug Thorley would record the first (unofficial) 200 mph (320 km/h) Funny Car pass in his Corvair at Lions. Even in 1965, Ford factory support wavered since the manufacturer did not build street versions of the radically altered cars; by 1968, pioneering Chrysler was also considering withdrawal.

Of the privateers in this era, Bruce Larson's USA-1 (a '66 Chevelle with a Hilborn-injected 427 and four-speed) was the most successful. Among other early Funny Car competitors were Hayden Proffitt, who faced Chrisman at Lions Dragway in 1966 and won in a Hicks and Sublet-chassised Corvair. Butch Leal would body one of Logghe's first customer chassis with a fiberglass Plymouth Barracuda and run an injected 426 Hemi on 100% nitro; this car's best pass would be a 7.82 at 182.16 mph (293.16 km/h), with a career win ratio of ninety percent. In 1967, Proffitt would take over the failed Grant Rebel SST AMC Rambler, aided by Les Shockley, "Famous" Amos Satterlee, and Dwight Guild. Gene Conway built the hemi Jeep Destroyer (sponsored by the U.S. Navy), and scored so much success, NHRA banned Jeep Funny Cars in 1967.

Logghe proved unable to keep up with the demand for their chassis, leading to the creation of a Funny Car chassis-building industry, which was soon joined by Dick Fletcher, Don Hardy, Ronnie Scrima, and a number of others. Late in 1969, Pat Foster and John Buttera would devise a Top Fuel dragster-style chassis to replace the "dune buggy" design common at the time. This would go under the Mustang Mach Is of Danny Ongais and Mickey Thompson. Similar chassis would be built by Logghe, Scrima, Buttera, Woody Gilmore, Don Long, and Steve Plueger, among others; this design remains the standard in TF/FC. In 1968, Thorley would drive a rear-engined Javelin, built by Woody Gilmore, powered by an AMC 401. (This engine would later be replaced by a 392 Hemi prepared by John Hoven and Glenn Okazaki.) That same year, Leal would sell his 'cuda to Don Schumacher. NHRA created the new Funny Car (TF/FC) class at the NHRA Winternationals in 1969; Funny Car Eliminator (FCE) would be won by Clare Sanders, teammate of "Jungle Jim" Liberman. Tragedy struck the same year, with the death of Jerry Schwartz in the ex-Foster Mach I. In a virtually identical car (except the color), Ongais won a number of rounds, with passes frequently in the low sevens at over 182.16 mph (293.16 km/h), including taking Funny Car Eliminator at the USnats.

=== Records and championships (1969–1979) ===
Gene Snow would record the first official 200 mph (320 km/h) pass in the Keith Black-engined, Logghe-chassised 1969 Dodge Charger, Rambunctious. One of the most famous (and popular) Funny Cars in NHRA history would appear in 1969: Chi-Town Hustler, a Charger prepared by Fakonas and Coil (driven by Pat Minnick). Another Funny Car record was set in 1970 by Leroy Goldstein ("The Israeli Rocket"), then testing Firestone tires, with a 6.99 pass at Capitol Raceway, Funny Car's first under seven seconds. By November, Jake Johnson in the hemi-powered Blue Max (driving for Harry Schmidt) turned in a 6.72 at 218 mph (351 km/h), at OCIR. The big news that year was the creation of Mattel Hot Wheels-sponsored team of Don Prudhomme and Tom McEwen.

Don Garlits' 1971 accident in Top Fuel Dragster, which led to the creation of the revolutionary Swamp Rat XIV, did not produce the same kind of change in Funny Car, though there had been a number of rear-engined examples, including Thorley's Javelin and Dave Bowman's California Stud, which was the most successful of the rear-engined Funny Cars. The Funny Car Eliminator title at the 1971 Winternats would go to Roland Leong's Charger, Hawaiian. At the 1972 Supernationals, Jim Dunn recorded a historic win in his Barracuda, the first and only, won by a mid-engined Funny Car. In 1973, Shirley Muldowney teamed up with Connie Kalitta as the Bounty Hunter and Bounty Huntress in a pair of Ford Mustangs, hers a Buttera chassis, his a Logghe. Between 1973 and 1975, Ed "The Ace" McCulloch would score eighteen wins at NHRA national events in the Revell-sponsored Dodge Dart, Revellution. Shirl Greer would defeat Prudhomme in the final in 1974 to take the first NHRA Funny Car World Championship. He would suffer severe burns in the final after an engine exploded. In 1975, Raymond Beadle and Harry Schmidt resurrected the Blue Max; built by Tony Casarez Race Cars, the Mustang II would win at Indianapolis. Beadle later bought out Schmidt and went on to seven Funny Car national titles, four with NHRA, three with IHRA.

=== Corporate era and Force dominance (1980s–2000s) ===
Mark Oswald, driving for Candies and Hughes (with Old Milwaukee sponsorship), in 1984 did something no other driver has: he won both the NHRA and IHRA world championships. The team took four IHRA titles between 1983 and 1987, including two in a row, 1986 and 1987, as well as beating John Force in the 1986 Big Bud Shootout (losing to him the next year). Force between 1987 and 1996, won sixty-seven of 203 NHRA national events, four of nine Big Bud Shootouts, and six World Championships. In 1996, with Austin Coil tuning, Force went to the final round in sixteen of nineteen national events, taking thirteen wins, one of the best records ever in Funny Car history. Force's domination in 1989 would only really be challenged by Bruce Larson, a long-time East Coast match racer, with Outlaw sprint car driver Maynard Yingst as his tuner, winning six events and taking the runner-up spot five times, in an Oldsmobile sponsored by Sentry. In 1992, the honor of putting Force on the trailer would go to Cruz Pedregon, driving the Larry Minor McDonald's-sponsored Olds to the championship. Pedregon was also one of the first Funny Car drivers to clock a five-second e.t. Ed McCulloch in 1988 would claim the US$100,000 prize for winning both IHRA TF/FC events at Texas Motorplex; Eddie Hill would do the same in TFD that year. (Billy Meyer, who owned IHRA and offered the prize, would sell at season's end.) Kenny Bernstein and tuner Dale Armstrong would turn to land speed racers the Arivett brothers to design Bernstein's car in 1989. This car would be dubbed the "Batmobile". It would profoundly change Funny Car aerodynamics. In 1991, Jim White, driving for Leong, turned in two of the fastest Funny Car passes to date, at over 290 mph (470 km/h), and placed second to Force in the championship. Al and Helen Hoffman, with tuner Tom Anderson, "were the antithesis of the corporate button-down shirt racers." Sponsored by Blower Drive Service and later Sears, Roebuck, & Co., during the 1990s, Hoffman earned eleven national event wins, as well as the 1991 Winston Invitational and the U. S. Nationals non-championship money race in 1991, 1994, and 1995. Tom McEwen would build his "gorgeous" replica '57 Funny Car, running it as an NHRA exhibition vehicle and creating Nostalgia Funny Car, even though the car would not (now) be legal in that class. Major corporate sponsorship money came to Funny Car starting in 1997, leading to significant changes in the sport. Multi-car teams, with several tuners each, became commonplace, and single car teams "had a very slim chance of winning an NHRA World Championship". Force's domination would continue, with ten NHRA FC World Championship wins from 1993 to 2002, including six straight 1997–2002; his success was so amazing he was accused of cheating (and was willing to strip off his firesuit to prove he was not). Between 1997 and 2006, Force went to the final in 105 of 228 events and took sixty-one tour wins, as well as qualifying for all ten Big Bud Shootouts, winning in 2000 and 2006. On top of that, he had ten of the quickest or fastest passes in Funny Car.

=== Modern era ===
In recent years, a resurgence of interest in vintage drag cars has created many new "nostalgia" Funny Cars, which are newly made vintage-style Funny Car bodies mounted on modern Funny Car frames or, in certain cases, newly built frames that look close to the originals and are made NHRA legal. These "Nostalgia Funny Cars" often compete in various nostalgia drag racing events, such as the NHRA Heritage Hot Rod Racing Series, which includes the National Hot Rod Reunion and the California Hot Rod Reunion. In 2007, NHRA limited technical innovation in Funny Car, as well as introducing a 1,000 ft (300 m) track length and restrictions on maximum engine revs. The dominance of John Force Racing ended in 2006 and between 2007 and 2015 was equalled by DSR, with three TF/FC titles each. Funny Car is dominated by multi-car teams, with only Cruz Pedregon, Jim Dunn, and Tim Wilkerson maintaining the traditional one-car operation.

== List of Funny Cars ==
| Manufacturer | Chassis | Image |
|---|---|---|
| (United States) Chevrolet | Camaro | |
| (United States) Chevrolet | Camaro | |
| (United States) Chevrolet | Impala | |
| (United States) Chevrolet | Monte Carlo | |
| (United States) Dodge | Charger | |
| (United States) Dodge | Stratus | |
| (United States) Ford | Mustang II | |
| (United States) Ford | Mustang III | |
| (United States) Ford | Mustang IV | |
| (United States) Ford | Mustang V | |
| (United States) Pontiac | Firebird | |
| (Japan) Toyota | GR Supra | |
| (Japan) Toyota | Solara | |

== NHRA Nitro Funny Car champions ==
- 1969 – Clare Sanders (Funny Car Eliminator)
- 1974 – Shirl Greer
- 1975 – Don Prudhomme
- 1976 – Don Prudhomme
- 1977 – Don Prudhomme
- 1978 – Don Prudhomme
- 1979 – Raymond Beadle
- 1980 – Raymond Beadle
- 1981 – Raymond Beadle
- 1982 – Frank Hawley
- 1983 – Frank Hawley
- 1984 – Mark Oswald
- 1985 – Kenny Bernstein
- 1986 – Kenny Bernstein
- 1987 – Kenny Bernstein
- 1988 – Kenny Bernstein
- 1989 – Bruce Larson
- 1990 – John Force
- 1991 – John Force
- 1992 – Cruz Pedregon
- 1993 – John Force
- 1994 – John Force
- 1995 – John Force
- 1996 – John Force
- 1997 – John Force
- 1998 – John Force
- 1999 – John Force
- 2000 – John Force
- 2001 – John Force
- 2002 – John Force
- 2003 – Tony Pedregon
- 2004 – John Force
- 2005 – Gary Scelzi
- 2006 – John Force
- 2007 – Tony Pedregon
- 2008 – Cruz Pedregon
- 2009 – Robert Hight
- 2010 – John Force
- 2011 – Matt Hagan
- 2012 – Jack Beckman
- 2013 – John Force
- 2014 – Matt Hagan
- 2015 – Del Worsham
- 2016 – Ron Capps
- 2017 – Robert Hight
- 2018 – JR Todd
- 2019 – Robert Hight
- 2020 – Matt Hagan
- 2021 – Ron Capps
- 2022 – Ron Capps
- 2023 – Matt Hagan
- 2024 – Austin Prock
- 2025 – Austin Prock

Currently, John Force is the driver in the Funny Car class with the most wins, having 16 championships, more than 1,000 round wins and also 157 career wins. He is also the owner with the most Funny Car championships with 21, since Tony Pedregon (2003), Robert Hight (2009, 2017 and 2019), and Austin Prock (2024) have won five titles while on his team. Force's former crew chief, Austin Coil, also has logged the highest number of wins in that position.

== Most NHRA Funny Car wins ==
Key
| ** | Denotes active driver |

| Driver | Wins |
|---|---|
| John Force | 157 |
| Ron Capps** | 79 |
| Robert Hight | 65 |
| Matt Hagan** | 59 |
| Tony Pedregon | 43 |
| Cruz Pedregon** | 40 |
| Jack Beckman** | 39 |
| Don Prudhomme | 35 |
| Del Worsham | 31 |
| Kenny Bernstein | 30 |
| Tim Wilkerson | 24 |
| Austin Prock** | 23 |
| Tommy Johnson Jr | 21 |
| Whit Bazemore | 20 |
| Mark Oswald | 18 |
| Ed McCulloch | 18 |
| Bob Tasca III | 18 |
| J.R. Todd** | 16 |
| Al Hofmann | 15 |
| Chuck Etchells | 13 |
| Raymond Beadle | 13 |
| Gary Scelzi | 12 |
| Courtney Force | 12 |
| Billy Meyer | 11 |
| Mike Neff | 10 |
| Mike Dunn | 10 |
| Gordie Bonin | 9 |
| Gary Densham | 8 |
| Johnny Gray | 7 |
| Frank Hawley | 7 |
| Bruce Larson | 7 |
| Alexis DeJoria** | 6 |
| Eric Medlen | 6 |
| Dale Pulde | 6 |
| Jerry Toliver | 5 |
| Tom Hoover | 5 |
| Al Segrini | 5 |
| Tom McEwen | 4 |
| Jim White | 4 |
| Ashley Force Hood | 4 |
| Jeff Arend | 4 |
| Phil Burkart Jr | 4 |
| Frank Pedregon Jr | 4 |
| Jim Epler | 4 |
| Jordan Vandergriff** | 4 |
| Chad Green** | 3 |
| Jim Head | 3 |
| Mike Ashley | 3 |
| Shawn Langdon** | 2 |
| Blake Alexander** | 2 |
| K.C. Spurlock | 2 |
| Dean Skuza | 2 |
| Randy Anderson | 2 |
| Bruce Sarver | 2 |
| Tripp Shumake | 2 |
| Tim Grose | 2 |
| John Lombardo | 2 |
| Leonard Hughes | 2 |
| Don Schumacher | 2 |
| Leroy Goldstein | 2 |
| Dale Emery | 2 |
| Paul Lee** | 1 |
| Melanie Troxel | 1 |
| Bob Gilbertson | 1 |
| Gary Clapshaw | 1 |
| Tony Bartone | 1 |
| Bob Bode | 1 |
| Kenji Okazaki | 1 |
| Scott Kalitta | 1 |
| Rick Johnson | 1 |
| John Collins | 1 |
| Sherm Gunn | 1 |
| Jim Dunn | 1 |
| Gene Snow | 1 |
| Craig Epperly | 1 |
| Denny Savage | 1 |
| Johnny White | 1 |
| Jim Liberman | 1 |
| Dave Condit | 1 |
| Shirl Greer | 1 |
| Gary Burgin | 1 |
| Ron Colson | 1 |
| Frank Hall | 1 |
| Pat Foster | 1 |
| Dave Beebe | 1 |
| Larry Fullerton | 1 |
| Larry Arnold | 1 |
| Sam Miller | 1 |
| Dick Harrell | 1 |
| Butch Maas | 1 |
| Phil Castronovo | 1 |
| Larry Reyes | 1 |
| Clare Sanders | 1 |
| Doug Thorley | 1 |
| Tom Grove | 1 |
| Ed Schartman | 1 |
| Danny Ongais | 1 |

== Sources ==
- Burk, Jeff. "50 Years of Funny Cars: Part 3" in Drag Racer, November 2016, pp. 52–64.
- McClurg, Bob. "50 Years of Funny Cars: Part 2" in Drag Racer, November 2016, pp. 35–50.
- Taylor, Thom. "Beauty Beyond the Twilight Zone" in Hot Rod, April 2017, pp. 30–43.
- Wallace, Dave. "50 Years of Funny Cars: Part 1" in Drag Racer, November 2016, pp. 21–32.
