= Keith Black (engineer) =

American drag racing engineer (1926–1991)

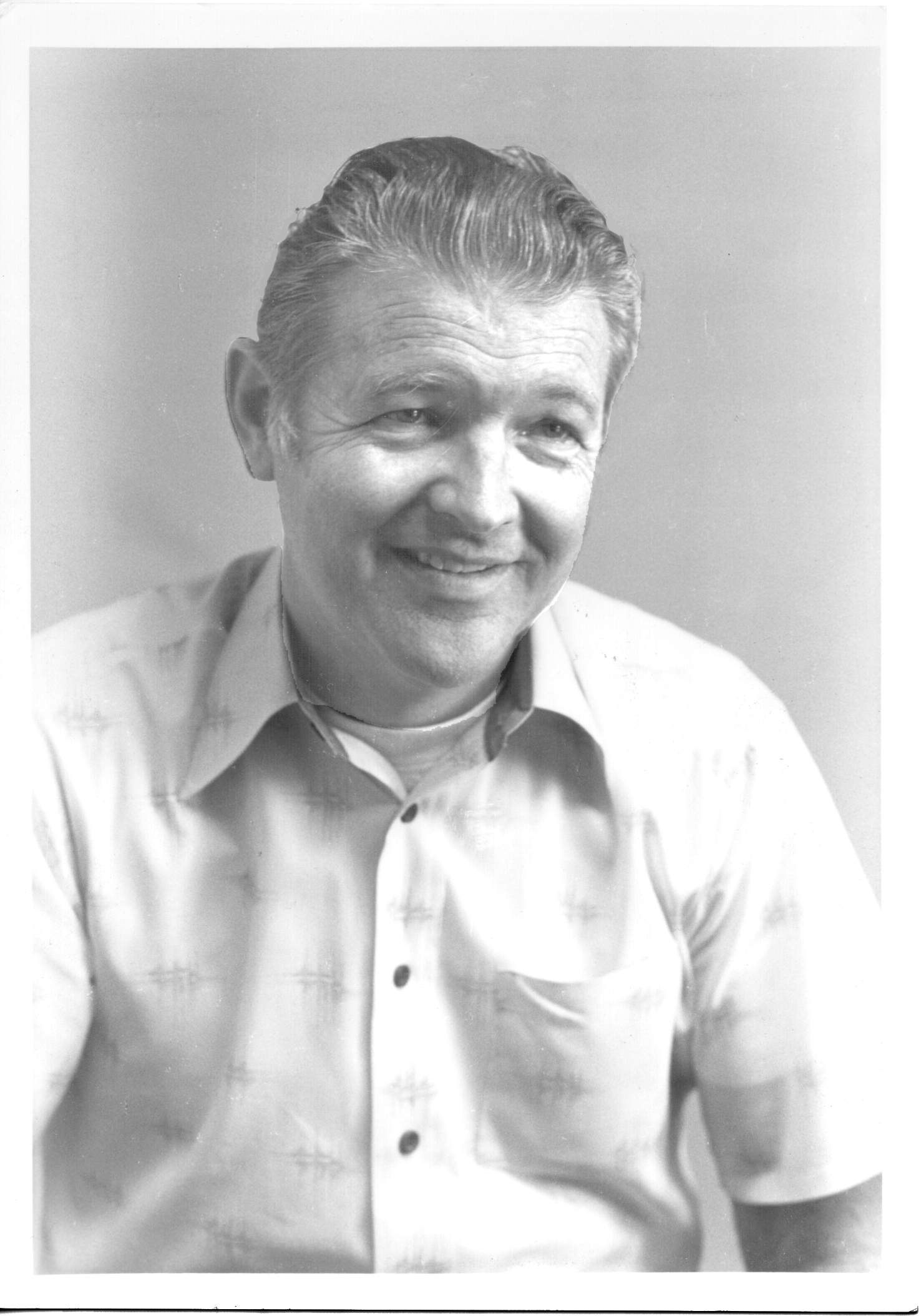
- Born: June 25, 1926; Huntington Park, California, U.S.
- Died: May 13, 1991 (aged 65); Los Angeles, California, U.S.
- Resting place: Rose Hills Mortuary, Whittier, California
- Known for: Contributions to the American automotive industry

Keith Black (June 25, 1926 – May 13, 1991), born Robert Keith Black, was an American producer of high performance drag racing engines, often used in Top Fuel and Tractor pulling applications.

== Racing ==
Black first made a name for himself in the mid-1940s in boat racing. He set a world record in his second time out at Salton Sea. People liked his engines, and he quickly started a business out of his garage.

He opened Keith Black Racing Engines (KBRE) in 1959. By 1961, his boat racing exploits included nearly 50 international and national records.

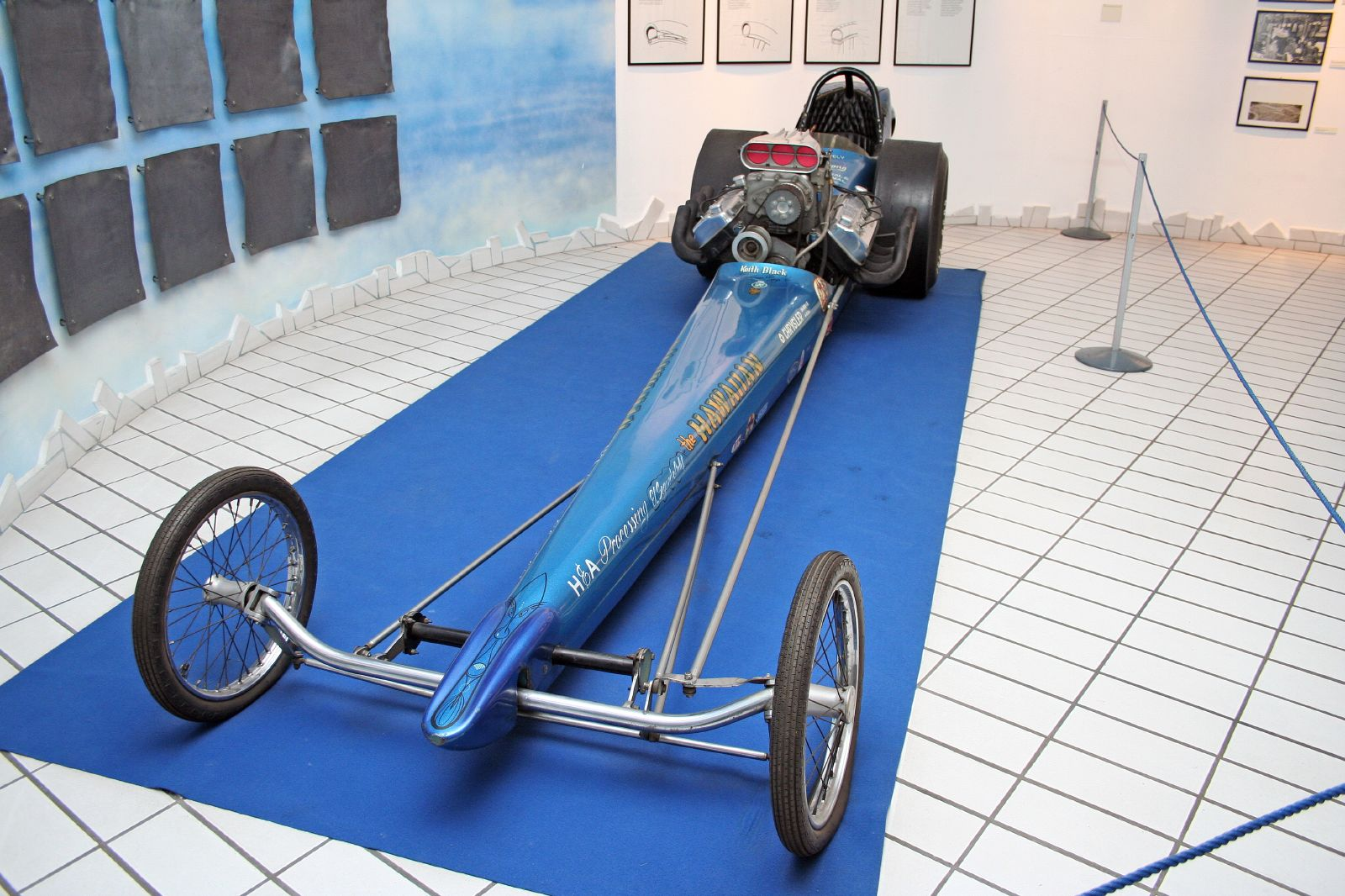
Hawaiian dragster with Keith Black engine in Museo Nazionale dell'Automobile in Turin.

Drag racing teams heard about his boat racing engines, and he was convinced by friend Tommy Greer to build a drag racing motor for the Greer-Black-Prudhomme Top Fuel dragster. In 1962 and 1963, the team won over 250 rounds to less than 25 losses. Black spent time in the late 1960s with Roland Leong's Hawaiian Top Fuel dragsters, and in the early 1970s with the Plymouth Barracuda Funny Car campaigned by "Big John" Mazmanian.

== Engineer ==
Chrysler contracted Black to develop a marine racing program in 1965.

Ed Donovan introduced the specialized aluminum engine block for nitro drag racing in 1971; the "Donovan 417" was based on a 1958 Chrysler 392 hemi. Black's aluminum engine blocks would dominate the market by the end of the decade. The engines Keith Black produced were based on the Chrysler 426 Hemi, Chevy Big Block, and Oldsmobile Big Block designs, but cut from virgin aluminum castings and built to the customer's specifications.

Between 1975 and 1984, all National Records in the Top Fuel category were held by Black Racing engines, prompting Hot Rod Magazine to name Black as one of their 'Top 100 Hot Rodders' of all-time. In the mid 1980s, KBRE introduced its line of GM-offspring blocks, which were intended for gasoline, and soon after, Chevrolet built the Keith Black Camaro.

Black died from complications due to brain cancer in 1991. He was treated by noted neurosurgeon of the same name, Keith Black at UCLA Medical Center.

== Awards ==
Black was inducted in the Motorsports Hall of Fame of America in 1995.
