= List of African-American NASCAR drivers =

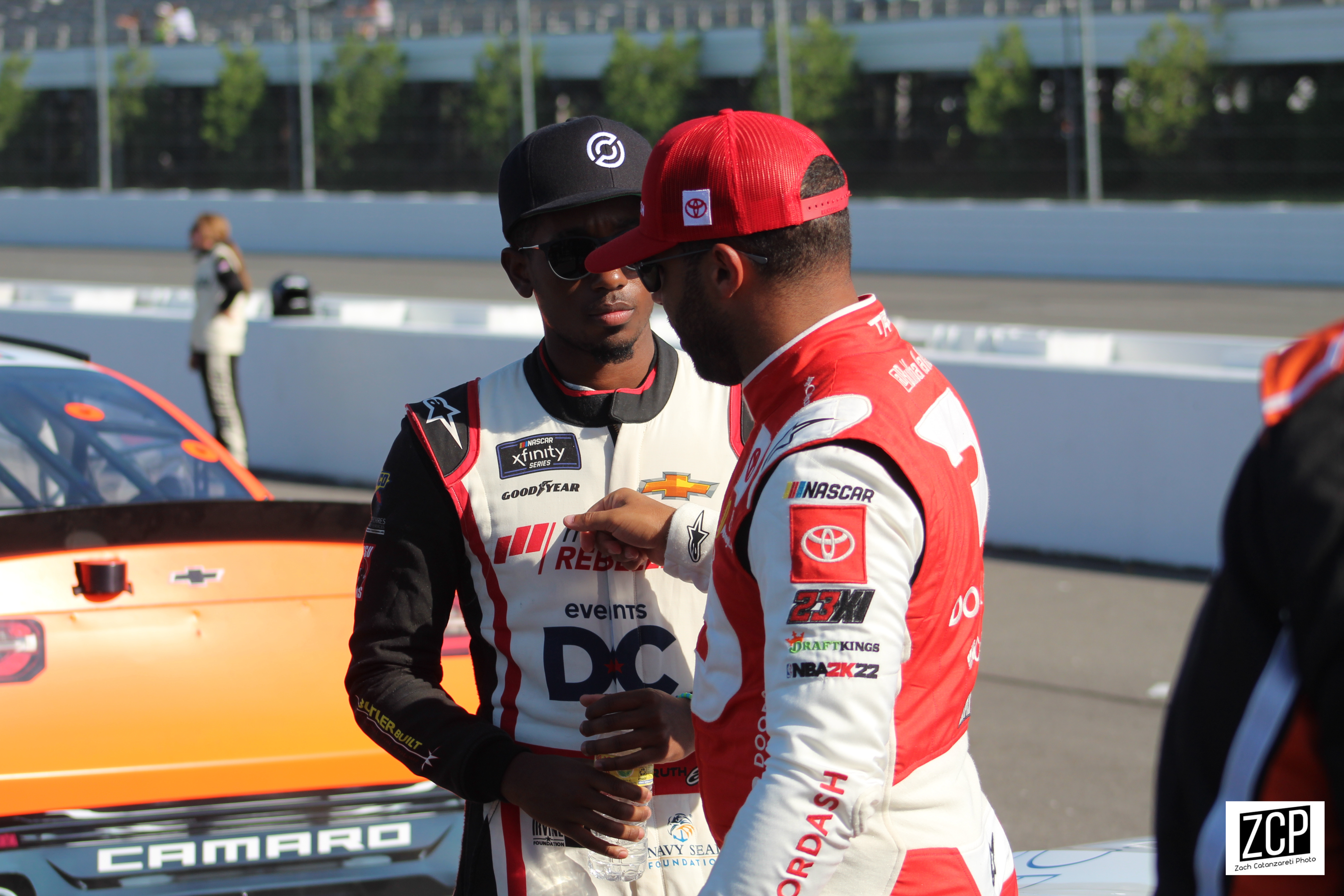
Rajah Caruth (left) and Bubba Wallace (right) talking on pit road during the 2022 Pocono race weekend

This is a list of NASCAR drivers who have raced in one of its national or touring series who are African Americans. Many current drivers and some former drivers have previously been or are currently members of the NASCAR Driver Development Program (formerly known as Drive for Diversity).

Wendell Scott (one win) and Bubba Wallace (three wins) are the only two drivers to have won NASCAR Cup Series races. Wallace also has six wins and is the first African-American winner in the Truck Series. The only other African-American winner in the Truck Series is Rajah Caruth, who has two wins. So far, there has not been an African-American driver who has won an Xfinity Series race.

== Current drivers ==
These African-American drivers competed in NASCAR in 2025. All statistics in this table are as of July 27, 2025.

Driver	Image	Home state	Current team and series	Total national series starts	Total national series wins	NCS starts	NCS wins	NXS starts	NCTS starts	NCTS wins	R-R source
Rajah Caruth (Note: Caruth has an Afro-Caribbean origin, since he has a Vincentian father and a Vincentian-Barbadian mother.)		(Washington, D.C.) Washington, D.C.	Truck Series (full-time); No. 71, Spire Motorsports & Xfinity Series (part-time); No. 32, Jordan Anderson Racing	85	2	0	0	20	65	2	
Jesse Iwuji		Texas	Xfinity Series (part-time); No. 91, DGM Racing with Jesse Iwuji Motorsports	34	0	0	0	18	16	0	
Blake Lothian		Massachusetts	ARCA Menards Series West (full-time); No. 51, Strike Mamba Racing	3	0	0	0	0	3	0	
Lavar Scott		New Jersey	ARCA Menards Series (full-time); No. 6, Rev Racing & Xfinity Series (part-time); No. 45, Alpha Prime Racing	1	0	0	0	1	0	0	
Bubba Wallace		Alabama	Cup Series (full-time); No. 23, 23XI Racing	416	9	277	3	88	51	6	

== Inactive and retired drivers ==
Driver	Image	Home state	First year active	Last year active	Total national series starts	Total national series wins	NCS starts	NCS wins	NXS starts	NXS wins	NCTS starts	NCTS wins	R-R source
Chase Austin		Kansas	2007	2010	9	0	0	0	6	0	3	0	
Randy Bethea		Tennessee	1975	1975	1	0	1	0	0	0	0	0	
Elias Bowie		California	1955	1955	1	0	1	0	0	0	0	0	
Marc Davis		Maryland	2008	2011	13	0	0	0	10	0	3	0	
Bruce Driver		New Jersey	1999	1999	1	0	0	0	0	0	1	0	
Ryan Gifford		Tennessee	2013	2014	2	0	0	0	2	0	0	0	
Bill Lester		(Georgia (U.S. state)) Georgia	1999	2021	146	0	2	0	1	0	143	0	
Bobby Norfleet		(Georgia (U.S. state)) Georgia	2000	2000	1	0	0	0	0	0	1	0	
Willy T. Ribbs		California	1986	2001	26	0	3	0	0	0	23	0	
Charlie Scott		(Georgia (U.S. state)) Georgia	1956	1956	1	0	1	0	0	0	0	0	
Wendell Scott		Virginia	1961	1973	509	1	509	1	0	0	0	0	
Preston Tutt		(Georgia (U.S. state)) Georgia	2001	2001	1	0	0	0	0	0	1	0	
Armani Williams		Michigan	2021	2024	9	0	0	0	2	0	7	0	
George Wiltshire		(New York (state)) New York	1968	1987	2	0	2	0	0	0	0	0	
Tim Woods III		California	2001	2003	4	0	0	0	0	0	4	0	

== See also ==
- List of foreign-born NASCAR race winners
- List of female NASCAR drivers
- List of Canadian NASCAR drivers
- List of Hispanic and Latin American NASCAR drivers
- List of Asian NASCAR drivers
