= List of Asian NASCAR drivers =

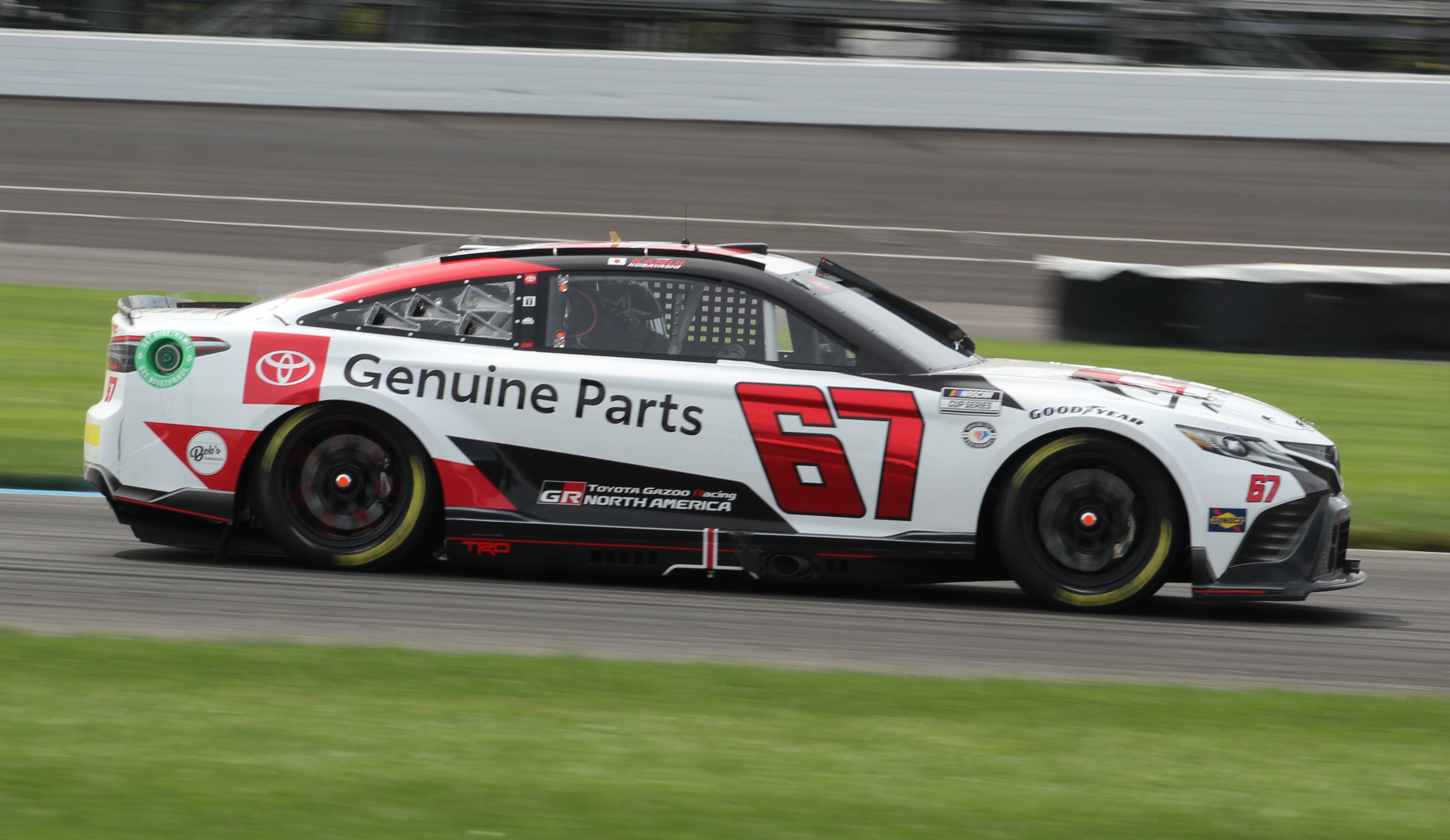
Kamui Kobayashi was the most recent Asian driver to compete in the NASCAR Cup Series.

This is a list of drivers with nationalities from Asian countries to compete in at least one NASCAR event in its top three national series (Cup, NOAPS, Truck).

The first Asian driver to compete in a NASCAR national series event was Toshio Suzuki, when he competed in one 1996 Busch Series race. The first Asian driver to compete in NASCAR's top series (Cup Series) was Hideo Fukuyama at the 2002 MBNA Platinum 400 at Dover Motor Speedway. Shigeaki Hattori, the third Asian driver to race in a national series event, later went on to become a team owner at Hattori Racing Enterprises, which would win the 2018 NASCAR Camping World Truck Series championship. Narain Karthikeyan was the first Indian driver to compete in a national series, who competed part time in the 2010 NASCAR Camping World Truck Series season between stints in Formula One.

Kyle Larson, the 2021 and 2025 NASCAR Cup Series champion and winner of 32 NASCAR Cup races, is a Japanese American. In 2016, Ryan Ellis became the first Japanese American to race in a Toyota manufactured Cup series car, which is a Japan-based company and only current foreign NASCAR manufacturer.

== Active drivers ==
=== Active drivers from Asian countries ===
These drivers have competed in at least one NCS, NOAPS, or NCTS event in 2025. Statistics accurate as of July 14, 2026.

| Driver | Image | Country | Current team and series | Total national series starts | Total national series wins | NCS starts | NCS wins | NOAPS starts | NOAPS wins | NCTS starts | NCTS wins |
|---|---|---|---|---|---|---|---|---|---|---|---|
| Alon Day | | Israel (Note: Israel is geographically located in the Levant, a subregion of West Asia.) | O'Reilly Auto Parts Series (part-time) No. 24, Sam Hunt Racing | 8 | 0 | 2 | 0 | 4 | 0 | 2 | 0 |
| Takuma Koga | | Japan | O'Reilly Auto Parts Series (part-time); No. 35, Joey Gase Motorsports with Scott Osteen | 1 | 0 | 0 | 0 | 1 | 0 | 0 | 0 |
| Akinori Ogata | | Japan | Truck Series (part-time); No. 63, Akinori Performance | 27 | 0 | 0 | 0 | 10 | 0 | 17 | 0 |

=== Active drivers who are Asian Americans ===
| Driver | Image | Home state | Country of ancestry | Current team and series | Total national series starts | Total national series wins | NCS starts | NCS wins | NOAPS starts | NOAPS wins | NCTS starts | NCTS wins |
|---|---|---|---|---|---|---|---|---|---|---|---|---|
| Ryan Ellis | | California | Japan | O'Rielly Auto Parts Series No. 02 Young's Motorsports | 217 | 0 | 6 | 0 | 185 | 0 | 26 | 0 |
| Kyle Larson | | California | Japan | Cup Series No. 5 Hendrick Motorsports | 553 | 55 | 413 | 32 | 123 | 19 | 17 | 4 |

"Top national series starts/wins" is the accumulation of starts/wins in the top three national series, and does not include any ARCA Menards Series participations.

== Inactive and retired drivers ==
=== Inactive and retired drivers from Asian countries ===
These drivers have either retired or have not competed in a NCS, NOAPS, or NCTS event since 2024.

| Driver | Country | First year active | Last year active | Total national series starts | Total national series wins | NCS starts | NCS wins | NOAPS starts | NOAPS wins | NCTS starts | NCTS wins | Best career race finish (if no wins) |
|---|---|---|---|---|---|---|---|---|---|---|---|---|
| Hideo Fukuyama | Japan | 2002 | 2003 | 4 | 0 | 4 | 0 | 0 | 0 | 0 | 0 | 33rd (NCS, 2002) |
| Shigeaki Hattori | Japan | 2004 | 2005 | 10 | 0 | 0 | 0 | 0 | 0 | 10 | 0 | 24th (NTS, 2005) |
| Ed Jones (Note: Jones is a British citizen who was born and raised in the United Arab Emirates. He has competed under the flags of both countries throughout his career.) | United Arab Emirates | 2023 | 2024 | 6 | 0 | 0 | 0 | 5 | 0 | 1 | 0 | 5th (NOAPS, 2024) |
| Narain Karthikeyan | India | 2010 | 2010 | 9 | 0 | 0 | 0 | 0 | 0 | 9 | 0 | 11th (NTS, 2010) |
| Kamui Kobayashi | Japan | 2023 | 2024 | 2 | 0 | 2 | 0 | 0 | 0 | 0 | 0 | 29th (NCS, 2024) |
| Kenko Miura | Japan | 2022 | 2024 | 1 | 0 | 0 | 0 | 0 | 0 | 1 | 0 | 33rd (NTS, 2022) |
| Toshio Suzuki | Japan | 1996 | 1996 | 1 | 0 | 0 | 0 | 1 | 0 | 0 | 0 | 33rd (NOAPS, 1996) |

"Top national series starts/wins" is the accumulation of starts/wins in the top three national series, and does not include any ARCA Menards Series participations.

== See also ==
- List of foreign-born NASCAR race winners
- List of female NASCAR drivers
- List of African-American NASCAR drivers
- List of Canadian NASCAR drivers
- List of Hispanic and Latin American NASCAR drivers
