= List of Hispanic and Latin American NASCAR drivers =

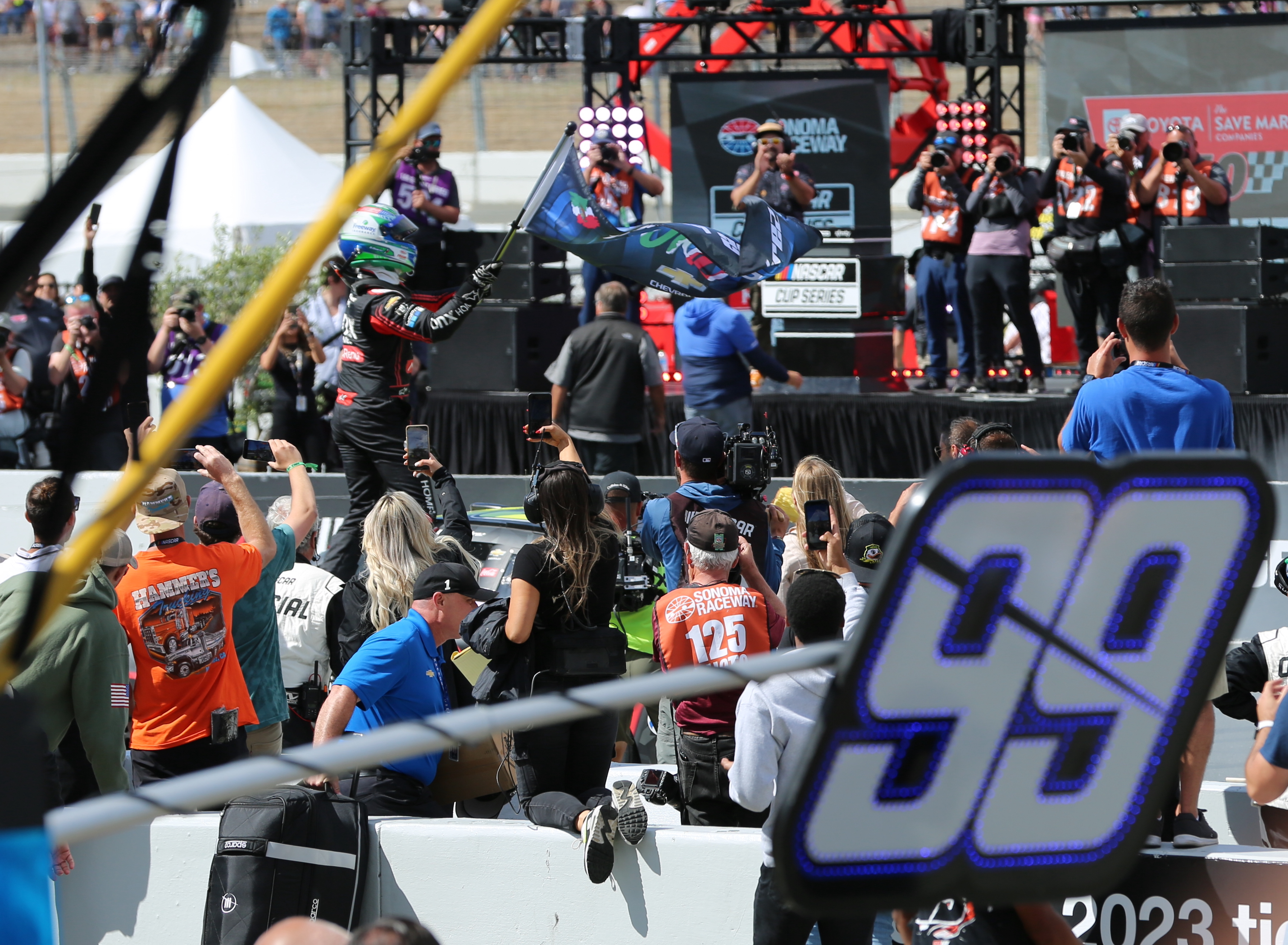
Daniel Suárez celebrating his first Cup Series win at Sonoma in 2022

This is a list of NASCAR drivers with nationalities from Latin-American countries or are Hispanic and Latino Americans that have raced in at least one of its top three national series event (Cup, Xfinity and Truck), excluding the NASCAR Mexico Series and NASCAR Brasil Sprint Race.

Many of the current drivers and some of the former drivers have previously been or are currently members of the NASCAR Driver Development Program (formerly known as Drive for Diversity).

Juan Pablo Montoya (from Colombia) and Daniel Suárez (from Mexico) are the only two drivers born in Latin-American countries to win in the Cup Series. Both of them have also won in the Xfinity Series and Suárez has also won in the Truck Series. Nelson Piquet Jr. (from Brazil) won a race in the Xfinity Series and 2 races in the Truck Series but never won a Cup Series race. Aric Almirola, who is Cuban American, has won multiple races in each of NASCAR's top 3 series.

== Active drivers ==
=== Active drivers from Latin-American countries ===
These drivers competed in NASCAR in 2025. All statistics in this table are as of June 19, 2025.

Driver	Image	Country	Current team and series	Total national series starts	Total national series wins	NCS starts	NCS wins	NXS starts	NXS wins	NCTS starts	NCTS wins	R-R source
Baltazar Leguizamón		Argentina	Xfinity Series (part-time); No. 35, Joey Gase Motorsports	1	0	0	0	1	0	0	0	
Andrés Pérez de Lara		Mexico	Truck Series (full-time); No. 77, Spire Motorsports & Xfinity Series (part-time); No. 91, DGM Racing	16	0	0	0	1	0	15	0	
Rubén Rovelo		Mexico	Xfinity Series (part-time); No. 35, Joey Gase Motorsports	1	0	0	0	1	0	0	0	
Daniel Suárez		Mexico	Cup Series (full-time); No. 99, Trackhouse Racing & Xfinity Series (part-time); No. 9, JR Motorsports	420	8	336	3	89	4	29	1	

=== Active drivers who are Hispanic and Latino Americans ===
These drivers competed in NASCAR in 2025. All statistics in this table are as of June 19, 2025.

Driver	Image	Home state	Country of ancestry	Current team and series	Total national series starts	Total national series wins	NCS starts	NCS wins	NXS starts	NXS wins	NCTS starts	NCTS wins	Sources
Aric Almirola		Florida	Cuba	Xfinity Series (part-time); No. 19, Joe Gibbs Racing	662	13 (Note: Almirola's win in the 2007 AT&T 250 at the Milwaukee Mile (where he was replaced by Denny Hamlin during the race who went on to win) is included since Almirola was the driver who started the race in the car which officially credits him with the win.)	460	3	124	8	78	2	
Jake Garcia		(Georgia (U.S. state)) Georgia	Mexico	Truck Series (full-time); No. 13, ThorSport Racing & Xfinity Series (part-time); No. 29, RSS Racing	63	0	0	0	0	0	63	0	
Ty Gibbs		North Carolina	Mexico	Cup Series (full-time); No. 54, Joe Gibbs Racing	214	14	159	2	66	12	0	0	
Brad Perez		Florida	Dominican Republic & Puerto Rico	Xfinity Series (part-time); No. 45, Alpha Prime Racing	21	0	0	0	16	0	5	0	
Vicente Salas		California	Mexico	Xfinity Series (part-time); No. 45, Alpha Prime Racing	3	0	0	0	1	0	2	0	
Nick Sanchez		Florida	Cuba	Xfinity Series (full-time); No. 48, Big Machine Racing & Truck Series (part-time); No. 07, Spire Motorsports	72	0	0	0	25	1	47	2	
Ryan Vargas		California	Mexico	NASCAR Canada Series (full-time); No. 28, DJK Racing & ARCA Menards Series (part-time); No. 67, Maples Motorsports	78	0	0	0	71	0	7	0	

== Inactive and retired drivers ==
=== Inactive and retired drivers from Latin-American countries ===
Driver	Image	Country	First year active	Last year active	Total national series starts	Total national series wins	NCS starts	NCS wins	NXS starts	NXS wins	NCTS starts	NCTS wins	R-R source
Enrique Baca		Mexico	2017	2017	2	0	0	0	2	0	0	0	
Juan Carlos Blum		Mexico	2012	2013	13	0	0	0	13	0	0	0	
Raul Cilloniz		Peru	1959	1959	2	0	2	0	0	0	0	0	
Carlos Contreras		Mexico	1999	2016	110	0	0	0	35	0	75	0	
Enrique Contreras III		Mexico	2014	2016	4	0	0	0	1	0	3	0	
Eduardo Dibós		Peru	1959	1959	3	0	3	0	0	0	0	0	
Milka Duno		Venezuela	2014	2014	3	0	0	0	2	0	1	0	
Adrián Fernández		Mexico	2005	2008	10	0	0	0	10	0	0	0	
Christian Fittipaldi		Brazil	2001	2003	19	0	16	0	3	0	0	0	
Alex García		Venezuela	2007	2008	5	0	0	0	5	0	0	0	
Rubén García Novoa		Mexico	2005	2005	1	0	0	0	1	0	0	0	
Rubén García Jr.		Mexico	2014	2014	3	0	0	0	3	0	0	0	
Jorge Goeters		Mexico	2005	2007	11	0	1	0	10	0	0	0	
Patrick Goeters		Mexico	2006	2006	1	0	0	0	1	0	0	0	
Juan Manuel González		Mexico	2019	2019	1	0	0	0	0	0	1	0	
Max Gutiérrez		Mexico	2022	2023	5	0	0	0	0	0	5	0	
Michel Jourdain Jr.		Mexico	2005	2008	33	0	0	0	26	0	7	0	
Rogelio López		Mexico	2006	2007	2	0	0	0	2	0	0	0	
Rafael Martínez		Mexico	2005	2008	2	0	0	0	2	0	0	0	
Juan Pablo Montoya		Colombia	2006	2024	279	3	256	2	23	1	0	0	
Jimmy Morales		Mexico	2005	2006	2	0	0	0	2	0	0	0	
Miguel Paludo		Brazil	2010	2023	84	0	0	0	11	0	73	0	
Carlos Pardo		Mexico	2006	2006	1	0	0	0	1	0	0	0	
Rubén Pardo		Mexico	2007	2015	9	0	0	0	7	0	2	0	
Antonio Pérez		Mexico	2007	2010	7	0	0	0	7	0	0	0	
Nelson Piquet Jr.		Brazil	2010	2016	93	3	1	0	38	1	54	2	
Alex Popow		Venezuela	2012	2012	1	0	0	0	1	0	0	0	
Germán Quiroga		Mexico	2007	2016	54	0	0	0	1	0	53	0	
José Luis Ramírez		Mexico	2005	2008	4	0	0	0	2	0	2	0	
Mara Reyes		Mexico	2005	2005	1	0	0	0	1	0	0	0	
Pedro Rodríguez		Mexico	1959	1971	6	0	6	0	0	0	0	0	
Eliseo Salazar		Chile	1997	1997	1	0	0	0	0	0	1	0	

==== Notes ====
- Other drivers who had an entry in a top three national series event but failed to qualify: Emiliano Zapata, Jaime Guerrero, Roberto Guerrero, Eduardo Goeters, Freddy Tame, and Eddie Troconis

=== Inactive and retired drivers from territories of the United States ===
Driver	Image	Country	First year active	Last year active	Total national series starts	Total national series wins	NCS starts	NCS wins	NXS starts	NXS wins	NCTS starts	NCTS wins	R-R source
Victor Gonzalez Jr.		Puerto Rico	2009	2018	11	0	2	0	8	0	1	0	

=== Inactive and retired drivers who are Hispanic and Latino Americans ===
Driver	Image	Home state	Country of ancestry	First year active	Last year active	Total national series starts	Total national series wins	NCS starts	NCS wins	NXS starts	NXS wins	NCTS starts	NCTS wins	R-R source
Jairo Avila Jr.		California	Colombia	2018	2020	8	0	0	0	8	0	0	0	
Andre Castro		(New York (state)) New York	Colombia	2023	2023	2	0	0	0	2	0	0	0	
Ruben Garcia		California	Mexico	1984	1988	9	0	9	0	0	0	0	0	
Michael Lira		Florida	Peru	2016	2016	1	0	0	0	1	0	0	0	

== See also ==
- List of foreign-born NASCAR race winners
- List of female NASCAR drivers
- List of African-American NASCAR drivers
- List of Canadian NASCAR drivers
- List of Asian NASCAR drivers
