= List of Canadian NASCAR drivers =

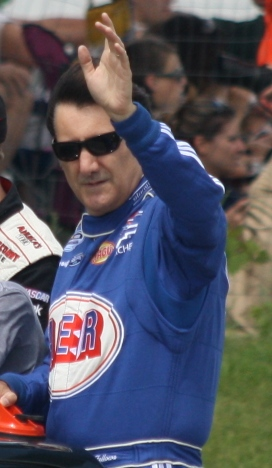
Ron Fellows has won six NASCAR national series races (four in Xfinity, two in Truck).

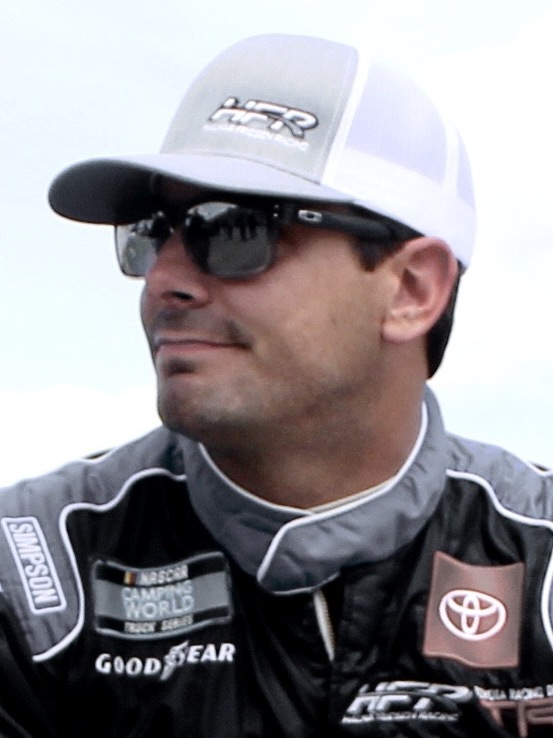
Stewart Friesen currently runs full-time in the Truck Series, where he has won four races.

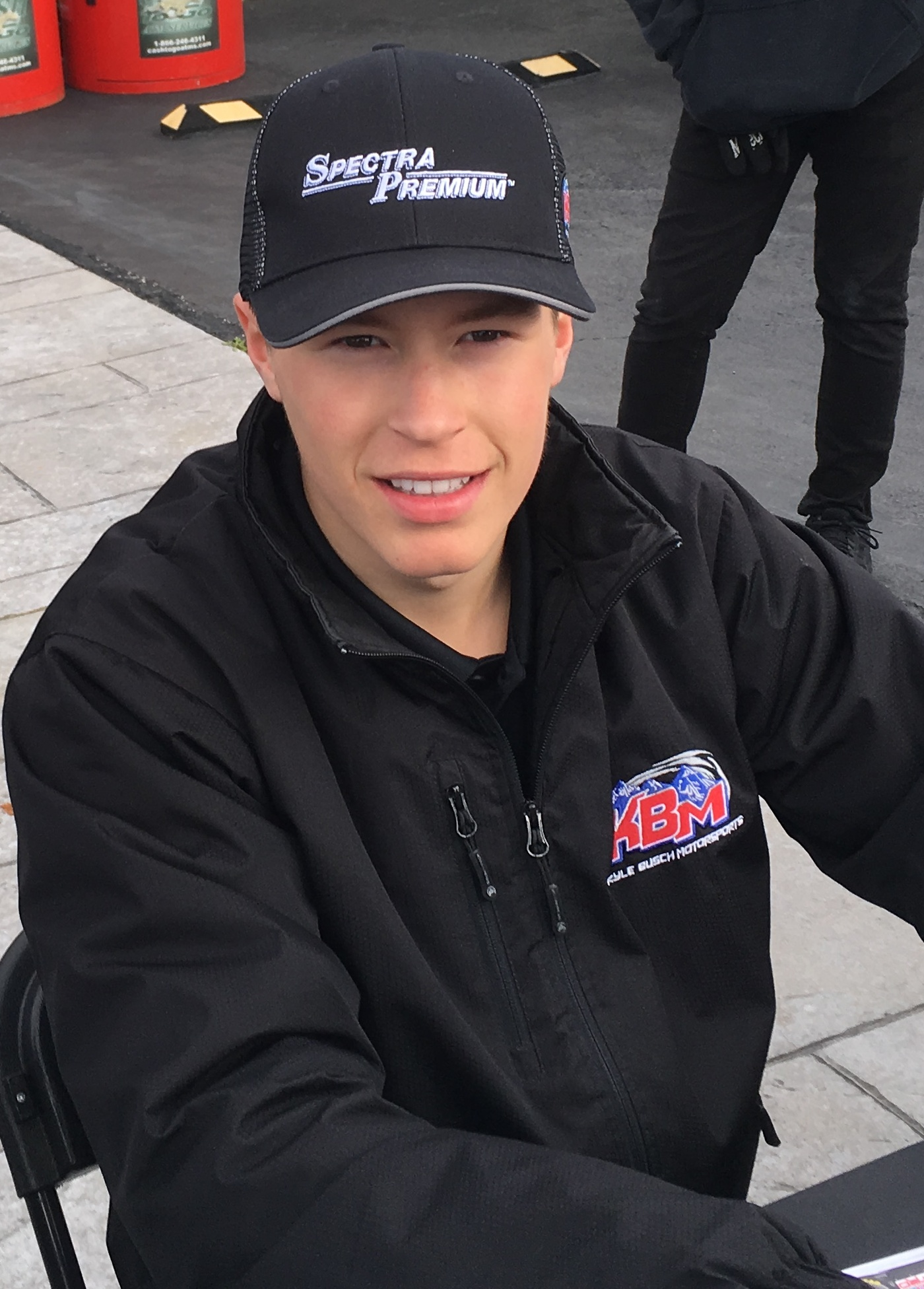
Raphaël Lessard has won one Truck Series race.

This is a list of Canadians who have raced in at least one NASCAR national series event.

Earl Ross is the only Canadian to have won a NASCAR Cup Series race. Ron Fellows is the only driver to have won at least one race in more than one NASCAR national series, as he has four wins in the Xfinity Series and two wins in the Truck Series. The other Canadian drivers to have won a NASCAR national series race are former driver Larry Pollard in the Xfinity Series (one win) and active drivers Stewart Friesen (four wins) and Raphaël Lessard (one win) in the Truck Series.

== Active drivers ==
All statistics in this table are as of July 1, 2025.

These drivers from Canada are competing in any of NASCAR's national or touring series in 2025, excluding the NASCAR Pinty's Series, which is NASCAR's Canadian series and consists almost entirely of Canadian drivers.

Driver	Image	Current team and series	Total national series starts	NCS starts	NXS starts	NCTS starts	NCTS wins	AMS starts	Debut season(s)	R-R source
Amber Balcaen		ARCA Menards Series (part-time); No. 70, Nitro Motorsports	0	0	0	0	0	45	2017 (ARCA East); 2021 (ARCA West); 2022 (main ARCA)	
Stewart Friesen		Truck Series (full-time); No. 52, Halmar Friesen Racing	200	1	0	199	4	0	2021 (Cup); 2016 (Truck)	
Alex Labbé		Xfinity Series (part-time); No. 07, SS-Green Light Racing & Truck Series (part-time); No. 22, Reaume Brothers Racing	160	0	159	1	0	0	2016 (Xfinity); 2025 (Truck)	
Derek White		Truck Series (part-time); No. 2, Reaume Brothers Racing & No. 69, MBM Motorsports & ARCA Menards Series (part-time); No. 31, Rise Motorsports	30	1	22	7	0	1	2015 (Cup); 2012 (Xfinity); 2009 (Truck); 2025 (main ARCA)	
Jason White		Truck Series (part-time); No. 22, Reaume Brothers Racing & ARCA Menards Series (part-time); No. 9, Fast Track Racing	14	0	0	14	0	7	2018 (Truck); 2019 (main ARCA)	

== Inactive and retired drivers ==
All statistics in this table are as of June 9, 2025.

These drivers have retired from racing or are inactive/without a ride in NASCAR in 2025.

Driver	Debut season	Final / most recent season	NCS starts	NCS wins	NXS starts	NXS wins	NCTS starts	NCTS wins
Serge Adams	1968	1968	3	0	0	0	0	0
Kelly Admiraal	2013	2014	0	0	4	0	0	0
Francis Affleck	1984	1984	0	0	3	0	0	0
Steve Arpin	2010	2012	0	0	9	0	5	0
Claude Aubin	1982	1982	0	0	1	0	0	0
John Banks	1974	1976	4	0	0	0	0	0
Yvon Bedard	1987	1987	0	0	1	0	0	0
Leo Bergeron	1953	1953	2	0	0	0	0	0
Don Biederman	1966	1969	42	0	0	0	0	0
Pierre Bourque	2007	2010	0	0	0	0	2	0
Buddie Boys	1984	1986	3	0	0	0	0	0
Trevor Boys	1982	2009	102	0	3	0	9	0
Wheeler Boys	2008	2009	0	0	3	0	3	0
Wallie Branston	1954	1954	1	0	0	0	0	0
Jim Bray	1962	1978	15	0	0	0	0	0
Rick Bye	1995	1995	0	0	1	0	0	0
Patrick Carpentier	2007	2016	42	0	16	0	1	0
Jerry Churchill	1971	1995	7	0	0	0	7	0
Randy Churchill	1995	1995	0	0	0	0	3	0
Terry Clattenburg	1986	1986	0	0	1	0	0	0
Dan Corcoran	2019	2019	0	0	1	0	1	0
Ray Courtemanche Jr.	2014	2014	0	0	0	0	1	0
Les Covey	1972	1973	7	0	0	0	0	0
Geoffrey Dessault	1953	1953	1	0	0	0	0	0
Doug Didero	1991	1992	0	0	3	0	0	0
Jack Donohue	1974	1976	5	0	0	0	0	0
Kevin Dowler	2004	2004	0	0	0	0	1	0
Noel Dowler	2012	2012	0	0	1	0	0	0
Maryeve Dufault	2011	2013	0	0	2	0	0	0
Yvon Duhamel	1973	1973	1	0	0	0	0	0
Jean-François Dumoulin	2009	2009	0	0	1	0	0	0
Louis-Philippe Dumoulin	2011	2012	0	0	2	0	0	0
Frog Fagan	1967	1971	20	0	0	0	0	0
Ron Fellows	1995	2013	25	0	25	4	15	2
Dean Ferri	1991	1991	0	0	2	0	0	0
J. R. Fitzpatrick	2007	2012	0	0	14	0	16	0
Dick Foley	1957	1960	7	0	0	0	0	0
Billy Foster	1966	1967	1	0	0	0	0	0
Peter Gibbons	1996	1997	0	0	2	0	0	0
Mario Gosselin	1998	2017	2	0	43	0	47	0
John Graham	2004	2017	0	0	14	0	0	0
Alex Guenette	2013	2023	0	0	7	0	3	0
Daryl Harr	2009	2014	0	0	21	0	0	0
Jason Hathaway	2017	2017	0	0	0	0	2	0
Cameron Hayley	2014	2016	0	0	0	0	49	0
Stew Hayward	2015	2015	0	0	0	0	1	0
Allen Heath	1951	1958	5	0	0	0	0	0
Cliff Hucul	1986	1986	2	0	0	0	0	0
Terry Jones	2010	2017	0	0	0	0	6	0
D. J. Kennington	2006	2019	16	0	51	0	12	0
Gary Kershaw	1981	1981	1	0	0	0	0	0
Gary Klutt	2016	2019	1	0	0	0	3	0
Roger Laperle	1982	1982	0	0	1	0	0	0
Claude Leclerc	1986	1986	0	0	1	0	0	0
Albert Lemieux	1952	1952	1	0	0	0	0	0
Raphaël Lessard	2019	2021	0	0	0	0	35	1
Randy MacDonald	1986	2008	5	0	32	0	94	0
Teri MacDonald	2002	2004	0	0	0	0	7	0
Mike MacKenzie	2007	2007	0	0	1	0	0	0
Rick O'Dell	1981	1981	1	0	0	0	0	0
Vic Parsons	1972	1973	19	0	0	0	0	0
Leo Poirier	1988	1988	0	0	1	0	0	0
Larry Pollard	1985	1990	4	0	98	1	0	0
Nick Rampling	1966	1966	3	0	0	0	0	0
Andrew Ranger	2008	2014	1	0	17	0	1	0
Laurent Rioux	1983	1984	3	0	0	0	0	0
Earl Ross	1973	1978	26	1	0	0	0	0
Martin Roy	2013	2017	0	0	24	0	1	0
Norman Schihl	1956	1956	1	0	0	0	0	0
Lloyd Shaw	1953	1953	1	0	0	0	0	0
Peter Shepherd III	2006	2018	0	0	1	0	7	0
Victor Sifton	1995	1995	0	0	1	0	0	0
Jack Simpson	1973	1978	3	0	0	0	0	0
Roy Smith	1975	1989	26	0	0	0	0	0
Dexter Stacey	2012	2023	0	0	27	0	2	0
Scott Steckly	2008	2008	0	0	1	0	0	0
Ross Surgenor	1974	1974	2	0	0	0	0	0
Alex Tagliani	2009	2020	0	0	8	0	6	0
Kat Teasdale	1997	1998	0	0	1	0	0	0
Donald Theetge	2018	2020	0	0	6	0	0	0
Robbie Thompson	1999	2000	0	0	0	0	2	0
Don Thomson Jr.	2008	2008	0	0	1	0	0	0
Jason Thom	2000	2002	0	0	0	0	6	0
Paul Tracy	2006	2008	0	0	6	0	1	0
Al Turner	1986	1986	0	0	1	0	0	0
Michael Valiante	2007	2007	0	0	1	0	0	0
Dominique Van Wieringen	2016	2016	0	0	0	0	1	0
Jacques Villeneuve	2007	2022	5	0	9	0	7	0
Dylan Westbrook	2022	2022	0	0	0	0	1	0
Jim Wilson	1955	1956	3	0	0	0	0	0

== See also ==
- List of Canadian sports personalities
- List of Canadians in the National Basketball Association
- List of Canadians in the National Football League
- List of Major League Baseball players from Canada
- List of foreign-born NASCAR race winners
- List of female NASCAR drivers
- List of African-American NASCAR drivers
- List of Hispanic and Latin American NASCAR drivers
- List of Asian NASCAR drivers
