= Billy Foster =

Canadian racing driver (1937–1967)

- Born: William Alva Foster; September 18, 1937 Victoria, British Columbia, Canada
- Died: January 20, 1967 (aged 29) Riverside, California, U.S.

Champ Car career
- 27 races run over 3 years
- Years active: 1964–1966
- Best finish: 10th – 1966
- First race: 1964 Tony Bettenhausen 200 (Milwaukee)
- Last race: 1966 Bobby Ball Memorial (Phoenix)
Wins	Podiums	Poles
0	2	0

NASCAR Cup Series career
- 1 race run over 1 year
- First race: 1966 Motor Trend 500 (Riverside)
Wins	Top tens	Poles
0	1	0

William Alva Foster (September 18, 1937 – January 20, 1967) was a Canadian racecar driver.

== Biography ==
Born in Victoria, British Columbia, Foster dropped out of high school to start his racing career.

Foster won the 1963 CAMRA (Canadian American Modified Racing Association) in 1963 in the first year of the series. He also won the Utah Copper Cup race in 1963 and 1964.

Foster also drove in the USAC Championship Car series, racing in the 1964–1966 seasons, with 28 career starts, including the 1965 and 1966 Indianapolis 500 races. He finished in the top-ten ten times, with his best finish in second position in 1966 at Atlanta.

Foster became best friends with Mario Andretti, who later claimed he would never again form a close friendship with a fellow racer because Foster's death so significantly affected him.

Foster ran a NASCAR Cup Series race at Riverside International Raceway in 1966 and finished seventh. He also competed in two NASCAR West Series races in 1965.

During practice for the 1967 Motor Trend 500 at Riverside International Raceway, Foster lost control of his car after a brake drum failed. His car hit a retaining wall then rolled. As windows nets were not yet mandatory, the momentum of the collision with the wall resulted in Foster's head striking it, causing fatal head injuries.

Foster was a cousin of Canadian stock car driver Jim Steen and musician and producer David Foster.

Foster was inducted into the Canadian Motorsport Hall of Fame in 1993.

== Indianapolis 500 results ==
Year	Chassis	Engine	Start	Finish
1965	Vollstedt	Offenhauser	6th	17th
1966	Vollstedt	Ford	12th	24th

== See also ==
- List of Canadians in NASCAR
- List of Canadians in Champ Car
- Canadian Motorsport Hall of Fame
