= Shane van Gisbergen =

New Zealand racing driver (born 1989)

- Van Gisbergen at Las Vegas Motor Speedway in 2026
- Nationality: (New Zealand) New Zealander
- Born: Shane Robert van Gisbergen; 9 May 1989 (age 37) Auckland, New Zealand
- Categorisation: FIA Gold (until 2016); FIA Platinum (2017–)

Awards
- 2025 NASCAR Cup Series Rookie of the Year

Supercars Championship career
- Current team: Triple Eight Race Engineering
- Championships: 3 (2016, 2021, 2022)
- Races: 508
- Wins: 80
- Podiums: 176
- Pole positions: 46
- 2023 position: 2nd

NASCAR Cup Series career
- 86 races run over 4 years
- Car no., team: No. 97 (Trackhouse Racing)
- 2026 position: 17th
- Best finish: 12th (2025)
- First race: 2023 Grant Park 220 (Chicago)
- Last race: 2026 Season Finale 400 (Homestead)
- First win: 2023 Grant Park 220 (Chicago)
- Last win: 2026 Toyota/Save Mart 350 (Sonoma)
Wins	Top tens	Poles
8	21	6

NASCAR O'Reilly Auto Parts Series career
- 39 races run over 3 years
- Car no., team: No. 9 (JR Motorsports)
- 2026 position: 68th
- Best finish: 12th (2024)
- First race: 2024 United Rentals 300 (Daytona)
- Last race: 2026 Pit Boss/FoodMaxx 250 (Sonoma)
- First win: 2024 Pacific Office Automation 147 (Portland)
- Last win: 2026 Pit Boss/FoodMaxx 250 (Sonoma)
Wins	Top tens	Poles
6	15	6

NASCAR FedEx Freight Truck Series career
- 5 races run over 2 years
- 2026 position: 100th
- Best finish: 63rd (2023)
- First race: 2023 TSport 200 (IRP)
- Last race: 2026 Black's Tire 250 (Richmond)
Wins	Top tens	Poles
0	3	1

ARCA Menards Series career
- 1 race run over 1 year
- Best finish: 110th (2024)
- First race: 2024 Hard Rock Bet 200 (Daytona)
Wins	Top tens	Poles
0	0	0
- Statistics up to date as of 8 November 2026.

Shane Robert van Gisbergen (born 9 May 1989), also known by his initials SVG, is a New Zealand professional racing driver. He competes full-time in the NASCAR Cup Series, driving the No. 97 Chevrolet Camaro ZL1 for Trackhouse Racing, and part-time in the NASCAR O'Reilly Auto Parts Series, driving the No. 9 Chevrolet Camaro SS for JR Motorsports. He is known for his time racing in the Supercars Championship, last driving the No. 97 Chevrolet Camaro ZL1 car for Triple Eight Race Engineering. He is a three-time Supercars Champion, winning driver's titles in 2016, 2021, and 2022. With a total of 80 wins and 46 pole positions, Van Gisbergen is fourth on the all-time wins list in the Supercars Championship. He has won the Bathurst 1000 three times, in 2020, 2022, and 2023.

Van Gisbergen also races in GT Racing, winning the 2016 Liqui Moly Bathurst 12 Hour alongside Alvaro Parente and Jonathon Webb in the McLaren 650S GT3, winning the 2016 Blancpain GT Series Endurance Cup, finishing third overall in the 2016 Intercontinental GT Challenge and finishing in second place in the 2015 24 Hours of Daytona in the GTD class.

Van Gisbergen won in his NASCAR Cup Series debut at the 2023 Grant Park 220 in Chicago driving the No. 91 for Trackhouse Racing, becoming the first driver to win in their NASCAR Cup Series debut since Indy car driver Johnny Rutherford in 1963, becoming only the seventh to do so in series history and the first driver to do it in the modern era of the sport. He also became the first New Zealander to win a race in the Cup Series. He is the winningest non-American driver in the NASCAR Cup Series and the winningest rookie in a single-season.

Van Gisbergen and Paul Morris are the only drivers to have won all three major car racing events at Mount Panorama: the Bathurst 1000, Bathurst 6 Hour and Bathurst 12 Hour.

== New Zealand racing history ==
After competing in Motocross, Quarter Midgets, and karts from 1998 to 2004, Van Gisbergen placed third in the 2004/2005 New Zealand Formula First Championship and won the associated Rookie of the Year award. Van Gisbergen had previously obtained a Speedsport Star of Tomorrow Scholarship. A win in 2005/06 New Zealand Formula Ford Championship was accompanied by another Rookie of the Year title and was followed by a second-place finish in 2006/07 Toyota Racing Series.

In 2014, Van Gisbergen co-drove to the BNT NZ Supertourers Hankook Super Series championship with primary driver Simon Evans. He won seven of the nine races in a total of the Endurance rounds, including sweeping the entire Fuchs 500 weekend at Pukekohe Park Raceway with winning race #3 in spectacular fashion, driving from one lap down.

In 2021, Van Gisbergen won the New Zealand Grand Prix held as part of the Toyota Racing Series. The event is normally held for a global field; however, it was restricted to a New Zealand-only field due to the COVID-19 pandemic, with Van Gisbergen entering as a wildcard. In 2023, Van Gisbergen competed in the South Island Endurance Series at Euromarque Motorsport Park, ran a Brabham BT62 with co-driver and car owner Dwayne Carter. The team encountered troubles early in the three-hour race when a right rear wheel came loose, sidelining the team for a number of laps to fix the car. The team completed over 30 laps after returning to the track before officially retiring from the race.

== Supercars championship ==
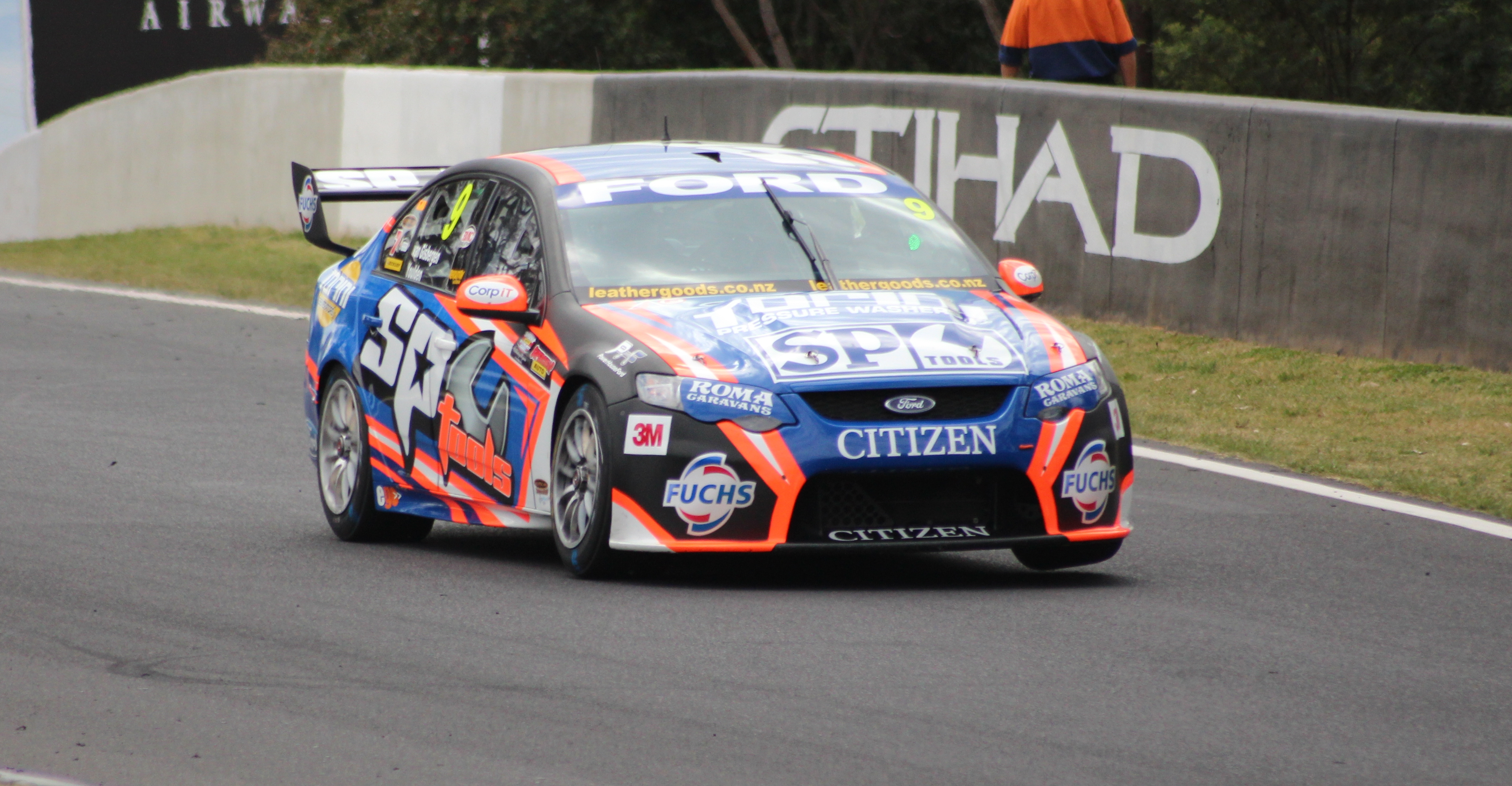
Van Gisbergen at the 2012 Bathurst 1000

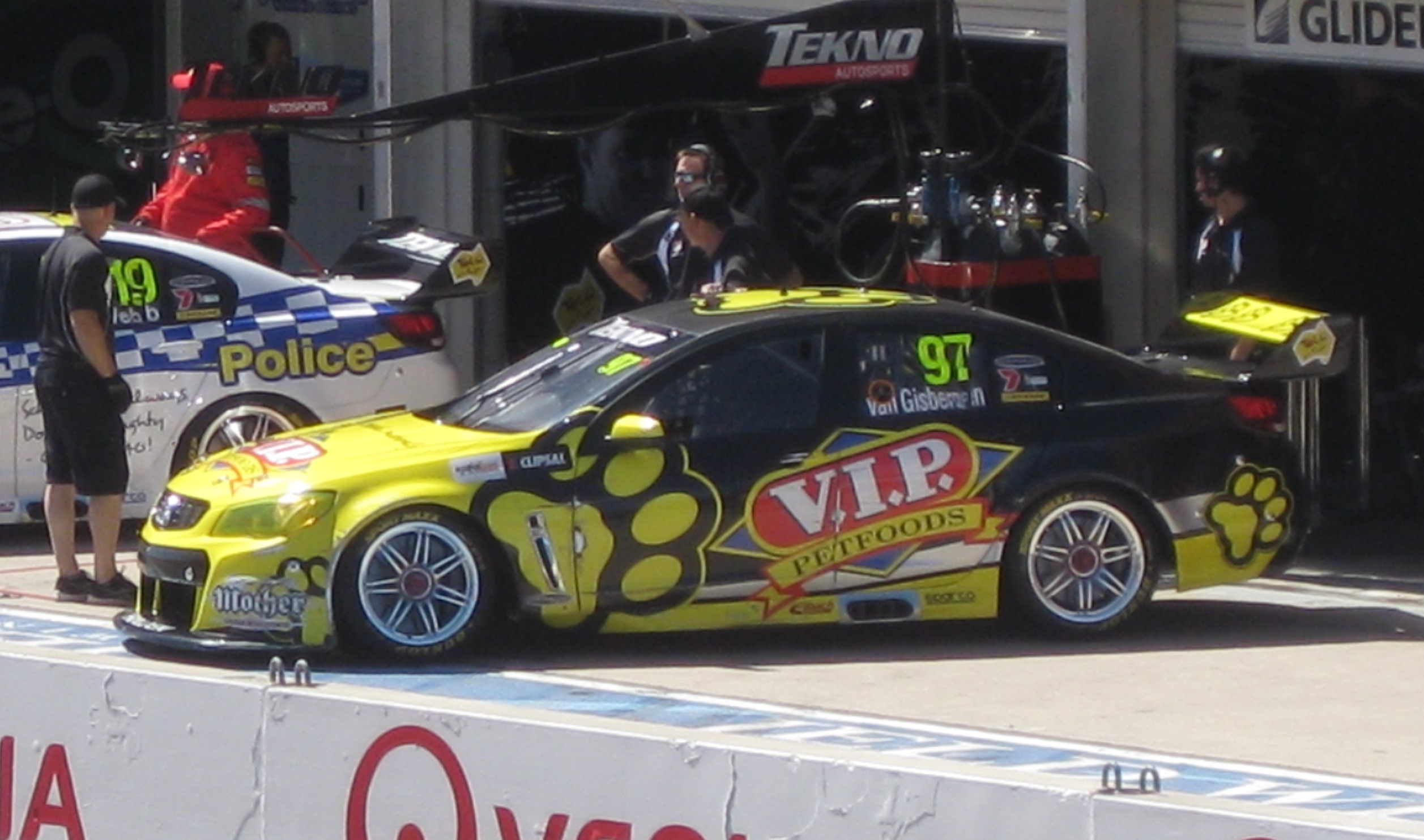
Van Gisbergen's Tekno Autosports Holden Commodore VF at the 2013 Adelaide 500

Driving for Team Kiwi Racing, Van Gisbergen became the 200th driver to start a race in a V8 Supercar at the Jim Beam 400 at Oran Park Raceway in Round 8 of 2007. Having impressed in his 2007 races, Van Gisbergen was picked up by Stone Brothers Racing in 2008. He continued with the team for five seasons until 2012, securing a best of fourth in the championship in 2011. In late 2012, he announced he would be leaving V8 Supercars but in January it emerged that he was moving to Tekno Autosports at the start of the 2013 season. Van Gisbergen faced legal action for breaking his contract with Erebus Motorsport that had purchased Stone Brothers Racing. The move to Tekno proved fruitful, with Van Gisbergen finishing runner-up in the championship in 2014.

Van Gisbergen has also shown a strong pace at the series' most famous race, the Bathurst 1000. He was in the lead in the 2009 Bathurst 1000 until pitting on lap 108 when his car would not start, resulting in a 1:14 pit stop and losing him a number of positions in the race. A near-identical issue repeated itself in the 2014 edition, where, with ten laps to go, he stalled, and the starter motor failed, costing him almost a certain victory, and he finished 16th. Van Gisbergen had started the 2014 race from pole position, his first at the event.

In 2016, Van Gisbergen moved to an expanded Triple Eight Race Engineering team alongside Jamie Whincup and Craig Lowndes. Van Gisbergen won his first race for the team at the Tasmania SuperSprint in 2016. Alexandre Prémat joined Van Gisbergen as co-driver in the Enduro Cup. The pair won the 2016 Enduro Cup, including three second-place finishes and Prémat's first race victory in the championship at the 2016 Castrol Gold Coast 600, and became the first non-Australian drivers combination to win. At Pukekohe, Van Gisbergen became the first New Zealander to lift the trophy, named in honour of Jason Richards, who died of cancer in 2011. He went on to win eight races that season and won the championship.

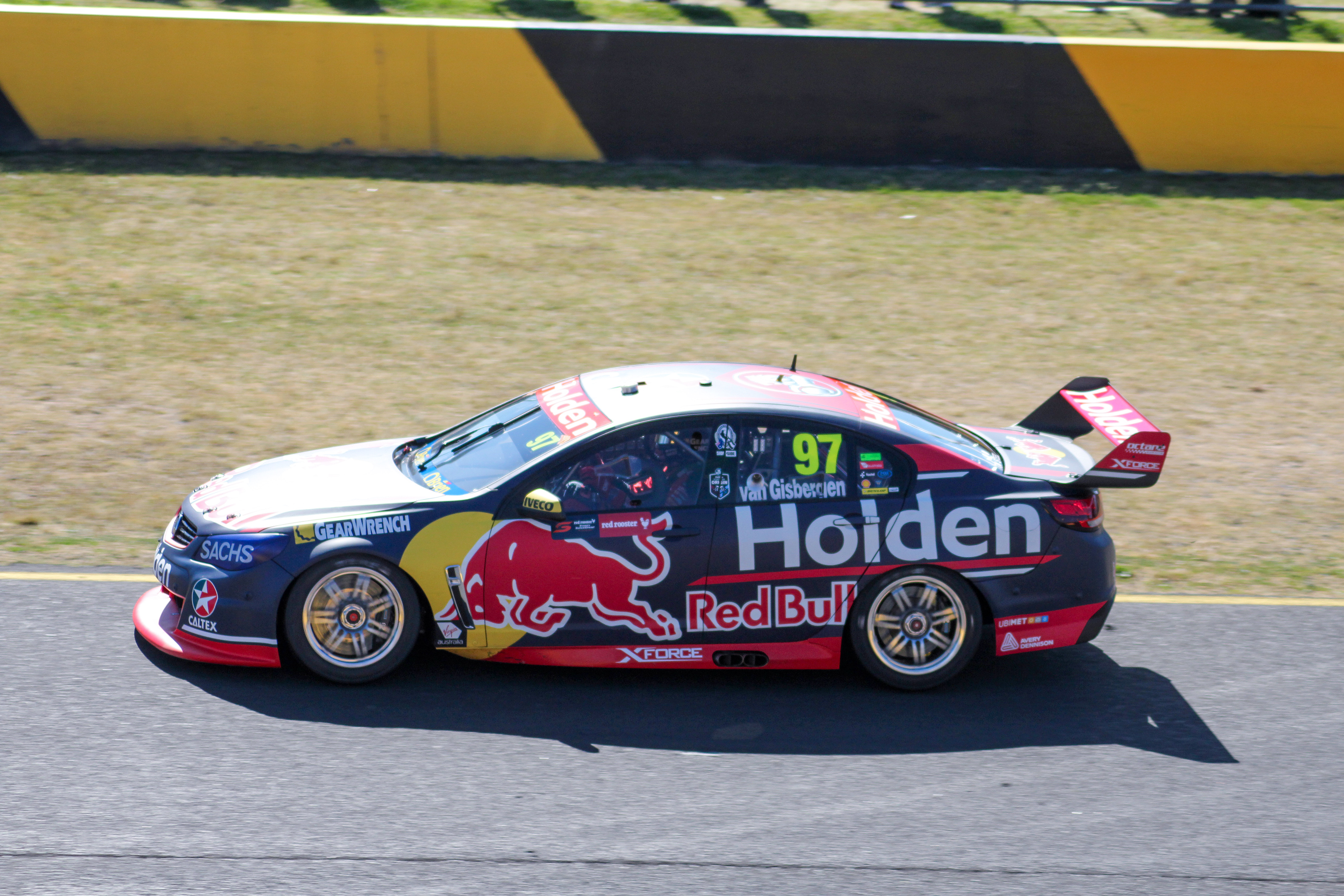
Van Gisbergen at the 2017 Sydney Motorsport Park

In 2017, Whincup and Van Gisbergen paired up again under the Red Bull Holden Racing Team banner. At Adelaide, he started his title defence with a double-victory, but finished fourth in the championship.

In 2018, Van Gisbergen won both Race 1 and Race 2 at Adelaide, driving a Holden Commodore ZB. At Townsville, Van Gisbergen won at race 18 after Whincup marked the 10th running at race 17. On 4 August, Van Gisbergen won the Sydney SuperNight 300 after a Safety Car was called in. At Tailem Bend, Van Gisbergen dominated the inaugural race at The Bend Motorsport Park, taking a near lights-to-flag win in Race 22. On 16 September, at Sandown, Van Gisbergen finished second alongside Earl Bamber. Van Gisbergen controversially escaped a penalty for spinning his wheels during a pit stop at the Auckland SuperSprint at Pukekohe.

In the final round of 2018 at Newcastle, and with the championship on the line, Van Gisbergen won race 30, but was handed a 25-second post-race penalty following an investigation into a refueling breach during his third pitstop, dropping him to fifth place. Second-place finisher Scott McLaughlin was declared the winner of the race. Van Gisbergen finished fourth in race 31 and second in the points standings, behind McLaughlin.

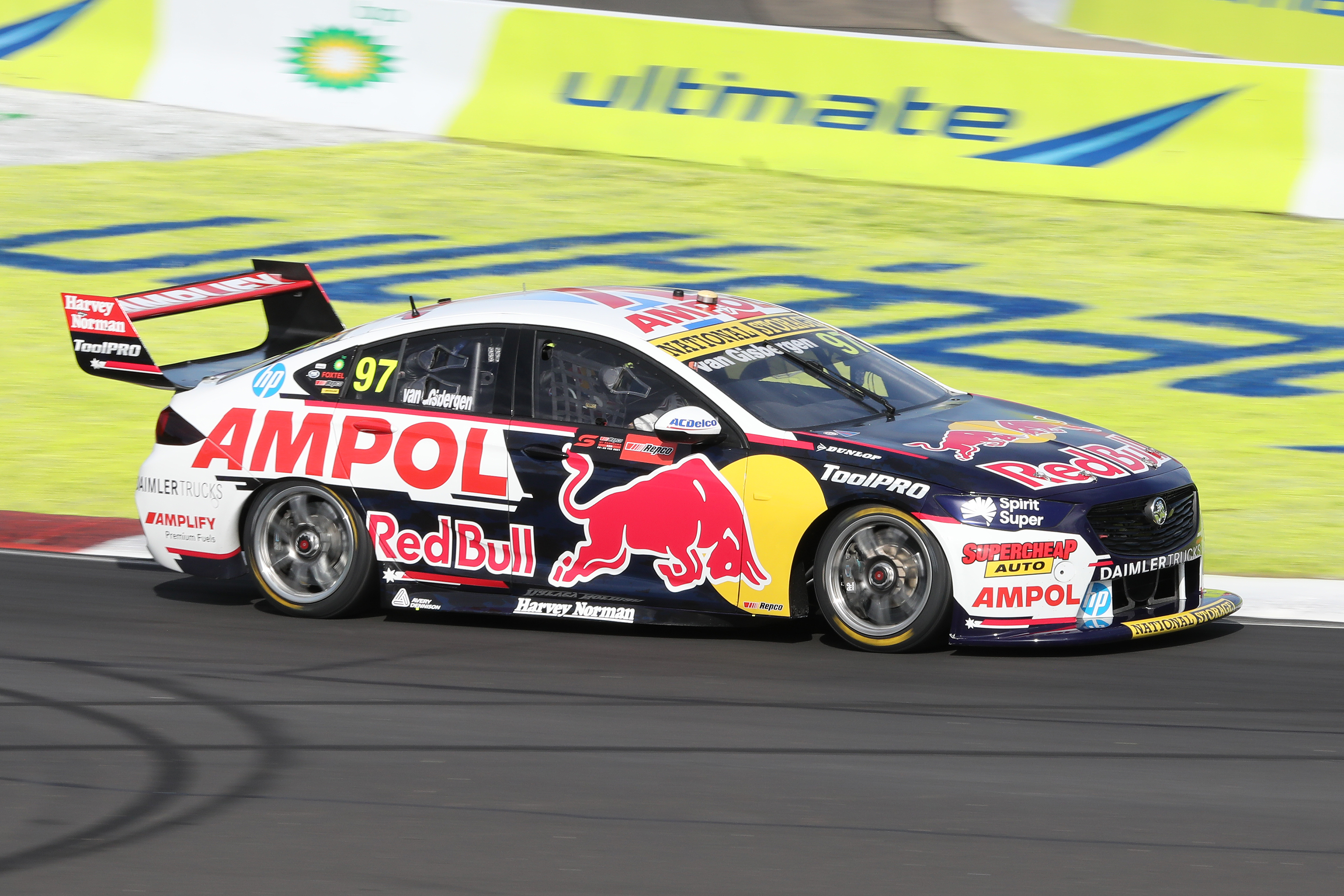
Van Gisbergen during practice at the 2021 Mount Panorama 500

In 2022, Van Gisbergen won the Bathurst 1000 with Garth Tander in what would be the final race for Holden after the manufacturer was closed by GM. He won his third Bathurst 1000 with Richie Stanaway a year later, driving for Triple Eight Race Engineering.

== GT racing ==
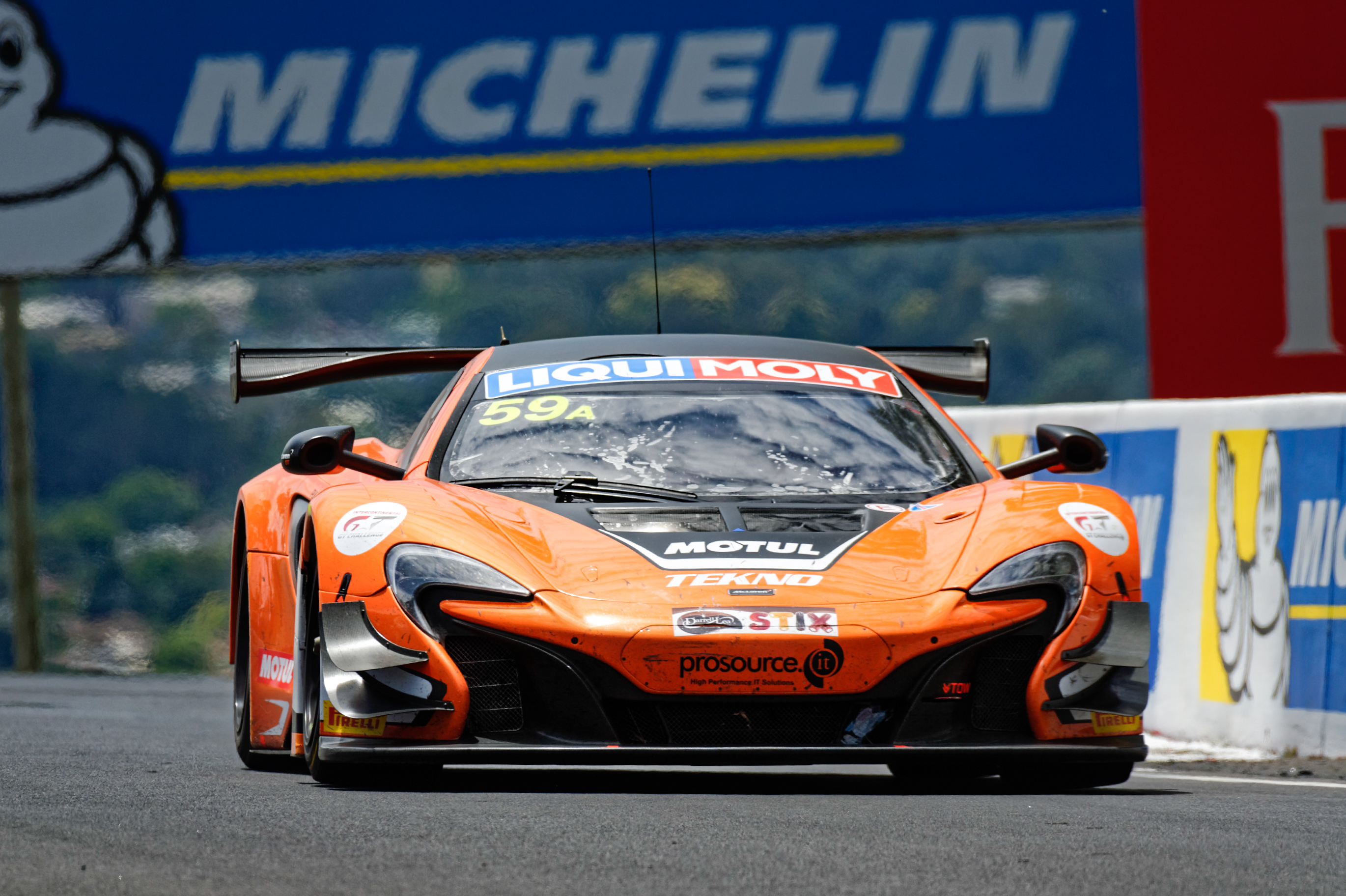
Van Gisbergen recorded the first win for McLaren at the Bathurst 12 Hour.

Through his connections with Tekno Autosports sponsor Tony Quinn, Van Gisbergen's first foray into GT racing was a guest co-drive in Quinn's team.

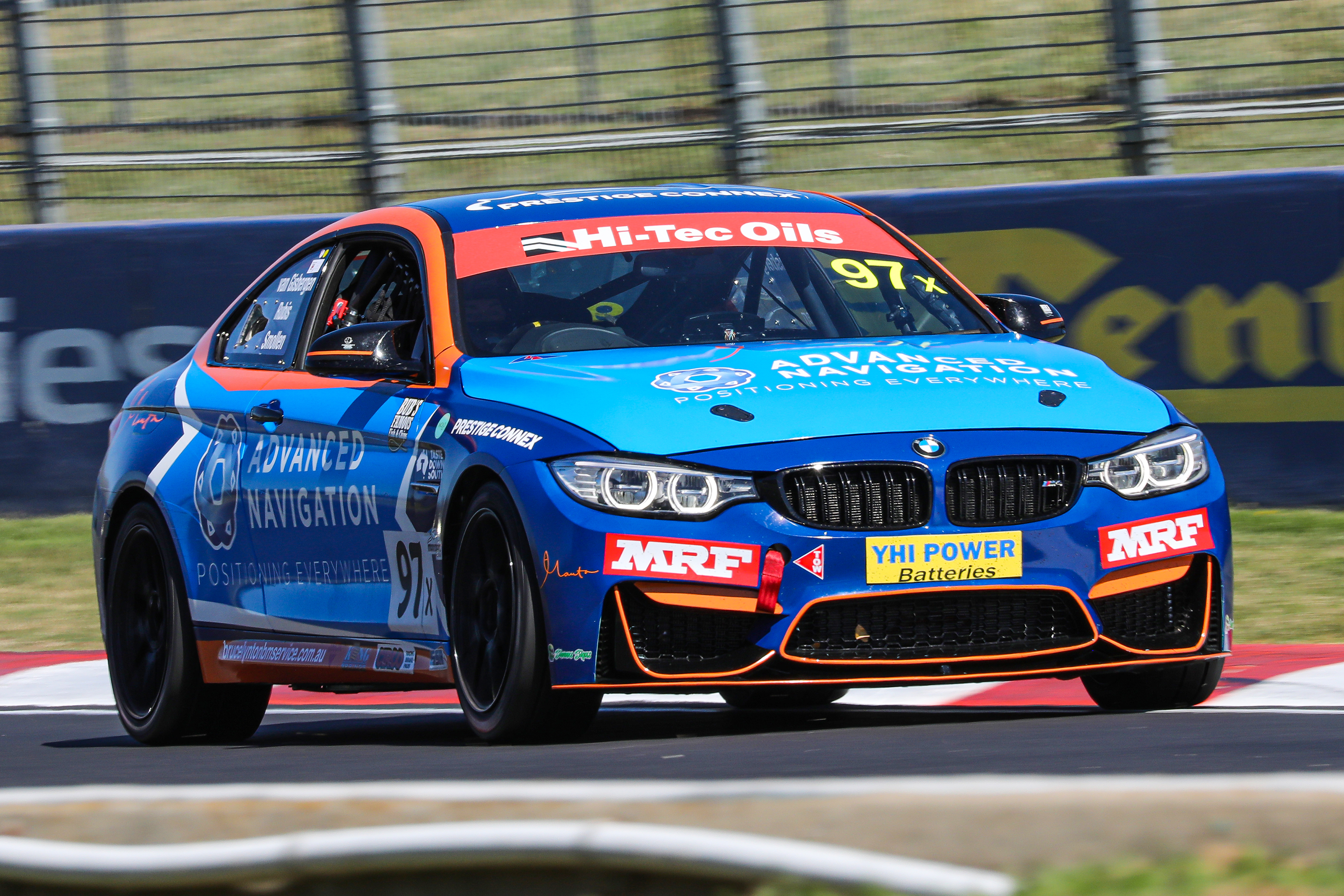
The BMW M4 F82 of Shane Smollen, Rob Rubis and Shane van Gisbergen at the 2021 Bathurst 6 Hour

In 2015, Van Gisbergen entered the Blancpain Endurance Series in a McLaren 650S GT3 run by Von Ryan Racing. Racing in conjunction with his V8 Supercars commitments, he was forced to miss one round due to a date clash; however achieved two victories in the four races he entered. The team was dissolved after the 2015 season, and for the 2016 season, Van Gisbergen moved to McLaren's new Garage 59 team. He would once again miss the final round of the championship at the Nürburgring in Germany due to the Sandown 500 V8 Supercar race being held on the same weekend. Van Gisbergen won the 2016 season with Côme Ledogar and Rob Bell having won the 3 Hours of Monza and the 1000 km Paul Ricard despite skipping the last round at the Nürburgring due to a clash with his Supercars Championship commitments.

Through his McLaren and Tekno Autosports connections, he drove one of Tekno's factory-supported McLaren 650S GT3s at the 2016 Bathurst 12 Hour. In qualifying on Saturday, Van Gisbergen set the fastest ever officially recorded lap of the Mount Panorama Circuit to achieve pole position. He went on to set the fastest ever race lap on the way to securing victory alongside Álvaro Parente and Jonathon Webb.

== NASCAR ==
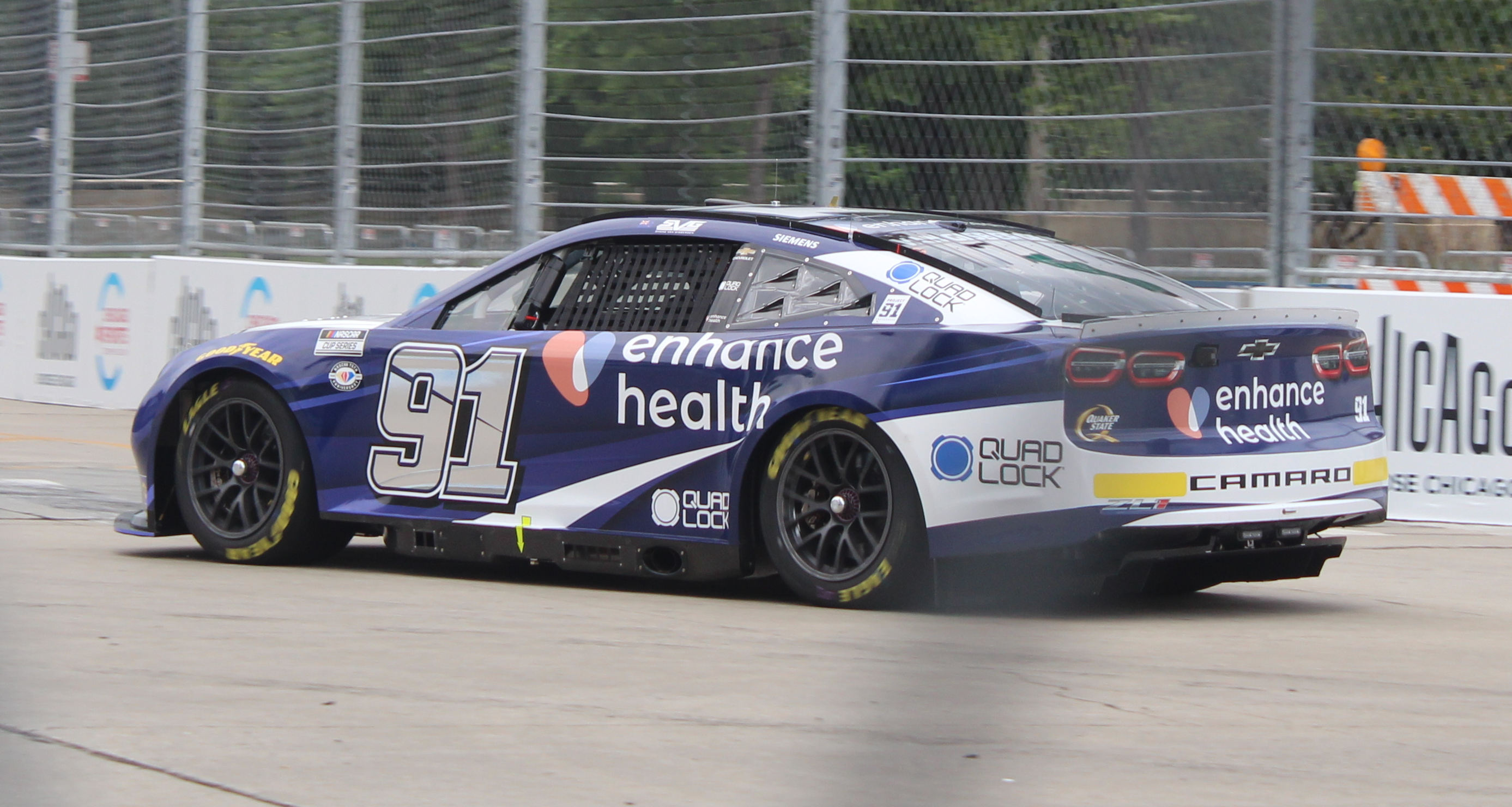
Van Gisbergen's race-winning car at the 2023 Grant Park 220

=== 2023: Project 91 and first win ===
In July 2023, Van Gisbergen made his debut in the NASCAR Cup Series, driving the No. 91 Chevrolet for Trackhouse Racing and its Project 91 programme at the inaugural 2023 Grant Park 220 at the Chicago Street Course. During qualifying for the race, he earned the third spot in the starting grid. Van Gisbergen was shuffled back to midpack after a pileup the lap before the completion of the second stage. Van Gisbergen took the lead on lap 71 from Justin Haley, and maintained it until Bubba Wallace collided with Ricky Stenhouse Jr. on Lap 73 and sent the race into NASCAR Overtime. Van Gisbergen won the race, becoming the seventh driver and the first driver in the modern era of NASCAR, and the first driver since Indy car driver Johnny Rutherford 60 years prior in 1963, to win in his Cup Series debut race, and also becoming the first New Zealander to win in the Cup Series, and only the sixth driver born outside the US to win a Cup Series race. He was also the first "road course ringer" to win a Cup Series race since Indy car driver Mark Donohue in 1973. Until his second career start, Van Gisbergen was also one of only two drivers to have a perfect winning record in NASCAR, briefly joining Marvin Burke in that accomplishment. He made his second start of the 2023 season at the Indianapolis Motor Speedway road course in August, scoring his second top-ten finish in the one-caution race, the first to start a NASCAR Cup career with two top-tens in their first two starts since Terry Labonte in 1978.

On 11 August 2023, Van Gisbergen made both his NASCAR Craftsman Truck Series and NASCAR oval debut, racing in the 2023 TSport 200 at Lucas Oil Indianapolis Raceway Park on 11 August, driving the No. 41 for Niece Motorsports. He qualified 28th and finished nineteenth. In September, Trackhouse announced that Van Gisbergen would drive part-time in all three of NASCAR's national series in 2024 as part of a development deal with the team.

=== 2024: Full-time in Xfinity ===
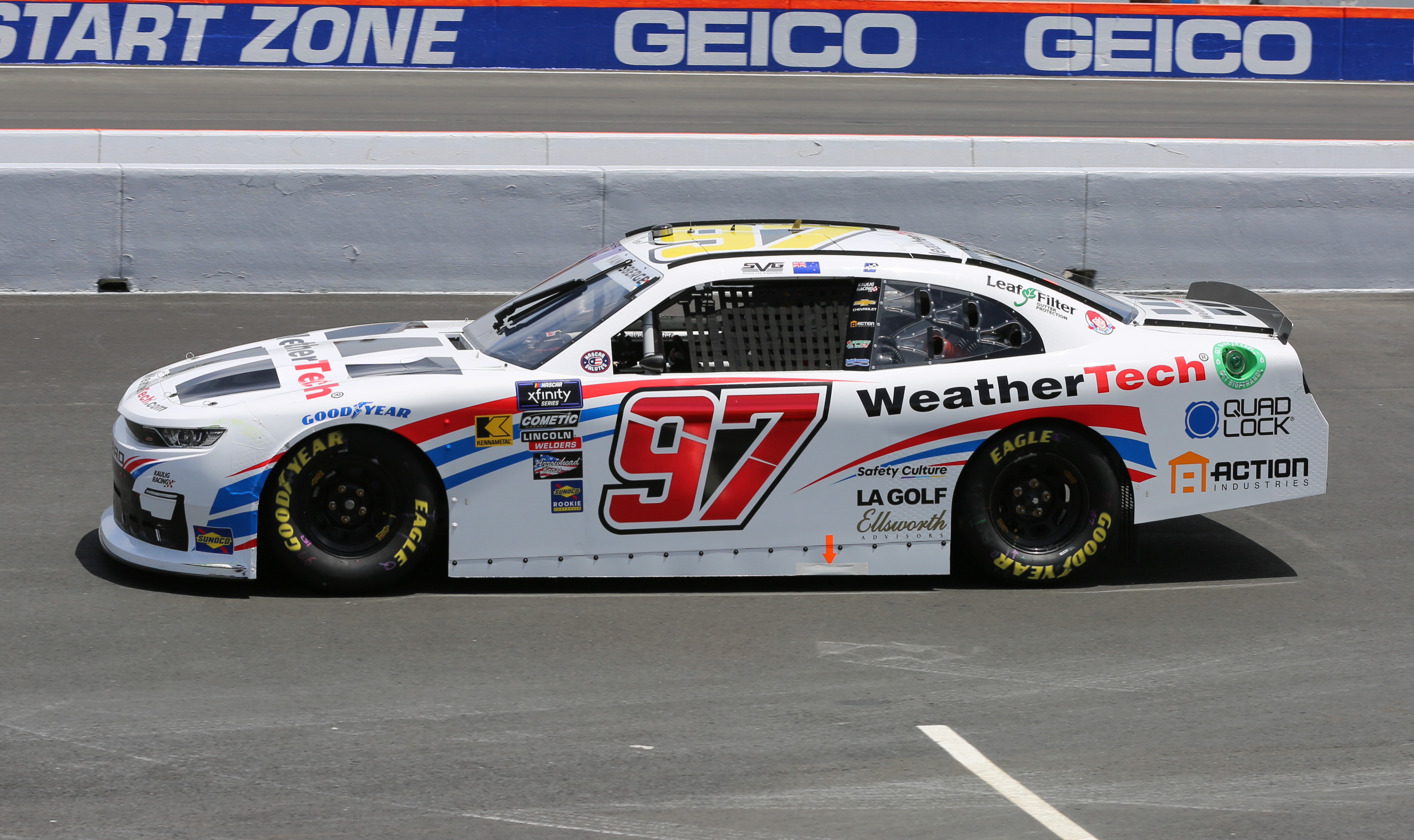
Van Gisbergen's race-winning car at the 2024 Zip Buy Now, Pay Later 250

Van Gisbergen celebrating his win at the 2024 Zip Buy Now, Pay Later 250 by kicking a rugby ball into the grandstands at Sonoma Raceway.

On 13 December 2023, Kaulig Racing announced that Van Gisbergen would compete full-time in the NASCAR Xfinity Series (now known as the NASCAR O'Reilly Auto Parts Series), driving the No. 97 car. Van Gisbergen also had to run the ARCA race at Daytona in order to receive approval to compete at superspeedway events in NASCAR, in which he competed for Pinnacle Racing Group. On 31 January, he signed with KHI Management. Van Gisbergen started the season with a twelfth place finish at Daytona. He scored his first two Xfinity Series wins on back-to-back weeks at Portland and Sonoma. After retiring at Iowa and scoring two top twenty finishes, he took his third victory of the season on his return to Chicago. Van Gisbergen was knocked out of the first round of the Xfinity Series playoffs.

Van Gisbergen also ran some select Cup Series races during the 2024 season, this time with Kaulig Racing driving the No. 13 for only one race and the No. 16 for the rest of the races. During the 2024 Watkins Glen race, Van Gisbergen led the field with one lap to go, looking for his second Cup win, however, Chris Buescher took the lead after the exit of the "Bus Stop", he ultimately finished second after two failed overtake attempts prevented him from taking the lead. In his only race in the No. 13 at the Charlotte Roval, Van Gisbergen would score his first career Cup Series pole while also leading 21 laps and finishing in seventh place. Van Gisbergen ran twelve Cup Series races that year, scoring one top five and two top tens along with one pole with an average finish of 22.8.

=== 2025: More wins and playoff debut ===
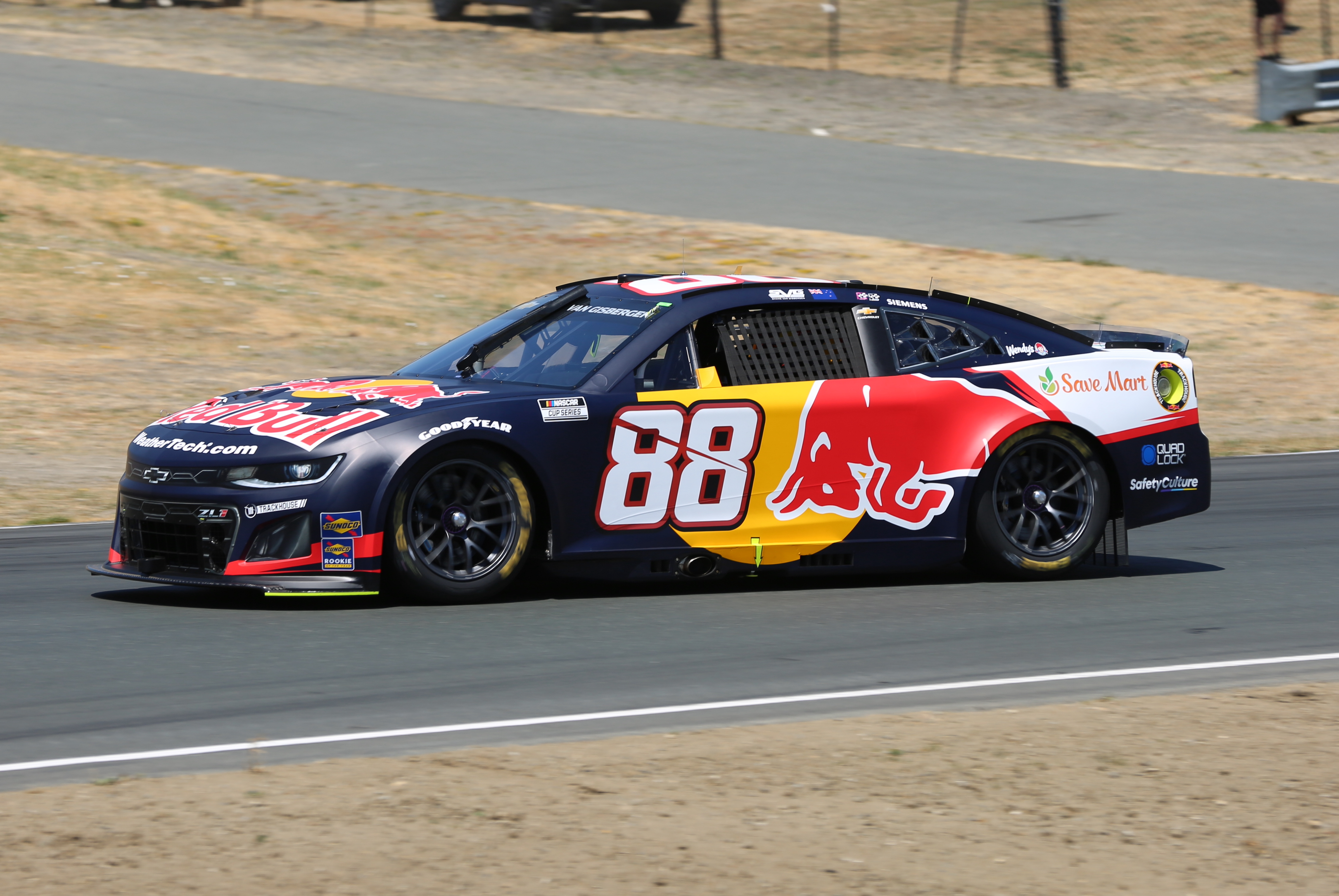
Van Gisbergen's race-winning car at the 2025 Toyota/Save Mart 350

Van Gisbergen drove full-time in the Cup Series for Trackhouse Racing, driving the No. 88 Chevrolet, in the 2025 series. Van Gisbergen started the 2025 season with a 33rd-place finish at the Daytona 500. He struggled throughout the regular season, scoring only one top-ten finish on the first 15 races. Despite his setbacks, Van Gisbergen scored a win and a playoff spot at Mexico City, winning by sixteen seconds. Three weeks later, he continued his dominance on road courses by winning again at Chicago, becoming the winningest non-American driver in the Cup Series. Additionally, he became the second driver to sweep the Xfinity and Cup races in a single weekend from the pole, joining Kyle Busch at Indianapolis in 2016. The following week, he won at Sonoma, after sweeping the poles for both the Xfinity and Cup races. His third win of the season tied Van Gisbergen with Tony Stewart and Jimmie Johnson (1999 and 2002, respectively) for most wins in a rookie season in the Cup Series. One-month later, he earned his fourth win by winning at Watkins Glen, making him the winningest-rookie Cup Series driver in a single-season. This win also made up for his last-lap pass the previous year. Van Gisbergen was eliminated following the Bristol playoff race. Despite his elimination, he scored his fifth consecutive road course win at the Charlotte Roval.

Van Gisbergen also drove part-time in the Xfinity Series in the No. 9 for JR Motorsports during the year. In his first start for the team, he won at the Chicago street course after holding off teammate Connor Zilisch. The following week at Sonoma, he battled for the second straight week with Zilisch, earning a second-place finish in the end. At Watkins Glen, with 14 laps to go, Zilisch would make contact with Van Gisbergen, sending him out of the race.

=== 2026 ===
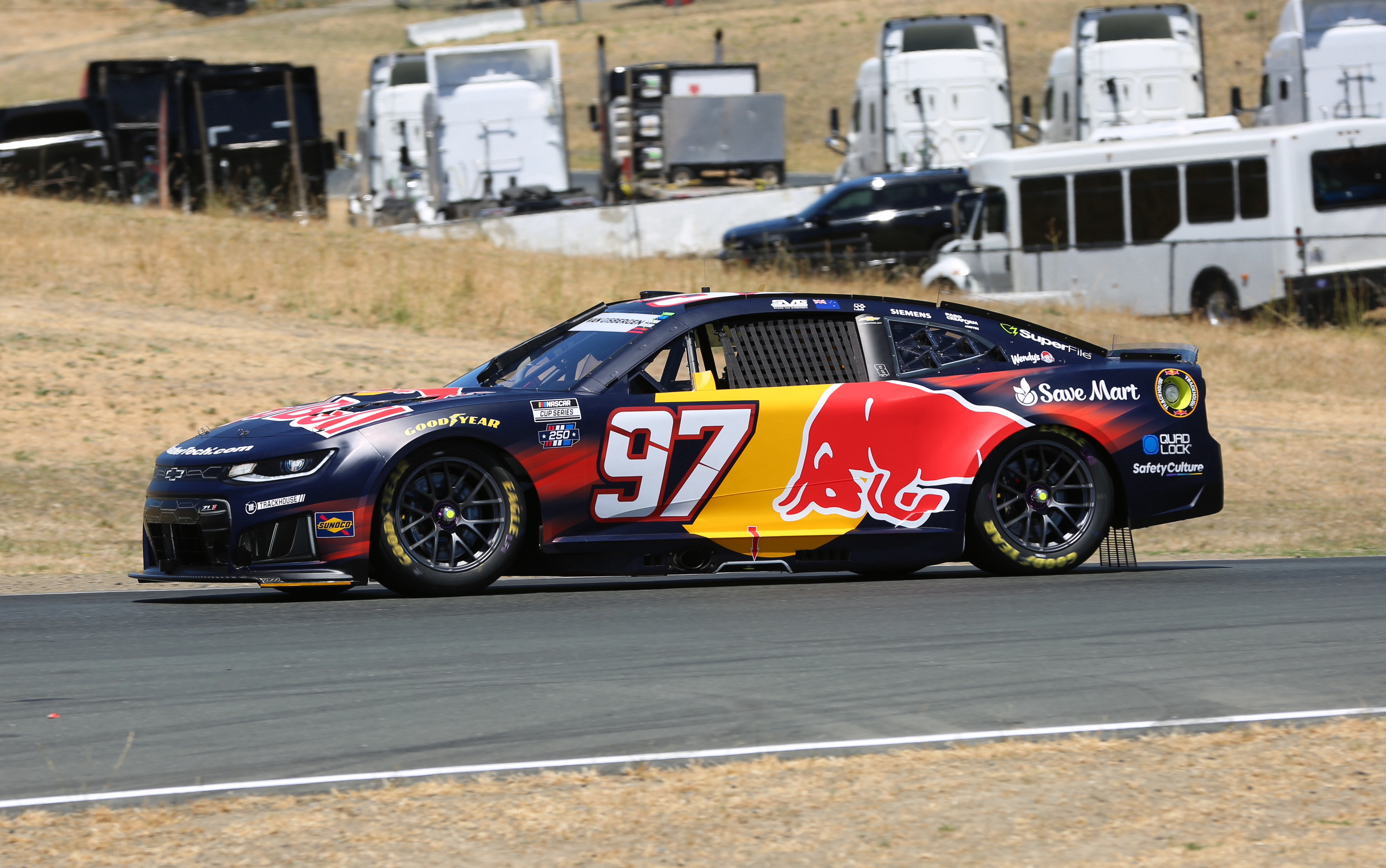
Van Gisbergen's race-winning car at the 2026 Toyota/Save Mart 350

Van Gisbergen would run the No. 97 for his second full-time Cup Series in the 2026 season. He started with a 30th place finish at the 2026 Daytona 500. The next week, he scored a top-ten at Atlanta I. He scored his first win of the season at Watkins Glen. He scored a top-five at Nashville, finishing fifth. He also won at Sonoma. He had two straight top-ten finishes at Atlanta II and North Wilkesboro, finishing sixth and fifth respectively.

Van Gisbergen again competed in select races in the No. 9 for JR Motorsports for a second consecutive season in the O'Reilly Auto Parts Series. In his first start of the season for the team, Van Gisbergen would earn victory at Austin. He also won at Sonoma, becoming the winningest international born driver in O'Reilly Series history.

Van Gisbergen also made his return to the Truck Series in 2026, driving the No. 4 for Niece Motorsports at Watkins Glen. He finished third in the race, behind Connor Zilisch. On May 14, it was announced that Van Gisbergen would drive the No. 71 for Spire Motorsports at Charlotte. He scored a top-five with Spire at North Wilkesboro, finishing third.

== Personal life ==
In 2025, Van Gisbergen married Jessica Dane, current program manager at Corvette Racing. She and her father Roland Dane were co-owners at Triple Eight Race Engineering.

== Motorsports career results ==
Season	Series	Position	Car	Team
2004–05	New Zealand Formula First Championship	**3rd**		
2005–06	New Zealand Formula Ford Championship	**1st**	Stealth Evo 2	
2006–07	Toyota Racing Series	**2nd**	Tatuus TT104ZZ Toyota	International Motorsport
2007	V8 Supercar Championship Series	43rd	Ford BF Falcon	Team Kiwi Racing
2008	V8 Supercar Championship Series	15th	Ford BF Falcon	Stone Brothers Racing
2009	V8 Supercar Championship Series	12th	Ford FG Falcon	Stone Brothers Racing
2010	V8 Supercar Championship Series	6th	Ford FG Falcon	Stone Brothers Racing
2011	International V8 Supercars Championship	4th	Ford FG Falcon	Stone Brothers Racing
2012	International V8 Supercars Championship	6th	Ford FG Falcon	Stone Brothers Racing
2013	International V8 Supercars Championship	5th	Holden VF Commodore	Tekno Autosports
2013	V8SuperTourer	**3rd**	Ford FG Falcon	MPC Motorsport
2013	Australian GT Championship	16th	Porsche 997 GT3 R	VIP Petfoods Racing
2014	International V8 Supercars Championship	**2nd**	Holden VF Commodore	Tekno Autosports
2014	United SportsCar Championship – GTD	67th	Porsche 911 GT America	Alex Job Racing
2015	International V8 Supercars Championship	4th	Holden VF Commodore	Tekno Autosports
2015	Blancpain GT Series Endurance Cup	4th	McLaren 650S GT3	Von Ryan Racing
2015	Australian GT Championship	21st	McLaren 650S GT3	Keltic Racing
2015	United SportsCar Championship – GTD	31st	Porsche 911 GT America	Alex Job Racing
2016	International V8 Supercars Championship	**1st**	Holden VF Commodore	Triple Eight Race Engineering
2016	Blancpain GT Series Endurance Cup	**1st**	McLaren 650S GT3	Garage 59
2016	Intercontinental GT Challenge	**3rd**	McLaren 650S GT3	Tekno Autosports; Garage 59; K-PAX Racing
2016	WeatherTech SportsCar Championship – GTD	54th	Porsche GT3 R	Alex Job Racing
2017	Virgin Australia Supercars Championship	4th	Holden VF Commodore	Triple Eight Race Engineering
2018	Virgin Australia Supercars Championship	**2nd**	Holden ZB Commodore	Triple Eight Race Engineering
2019	Virgin Australia Supercars Championship	**2nd**	Holden ZB Commodore	Triple Eight Race Engineering
2019–20	Asian Le Mans Series – LMP2	12th	Ligier JS P217	Eurasia Motorsport
2020	Virgin Australia Supercars Championship	**3rd**	Holden ZB Commodore	Triple Eight Race Engineering
2021	Repco Supercars Championship	**1st**	Holden ZB Commodore	Triple Eight Race Engineering
2021	Bathurst 6 Hour	**1st**	BMW M4	Bruce Lynton BMW
2021	Toyota Racing Series	7th	Tatuus FT-60	M2 Competition
2022	Repco Supercars Championship	**1st**	Holden ZB Commodore	Triple Eight Race Engineering
2022	24 Hours of Le Mans – GTE Pro	5th	Ferrari 488 GTE Evo	Riley Motorsports
2022	World Rally Championship-2	33rd	Škoda Fabia R5	Race Torque Engineering
2023	Repco Supercars Championship	**2nd**	Chevrolet Camaro ZL1	Triple Eight Race Engineering
2023	NASCAR Cup Series	42nd	Chevrolet Camaro ZL1	Trackhouse Racing
2023	NASCAR Craftsman Truck Series	63rd	Chevrolet Silverado RST	Niece Motorsports
2024	NASCAR Cup Series	45th	Chevrolet Camaro ZL1	Kaulig Racing
2024	NASCAR Xfinity Series	12th	Chevrolet Camaro SS	Kaulig Racing
2024	ARCA Menards Series	109th	Chevrolet SS	Pinnacle Racing Group
2025	NASCAR Cup Series	12th	Chevrolet Camaro ZL1	Trackhouse Racing
2025	NASCAR Xfinity Series	79th	Chevrolet Camaro SS	JR Motorsports
2026	NASCAR Cup Series	17th	Chevrolet Camaro ZL1	Trackhouse Racing
2026	NASCAR O'Reilly Auto Parts Series	68th	Chevrolet Camaro SS	JR Motorsports
2026	NASCAR Craftsman Truck Series	100th	Chevrolet Silverado RST	Niece Motorsports; Spire Motorsports
2026	CARS Late Model Stock Car Tour	61st	Chevrolet Camaro	Hettinger Racing

=== Complete Toyota Racing Series results ===
Year	Entrant	1	2	3	4	5	6	7	8	9	10	11	12	13	14	15	16	17	18	19	Pos.	Pts
2006–07	International Motorsport	PUK1; 1; 5	PUK1; 2; 11	PUK1; 3; 2	RUA; 1 DNS	RUA; 2; 9	**TAU**; **1**; 5	TAU; 2; 3	TAU; 3; 2	**MAN**; **1**; 1	MAN; 2; 5	MAN; 3; 2	TIM; 1; 2	TIM; 2; 2	TIM; 3; 3	TER; 1; 4	TER; 2; 4	TER; 3; 12	**PUK2**; **1**; 14	PUK2; 2; 1	2nd	1120
2021	M2 Competition	HD1; 1; 1	**HD1**; **2**; 1	HD1; 3; 1	HD2; 1	HD2; 2	MAN; 1	MAN; 2	MAN; 3	MAN; 4											7th	105

=== Complete New Zealand Grand Prix results ===
Year	Team	Car	Qualifying	Main race
2007	(New Zealand) International Motorsport	Tatuus TT104ZZ – Toyota	5th	12th
2021	(New Zealand) M2 Competition	Tatuus FT-60 – Toyota	10th	**1st**

=== Touring Cars ===
==== Supercars Championship results ====
(Races in bold indicate pole position) (Races in italics indicate fastest lap)

Supercars results
Year	Team	No.	Car	1	2	3	4	5	6	7	8	9	10	11	12	13	14	15	16	17	18	19	20	21	22	23	24	25	26	27	28	29	30	31	32	33	34	35	36	37	38	39	Position	Points
2007	Team Kiwi Racing	021	Ford BF Falcon	ADE; R1	ADE; R2	BAR; R3	BAR; R4	BAR; R5	PUK; R6	PUK; R7	PUK; R8	WIN; R9	WIN; R10	WIN; R11	EAS; R12	EAS; R13	EAS; R14	HDV; R15	HDV; R16	HDV; R17	QLD; R18	QLD; R19	QLD; R20	ORA; R21; 20	ORA; R22; 13	ORA; R23; 23	SAN; R24; 20	BAT; R25; Ret	SUR; R26; 22	SUR; R27; 12	SUR; R28; Ret	BHR; R29; 15	BHR; R30; 16	BHR; R31; 13	SYM; R32; 24	SYM; R33; 15	SYM; R34; 18	PHI; R35; 14	PHI; R36; 14	PHI; R37; 17			43rd	23
2008	Stone Brothers Racing	9	Ford BF Falcon	ADE; R1; 12	ADE; R2; 5	EAS; R3; 17	EAS; R4; 27	EAS; R5; 17	HAM; R6; 21	HAM; R7; 26	HAM; R8; 10	BAR; R9; Ret	BAR; R10; 10	BAR; R11; 12	SAN; R12; 9	SAN; R13; 2	**SAN**; **R14**; **4**	HDV; R15; 12	HDV; R16; 15	HDV; R17; 9	QLD; R18; 17	QLD; R19; 21	QLD; R20; 17	WIN; R21; 14	WIN; R22; 22	WIN; R23; 12	PHI; QR; 5	PHI; R24; 10	BAT; R25; Ret	SUR; R26; 17	SUR; R27; 13	SUR; R28; Ret	BHR; R29; 7	BHR; R30; 26	BHR; R31; 10	SYM; R32; 5	SYM; R33; Ret	SYM; R34; DSQ	ORA; R35; Ret	ORA; R36; 13	ORA; R37; 5		15th	1614
2009	Stone Brothers Racing	9	**Ford FG** **Falcon**	ADE; R1; 6	ADE; R2; 13	HAM; R3; 17	HAM; R4; 15	WIN; R5; 6	WIN; R6; 12	SYM; R7; 6	SYM; R8; 20	HDV; R9; 20	HDV; R10; 9	TOW; R11; 12	TOW; R12; Ret	SAN; R13; 15	SAN; R14; Ret	QLD; R15; 9	QLD; R16; 12	PHI; QR; 4	PHI; R17; 10	BAT; R18; 13	SUR; R19; 5	SUR; R20; 7	SUR; R21; 19	SUR; R22; 11	PHI; R23; 5	PHI; R24; 6	BAR; R25; 15	BAR; R26; 13	SYD; R27; 10	SYD; R28; 6											12th	1970
2010	Stone Brothers Racing	9	**Ford FG** **Falcon**	YMC; R1; 6	YMC; R2; 3	BHR; R3; 5	BHR; R4; 3	ADE; R5; 22	ADE; R6; 4	HAM; R7; Ret	HAM; R8; 7	QLD; R9; 3	QLD; R10; 3	WIN; R11; 5	WIN; R12; 12	HDV; R13; 3	HDV; R14; 3	TOW; R15; 8	TOW; R16; 7	PHI; QR; 3	PHI; R17; 27	BAT; R18; 9	SUR; R19; 3	SUR; R20; 2	SYM; R21; 13	SYM; R22; 11	SAN; R23; 9	SAN; R24; Ret	SYD; R25; Ret	SYD; R26; 3													6th	2391
2011	Stone Brothers Racing	9	**Ford FG** **Falcon**	YMC; R1; 4	YMC; R2; 8	ADE; R3; 13	ADE; R4; 18	HAM; R5; 16	HAM; R6; 1	BAR; R7; 4	BAR; R8; 10	BAR; R9; 7	WIN; R10; 14	WIN; R11; 4	HID; R12; 7	HID; R13; 1	TOW; R14; 11	TOW; R15; 5	QLD; R16; 11	QLD; R17; 8	QLD; R18; 3	PHI; QR; 1	PHI; R19; 5	BAT; R20; 6	SUR; R21; 16	SUR; R22; 16	SYM; R23; 7	SYM; R24; 7	SAN; R25; 5	SAN; R26; 6	SYD; R27; 3	SYD; R28; 3											4th	2672
2012	Stone Brothers Racing	9	**Ford FG** **Falcon**	ADE; R1; 11	ADE; R2; 6	SYM; R3; 4	SYM; R4; 2	HAM; R5; 22	HAM; R6; 10	BAR; R7; 7	BAR; R8; 11	BAR; R9; 18	PHI; R10; 2	PHI; R11; 4	HID; R12; 7	HID; R13; 7	TOW; R14; 22	TOW; R15; 7	QLD; R16; 7	QLD; R17; 7	SMP; R18; 7	SMP; R19; 13	**SAN**; **QR**; **1**	**SAN**; **R20**; **5**	BAT; R21; 12	SUR; R22; 10	SUR; R23; 9	YMC; R24; 3	YMC; R25; 3	YMC; R26; 4	WIN; R27; Ret	WIN; R28; 4	SYD; R29; Ret	SYD; R30; Ret									6th	2554
2013	Tekno Autosports	97	Holden VF Commodore	**ADE**; **R1**; **Ret**	**ADE**; **R2**; **1**	SYM; R3; 7	SYM; R4; 12	SYM; R5; 9	PUK; R6; 4	PUK; R7; 6	PUK; R8; 2	PUK; R9; 11	BAR; R10; 9	BAR; R11; 7	BAR; R12; 6	COA; R13; 26	COA; R14; 5	COA; R15; 5	COA; R16; 3	HID; R17; 2	HID; R18; 8	HID; R19; 6	**TOW**; **R20**; **17**	TOW; R21; 3	QLD; R22; 12	QLD; R23; 17	QLD; R24; 11	WIN; R25; 13	WIN; R26; 5	WIN; R27; 5	SAN; QR; 14	SAN; R28; 12	BAT; R29; 11	SUR; R30; 2	SUR; R31; Ret	PHI; R32; 7	PHI; R33; 3	PHI; R34; 10	SYD; R35; 3	**SYD**; **R36**; **1**			5th	2508
2014	Tekno Autosports	97	Holden VF Commodore	ADE; R1; 3	ADE; R2; 16	**ADE**; **R3**; **3**	SYM; R4; 11	SYM; R5; 11	SYM; R6; 7	WIN; R7; 2	WIN; R8; 20	WIN; R9; 12	PUK; R10; 2	PUK; R11; 5	PUK; R12; 1	PUK; R13; 4	BAR; R14; 25	BAR; R15; 19	BAR; R16; 20	HID; R17; 3	HID; R18; 7	HID; R19; 2	TOW; R20; 5	TOW; R21; 4	TOW; R22; 3	QLD; R23; 10	QLD; R24; 4	QLD; R25; 10	SMP; R26; 1	SMP; R27; 1	SMP; R28; 7	SAN; QR; 2	SAN; R29; 6	**BAT**; **R30**; **16**	**SUR**; **R31**; **1**	SUR; R32; 5	PHI; R33; 24	PHI; R34; 17	PHI; R35; 5	SYD; R36; 6	SYD; R37; 2	SYD; R38; 1	2nd	2781
2015	Tekno Autosports	97	Holden VF Commodore	ADE; R1; 6	ADE; R2; 13	ADE; R3; 2	SYM; R4; 4	SYM; R5; 8	SYM; R6; 3	BAR; R7; 4	BAR; R8; 24	BAR; R9; 14	WIN; R10; 8	WIN; R11; 5	WIN; R12; 23	HID; R13; 12	HID; R14; 5	HID; R15; 4	TOW; R16; 10	TOW; R17; 20	QLD; R18; 4	QLD; R19; Ret	QLD; R20; 21	SMP; R21; 20	SMP; R22; 5	SMP; R23; 4	SAN; QR; 4	SAN; R24; 3	BAT; R25; 8	**SUR**; **R26**; **1**	SUR; R27; 5	PUK; R28; 2	PUK; R29; 5	PUK; R30; 9	PHI; R31; 4	PHI; R32; 9	PHI; R33; 7	SYD; R34; 2	SYD; R35; 6	SYD; R36; 1			4th	2712
2016	Triple Eight Race Engineering	97	Holden VF Commodore	ADE; R1; 3	ADE; R2; 5	ADE; R3; 10	SYM; R4; 1	SYM; R5; Ret	PHI; R6; 4	PHI; R7; 10	BAR; R8; 2	BAR; R9; 4	WIN; R10; 9	WIN; R11; 4	**HID**; **R12**; **16**	**HID**; **R13**; **1**	TOW; R14; 2	TOW; R15; 1	QLD; R16; 1	QLD; R17; 12	SMP; R18; 1	SMP; R19; 5	SAN; QR; 9	SAN; R20; 2	BAT; R21; 2	**SUR**; **R22**; **1**	SUR; R23; 2	**PUK**; **R24**; **2**	**PUK**; **R25**; **1**	**PUK**; **R26**; **3**	PUK; R27; 2	**SYD**; **R28**; **3**	SYD; R29; 1										1st	3368
2017	Triple Eight Race Engineering	97	Holden VF Commodore	**ADE**; **R1**; **1**	**ADE**; **R2**; **1**	SYM; R3; 1	SYM; R4; 9	PHI; R5; 4	PHI; R6; 16	BAR; R7; 4	BAR; R8; 6	WIN; R9; 8	WIN; R10; 1	HID; R11; Ret	HID; R12; 3	TOW; R13; 7	TOW; R14; 3	QLD; R15; 3	QLD; R16; 3	SMP; R17; 23	SMP; R18; 3	SAN; QR; 19	SAN; R19; 15	BAT; R20; 5	SUR; R21; 4	**SUR**; **R22**; **3**	PUK; R23; 1	PUK; R24; 24	NEW; R25; 16	NEW; R26; 2													4th	2769
2018	Triple Eight Race Engineering	97	Holden ZB Commodore	**ADE**; **R1**; **1**	**ADE**; **R2**; **1**	MEL; R3; 4	MEL; R4; 4	MEL; R5; 13	MEL; R6; 13	**SYM**; **R7**; **6**	SYM; R8; 25	PHI; R9; 3	PHI; R10; 6	BAR; R11; 3	**BAR**; **R12**; **5**	WIN; R13; 3	WIN; R14; 2	HID; R15; 2	HID; R16; 4	TOW; R17; 2	TOW; R18; 1	QLD; R19; 2	QLD; R20; 1	SMP; R21; 1	BEN; R22; 1	BEN; R23; 2	SAN; QR; 11	SAN; R24; 2	BAT; R25; 5	SUR; R26; 10	SUR; R27; C	PUK; R28; 1	PUK; R29; 2	**NEW**; **R30**; **5**	NEW; R31; 4								2nd	3873
2019	Triple Eight Race Engineering	97	Holden ZB Commodore	ADE; R1; 3	ADE; R2; 3	MEL; R3; Ret	MEL; R4; 10	MEL; R5; 21	MEL; R6; 22	SYM; R7; 3	**SYM**; **R8**; 1	PHI; R9; 6	PHI; R10; 7	BAR; R11; 5	BAR; R12; 5	WIN; R13; 5	WIN; R14; 7	HID; R15; 8	HID; R16; 10	TOW; R17; 4	TOW; R18; 1	QLD; R19; 5	QLD; R20; 2	BEN; R21; 6	BEN; R22; 6	**PUK**; **R23**; 1	PUK; R24; 2	BAT; R25; 2	SUR; R26; 2	**SUR**; **R27**; 1	SAN; QR; Ret	SAN; R28; 17	**NEW**; **R29**; 1	NEW; R30; 7									2nd	3310
2020	Triple Eight Race Engineering	97	Holden ZB Commodore	ADE; R1; 3	**ADE**; **R2**; Ret	**MEL**; **R3**; C	MEL; R4; C	MEL; R5; C	MEL; R6; C	SMP1; R7; 2	SMP1; R8; 7	SMP1; R9; 6	SMP2; R10; 4	SMP2; R11; 8	SMP2; R12; 12	HID1; R13; 11	HID1; R14; 4	HID1; R15; 3	HID2; R16; 8	HID2; R17; 2	**HID2**; **R18**; 5	TOW1; R19; 19	TOW1; R20; 3	TOW1; R21; 8	TOW2; R22; Ret	TOW2; R23; 1	TOW2; R24; 1	BEN1; R25; 9	BEN1; R26; 1	BEN1; R27; 14	BEN2; R28; 2	BEN2; R29; 5	BEN2; R30; 5	BAT; R31; 1									3rd	2095
2021	Triple Eight Race Engineering	97	Holden ZB Commodore	BAT1; R1; 1	**BAT1**; **R2**; 1	SAN; R3; 1	**SAN**; **R4**; 1	**SAN**; **R5**; 1	**SYM**; **R6**; 1	SYM; R7; 2	SYM; R8; 6	BEN; R9; 7	BEN; R10; 3	BEN; R11; 2	HID; R12; 13	HID; R13; 1	HID; R14; 1	**TOW1**; **R15**; 1	TOW1; R16; 1	TOW2; R17; 6	TOW2; R18; 1	TOW2; R19; 2	SMP1; R20; 2	SMP1; R21; 1	SMP1; R22; 4	SMP2; R23; 1	SMP2; R24; 2	**SMP2**; **R25**; 23	SMP3; R26; 2	SMP3; R27; 3	SMP3; R28; 3	SMP4; R29; 1	SMP4; R30; C	BAT2; R31; 18									1st	2930
2022	Triple Eight Race Engineering	97	Holden ZB Commodore	SMP; R1; 1	SMP; R2; 6	SYM; R3; 1	**SYM**; **R4**; 1	SYM; R5; 1	MEL; R6; 3	MEL; R7; 1	MEL; R8; 1	MEL; R9; 20	BAR; R10; 1	BAR; R11; 5	**BAR**; **R12**; 1	**WIN**; **R13**; 2	WIN; R14; 1	WIN; R15; 2	HID; R16; 3	HID; R17; 3	HID; R18; 21	**TOW**; **R19**; 1	TOW; R20; 1	BEN; R21; 1	BEN; R22; 1	BEN; R23; 1	SAN; R24; 2	**SAN**; **R25**; 1	SAN; R26; 1	PUK; R27; 5	**PUK**; **R28**; 1	PUK; R29; 1	BAT; R30; 1	SUR; R31; 1	**SUR**; **R32**; 1	ADE; R33; 20	ADE; R34; 7						1st	3523
2023	Triple Eight Race Engineering	97	Chevrolet Camaro ZL1	NEW; R1; DSQ	NEW; R2; 1	MEL; R3; 1	**MEL**; **R4**; **2**	MEL; R5; 2	MEL; R6; 4	**BAR**; **R7**; **1**	BAR; R8; 5	BAR; R9; 12	SYM; R10; 3	SYM; R11; Ret	SYM; R12; 4	HID; R13; 6	HID; R14; 2	HID; R15; 4	TOW; R16; 4	TOW; R17; 5	SMP; R18; 7	SMP; R19; 1	BEN; R20; 5	BEN; R21; 5	BEN; R22; 5	SAN; R23; 3	BAT; R24; 1	SUR; R25; 2	SUR; R26; 5	ADE; R27; Ret	ADE; R28; Ret												2nd	2565

==== Complete Bathurst 1000 results ====
Year	Team	Car	Co-driver	Position	Laps
2007	Team Kiwi Racing	Ford Falcon BF	(New Zealand) John McIntyre	DNF	148
2008	Stone Brothers Racing	Ford Falcon BF	(Australia) Jonathon Webb	DNF	91
2009	Stone Brothers Racing	Ford Falcon FG	(Australia) Alex Davison	13th	161
2010	Stone Brothers Racing	Ford Falcon FG	(New Zealand) John McIntyre	21st	158
2011	Stone Brothers Racing	Ford Falcon FG	(New Zealand) John McIntyre	6th	161
2012	Stone Brothers Racing	Ford Falcon FG	(Australia) Luke Youlden	12th	161
2013	Tekno Autosports	Holden Commodore VF	(Netherlands) Jeroen Bleekemolen	11th	161
2014	Tekno Autosports	Holden Commodore VF	(Australia) Jonathon Webb	16th	158
2015	Tekno Autosports	Holden Commodore VF	(Australia) Jonathon Webb	8th	161
2016	Triple Eight Race Engineering	Holden Commodore VF	(France) Alexandre Prémat	**2nd**	161
2017	Triple Eight Race Engineering	Holden Commodore VF	(Australia) Matthew Campbell	5th	161
2018	Triple Eight Race Engineering	Holden Commodore ZB	(New Zealand) Earl Bamber	5th	161
2019	Triple Eight Race Engineering	Holden Commodore ZB	(Australia) Garth Tander	**2nd**	161
2020	Triple Eight Race Engineering	Holden Commodore ZB	(Australia) Garth Tander	**1st**	161
2021	Triple Eight Race Engineering	Holden Commodore ZB	(Australia) Garth Tander	18th	161
2022	Triple Eight Race Engineering	Holden Commodore ZB	(Australia) Garth Tander	**1st**	161
2023	Triple Eight Race Engineering	Chevrolet Camaro Mk.6	(New Zealand) Richie Stanaway	**1st**	161

==== Complete V8 SuperTourer results ====
Year	Team	No.	Car	1	2	3	4	5	6	7	8	9	10	11	12	13	14	15	16	17	18	19	20	21	Pos.	Points
2013	MPC Motorsports	97	Ford FG Falcon	HAM1; R1; 8	HAM1; R2; 4	HAM1; R3; 2	RUA; R4; 15	RUA; R5; Ret	RUA; R6; 12	PUK1; R7; **1**	PUK1; R8; **1**	PUK1; R9; **2**	TAU; R10; 1	TAU; R11; 7	TAU; R12; 2	HAM2; R13; 5	HAM2; R14; 4	HAM2; R15; 4	HAM3; R16; 3	HAM3; R17; 12	HAM3; R18; 5	PUK2; R19; 1	PUK2; R20; Ret	PUK2; R21; DNS	**3rd**	**3066**
2014–15	Team 4	4	Holden VE Commodore	**TAU**; **R1**; 1	TAU; R2; 1	TAU; R3; 3	**HMP**; **R4**; 1	HMP; R5; 8	HMP; R6; 1	**PUK**; **R7**; 1	PUK; R8; 1	PUK; R9; 3	HMP; R10	HMP; R11	HMP; R12	PUK; R13	PUK; R14	PUK; R15							4th	1102

=== Sports/GT Cars ===
==== Complete Bathurst 12 Hour results ====
Year	Team	Co-drivers	Car	Class	Laps	Pos.	Class pos.
2013	VIP Petfoods Racing	(Australia) Matt Kingsley (Australia) Klark Quinn (United Kingdom) Tony Quinn	Porsche 997 GT3-R	A	267	**3rd**	**3rd**
2014	Darrell Lea	(United Kingdom) Andrew Kirkaldy (Australia) Klark Quinn (United Kingdom) Tony Quinn	McLaren MP4-12C GT3	A	296	4th	4th
2016	Tekno Autosports	(Portugal) Álvaro Parente (Australia) Jonathon Webb	McLaren 650S GT3	AP	297	**1st**	**1st**
2017	Scott Taylor Motorsports	(New Zealand) Craig Baird (Germany) Maro Engel	Mercedes AMG GT3	AA	283	DNF	DNF
2018	YNA Autosport	(France) Côme Ledogar (Australia) Craig Lowndes	McLaren 650S GT3	APP	119	DNF	DNF
2019	(Australia) Triple Eight Race Engineering	(Australia) Jamie Whincup (Australia) Craig Lowndes	Mercedes-AMG GT3	APP	312	4th	4th
2020	(Australia) Triple Eight Race Engineering	(Australia) Jamie Whincup (Germany) Maximilian Götz	Mercedes-AMG GT3 Evo	Pro	314	**3rd**	**3rd**
2022	(Australia) Triple Eight Race Engineering	(Australia) Broc Feeney (Malaysia) Jefri Ibrahim	Mercedes-AMG GT3 Evo	Pro-Am	291	**3rd**	**3rd**
2023	(Australia) Triple Eight Race Engineering	(Australia) Broc Feeney (Germany) Maximilian Götz	Mercedes-AMG GT3 Evo	Pro	322	5th	5th

==== Complete Blancpain GT Series Endurance Cup results ====
Year	Entrant	Class	Car	1	2	3	4	5	Rank	Points
2014	Von Ryan Racing	Pro Cup	McLaren MP4-12C GT3	MNZ	SIL	PAU	SPA; Ret	NÜR	NC	0
2015	Von Ryan Racing	Pro Cup	McLaren 650S GT3	MNZ; 15	SIL; 1	PAU	SPA; 29	NÜR; 1	4th	54
2016	Garage 59	Pro	McLaren 650S GT3	MNZ; 1	SIL; 6	PAU; 1	SPA; 31	NÜR	1st	68

==== Complete IMSA SportsCar Championship results ====
Year	Entrant	Class	Chassis	1	2	3	4	5	6	7	8	9	10	11	12	13	Rank	Points
2014	Alex Job Racing	GTD	Porsche 911 GT America	DAY; 8	SEB	LON	MAZ	DET	KAN	WAT	MOS	IND	RAM	VIR	COA	PLM	67th	45
2015	Alex Job Racing	GTD	Porsche 911 GT America	DAY; 2	SEB	LON	MAZ	DET	WAT	MOS	LIM	RAM	VIR	COA	PLM		31st	33
2016	Alex Job Racing	GTD	Porsche 911 GT3 R	DAY; 13	SEB	LON	MAZ	DET	WAT	MOS	LIM	RAM	VIR	COA	PLM		54th	19
2017	Riley Motorsports – WeatherTech Racing	GTD	Mercedes-AMG GT3	DAY; 21	SEB; Ret	LON	COA	DET	WAT; 4	MOS	LIM	RAM	VIR	MAZ	PLM		45th	48
2020	AIM Vasser Sullivan	GTD	Lexus RC F GT3	DAY; 12	DAY	SEB	ELK	VIR	ATL	MDO	CLT	PET	LGA	SEB			52nd	19
2025	Trackhouse by TF Sport	GTD Pro	Chevrolet Corvette Z06 GT3.R	DAY; 9	SEB	LGA	DET	WGL	MOS	ELK	VIR	IMS	PET				35th	243

==== Complete 24 Hours of Daytona results ====
Year	Team	Co-drivers	Car	Class	Laps	Pos.	Class pos.
2014	Alex Job Racing	(Canada) Louis-Philippe Dumoulin (United States) Leh Keen (United States) Shane Lewis (United States) Cooper MacNeil	Porsche 911 GT America	GTD	656	26th	8th
2015	Alex Job Racing	(United States) Andrew Davis (United States) Leh Keen (United States) Cooper MacNeil	Porsche 911 GT America	GTD	704	12th	**2nd**
2016	Alex Job Racing	(United States) Gunnar Jeannette (United States) Leh Keen (United States) Cooper MacNeil (United States) David MacNeil	Porsche 911 GT3 R	GTD	695	28th	13th
2017	Riley Motorsports – WeatherTech Racing	(Germany) Thomas Jäger (United States) Gunnar Jeannette (United States) Cooper MacNeil	Mercedes-AMG GT3	GTD	373	48th	21st
2020	AIM Vasser Sullivan	(United States) Townsend Bell (United States) Frankie Montecalvo (United States) Aaron Telitz	Lexus RC F GT3	GTD	728	31st	12th
2025	Trackhouse by TF Sport	(United States) Ben Keating (New Zealand) Scott McLaughlin (United States) Connor Zilisch	Chevrolet Corvette Z06 GT3.R	GTD Pro	722	25th	9th

==== Complete Spa 24 Hours results ====
Year	Team	Co-drivers	Car	Class	Laps	Pos.	Class pos.
2014	Von Ryan Racing	(United Kingdom) Tim Mullen (United Kingdom) Robert Bell	McLaren MP4-12C GT3	Pro Cup	40	DNF	DNF
2015	Von Ryan Racing	(United Kingdom) Robert Bell (France) Kévin Estre	McLaren 650S GT3	Pro Cup	457	29th	13th
2016	Garage 59	(United Kingdom) Robert Bell (France) Côme Ledogar	McLaren 650S GT3	Pro	513	31st	19th

==== Complete Intercontinental GT Challenge Series results ====
(key) (Races in bold indicate pole position) (Races in italics indicate fastest lap)

Year	Entrant	Class	Chassis	1	2	3	4	5	Rank	Points
2016	Tekno Autosports	P	McLaren 650S GT3	**BAT**; 1					3rd	42
2016	Garage 59	P	McLaren 650S GT3		SPA; 9^{31}				3rd	42
2016	K-Pax Racing	P	McLaren 650S GT3			SEP; 6^{10}			3rd	42
2017	Scott Taylor Motorsports	P	Mercedes AMG GT3	BAT; Ret	SPA	MAZ	SEP		NC	0
2018	YNA Autosport	P	McLaren 650S GT3	BAT; Ret	SPA	SUZ	LGA		NC	0
2019	Triple Eight Race Engineering	P	Mercedes AMG GT3	BAT; 3	LGA	SPA	SUZ	KYA	19th	15
2020	Triple Eight Race Engineering	P	Mercedes GT3 Evo	BAT; 2	IND	SPA	KYA		13th	18
2022	Triple Eight Race Engineering	PA	Mercedes GT3 Evo	BAT; 3	SPA	IND	GUL		15th	15

==== Complete 12 Hours of Sebring results ====
Year	Team	Co-drivers	Car	Class	Laps	Pos.	Class pos.
2017	Riley Motorsports – WeatherTech Racing	(United States) Cooper MacNeil (United States) Gunnar Jeannette	Mercedes-AMG GT3	GTD	132	44th (DNF)	21st (DNF)

==== Complete Asian Le Mans Series results ====
(key) (Races in bold indicate pole position) (Races in italics indicate fastest lap)

Year	Team	Class	Car	Engine	1	2	3	4	Pos.	Points
2019–20	Eurasia Motorsport	LMP2	Ligier JS P217	Gibson GK428 4.2 L V8	SHA	BEN; Ret	SEP	CHA	12th	0

==== Complete 24 Hours of Le Mans results ====
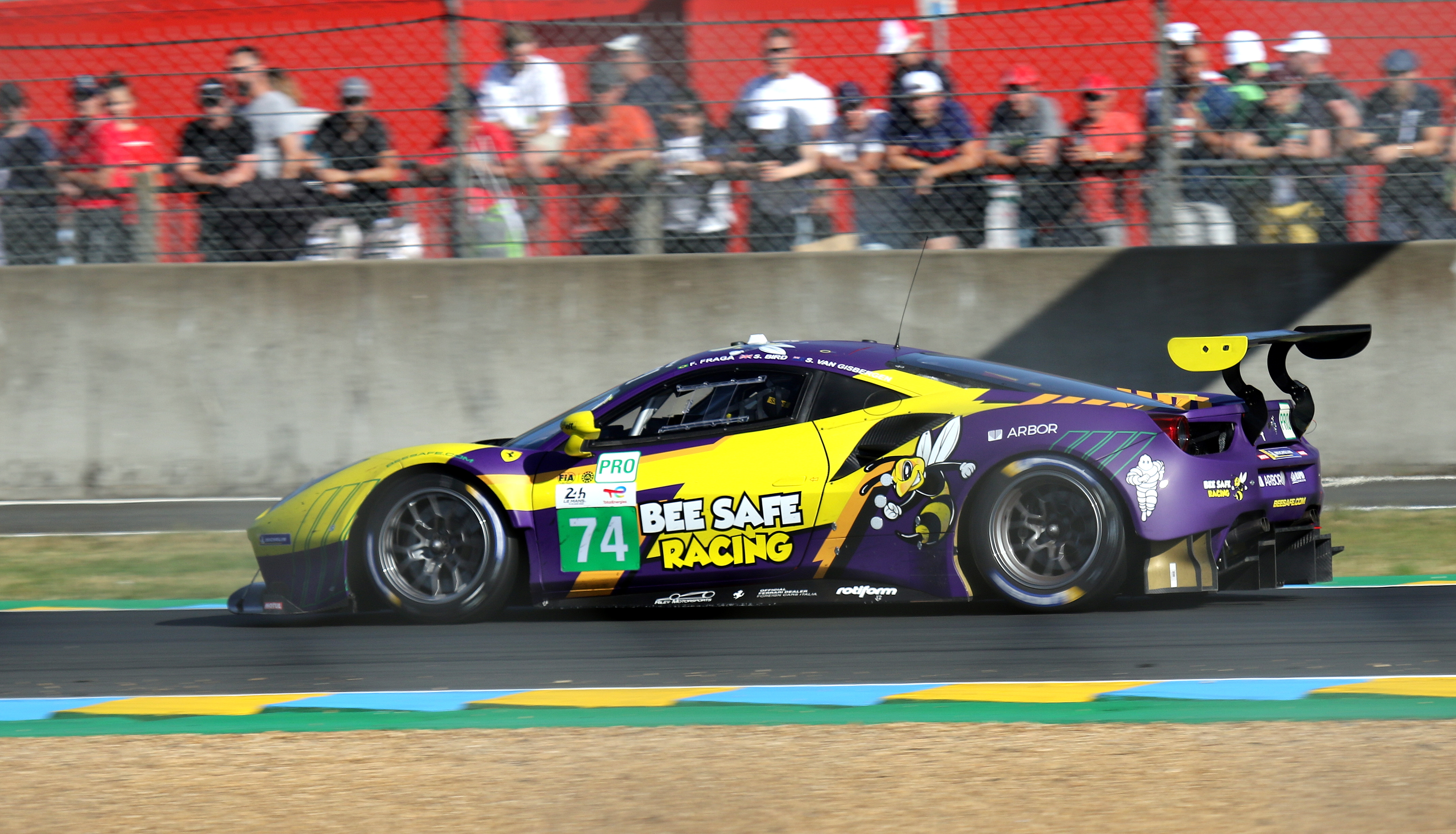
Van Gisbergen competing at Le Mans in 2022.

Year	Team	Co-Drivers	Car	Class	Laps	Pos.	Class Pos.
2022	(United States) Riley Motorsports	(United Kingdom) Sam Bird (Brazil) Felipe Fraga	Ferrari 488 GTE Evo	GTE; Pro	347	32nd	5th

=== Rally ===
==== World Rally Championship results ====
Year	Entrant	Car	1	2	3	4	5	6	7	8	9	10	11	12	13	Pos.	Pts
2022	Shane van Gisbergen	Škoda Fabia R5	MON	SWE	CRO	POR	ITA	KEN	EST	FIN	BEL	GRE	NZL; 9	ESP	JPN	33rd	2

==== World Rally Championship-2 results ====
Year	Entrant	Car	1	2	3	4	5	6	7	8	9	10	11	12	13	Pos.	Pts
2022	Shane van Gisbergen	Škoda Fabia R5	MON	SWE	CRO	POR	ITA	KEN	EST	FIN	BEL	GRE	NZL; 3	ESP	JPN	24th	16

=== NASCAR ===
(key) (Bold – Pole position awarded by qualifying time. Italics – Pole position earned by points standings or practice time. * – Most laps led.)

==== Cup Series ====
NASCAR Cup Series results
Year	Team	No.	Make	1	2	3	4	5	6	7	8	9	10	11	12	13	14	15	16	17	18	19	20	21	22	23	24	25	26	27	28	29	30	31	32	33	34	35	36	NCSC	Pts	Ref
2023	Trackhouse Racing	91	Chevy	DAY	CAL	LVS	PHO	ATL	COA	RCH	BRD	MAR	TAL	DOV	KAN	DAR	CLT	GTW	SON	NSH	CSC; 1	ATL	NHA	POC	RCH	MCH	IRC; 10	GLN	DAY	DAR	KAN	BRI	TEX	TAL	ROV	LVS	HOM	MAR	PHO	42nd	0^{1}	
2024	Kaulig Racing	16	Chevy	DAY	ATL	LVS	PHO	BRI	COA; 20	RCH	MAR	TEX	TAL; 28	DOV	KAN	DAR	CLT; 28	GTW	SON	IOW	NHA	NSH	CSC; 40	POC	IND	RCH	MCH	DAY; 35	DAR; 26	ATL; 32	GLN; 2	BRI	KAN	TAL; 15		LVS; 29	HOM	MAR; 12	PHO	45th	0^{1}	
2024	Kaulig Racing	13	Chevy																																**ROV**; 7					45th	0^{1}	
2025	Trackhouse Racing	88	Chevy	DAY; 33	ATL; 23	COA; 6	PHO; 31	LVS; 34	HOM; 32	MAR; 34	DAR; 20	BRI; 38	TAL; 29	TEX; 22	KAN; 20	CLT; 14	NSH; 25	MCH; 18	**MXC**; 1*	POC; 31	ATL; 24	**CSC**; 1	**SON**; 1*	DOV; 30	IND; 19	IOW; 31	GLN; 1*	RCH; 14	DAY; 16	DAR; 32	GTW; 25	BRI; 26	NHA; 32	KAN; 10	ROV; 1*	LVS; 33	TAL; 11	MAR; 14	PHO; 24	12th	2211	
2026	Trackhouse Racing	97	Chevy	DAY; 30	ATL; 6	COA; 2	PHO; 11	LVS; 36	DAR; 14	MAR; 11	BRI; 34	KAN; 36	TAL; 20	TEX; 17	**GLN**; 1*	CLT; 11	NSH; 5	MCH; 30	POC; 31	**COR**; 38	SON; 1*	CHI; 25	ATL; 6	NWS; 5	IND; 16	IOW; 30	RCH; 14	NHA; 20	DAY; 28	DAR; 26	GTW; 23	BRI; 20	KAN; 24	LVS; 9	CLT; 7	PHO; 26	TAL; 30	MAR; 5	HOM; 34	17th	774	

===== Daytona 500 =====
Year	Team	Manufacturer	Start	Finish
2025	Trackhouse Racing	Chevrolet	26	33
2026	Trackhouse Racing	Chevrolet	13	30

==== O'Reilly Auto Parts Series ====
NASCAR O'Reilly Auto Parts Series results
Year	Team	No.	Make	1	2	3	4	5	6	7	8	9	10	11	12	13	14	15	16	17	18	19	20	21	22	23	24	25	26	27	28	29	30	31	32	33	NOAPSC	Pts	Ref
2024	Kaulig Racing	97	Chevy	DAY; 12	ATL; 3	LVS; 37	PHO; 6	COA; 27*	RCH; 14	MAR; 11	TEX; 18	TAL; 22	DOV; 18	DAR; 15	CLT; 15	PIR; 1	**SON**; 1*	IOW; 34	NHA; 18	NSH; 15	**CSC**; 1*	POC; 31	IND; 4	MCH; 17	DAY; 25	DAR; 7	ATL; 27	GLN; 5	BRI; 18	KAN; 8	TAL; 35	**ROV**; 3	LVS; 38	HOM; 17	MAR; 28	PHO; 12	12th	2157	
2025	JR Motorsports	9	Chevy	DAY	ATL	COA	PHO	LVS	HOM	MAR	DAR	BRI	CAR	TAL	TEX	CLT	NSH	MXC	POC	ATL	**CSC**; 1*	**SON**; 2	DOV	IND	IOW	GLN; 31	DAY	PIR	GTW	BRI	KAN	ROV	LVS	TAL	MAR	PHO	78th	0^{1}	
2026	JR Motorsports	9	Chevy	DAY	ATL	COA; 1*	PHO	LVS	DAR	MAR	CAR	BRI	KAN	TAL	TEX	GLN; 8	DOV	CLT	NSH	POC	COR	**SON**; 1*	CHI	ATL	IND	IOW	DAY	DAR	GTW	BRI	LVS	CLT	PHO	TAL	MAR	HOM	68th	0^{1}	

==== Craftsman Truck Series ====
NASCAR Craftsman Truck Series results
Year	Team	No.	Make	1	2	3	4	5	6	7	8	9	10	11	12	13	14	15	16	17	18	19	20	21	22	23	24	25	NCTC	Pts	Ref
2023	Niece Motorsports	41	Chevy	DAY	LVS	ATL	COA	TEX	BRD	MAR	KAN	DAR	NWS	CLT	GTW	NSH	MOH	POC	RCH	IRP; 19	MLW	KAN	BRI	TAL	HOM	PHO			63rd	18	
2026	Niece Motorsports	4	Chevy	DAY	ATL	STP	DAR	CAR	BRI	TEX	GLN; 3	DOV																	100th	0^{1}	
2026	Spire Motorsports	71	Chevy										CLT; 15	NSH	MCH	COR	LRP	NWS; 3	IRP										100th	0^{1}	
2026	Spire Motorsports	7	Chevy																	**RCH**; 4	NHA	BRI	KAN	CLT	PHO	TAL	MAR	HOM	100th	0^{1}	

^{*} Season still in progress
^{1} Ineligible for series points

=== ARCA Menards Series ===
(key) (Bold – Pole position awarded by qualifying time. Italics – Pole position earned by points standings or practice time. * – Most laps led.)

ARCA Menards Series results
Year	Team	No.	Make	1	2	3	4	5	6	7	8	9	10	11	12	13	14	15	16	17	18	19	20	AMSC	Pts	Ref
2024	Pinnacle Racing Group	28	Chevy	DAY; 29	PHO	TAL	DOV	KAN	CLT	IOW	MOH	BLN	IRP	SLM	ELK	MCH	ISF	MLW	DSF	GLN	BRI	KAN	TOL	110th	15	

=== CARS Late Model Stock Car Tour ===
(key) (Bold – Pole position awarded by qualifying time. Italics – Pole position earned by points standings or practice time. * – Most laps led. ** – All laps led.)

CARS Late Model Stock Car Tour results
Year	Team	No.	Make	1	2	3	4	5	6	7	8	9	10	11	12	13	14	CLMSCTC	Pts	Ref
2026	Hettinger Racing	51V	Chevy	SNM	WCS	NSV	CRW	ACE	LGY	DOM	NWS	HCY	AND	FLC; 13	TCM	NPS	SBO	61st	29	

Sporting positions
Preceded by Will Davison	Winner of the Clipsal 500; 2013	Succeeded by James Courtney
Preceded by Katsumasa Chiyo; Wolfgang Reip; Florian Strauss	Winner of the Bathurst 12 Hour; 2016; With: Álvaro Parente & Jonathon Webb	Succeeded by Craig Lowndes; Toni Vilander; Jamie Whincup
Preceded by Garth Tander; Warren Luff	Pirtek Enduro Cup; Champion; 2016; With: Alexandre Prémat	Succeeded by Chaz Mostert; Steve Owen
Preceded by Mark Winterbottom	International V8 Supercars Championship; Champion; 2016	Succeeded by Jamie Whincup
Preceded by Scott McLaughlin	Supercars Championship; Champion; 2021, 2022	Succeeded by Brodie Kostecki
Preceded by Alex Buncombe; Katsumasa Chiyo; Wolfgang Reip	Blancpain GT Series Endurance Cup champion 2016; With: Robert Bell & Côme Ledogar	Succeeded by Mirko Bortolotti; Andrea Caldarelli; Christian Engelhart
Preceded by Nick Percat	Winner of the Clipsal 500; 2017 & 2018	Succeeded by Scott McLaughlin
Preceded by Scott McLaughlin; Alexandre Prémat	Winner of the Bathurst 1000; 2020; With: Garth Tander	Succeeded by Chaz Mostert; Lee Holdsworth
Preceded by Igor Fraga	New Zealand Grand Prix; Winner; 2021	Succeeded by Laurens van Hoepen (2023)
Preceded by Chaz Mostert; Lee Holdsworth	Winner of the Bathurst 1000; 2022; With: Garth Tander	Succeeded by Shane van Gisbergen; Richie Stanaway
Preceded by Shane van Gisbergen; Garth Tander	Winner of the Bathurst 1000; 2023; With: Richie Stanaway	Succeeded by Brodie Kostecki; Todd Hazelwood
Awards and achievements
Preceded by Laurens Vanthoor	Allan Simonsen Trophy (Pole position Bathurst 12 Hour); 2016	Succeeded by Toni Vilander
Preceded by Jamie Whincup	Jason Richards Memorial Trophy; 2016	Succeeded by Jamie Whincup
Preceded by David Reynolds	Barry Sheene Medal; 2019	Succeeded by Scott McLaughlin
Preceded by Scott McLaughlin	Jason Richards Memorial Trophy; 2019, 2022	Succeeded by Anton de Pasquale
Preceded by Chaz Mostert	Larry Perkins Trophy; 2022	Succeeded by Brodie Kostecki
