= List of foreign-born NASCAR race winners =

This article lists NASCAR drivers born outside the United States who have won at least once in any of the top three series (NASCAR Cup Series, O'Reilly Auto Parts Series, or Craftsman Truck Series). New Zealander Shane van Gisbergen is the most successful foreign-born driver, in terms of wins, in NASCAR history, having won 14 times overall. With his first Cup Series win on June 12, 2022, Suárez became the first foreign-born driver to win on all three of NASCAR's national series, and the 35th driver in NASCAR's history to accomplish this feat.

== NASCAR Cup Series ==
- Note: The table is ordered by number of wins; multiple drivers with the same number of wins are ordered by date of first win.

Driver	Wins	First win			Last win			Ref
Driver	Wins	Race	Date	Track	Race	Date	Track	Ref
(New Zealand) Shane van Gisbergen	8	Grant Park 220	July 2, 2023	(Illinois) Chicago Street Course	Toyota/Save Mart 350	June 28, 2026	(California) Sonoma Raceway	
(Mexico) Daniel Suárez	3	Toyota/Save Mart 350	June 12, 2022	(California) Sonoma Raceway	Coca-Cola 600	May 24, 2026	(North Carolina) Charlotte Motor Speedway	
(Colombia) Juan Pablo Montoya	2	Toyota/Save Mart 350	June 24, 2007	(California) Infineon Raceway	Heluva Good! Sour Cream Dips at The Glen	August 8, 2010	(New York (state)) Watkins Glen International	
(Australia) Marcos Ambrose	2	Heluva Good! Sour Cream Dips at The Glen	August 14, 2011	(New York (state)) Watkins Glen International	Finger Lakes 355 at The Glen	August 12, 2012	(New York (state)) Watkins Glen International	
(Italy) Mario Andretti^{1}	1	Daytona 500	February 26, 1967	(Florida) Daytona International Speedway	Daytona 500	February 26, 1967	(Florida) Daytona International Speedway	
(Canada) Earl Ross	1	Old Dominion 500	September 29, 1974	(Virginia) Martinsville Speedway	Old Dominion 500	September 29, 1974	(Virginia) Martinsville Speedway	

^{1} Mario Andretti became a naturalized American citizen in 1964. His birthplace, known as Montona, Italy when he was born in 1940, is now known as Motovun, Croatia.

== NASCAR O'Reilly Auto Parts Series ==
- Note: The table is ordered by number of wins; multiple drivers with the same number of wins are ordered by date of first win.

Driver	Wins	First win			Last win			Ref
Driver	Wins	Race	Date	Track	Race	Date	Track	Ref
(New Zealand) Shane van Gisbergen	6	Pacific Office Automation 147	June 1, 2024	(Oregon) Portland International Raceway	Pit Boss/FoodMaxx 250	June 27, 2026	(California) Sonoma Raceway	
(Australia) Marcos Ambrose	5	Zippo 200 at the Glen	August 9, 2008	(New York (state)) Watkins Glen International	Zippo 200 at the Glen	August 9, 2014	(New York (state)) Watkins Glen International	
(Canada) Ron Fellows	4	Lysol 200	June 28, 1998	(New York (state)) Watkins Glen International	NAPA Auto Parts 200	August 2, 2008	Circuit Gilles Villeneuve	
(Mexico) Daniel Suárez	4	Menards 250	June 11, 2016	Michigan International Speedway	The Chilango 150	June 14, 2025	(Mexico) Autódromo Hermanos Rodríguez	
(Canada) Larry Pollard	1	Busch 200	August 9, 1987	(Virginia) Langley Speedway	Busch 200	August 9, 1987	(Virginia) Langley Speedway	
(Colombia) Juan Pablo Montoya	1	Telcel-Motorola Mexico 200	March 4, 2007	(Mexico) Autódromo Hermanos Rodríguez	Telcel-Motorola Mexico 200	March 4, 2007	(Mexico) Autódromo Hermanos Rodríguez	
(Brazil) Nelson Piquet Jr.^{1}	1	Sargento 200	June 23, 2012	(Wisconsin) Road America	Sargento 200	June 23, 2012	(Wisconsin) Road America	

^{1} Nelson Piquet Jr. was born in then-West Germany to a Dutch mother and Brazilian father. Piquet Jr. was raised in Brazil.

== NASCAR CRAFTSMAN Truck Series ==
- Note: The table is ordered by number of wins; multiple drivers with the same number of wins are ordered by date of first win.

Driver	Wins	First win			Last win			Ref
Driver	Wins	Race	Date	Track	Race	Date	Track	Ref
(Canada) Stewart Friesen	4	Eldora Dirt Derby	August 1, 2019	(Ohio) Eldora	DQS Solutions & Staffing 250	June 7, 2025	Michigan	
(Canada) Ron Fellows	2	Parts America 150	August 24, 1997	(New York (state)) Watkins Glen	Bully Hill Vineyards 150	June 26, 1999	(New York (state)) Watkins Glen	
(Brazil) Nelson Piquet Jr.	2	VFW 200	August 18, 2012	Michigan	Smith's 350	September 29, 2012	(Nevada) Las Vegas	
(Mexico) Daniel Suárez	1	Lucas Oil 150	November 11, 2016	(Arizona) Phoenix	Lucas Oil 150	November 11, 2016	(Arizona) Phoenix	
(Canada) Raphaël Lessard	1	Chevrolet Silverado 250	October 3, 2020	(Alabama) Talladega	Chevrolet Silverado 250	October 3, 2020	(Alabama) Talladega	

== Combined wins by nationality ==
Of the 49 combined wins in NASCAR's top three national series by foreign-born drivers, New Zealand drivers have earned 14 (28.6%) of the wins.

Key
**Bold**	Driver has competed in one of the three national series in the 2026 NASCAR season

List of races won, by nationality of driver
Rank	Country	Wins	Driver(s)	No. of drivers
1	New Zealand	14	**Shane van Gisbergen** (14)	1
2	Canada	13	Ron Fellows (6), **Stewart Friesen** (4), Earl Ross (1), Larry Pollard (1), Raphaël Lessard (1)	5
3	Mexico	8	**Daniel Suárez** (8)	1
4	Australia	7	Marcos Ambrose (7)	1
5	Colombia	3	Juan Pablo Montoya (3)	1
5	Brazil	3	Nelson Piquet Jr. (3)	1
7	Italy	1	Mario Andretti (1)	1

== See also ==
- List of all-time NASCAR Cup Series winners
- List of Hispanic and Latin American NASCAR drivers
- List of Canadian NASCAR drivers
- Road course ringer
- Daytona 500
