= List of female racing drivers =

This is a list of notable, professional, and female racing drivers or riders in any form of motorsport, sorted by discipline.

== Car racing ==
| Name | Nationality | Date of birth | Date of death | Notable championships / competitions | Ref |
|---|---|---|---|---|---|
| María Abbate | Argentina | 11 October 1979 (age 47) | | Fórmula 4 Argentina, Top Race Junior | |
| Michele Abbate | United States | March 9, 1988 (age 38) | | Trans-Am Series | |
| Mishael Abbott | United States | June 21, 1981 (age 45) | | Indy Pro Series, IMSA Lites | |
| Alisha Abdullah | India | 24 July 1989 (age 37) | | Volkswagen Polo Cup India | |
| Gina-Maria Adenauer | Germany | 16 August 1985 (age 41) | | Formula 3 Euro Series | |
| Ayla Ågren | Norway | 23 July 1993 (age 33) | | F1600 Championship Series, U.S. F2000 National Championship, W Series | |
| Valentina Albanese | Italy | 27 March 1974 (age 52) | | Italian Superturismo Championship | |
| Cyndie Allemann | Switzerland | 4 April 1986 (age 40) | | Formula Renault Eurocup, Indy Lights, Super GT Series | |
| Amna Al Qubaisi | United Arab Emirates | 28 March 2000 (age 26) | | Formula Regional European Championship, F1 Academy | |
| Hamda Al Qubaisi | United Arab Emirates | 8 August 2002 (age 24) | | Formula Regional European Championship, F1 Academy | |
| Lilí Álvarez | Spain | 9 May 1905 | 8 July 1998 (aged 93) | Catalan Automobile Championship | |
| Giovanna Amati | Italy | 20 July 1959 (age 67) | | International Formula 3000, Formula One | |
| Aiva Anagnostiadis | Australia | 9 August 2007 (age 19) | | F1 Academy | |
| Chelsea Angelo | Australia | 2 June 1996 (age 30) | | Australian F3 Championship, V8 Supercars Development Series, TCR Australia | |
| Maria Antonietta Avanzo | Italy | 5 February 1889 | 17 January 1977 (aged 87) | Targa Florio, Mille Miglia | |
| Jessica Bäckman | Sweden | 25 August 1997 (age 29) | | TCR Europe, TCR Germany, World Touring Car Cup | |
| Amber Balcaen | Canada | March 7, 1992 (age 34) | | ARCA Menards Series, CARS Super Late Model Tour | |
| Julia Ballario | Argentina | 20 January 1992 (age 34) | | U.S. F2000 National Championship, TC Pista Mouras, Turismo Nacional Argentina | |
| Kayli Barker | United States | July 25, 1997 (age 29) | | NASCAR Whelen All-American Series | |
| Antonella Bassani | Brazil | 12 April 2006 (age 20) | | Porsche Carrera Cup Brasil, Stock Car Brasil | |
| Chiara Bättig | Switzerland | 21 March 2010 (age 16) | | F1 Academy, F4 British Championship | |
| Nicole Behar | United States | November 15, 1997 (age 28) | | NASCAR K&N Pro Series West | |
| Mackena Bell | United States | June 9, 1990 (age 36) | | NASCAR K&N Pro Series East, NASCAR Nationwide Series | |
| Adrienn Bende | Hungary | 25 June 1985 (age 41) | | Lotus Ladies Cup | |
| Lisa Billard | France | 12 September 2009 (age 17) | | F1 Academy | |
| Sherry Blakley | United States | March 16, 1962 | February 13, 2011 (aged 48) | NASCAR Busch Series | |
| Sarah Bovy | Belgium | 15 May 1989 (age 37) | | W Series, FIA World Endurance Championship, IMSA SportsCar Championship | |
| Toni Breidinger | United States | July 14, 1999 (age 27) | | ARCA Menards Series, NASCAR Craftsman Truck Series | |
| Lindsay Brewer | United States | April 17, 1997 (age 29) | | USF Pro 2000 Championship, Indy NXT, Lamborghini Super Trofeo North America | |
| Megan Bruce | England | 2 August 2004 (age 22) | | F1 Academy | |
| Lisa Christin Brunner | Germany | 27 September 1992 (age 34) | | ADAC Procar Series | |
| Lilian Bryner | Switzerland | 21 April 1959 (age 67) | | FIA GT Championship | |
| Alice Buckley | Australia | 11 July 2007 (age 19) | | Super2 Series | |
| Léna Bühler | Switzerland | 9 July 1997 (age 29) | | Formula Regional European Championship, F1 Academy, Le Mans Cup | |
| Michele Bumgarner | Philippines | 2 September 1989 (age 37) | | Asian Formula 3 Championship, Star Mazda Championship | |
| Bridget Burgess | Australia | 26 December 2001 (age 24) | | ARCA Menards Series West, ARCA Menards Series | |
| Bianca Bustamante | Philippines | 19 January 2005 (age 21) | | W Series, F1 Academy, GB3 Championship | |
| Vicki Butler-Henderson | England | 16 February 1972 (age 54) | | Porsche Carrera Cup Great Britain, Mini Challenge UK | |
| Maite Cáceres | Uruguay | 6 August 2002 (age 24) | | F1 Academy | |
| Tatiana Calderón | Colombia | 10 March 1993 (age 33) | | FIA Formula 2 Championship, IndyCar Series, IMSA SportsCar Championship | |
| Suzane Carvalho | Brazil | 26 December 1963 (age 62) | | Formula 3 Sudamericana | |
| Michela Cerruti | Italy | 18 February 1987 (age 39) | | Superstars Series, Formula E, TCR International Series | |
| Chloe Chambers | United States | June 14, 2004 (age 22) | | W Series, F1 Academy | |
| Amanda Chick | United States | October 17, 2001 (age 25) | | ARCA Menards Series | |
| Chloe Chong | England | 27 March 2007 (age 19) | | F1 Academy | |
| Sara Christian | United States | August 25, 1918 | March 7, 1980 (aged 61) | NASCAR Grand National Series | |
| Joanne Ciconte | Australia | 14 December 2008 (age 17) | | F1 Academy | |
| Jennifer Jo Cobb | United States | June 12, 1973 (age 53) | | NASCAR Craftsman Truck Series, NASCAR Xfinity Series | |
| Paula Cook | England | 2 November 1969 (age 56) | | British Touring Car Championship, Porsche Supercup | |
| Sabré Cook | United States | May 21, 1994 (age 32) | | U.S. F2000 National Championship, W Series, Porsche Carrera Cup North America | |
| Amber Cope | United States | August 18, 1983 (age 43) | | ARCA Re/Max Series, NASCAR Nationwide Series | |
| Violette Cordery | England | 10 January 1900 | 30 December 1983 (aged 83) | Dewar Trophy | |
| Sarah Cornett-Ching | Canada | May 8, 1991 (age 35) | | ARCA Racing Series, NASCAR Canadian Tire Series | |
| Kaylee Countryman | United States | January 3, 2010 (age 16) | | F1 Academy, USF2000 Championship | |
| Roberta Cowell | England | 8 April 1918 | 11 October 2011 (aged 93) | Grand Prix motor racing | |
| Erin Crocker | United States | March 23, 1981 (age 45) | | ARCA Re/Max Series, NASCAR Craftsman Truck Series, NASCAR Busch Series | |
| Courtney Crone | United States | March 7, 2001 (age 25) | | IMSA Prototype Challenge, F1 Academy | |
| Kim Crosby | United States | December 8, 1964 (age 61) | | ARCA Re/Max Series, NASCAR Busch Series | |
| Joan Newton Cuneo | United States | July 22, 1876 | March 24, 1934 (aged 57) | various American road-racing events | |
| Lucile Cypriano | France | 2 September 1996 (age 30) | | SEAT León Eurocup, TCR International Series | |
| Danica Dart | United States | August 3, 2007 (age 19) | | ARCA Menards Series West | |
| Claire Decker | United States | February 22, 1995 (age 31) | | NASCAR Camping World Truck Series, NASCAR Xfinity Series | |
| Natalie Decker | United States | June 25, 1997 (age 29) | | NASCAR Camping World Truck Series, NASCAR Xfinity Series | |
| Paige Decker | United States | March 20, 1993 (age 33) | | NASCAR Camping World Truck Series, NASCAR Xfinity Series | |
| Ana Beatriz de Figueiredo | Brazil | 18 March 1985 (age 41) | | IndyCar Series, Stock Car Brasil | |
| Maria Teresa de Filippis | Italy | 11 November 1926 | 9 January 2016 (aged 89) | Italian Sportscar Championship, Formula One | |
| Emely de Heus | Netherlands | 10 February 2003 (age 23) | | W Series, F1 Academy, Porsche Carrera Cup Germany | |
| Michelle de Jesus | Brazil | 1981 (age 44–45) | | Brasileiro de Marcas | |
| Gabrielle de la Merced | Philippines | 10 August 1982 (age 44) | | Asian Formula 3 Championship | |
| Ana Delfosse | Argentina | 1931 | 23 April 2017 (aged 85–86) | Argentine Pure Speed Championship | |
| Simona de Silvestro | Switzerland | 1 September 1988 (age 38) | | IndyCar Series, Formula E, Supercars Championship | |
| María de Villota | Spain | 13 January 1979 | 11 October 2013 (aged 34) | World Touring Car Championship, Superleague Formula | |
| Ava Dobson | United States | June 9, 2008 (age 18) | | F1 Academy | |
| Kati Droste | Germany | 26 December 1984 (age 41) | | Nürburgring Langstrecken-Serie | |
| Maryeve Dufault | Canada | February 16, 1982 (age 44) | | NASCAR Nationwide Series, ARCA Racing Series | |
| Camille du Gast | France | 30 May 1868 | 24 April 1942 (aged 73) | Gordon Bennett Cup, Paris–Madrid | |
| Milka Duno | Venezuela | 22 April 1972 (age 54) | | American Le Mans Series, Indy Racing League | |
| Abbie Eaton | England | 2 January 1992 (age 34) | | British GT Championship, Super2 Series, W Series | |
| Jessica Edgar | England | 15 March 2005 (age 21) | | F1 Academy | |
| Carlotta Fedeli | Italy | 3 February 1992 (age 34) | | TCR Italy, TCR International Series | |
| Emma Felbermayr | Austria | 27 January 2007 (age 19) | | F1 Academy | |
| Rafaela Ferreira | Brazil | 18 April 2005 (age 21) | | F1 Academy | |
| Catharina Felser | Germany | 2 October 1982 (age 44) | | German Formula Three Championship, GT4 European Series | |
| Leanne Ferrier | Australia | 5 June 1980 (age 46) | | Australian Formula Ford Championship, V8 Supercars Development Series | |
| Natasha Firman | Ireland | 22 June 1976 (age 50) | | Formula Woman | |
| Sarah Fisher | United States | October 4, 1980 (age 46) | | Indy Racing League, NASCAR West Series | |
| Zoe Florescu | Romania | 23 December 2008 (age 17) | | F4 Spanish Championship | |
| Sophia Flörsch | Germany | 1 December 2000 (age 25) | | FIA Formula 3 Championship, DTM, FIA World Endurance Championship | |
| Ashley Freiberg | United States | November 22, 1991 (age 34) | | Star Mazda Championship, IMSA SportsCar Championship | |
| Rahel Frey | Switzerland | 23 February 1986 (age 40) | | DTM, FIA World Endurance Championship, IMSA Sportscar Championship | |
| Natacha Gachnang | Switzerland | 27 October 1987 (age 38) | | Star Mazda Championship, MSV Formula 2, European Le Mans Series | |
| Karen Gaillard | Switzerland | 29 June 2001 (age 25) | | Ultimate Cup Series, Porsche Carrera Cup France | |
| Divina Galica | England | 13 August 1944 (age 82) | | European Formula 2 Championship, Formula One | |
| Cassandra Gannis | United States | April 7, 1991 (age 35) | | NASCAR K&N Pro Series West | |
| Belén García Espinar | Spain | 26 July 1999 (age 27) | | W Series, Formula Regional European Championship, European Le Mans Series | |
| Marta García López | Spain | 9 August 2000 (age 26) | | W Series, F1 Academy, Le Mans Cup | |
| Michelle Gatting | Denmark | 31 December 1993 (age 32) | | European Le Mans Series, FIA World Endurance Championship | |
| Megan Gilkes | Canada | November 6, 2000 (age 25) | | W Series, F1 Academy | |
| Samin Gómez | Venezuela | 4 February 1992 (age 34) | | GP3 Series | |
| Tina Gordon | United States | March 14, 1969 (age 57) | | NASCAR Busch Series, NASCAR Craftsman Truck Series | |
| Manuela Gostner | Italy | 19 May 1984 (age 42) | | Ferrari Challenge, European Le Mans Series, 24 Hours of Le Mans | |
| Rita Goulet | United States | August 25, 1983 (age 43) | | ARCA Menards Series West, ARCA Menards Series | |
| Renee Gracie | Australia | 5 January 1995 (age 31) | | Porsche Carrera Cup Australia, Super2 Series, GT World Challenge Australia | |
| Chloe Grant | Scotland | 20 March 2006 (age 20) | | F1 Academy | |
| Andrina Gugger | Switzerland | 18 April 1991 (age 35) | | Blancpain Endurance Series, ADAC GT Masters | |
| Janet Guthrie | United States | March 7, 1938 (age 88) | | USAC Championship Car, NASCAR Winston Cup Series | |
| Anett György | Hungary | 7 October 1996 (age 30) | | European Touring Car Cup, TCR International Series | |
| Taylor Hagler | United States | October 4, 1995 (age 31) | | Michelin Pilot Challenge | |
| Michelle Halder | Germany | 25 July 1999 (age 27) | | Nürburgring Langstrecken-Serie, TCR Europe | |
| Elisabeth Halliday | United States | December 14, 1978 (age 47) | | FIA GT Championship, American Le Mans Series | |
| Tina Hausmann | Switzerland | 5 October 2006 (age 20) | | F1 Academy | |
| Nicole Havrda | Canada | January 24, 2006 (age 20) | | Formula Regional Americas Championship, F1 Academy | |
| Esmee Hawkey | England | 2 March 1998 (age 28) | | Porsche Carrera Cup Great Britain, W Series, DTM | |
| Jessica Hawkins | England | 16 February 1995 (age 31) | | W Series, British Touring Car Championship, GT World Challenge Europe | |
| Arlene Hiss | United States | 1941 (age 83–84) | | USAC Championship Car | |
| Shea Holbrook | United States | April 10, 1990 (age 36) | | Pirelli World Challenge, W Series | |
| Sabrina Hungerbühler | Switzerland | 2 December 1982 (age 43) | | Formula BMW | |
| Claudia Hürtgen | Germany | 10 September 1971 (age 55) | | 24 Hours of Le Mans, Nürburgring Langstrecken-Serie | |
| Vanina Ickx | Belgium | 16 February 1975 (age 51) | | 24 Hours of Le Mans, DTM | |
| Keiko Ihara | Japan | 4 July 1973 (age 53) | | British Formula 3 International Series, FIA World Endurance Championship | |
| Anna Inotsume | Japan | 15 February 1995 (age 31) | | Super Taikyu Series, Formula Regional Japanese Championship | |
| Rebecca Jackson | England | 28 August 1982 (age 44) | | BRSCC Porsche Championship | |
| Jade Jacquet | France | 1 December 2009 (age 16) | | F1 Academy | |
| Gabriela Jílková | Czechia | 2 April 1995 (age 31) | | GT4 European Series, Prototype Cup Germany, Indian Racing League | |
| Carmen Jordá | Spain | 28 May 1988 (age 38) | | Indy Lights, GP3 Series | |
| Reema Juffali | Saudi Arabia | 18 January 1992 (age 34) | | F4 British Championship, GT World Challenge Europe | |
| Eliška Junková | Czechoslovakia | 16 November 1900 | 5 January 1994 (aged 93) | Targa Florio | |
| Seda Kaçan | Turkey | 6 January 1993 (age 33) | | TCR European Endurance | |
| Corinna Kamper | Austria | 19 August 1994 (age 32) | | Formula Renault 2.0 NEC, ADAC Formula Masters | |
| Sarah Kavanagh | Ireland | 3 June 1973 (age 53) | | Formula Nippon | |
| Ines Keil-Folville | Germany | 15 August 1885 | 25 August 1980 (aged 95) | Grand Prix motor racing | |
| Vivien Keszthelyi | Hungary | 7 December 2000 (age 25) | | Audi Sport TT Cup, W Series, EuroFormula Open | |
| Emma Kimiläinen | Finland | 8 July 1989 (age 37) | | ADAC Formula Masters, Scandinavian Touring Car Championship, W Series | |
| Esmee Kosterman | Netherlands | 16 April 2005 (age 21) | | F1 Academy | |
| Natalia Kowalska | Poland | 31 December 1989 (age 36) | | MSV Formula 2 | |
| Stéphane Kox | Netherlands | 25 December 1993 (age 32) | | ADAC Formula Masters, SEAT León Supercopa | |
| Miki Koyama | Japan | 5 September 1997 (age 29) | | W Series, Formula Regional Japanese Championship, Super GT Series | |
| Ulrike Krafft | Germany | 31 March 1984 (age 42) | | ADAC Procar Series, European Touring Car Cup | |
| Julia Kuhn | Germany | 7 June 1985 (age 41) | | Formula 3 Euro Series | |
| Julia Landauer | United States | November 12, 1991 (age 34) | | NASCAR K&N Pro Series West, NASCAR Xfinity Series | |
| Alba Larsen | Denmark | 12 December 2008 (age 17) | | F1 Academy | |
| Nattanid Leewattanavaragul | Thailand | 16 May 1993 (age 33) | | Thailand Super Series, TCR International Series | |
| Fiona Leggate | England | 28 May 1980 (age 46) | | British Touring Car Championship | |
| Katherine Legge | England | 12 July 1980 (age 46) | | DTM, IndyCar Series, IMSA SportsCar Championship | |
| Nettan Lindgren-Jansson | Sweden | 13 March 1957 (age 69) | | British Touring Car Championship, Scandinavian Touring Car Championship | |
| Ella Lloyd | Wales | 20 July 2005 (age 21) | | F1 Academy | |
| Lella Lombardi | Italy | 26 March 1941 | 3 March 1992 (aged 50) | Formula 5000, Formula One, World Sportscar Championship | |
| Lola Lovinfosse | France | 17 October 2005 (age 21) | | F1 Academy, Lamborghini Super Trofeo | |
| Nicole Lüttecke | Germany | 14 November 1974 (age 51) | | Nürburgring Langstrecken-Serie, Porsche Supercup | |
| Teri MacDonald | Canada | November 8, 1963 (age 62) | | NASCAR Craftsman Truck Series | |
| Pippa Mann | England | 11 August 1983 (age 43) | | Formula Renault 3.5, Indy Lights, IndyCar Series | |
| Nerea Martí | Spain | 2 January 2002 (age 24) | | W Series, F1 Academy | |
| Célia Martin | France | 4 October 1991 (age 35) | | Nürburgring Langstrecken-Serie, FIA World Endurance Championship | |
| Robin McCall | United States | January 20, 1964 (age 62) | | NASCAR Winston Cup Series | |
| Denise McCluggage | United States | January 20, 1927 | May 6, 2015 (aged 88) | 12 Hours of Sebring, Nürburgring 1000 km | |
| Shannon McIntosh | United States | July 24, 1989 (age 37) | | U.S. F2000 National Championship, ARCA Racing Series | |
| Annette Meeuvissen | Germany | 12 April 1962 | 5 December 2004 (aged 42) | World Touring Car Championship, DTM | |
| Milou Mets | Netherlands | 3 March 1990 (age 36) | | NASCAR Euro Series | |
| Donna Mae Mims | United States | July 1, 1927 | October 6, 2009 (aged 82) | SCCA National Sports Car Championship | |
| Sara Misir | Jamaica | 29 January 1998 (age 28) | | Caribbean Motor Racing Championship, GT Cup Championship | |
| Logan Misuraca | United States | June 5, 1999 (age 27) | | ARCA Menards Series | |
| Ai Miura | Japan | 24 November 1989 (age 36) | | Japanese Formula 3 Championship | |
| Ethel Mobley | United States | March 8, 1914 | June 26, 1984 (aged 70) | NASCAR Strictly Stock Series | |
| Alexandra Mohnhaupt | Mexico | 25 November 1999 (age 26) | | NACAM Formula 4 Championship, NASCAR Mexico Truck Series | |
| Patty Moise | United States | December 29, 1960 (age 65) | | NASCAR Busch Series, NASCAR Winston Cup Series | |
| Rebecca Monopoli | United States | June 28, 1989 (age 37) | | ARCA Menards Series | |
| Sarah Moore | England | 22 October 1993 (age 33) | | Britcar Endurance Series, W Series | |
| Cathy Muller | France | 21 November 1962 (age 63) | | World Sportscar Championship, International Formula 3000 | |
| Leilani Münter | United States | February 18, 1974 (age 52) | | Indy Pro Series, ARCA Menards Series | |
| Alessandra Neri | Italy | 10 April 1988 (age 38) | | Italian GT Championship, TCR International Series | |
| Marylin Niederhauser | Switzerland | 8 August 1995 (age 31) | | ADAC Formula 4, GT4 Central European Cup | |
| Christina Nielsen | Denmark | 10 January 1992 (age 34) | | IMSA SportsCar Championship, 24 Hours of Le Mans | |
| Aurelia Nobels | Brazil | 7 January 2007 (age 19) | | F1 Academy | |
| Juju Noda | Japan | 2 February 2006 (age 20) | | W Series, EuroFormula Open, Super Formula | |
| Beate Nodes | West Germany | 23 May 1964 | 19 October 2008 (aged 44) | World Sportscar Championship, DTM | |
| Miki Onaga | Japan | 4 November 1997 (age 28) | | Kyojo Cup | |
| Alli Owens | United States | September 2, 1988 (age 38) | | ARCA Menards Series, NASCAR Xfinity Series | |
| Lyubov Ozeretskovskaya | Kazakhstan | 21 November 1996 (age 29) | | Formula Masters Russia, Formula 4 South East Asia | |
| Mathilda Paatz | Germany | 1 August 2008 (age 18) | | F1 Academy | |
| Alisha Palmowski | England | 21 September 2006 (age 20) | | F1 Academy | |
| Danica Patrick | United States | March 25, 1982 (age 44) | | Indy Racing League, NASCAR Monster Energy Cup Series | |
| Tasmin Pepper | South Africa | 19 June 1990 (age 36) | | VW Polo Cup South Africa, W Series | |
| Carole Perrin | France | 7 July 1986 (age 40) | | NASCAR Euro Series | |
| Kay Petre | Canada | May 10, 1903 | August 10, 1994 (aged 91) | Grand Prix motor racing | |
| Doriane Pin | France | 6 January 2004 (age 22) | | Ferrari Challenge, FIA World Endurance Championship, F1 Academy | |
| Vittoria Piria | Italy | 11 November 1993 (age 32) | | GP3 Series, W Series, Italian GT Championship | |
| Nina Pothof-Gademan | Netherlands | 30 August 2003 (age 23) | | F1 Academy | |
| Alice Powell | England | 26 January 1993 (age 33) | | GP3 Series, W Series, IMSA SportsCar Championship | |
| Abbi Pulling | England | 21 March 2003 (age 23) | | W Series, F1 Academy, GB3 Championship | |
| Gosia Rdest | Poland | 14 January 1993 (age 33) | | Audi Sport TT Cup, W Series, Alpine Europa Cup | |
| Deborah Renshaw | United States | October 28, 1975 (age 50) | | ARCA Re/Max Series, NASCAR Craftsman Truck Series | |
| Mara Reyes | Mexico | 12 March 1977 (age 49) | | NASCAR Mexico Series, NASCAR Busch Series | |
| Johanna Robbins | United States | May 26, 1992 (age 34) | | NASCAR Camping World Truck Series, NASCAR Xfinity Series | |
| Rachel Robertson | Scotland | 28 July 2007 (age 19) | | F1 Academy | |
| Shawna Robinson | United States | November 20, 1964 (age 61) | | NASCAR Busch Series, NASCAR Winston Cup Series | |
| Isabella Robusto | United States | November 4, 2004 (age 21) | | CARS Late Model Stock Car Tour, ARCA Menards Series | |
| Angela Ruch | United States | August 18, 1983 (age 43) | | NASCAR Gander RV & Outdoors Truck Series, NASCAR Xfinity Series | |
| Kathy Rude | United States | 1975 (age 49–50) | | IMSA GT Championship | |
| Amy Ruman | United States | January 30, 1974 (age 52) | | Trans-Am Series | |
| Kenzie Ruston-Hemric | United States | October 12, 1991 (age 35) | | NASCAR K&N Pro Series East | |
| Naomi Schiff | Rwanda | 18 May 1994 (age 32) | | Clio Cup China Series, 24 Hours of Nürburgring, W Series | |
| Sabine Schmitz | Germany | 14 May 1969 | 16 March 2021 (aged 51) | South African Touring Car Championship, 24 Hours of Nürburgring | |
| Carrie Schreiner | Germany | 14 September 1998 (age 28) | | Nürburgring Langstrecken-Serie, ADAC GT Masters, F1 Academy | |
| Cora Schumacher | Germany | 27 December 1976 (age 49) | | Mini Challenge Deutschland, SEAT León Supercopa, Dubai 24 Hour | |
| Jill Scott | England | 21 May 1903 | 1974 (aged 71–72) | Grand Prix motor racing | |
| Doreen Seidel | Germany | 19 September 1985 (age 41) | | Audi Sport TT Cup | |
| Sneha Sharma | India | 1 August 1990 (age 36) | | JK Tyre National Racing Championship, F4 South East Asia | |
| Caitlin Shaw | United States | August 28, 1989 (age 37) | | NASCAR Camping World Truck Series | |
| Rio Shimono | Japan | 25 May 2000 (age 26) | | Kyojo Cup, F4 Japanese Championship | |
| Irina Sidorkova | Russia | 27 June 2003 (age 23) | | W Series, Russian Circuit Racing Series | |
| Louise Smith | United States | July 31, 1916 | April 15, 2006 (aged 89) | NASCAR Grand National Series | |
| Karlīne Štāla | Latvia | 5 March 1986 (age 40) | | Formula Renault 1.6 Belgium, German Formula 3 Championship | |
| Patrīcija Stalidzāne | Latvia | 17 April 2002 (age 24) | | ADAC GT4 Germany, Nürburgring Langstrecken-Serie | |
| Bianca Steiner | Austria | 8 July 1990 (age 36) | | Formula Renault Eurocup, BOSS GP | |
| Mercedes Stermitz | Austria | 24 April 1958 (age 68) | | World Touring Car Championship, DTM, World Sportscar Championship | |
| Ella Stevens | England | 9 October 2006 (age 20) | | F1 Academy | |
| Madeline Stewart | New Zealand | 2 August 2000 (age 26) | | Porsche Carrera Cup Australia, Porsche Carrera Cup North America | |
| Aurora Straus | United States | September 17, 1998 (age 28) | | Mazda MX-5 Cup | |
| Lyn St. James | United States | March 13, 1947 (age 79) | | CART IndyCar World Series, 24 Hours of Le Mans | |
| Susie Stoddart | Scotland | 6 December 1982 (age 43) | | Formula Renault 2.0 UK, British Formula 3 International Series, DTM | |
| Amanda Stretton | England | 24 July 1973 (age 53) | | ASCAR, 24 Hours of Le Mans | |
| Christina Surer | Switzerland | 26 March 1974 (age 52) | | 24 Hours of Nürburgring, SEAT León Supercopa | |
| Kelly Sutton | United States | September 24, 1971 (age 55) | | NASCAR Goody's Dash Series, NASCAR Craftsman Truck Series | |
| Ann Tahincioğlu | Turkey | 1956 (age 68–69) | | Turkish Track Championship, VW Polo Cup Turkey | |
| Inès Taittinger | France | 7 April 1990 (age 36) | | V de V Challenge Monoplace, 24 Hours of Le Mans | |
| Samantha Tan | Canada | August 9, 1997 (age 29) | | GT World Challenge, 24H Series | |
| Ashley Taws | Canada | November 1, 1983 (age 42) | | NASCAR Canadian Tire Series | |
| Kathryn Teasdale | Canada | December 25, 1964 | June 2, 2016 (aged 51) | NASCAR Busch Series, Indy Lights | |
| Diane Teel | United States | February 16, 1948 (age 78) | | NASCAR Busch Series | |
| Lisa Thackwell | New Zealand | 1964 or 1965 (age 59–60) | | Honda CRX Challenge | |
| Muriel Thompson | Scotland | 10 June 1875 | 3 March 1939 (aged 63) | Grand Prix motor racing | |
| Bruna Tomaselli | Brazil | 18 September 1997 (age 29) | | U.S. F2000 National Championship, W Series, Stock Light | |
| Riona Tomishita | Japan | 5 June 2006 (age 20) | | Kyojo Cup | |
| Laura van den Hengel | Netherlands | 27 February 1991 (age 35) | | GT Cup Open Europe | |
| Shirley van der Lof | Netherlands | 7 November 1986 (age 39) | | German Formula 3 Championship | |
| Dominique van Wieringen | Canada | June 22, 1995 (age 31) | | NASCAR Camping World Truck Series, NASCAR K&N Pro Series East | |
| Hélène van Zuylen | France | 21 August 1863 | 17 October 1947 (aged 84) | Paris–Amsterdam–Paris | |
| Alexandra Vateva | Bulgaria | 23 February 2004 (age 22) | | Porsche Carrera Cup Benelux | |
| Tamara Vidali | Italy | 18 February 1966 (age 60) | | Italian Superturismo Championship, Super Tourenwagen Cup | |
| Josefina Vigo | Argentina | 24 June 1994 (age 32) | | Top Race Series, GT 2000 | |
| Beitske Visser | Netherlands | 10 March 1995 (age 31) | | Formula Renault 3.5, W Series, FIA World Endurance Championship | |
| Margot von Gans | Germany | 11 July 1899 | 1986 (aged 86–87) | Targa Florio | |
| Lilou Wadoux | France | 10 April 2001 (age 25) | | FIA World Endurance Championship, IMSA SportsCar Championship | |
| Christina Wallace | United States | May 15, 1988 (age 38) | | NASCAR Camping World Truck Series, NASCAR Nationwide Series | |
| Zoë Wenham | England | 7 May 1994 (age 32) | | British GT Championship | |
| Payton Westcott | United States | March 20, 2009 (age 17) | | F1 Academy | |
| Maya Weug | Netherlands | 1 June 2004 (age 22) | | Formula Regional European Championship, F1 Academy | |
| Midge Whiteman | Australia | unknown | unknown | Bathurst 500 | |
| Desiré Wilson | South Africa | 26 November 1953 (age 72) | | Formula One, World Sportscar Championship, CART World Series | |
| Fabienne Wohlwend | Liechtenstein | 7 November 1997 (age 28) | | Ferrari Challenge, W Series, Nürburgring Langstrecken-Serie | |
| Caitlin Wood | Australia | 15 January 1997 (age 29) | | Blancpain GT Series, W Series | |
| Ka-yi Yeung | Hong Kong | 1982 (age 42–43) | | Asian Touring Car Series, Kyojo Cup | |
| Brittney Zamora | United States | April 27, 1999 (age 27) | | ARCA Menards Series West | |
| Ianina Zanazzi | Argentina | 7 January 1982 (age 44) | | Formula 3 Sudamericana | |

== Motorcycle racing ==
| Name | Nationality | Date of birth | Date of death | Notable championships / competitions | Ref |
|---|---|---|---|---|---|
| Emily Bondi | France | 14 April 2001 (age 25) | | FIM Women's Circuit Racing World Championship | |
| Avalon Biddle | New Zealand | 21 September 1992 (age 34) | | Moto3 World Championship, Supersport 300 World Championship | |
| Ana Carrasco | Spain | 10 March 1997 (age 29) | | Moto3 World Championship, Supersport 300 World Championship | |
| Nichole Cheza | United States | June 11, 1987 (age 39) | | AMA Grand National Championship | |
| Maria Costello | England | 9 June 1973 (age 53) | | Isle of Man TT | |
| Joi Harris | United States | December 11, 1976 | August 14, 2017 (aged 40) | Championship Cup Series | |
| María Herrera | Spain | 26 August 1996 (age 30) | | FIM Women's Circuit Racing World Championship | |
| Luna Hirano | Japan | 19 October 1999 (age 27) | | FIM Women's Circuit Racing World Championship | |
| Tomoko Igata | Japan | 30 October 1965 (age 60) | | 125cc World Championship | |
| Nikolett Kovács | Hungary | 30 August 1982 (age 44) | | 125cc World Championship | |
| Anastassia Kovalenko | Estonia | 21 September 1991 (age 35) | | European Junior Cup | |
| Elena Myers | United States | November 21, 1993 (age 32) | | AMA Supersport Championship | |
| Stacey Nesbitt | Canada | March 10, 1997 (age 29) | | Canadian Superbike Championship, AMA Supersport Championship | |
| Shizuka Okazaki | Japan | 12 June 1992 (age 34) | | Moto3 World Championship | |
| Ornella Ongaro | France | 16 October 1990 (age 36) | | FIM Women's Circuit Racing World Championship | |
| Katja Pönsgen | Germany | 23 September 1976 (age 50) | | European Superstock 1000 Championship, 250cc World Championship | |
| Roberta Ponziani | Italy | August 4, 1996 (age 30) | | FIM Women's Circuit Racing World Championship | |
| Leslie Porterfield | United States | April 16, 1976 (age 50) | | Land-speed record holder | |
| Nina Prinz | Germany | 5 November 1982 (age 43) | | Moto2 World Championship | |
| Chithra Priya | India | 30 March 1984 (age 42) | | Saddlesore Rally | |
| Taru Rinne | Finland | 27 August 1968 (age 58) | | 125cc World Championship | |
| Elena Rosell | Spain | 30 April 1986 (age 40) | | Moto2 World Championship | |
| Carolynn Sells | England | 7 May 1973 (age 53) | | Manx Grand Prix | |
| Beryl Swain | England | 22 January 1936 | 15 May 2007 (aged 71) | 50cc World Championsip, Isle of Man TT | |
| Jenny Tinmouth | England | 8 March 1978 (age 48) | | British Superbike Championship, Isle of Man TT | |
| Andrea Toušková | Czech Republic | 26 September 1992 (age 34) | | 125cc World Championship | |

== Motocross ==
| Name | Nationality | Date of birth | Date of death | Notable championships / competitions | Ref |
|---|---|---|---|---|---|
| Stefy Bau | Italy | 17 February 1977 | | AMA Motocross Championship | |
| Ashley Fiolek | United States | October 22, 1990 (age 36) | | AMA Motocross Championship | |
| Sue Fish | United States | November 9, 1958 (age 67) | | AMA Motocross Championship | |
| Kiara Fontanesi | Italy | 10 March 1994 (age 32) | | Motocross World Championship | |
| Tarah Gieger | Puerto Rico | September 18, 1985 (age 41) | | AMA Motocross Championship | |
| Vicki Golden | United States | July 28, 1992 (age 34) | | X Games | |
| Mercedes González | Spain | 11 July 1963 (age 63) | | AMA Motocross Championship | |
| Stephanie Laier | Germany | 12 August 1985 (age 41) | | FIM Women's Motocross World Championship | |
| Livia Lancelot | France | 11 February 1988 (age 38) | | FIM Women's Motocross World Championship | |
| Tanyaradzwa Muzinda | Zimbabwe | 31 August 2004 (age 22) | | British Master Kids Championships | |
| Noora Naraghi | Iran | 30 May 1988 (age 38) | | Iranian Motocross Championship | |
| Larissa Papenmeier | Germany | 27 January 1990 (age 36) | | FIM Women's Motocross World Championship | |
| Jessica Patterson | United States | September 14, 1983 (age 43) | | AMA Motocross Championship | |
| Selen Tınaz | Turkey | 2008 (age 16–17) | | Turkish Motocross Championships | |
| Lynn Valk | Netherlands | 18 October 2002 (age 24) | | FIM Women's Motocross World Championship | |
| Nancy van de Ven | Netherlands | 13 November 1997 (age 28) | | FIM Women's Motocross World Championship | |
| Jolene van Vugt | Canada | September 17, 1980 (age 46) | | Canadian Motorsport Racing Club | |
| Irmak Yıldırım | Turkey | 2005 (age 19–20) | | FIM Women's Motocross World Championship | |

== Multi-discipline and other ==
| Name | Nationality | Date of birth | Date of death | Disciplines | Ref |
|---|---|---|---|---|---|
| Mikaela Åhlin-Kottulinsky | Sweden | 13 November 1992 (age 33) | | Car racing, rally-raid | |
| Louise Aitken-Walker | Scotland | 21 January 1960 (age 66) | | Car racing, rallying | |
| Aseel Al Hamad | Saudi Arabia | unknown | | Formula One demonstration driver | |
| Margaret Allan | Scotland | 26 July 1909 | 21 September 1998 (aged 89) | Car racing, hillclimb, rallying | |
| Klara Andersson | Sweden | 29 February 2000 (age 26) | | Rallycross, rally-raid | |
| Magda Andersson | Sweden | 14 July 1998 (age 28) | | Rallycross | |
| Jade Avedisian | United States | September 14, 2006 (age 20) | | Dirt track racing, car racing | |
| Theresa Bauml | Germany | 27 October 1997 (age 28) | | Motorcycle trials | |
| Anne Baverey | France | 25 May 1946 (age 80) | | Hillclimb, car racing | |
| Christine Beckers | Belgium | 3 December 1943 (age 82) | | Rallying, car racing | |
| Martha Beindorff | West Germany | 21 February 1903 | 9 November 2007 (aged 104) | Car racing, rallying | |
| Lia Block | United States | October 1, 2006 (age 20) | | Rallying, car racing | |
| Emma Bristow | England | 29 October 1990 (age 35) | | Motorcycle trials | |
| Kaylee Bryson | United States | March 11, 2001 (age 25) | | Dirt track racing, car racing | |
| Letícia Bufoni | Brazil | April 13, 1993 (age 33) | | Rallycross, off-road racing, car racing | |
| Carol Burkett | United States | May 29, 1945 | April 4, 2020 (aged 74) | Drag racing | |
| Patsy Burt | England | 10 July 1928 | 4 October 2001 (aged 73) | Car racing, hillclimb | |
| Gloria Castresana | Spain | 15 August 1940 (age 86) | | Car racing, rallying | |
| Jamie Chadwick | England | 20 May 1998 (age 28) | | Car racing, rally-raid | |
| Marie-Claude Charmasson | France | 17 September 1941 (age 85) | | Rallying, car racing | |
| Lyweoi Chin | Malaysia | 23 July 1986 (age 40) | | Drifting | |
| Joanne Coles | England | 25 June 1992 (age 34) | | Motorcycle trials | |
| Rebekah Cook | England | 3 August 1986 (age 40) | | Motorcycle trials | |
| Marjorie Cottle | England | 5 September 1900 | 17 July 1987 (aged 86) | Motorcycle trials | |
| Christine Dacremont | France | 6 January 1949 (age 77) | | Rallying, car racing | |
| Betty Debenham | England | 1895 | unknown | Motorcycle trials | |
| Nancy Debenham | England | 1897 | unknown | Motorcycle trials | |
| Hailie Deegan | United States | July 18, 2001 (age 25) | | Off-road racing, car racing | |
| Alexis DeJoria | United States | September 24, 1977 (age 49) | | Drag racing | |
| Osmunde Dolischka | Austria | 13 January 1973 (age 53) | | Car racing, rallying | |
| Sarah Duke | United States | October 28, 1987 (age 38) | | Motorcycle trials | |
| Courtney Enders | United States | November 14, 1986 (age 39) | | Drag racing | |
| Erica Enders | United States | October 8, 1983 (age 43) | | Drag racing | |
| Marlene Gulbæk Engan | Norway | 10 May 1987 (age 39) | | Rallying, rallycross | |
| Debbie Evans | United States | February 5, 1958 (age 68) | | Motorcycle trials | |
| Taylor Ferns | United States | December 12, 1995 (age 30) | | Car racing, dirt-track racing | |
| Yvette Fontaine | Belgium | 3 June 1946 (age 80) | | Rallying, car racing | |
| Ashley Force-Hood | United States | November 29, 1982 (age 43) | | Drag racing | |
| Brittany Force | United States | July 8, 1986 (age 40) | | Drag racing | |
| Courtney Force-Rahal | United States | June 20, 1988 (age 38) | | Drag racing | |
| Louise Forsley | United States | June 7, 1988 (age 38) | | Motorcycle trials | |
| Donna Fox | England | 22 October 1984 (age 42) | | Motorcycle trials | |
| Mendy Fry | United States | May 24, 1969 (age 57) | | Drag racing | |
| Christine Giampaoli Zonca | Spain | 22 July 1993 (age 33) | | Rallying, rally-raid | |
| Emma Gilmour | New Zealand | 30 September 1979 (age 47) | | Rallycross, rally-raid | |
| Cheryl Glass | United States | December 24, 1961 | July 15, 1997 (aged 35) | Dirt-track racing, car racing | |
| Stephanie Halm | Germany | 9 July 1984 (age 42) | | Car racing, truck racing | |
| Gwenda Hawkes | England | 1 June 1894 | 27 May 1990 (aged 95) | Car racing, motorcycle racing | |
| Heidi Hetzer | West Germany | 20 June 1937 | 21 April 2019 (aged 81) | Car racing, rallying | |
| Marianne Hoepfner | France | 7 April 1944 (age 82) | | Rallying, car racing | |
| Anne-Cécile Itier | France | 31 July 1890 | 23 March 1980 (aged 89) | Rallying, hillclimb, car racing | |
| Lori Johns | United States | 1965 (age 59–60) | | Drag racing | |
| Ramona Karlsson | Sweden | 8 January 1981 (age 45) | | Rallying, rallycross | |
| Olga Kevelos | England | 6 November 1923 | 28 October 2009 (aged 85) | Motorcycle trials | |
| Tammy Jo Kirk | United States | May 6, 1962 (age 64) | | Car racing, motorcycle racing | |
| Aliyyah Koloc | United Arab Emirates | 1 July 2004 (age 22) | | Rally-raid, car racing, truck racing | |
| Iris Kramer | Germany | 22 June 1981 (age 45) | | Motorcycle trials | |
| Sophie Kumpen | Belgium | 30 October 1975 (age 50) | | Karting | |
| Margot Laffite | France | 6 November 1980 (age 45) | | Ice racing | |
| Roberta Leighton | United States | April 27, 1932 | November 15, 2002 (aged 70) | Drag racing | |
| Peggy Llewellyn | United States | December 26, 1972 (age 53) | | Drag racing | |
| Ellen Lohr | Germany | 12 April 1965 (age 61) | | Car racing, rallying, rally-raid | |
| Anita Mäkelä | Finland | January 12, 1961 (age 65) | | Drag racing | |
| Veronica McCann | Australia | 24 August 1983 (age 43) | | Speedway, car racing | |
| Mary McGee | United States | December 12, 1937 | November 27, 2024 (aged 86) | Car racing, motorcycle racing, motocross | |
| Tamara Molinaro | Italy | 10 October 1997 (age 29) | | Rallying, rally-raid | |
| Violette Morris | France | 18 April 1893 | 26 April 1944 (aged 51) | Car racing, motorcycle racing | |
| Michèle Mouton | France | 23 June 1951 | | Car racing, rallying | |
| Shirley Muldowney | United States | June 19, 1940 (age 86) | | Drag racing | |
| Catie Munnings | England | 15 November 1997 (age 28) | | Rallying, rally-raid | |
| Paula Murphy | United States | June 16, 1928 (age 98) | December 21, 2023 (aged 96) | Car racing, drag racing, land speed records | |
| Hellé Nice | France | 15 December 1900 | 1 October 1984 (aged 83) | Car racing, dirt track racing, rallying | |
| Terri O'Connell | United States | July 7, 1964 (age 62) | | Dirt-track racing, car racing | |
| Kitty O'Neil | United States | March 24, 1946 | November 2, 2018 (aged 72) | Off-road racing, land-speed record | |
| Marie-Pierre Palayer | France | 11 November 1950 (age 75) | | Rallying, rally-raid, car racing | |
| Sara Price | United States | September 2, 1992 (age 34) | | Motocross, rallying, rally-raid | |
| Leah Pruett | United States | May 26, 1988 (age 38) | | Drag racing | |
| Corentine Quiniou | France | 16 May 1982 (age 44) | | Rallying, car racing | |
| Stephanie Reaves | United States | February 24, 1967 (age 59) | | Drag racing, hillclimb | |
| Taylor Reimer | United States | December 2, 1999 (age 26) | | Dirt-track racing, car racing | |
| Joan Richmond | Australia | 1905 | 1999 (aged 93–94) | Car racing, rallying | |
| Débora Rodrigues | Brazil | 23 May 1968 (age 58) | | Truck racing | |
| Liliane Röhrs | Germany | 17 March 1900 | 7 September 1975 (aged 75) | Car racing, rallying | |
| Angelle Sampey | United States | August 7, 1970 (age 56) | | Drag racing | |
| Adeline Sangnier | France | 10 June 1986 (age 40) | | Rallycross | |
| Laia Sanz | Spain | 11 December 1985 (age 40) | | Motorcycle trials, car racing, rally-raid | |
| Natalie Sather | United States | March 12, 1985 (age 41) | | Dirt-track racing, car racing | |
| Laleh Seddigh | Iran | February 1977 | | Rallying, car racing | |
| Annie Seel | Sweden | 5 September 1968 (age 58) | | Rally-raid, motorcycle racing | |
| Odette Siko | France | 14 July 1899 | 31 August 1984 (aged 85) | Rallying, car racing | |
| Yvonne Simon | France | 6 December 1910 | 16 August 1992 (aged 81) | Rallying, car racing | |
| Lynsi Snyder | United States | May 5, 1982 (age 44) | | Drag racing | |
| Julie Stepan | United States | March 30, 1986 (age 40) | | Drag racing | |
| Helga Steudel | East Germany | 4 May 1939 (age 87) | | Motorcycle racing, hillclimb | |
| Inge Stoll | West Germany | 11 February 1930 | 24 August 1958 (aged 28) | Motorcycle racing, sidecar racing | |
| Molly Taylor | Australia | 6 May 1988 (age 38) | | Rallying, car racing, rally-raid | |
| Fay Taylour | Ireland | 5 April 1904 | 2 August 1983 (aged 79) | Motorcycle racing, speedway | |
| Gilberte Thirion | Belgium | 8 January 1928 | 21 May 2008 (aged 80) | Rallying, car racing | |
| Valerie Thompson | United States | April 17, 1967 (age 59) | | Drag racing | |
| Ilse Thouret | Germany | 19 August 1897 | 19 January 1969 (aged 71) | Car racing, motorcycle racing | |
| Miranda Throckmorton | United States | January 14, 1992 (age 34) | | Dirt-track racing | |
| Sara Trentini | Italy | 24 June 1991 (age 35) | | Motorcycle trials | |
| Melanie Troxel | United States | August 31, 1972 (age 54) | | Drag racing | |
| Anny-Charlotte Verney | France | 17 May 1943 (age 83) | | Car racing, rally-raid | |
| Maxine Wahome | Kenya | 21 December 1997 (age 28) | | Motocross, rallying | |
| Hannelore Werner | West Germany | 17 January 1942 (age 84) | | Car racing, rallying | |
| Ina Wilde | Germany | 8 March 1990 (age 36) | | Motorcycle trials | |
| Christy Williams | Canada | August 14, 1980 (age 46) | | Motorcycle trials | |
| Della Woods | United States | 1940 (age 84–85) | | Drag racing | |
| Ida Zetterström | Sweden | May 2, 1994 (age 32) | | Drag racing | |

== Rally ==
| Name | Nationality | Date of birth | Date of death | Notable championships / competitions | Ref |
|---|---|---|---|---|---|
| Pat Appleyard | England | 23 April 1927 | 11 October 2025 (aged 98) | various British rallies | |
| Isabelle Barciulli | Italy | 21 April 1986 (age 40) | | FIA Alternative Energies Cup | |
| Natalie Barratt | England | 6 March 1975 (age 51) | | British Rally Championship | |
| Patricia Bertapelle | France | 12 August 1963 (age 63) | | French Rally Championship | |
| Charlotte Berton | France | 24 August 1983 (age 43) | | French Rally Championship | |
| Claudine Bouchet | France | 28 November 1931 (age 94) | | French Rally Championship | |
| Burcu Çetinkaya | Turkey | 19 March 1981 (age 45) | | Istanbul Rally Championship, Qatar National Rally Championship | |
| Louise Cook | England | 14 May 1987 (age 39) | | British Rally Championship, World Rally Championship | |
| Nadia Cutro | Argentina | 14 February 1986 (age 40) | | Argentine Rally Championship | |
| Charlotte Dalmasso | France | 15 October 1991 (age 35) | | French Rally Championship | |
| Élisabeth de Fresquet | France | 16 June 1949 (age 77) | | French Rally Championship | |
| Janina Depping | Germany | 25 September 1978 | 14 August 2013 (aged 34) | Deutsche Rallye Meisterschaft | |
| Christine Driano | France | 10 March 1961 (age 65) | | French Rally Championship | |
| Magdeleine Goüin | France | 2 March 1901 | 30 June 1949 (aged 48) | Rallye Paris – Saint-Raphaël Féminin | |
| Isolde Holderied | Germany | 7 November 1966 (age 59) | | World Rally Championship | |
| Pauline Mayman | England | 26 May 1928 | 1989 (aged 60–61) | Coupe des Alpes | |
| Sally Miall | England | 18 December 1918 | 6 October 2010 (aged 91) | various European rallies | |
| Pat Moss | England | 27 December 1934 | 14 October 2008 (aged 73) | World Rally Championship | |
| Desara Muriqi | Albania | 27 May 1985 (age 41) | | FIA Alternative Energies Cup | |
| Pascale Neyret | France | 18 February 1961 (age 65) | | French Rally Championship | |
| Patricia Ozanne | Guernsey | 31 July 1923 | 11 February 2009 (aged 85) | London–Mexico City World Cup Rally | |
| Fabrizia Pons | Italy | 26 June 1955 (age 71) | | World Rally Championship (co-driver) | |
| Rosemary Smith | Ireland | 7 August 1937 | 5 December 2023 (aged 86) | European Rally Championship, London–Sydney Marathon | |
| Ekaterina Stratieva | Bulgaria | 5 October 1982 (age 44) | | European Rally Championship | |
| Inessa Tushkanova | Ukraine | 17 July 1987 (age 39) | | Finnish Rally Championship | |
| Sheila van Damm | England | 17 January 1922 | 23 August 1987 (aged 65) | various European rallies | |
| Annie Wambergue | France | 6 January 1938 | 23 December 2021 (aged 83) | French Rally Championship | |

== Rally-raid ==
| Name | Nationality | Date of birth | Date of death | Notable championships / competitions | Ref |
|---|---|---|---|---|---|
| Dania Akeel | Saudi Arabia | 26 September 1988 (age 38) | | Dakar Rally (SXS), World Rally-Raid Championship | |
| Jess Gardiner | Australia | 21 March 1993 (age 33) | | Australian Off Road Championship (bikes), International Six Days Enduro | |
| Cristina Gutiérrez | Spain | 24 July 1991 (age 35) | | Extreme E, World Rally-Raid Championship | |
| Hedda Hosås | Norway | 2 March 2001 (age 25) | | Extreme E | |
| Elisabete Jacinto | Portugal | 8 June 1964 (age 62) | | Dakar Rally (bikes) | |
| Jutta Kleinschmidt | Germany | 29 August 1962 (age 64) | | Dakar Rally (cars), Extreme E | |
| Joana Lemos | Portugal | 24 April 1972 (age 54) | | Dakar Rally (cars and bikes) | |
| Margot Llobera | Andorra | 18 May 1996 (age 30) | | FIM Bajas World Cup (bikes), Dakar Rally (SXS) | |
| Isabelle Patissier | France | 1 March 1967 (age 59) | | Dakar Rally (cars), Rallye Aicha des Gazelles | |
| Mirjam Pol | Netherlands | 3 June 1983 (age 43) | | Dakar Rally (cars and bikes) | |
| Alicia Reina | Argentina | 15 October 1973 (age 53) | | Dakar Rally (cars) | |
| Joana Sotto-Mayor | Portugal | 3 March 1973 (age 53) | | Portuguese All-Terrain Championship (cars) | |
| Patricia Watson-Miller | Germany | 20 July 1965 (age 61) | | Dakar Rally (bikes) | |

== See also ==
- Women in motorsport
- List of female Formula One drivers
- List of female Indy 500 drivers
- List of female NASCAR drivers
- List of female 24 Hours of Le Mans drivers
- List of female Bathurst 1000 drivers
