= Pro Stock Motorcycle =

Competition class in drag racing

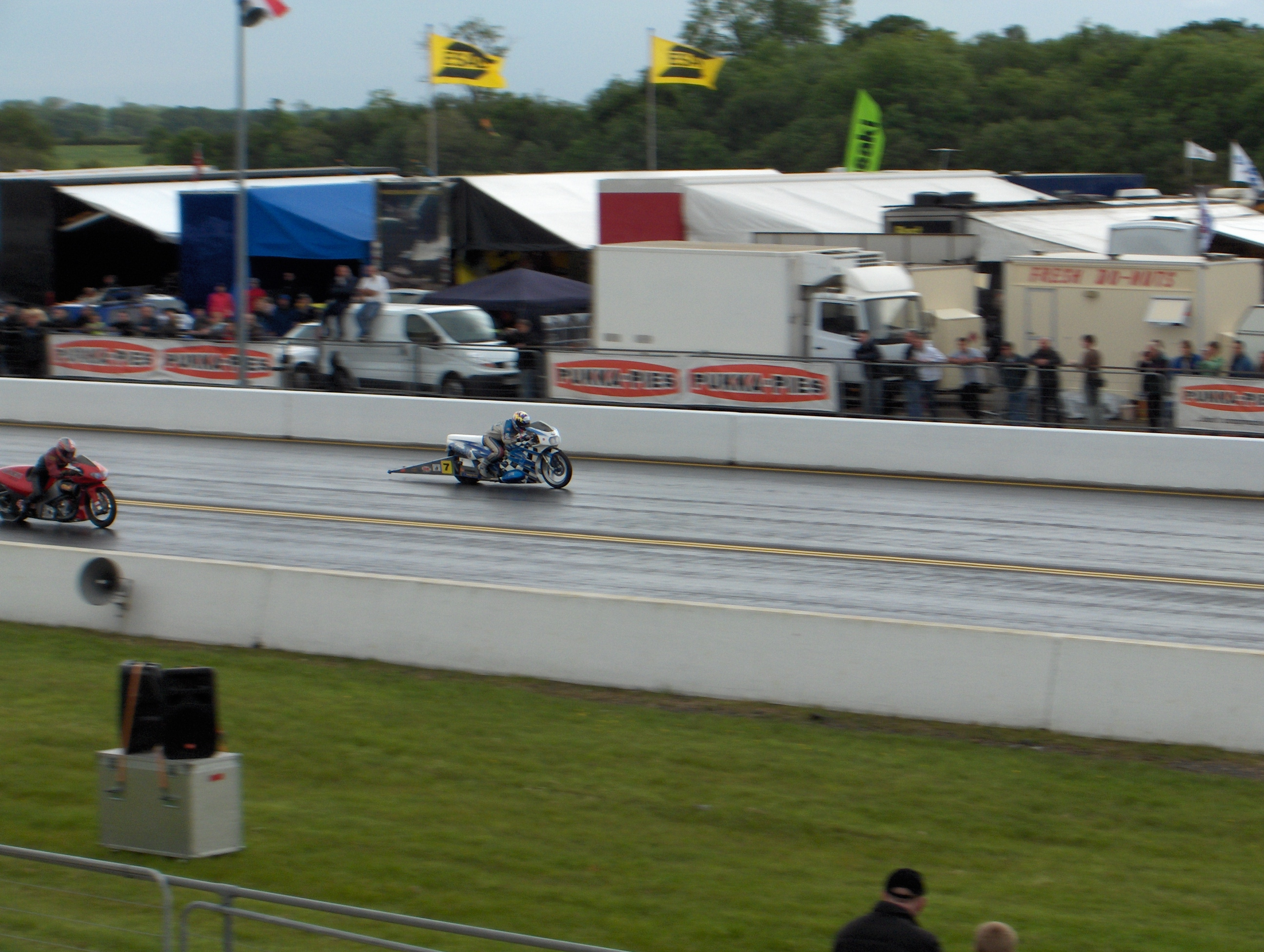
Pro Stock Motorcycles at Santa Pod

Pro Stock Motorcycle, formerly known as Pro Stock Bike, is a motorcycle drag racing class that is the two-wheeled equivalent of Pro Stock. It has been a feature of NHRA drag racing since the 1980s when it was added to the professional class structure and has since spread around the globe. The first points championship season was the 1987 NHRA season. Frames are purpose-built specifically for drag racing and are not based on their road-going counterparts.

One of the most successful Pro Stock Motorcycle drivers in NHRA history was six-time champion Dave Schultz, who died in 2001. The first female driver in this category is Vicki Farr; the first officially licensed driver is Stephanie Reaves, as well as first to qualify at a NHRA National Event, and the best known female face in this category is Angelle Sampey (Seeling), who set a national record 7.38 second elapsed time in 1996, during her rookie year.

John Myers was one of the most dominant and legendary riders in the sport. He amassed 33 NHRA event wins before his death in 1998.

The category was mostly dominated by Suzuki GS powered machines until the introduction of the Buell and the Harley-Davidson V-Rod. The V-Rod debuted in 2002 and the Buell debuted in 2003.

From 2004 to 2012, the Vance and Hines V-Rod was arguably the most dominant motorcycle in the class. Andrew Hines won three championships and Ed Krawiec won two, utilizing the V-Rod.

Suzuki and Buell team owner George Bryce was an outspoken critic of the V-Rod's set of rules.

In 2013, the NHRA made a rule change to limit the V-Rods.

== Most NHRA Pro Stock Motorcycle wins ==
Driver	Wins
Andrew Hines	56
Eddie Krawiec	49
Angelle Sampey	46
Matt Smith	46
Dave Schultz	45
John Myers	33
Gaige Herrera	33
Matt Hines	30
Terry Vance	21
LE Tonglet	20
Hector Arana Jr	19
Antron Brown	16
Craig Treble	14
Jerry Savoie	14
Steve Johnson	12
Karen Stoffer	11
Richard Gadson	7
Hector Arana Sr	7
Chip Ellis	7
Michael Phillips	7
John Mafaro	6
John Hall	5
Shawn Gann	5
John Smith	4
Geno Scali	4
Ryan Schnitz	4
Matt Guidera	4
Chris Rivas	4
Angie Smith	4
Joey Gladstone	3
GT Tonglet	3
Rick Stetson	3
Ryan Oehler	2
Scotty Pollacheck	2
Michael Ray	2
Reggie Showers	2
Tony Mullin	2
Jim Bernard	2
Ron Ayers	1
Byron Hines	1
Rick Ward	1
Paul Gast	1
Russ Nyberg	1
Blaine Hale	1
Fred Collis	1
Chase Van Sant	1
Jianna Evaristo	1
Peggy Llewellyn	1

== See also ==
- Motorcycle drag racing
