= Andrew Hines =

American motorcycle racer

- Born: May 25, 1983 (age 43) Villa Park, California, U.S.

NHRA Camping World Drag Racing Series
- Years active: 2000-2021
- Teams: Vance & Hines
- Championships: 6 (PSM)
- Wins: 56

Championship titles
- 2004, 2005, 2006, 2014, 2015, 2019: NHRA Pro Stock Motorcycle Champion
- Statistics up to date as of September 16, 2025.

Andrew Hines (born May 25, 1983, in Villa Park, California) is an American former National Hot Rod Association drag racer and six-time Pro Stock Motorcycle champion. He rode for Screamin' Eagle/Vance & Hines on a Harley-Davidson V-rod. Hines followed in the footsteps of his brother and crew chief, Matt Hines (NHRA PSM Champion 1997, 97, 99). The team is headed by the legendary duo of Terry Vance and Byron Hines. Hines was inducted into the Motorsports Hall of Fame of America in 2022.

== Career statistics ==
=== 2014 ===
- Secured his fourth world championship during the season ending event in Pomona
- raced to six wins
- posted two runner-up finishes during the year
- won the inaugural MiraMonte Records Pro Bike Battle in Sonoma

=== 2013 ===
- Raced to only victory of the season at Charlotte 2
- Posted a semifinal finish at Denver
- Qualified a season-best third at Houston
- Finished outside top 10 points standings for only second time in his career

=== 2012 ===
- Had career-best season with six wins in 11 final round appearances
- finished second in championship points standings

=== 2011 ===
- Set his career-best E.T. and speed
- Won the Indianapolis and Pomona 2 rounds
- Finished third in the championship points standings

=== 2010 ===
- Won five races, tying his career best wins in a season
- Raced to seven consecutive final-round appearances with three wins and four runner-up finishes
- Made the Playoffs for the fourth consecutive season
- Set a career-best for elapsed time at Indianapolis
- Won multiple races for the seventh consecutive season

=== 2009 ===
- Was the No. 1 qualifier four times during the season
- Made the Playoffs for the third consecutive season
- Posted career best elapsed time at St. Louis
- Won multiple races for the sixth consecutive season

=== 2008 ===
- Went to the final round at three of the first four races with wins at Atlanta and St. Louis
- Led the point standings from Race 3 through Race 10
- Matched his second-best round-win total of 31
- Competed in his 100th career race

=== 2007 ===
- Earned an appearance in the inaugural Countdown to 4 and Countdown to 1
- Won a career best five of seven final round appearances
- Set his career best elapsed time

=== 2006 ===
- Earned his third world championship title
- Won three of five final round appearances
- Set career best elapsed time
- Won Ringer's Pro Bike Battle

=== 2005 ===
- Earned second consecutive world championship title
- Became first rider to run sub six seconds; Set national records for elapsed time (6.968 seconds) and speed (197.45 mph)
- Won two of five final round appearances
- Topped the qualifying fields at nine of 15 events

=== 2004 ===
- Won first career powerade world championship and first for Harley Davidson
- Led the point standings for the entire season
- Earned a category-best eight No. 1 qualifying positions
- Won three of four final-round appearances

=== 2003 ===
Was the runner-up at Sonoma, the first final round appearance of his career

=== 2002 ===
- Made professional debut at Denver
- Qualified for every event he entered
- Advanced to the semifinals at Reading, his fifth career race
- Finalist for the Auto Club Road to the Future award honoring the NHRA's Rookie of the Year
- Dated Rachel Prince from Denham Springs, LA

== Personal ==
- Wife: Tanya Joy
- Sons: Rion (8/24/00), Declan (7/28/2010)
- Daughter: Genevieve (4/2017)
- Height/weight: 6´0´´, 160 lbs.
- Hobbies: Scuba diving, hiking, go-kart racing
- Hometown: Avon, Indiana
