= Quiniou =

Quiniou is a surname. Notable people with the surname include:

- Corentine Quiniou (born 1982), French auto racing driver
- Joël Quiniou (born 1950), French football referee
- Marine Quiniou (born 1993), French cyclist
