= Noora Naraghi =

Iranian motorcycle racer

- Nationality: Iranian
- Born: 30 May 1988 (age 38) Tehran, Iran

Motocross career
- Years active: 2009; present
- Championships: 2009, Iran's first-ever female championship in motocross

Noora Naraghi (Persian: نورا نراقی; born 30 May 1988) is an Iranian motocross racer. She is the first women's Iran motocross champion. In 2009, she won Iran's first-ever female championship in motocross. She then had made headline news in Iran and worldwide. In 2010, she traveled to Tallahassee, Florida, USA to learn motocross from Stefy Bau, former women's world motocross champion, the elite worldwide motocross academy for women – so, CNN picked up the story. In 2010, she also raced in competitions sponsored by the American Motorcyclist Association.

== Early life ==
Naraghi was born in Tehran, Iran. She became interested in the sport after watching her father (Mehrshad Naraghi) compete in races. She began riding motorcycles at the age of four.

== Family ==
Naraghi's father, Mehrshad Naraghi, her mother, Shahrzad Nazifi, and her brother Meraat Naraghi are also motocross riders.

== Career ==
Naraghi won Iran's first-ever female championship in motocross, on 30 October 2009. She then traveled to Tallahassee, Florida, US (in 2010) to learn motocross from Stefy Bau, former women's world motocross champion, the elite worldwide motocross academy for women. In 2010, she also raced in competitions sponsored by the American Motorcyclist Association.
