= Peggy Llewellyn =

American motorcycle racer

Peggy Maria Llewellyn (born December 26, 1972, in San Antonio, Texas) is a National Hot Rod Association (NHRA) Pro Stock Motorcycle drag racer. She is of American, Mexican and Jamaican descent. Her father Gene Llewellyn was closely involved with bikes and bike racing and she began riding herself at age seven.

== Racing achievements ==
In 2001, Llewellyn raced six pro events. Without the sponsorship finance to continue, she left the sport and trained as a Real estate agent. It took five years to secure another sponsor and get back onto the circuit.

In 2007, Llewellyn became the first woman of color to win a professional motorsports event, carrying off the title at the NHRA POWERade Dallas event. This earned her an appearance in the inaugural Countdown to 4 and Countdown to 1, giving her a finish in the POWERade top-five in standings. She also posted her career-best time of 6.928 seconds and a speed of 193.24 mph.

In 2008, Llewellyn ran an abbreviated season, advancing to the semi-finals in Denver and finishing the season qualifying for five out of six races. Llewellyn made history once again in 2010 by becoming the first woman of color to own, operate and race for an NHRA professional drag racing team, 2 Wheel Woman Racing.

== Recognition and charity work ==
Llewellyn was named 2009 Female Athlete of the Year by The Elements of a Champion Foundation. In 2010 and 2011, Llewellyn was recognized by the Women’s Sports Foundation at the 32nd and 33rd Annual Salute to Women in Sports Gala in New York.

Llewellyn is involved with the Women’s Sports Foundation’s Go Girl Go! initiative and with independently promoting the sport of motorcycle racing, physical fitness education and young female athletes. She also supports Divas For A Cure, a national non-profit organization of Black and Hispanic/Latino American women who ride motorcycles across country throughout the year and organise the fundraising Divas For A Cure Breast Cancer Motorcycle Run in order to raise awareness and funds to combat breast cancer.

== External sources ==
- Peggy Llewellyn website
- Jamaicans.com interview
- Latina Style Magazine interview
