= Carol Burkett =

American drag racing driver (1945–2020)

- Nationality: American
- Born: May 29, 1945 Franklin, West Virginia, U.S.
- Died: April 4, 2020 (aged 74)

Alcohol Funny Car

Carolyn Burkett (May 29, 1945 – April 4, 2020), nicknamed "Bunny", was an American Alcohol Funny Car driver. In 1986, Burkett became only the second woman to win a national title in a professional class, following Shirley Muldowney.

== History ==
Burkett was one of only a small number of women drag racing in professional classes. She raced under both National Hot Rod Association (NHRA) and International Hot Rod Association (IHRA) sanctioning. She began racing in the 1960s, and in 1995 was still in the sport.

By winning the 1986 IHRA alcohol funny car (A/FC) national title, Burkett became only the second woman to win a national title in a professional class, following Shirley Muldowney.

In September 1995, Burkett was involved in a serious accident at Beaver Springs Dragway that threatened to end her racing career. Near the traps, Carl Ruth's funny car crossed the centerline into the left lane, pushing Burkett's into the guardrail.

Burkett got her nickname, "Bunny", because she had been a Playboy Club hostess.

Burkett died on April 4, 2020, of natural causes.

== Personal life ==
Burkett was married, with two daughters.
