= Rallye Aicha des Gazelles =

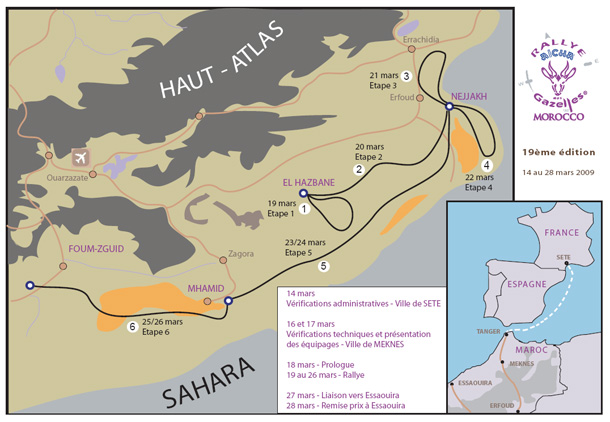
The route of the 2009 rally

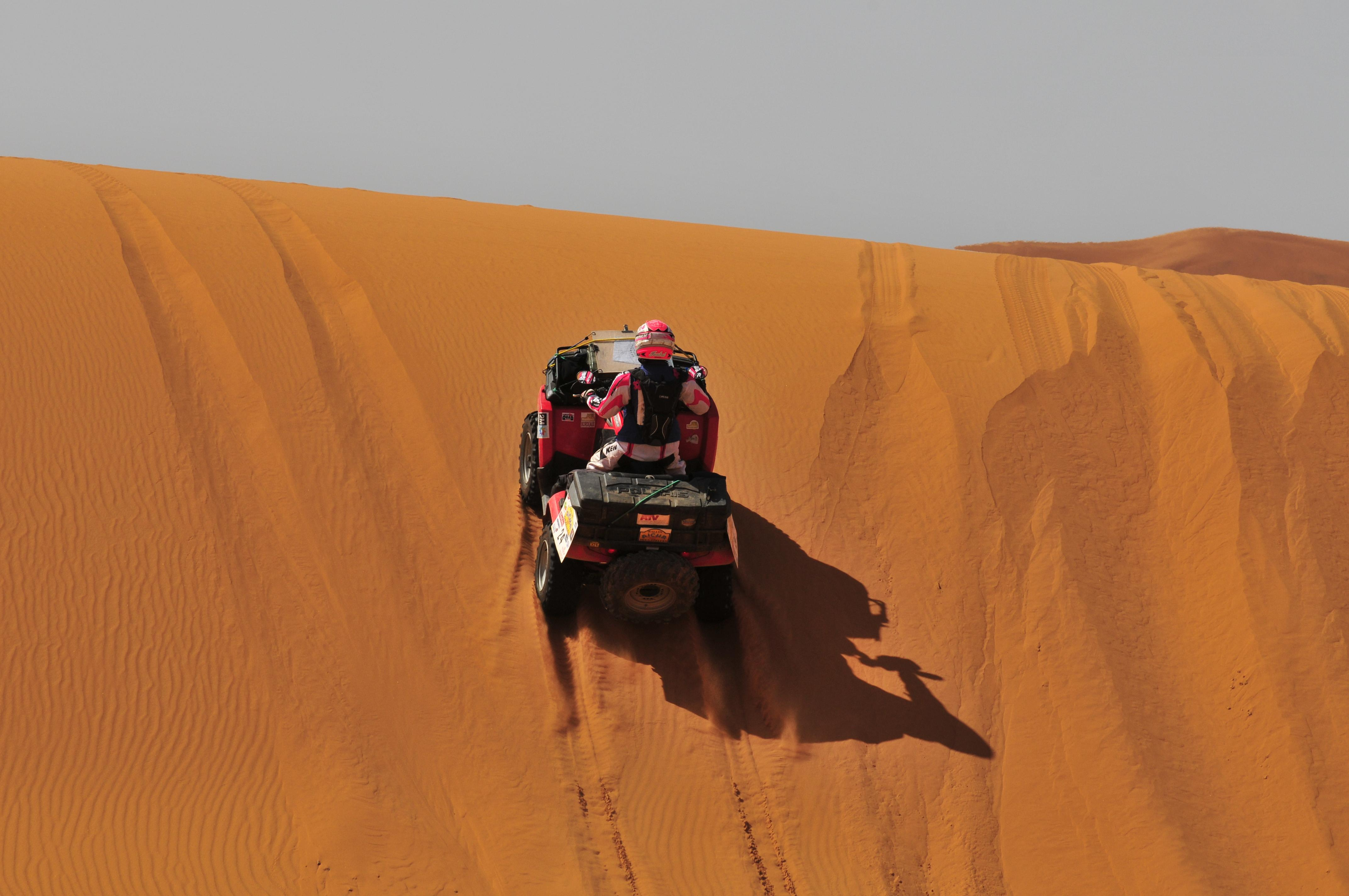
2009 winner of the Quad category: Team 24 climbing the dunes

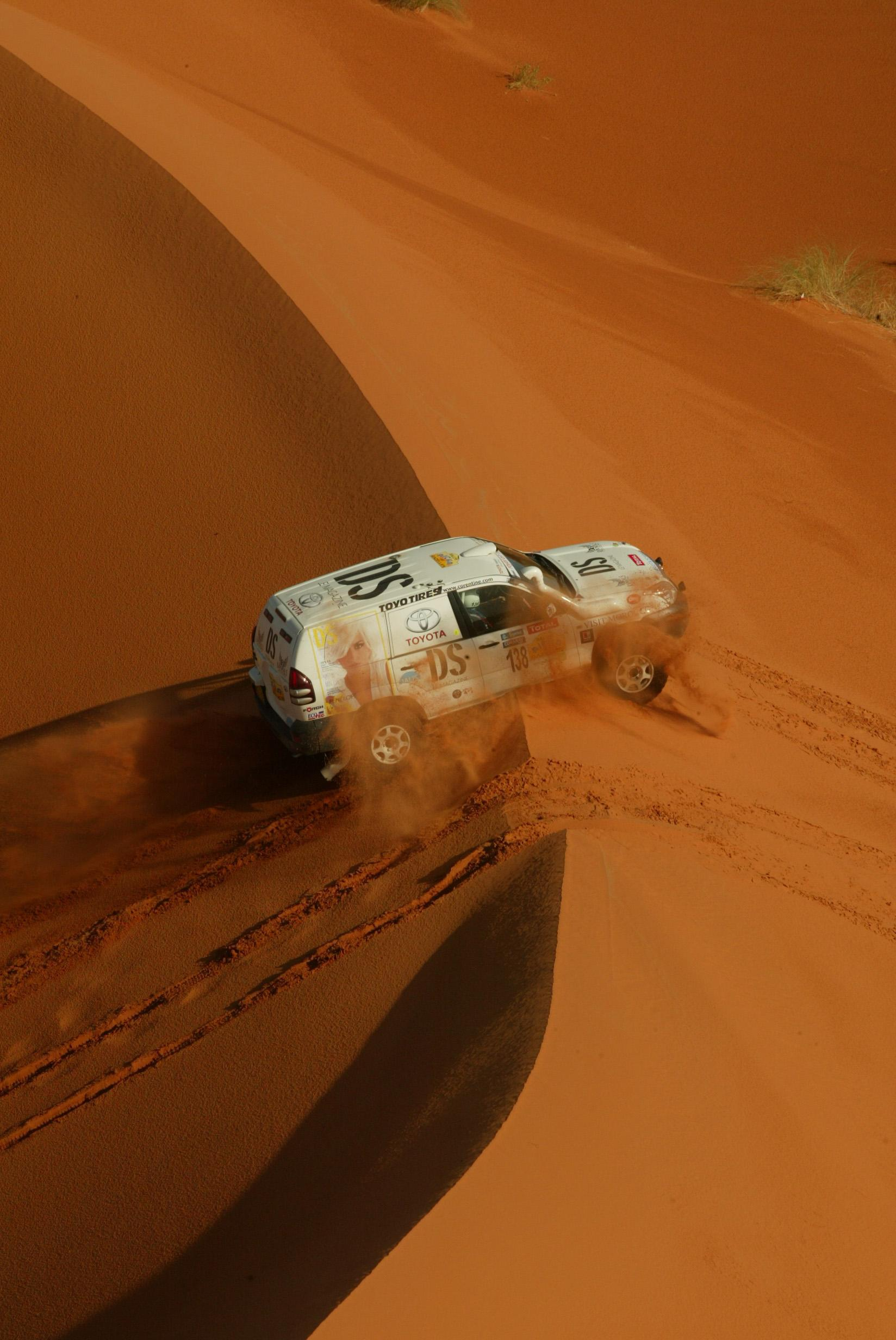
2009 winner of the 4x4 category: Team 138 jumping the dunes

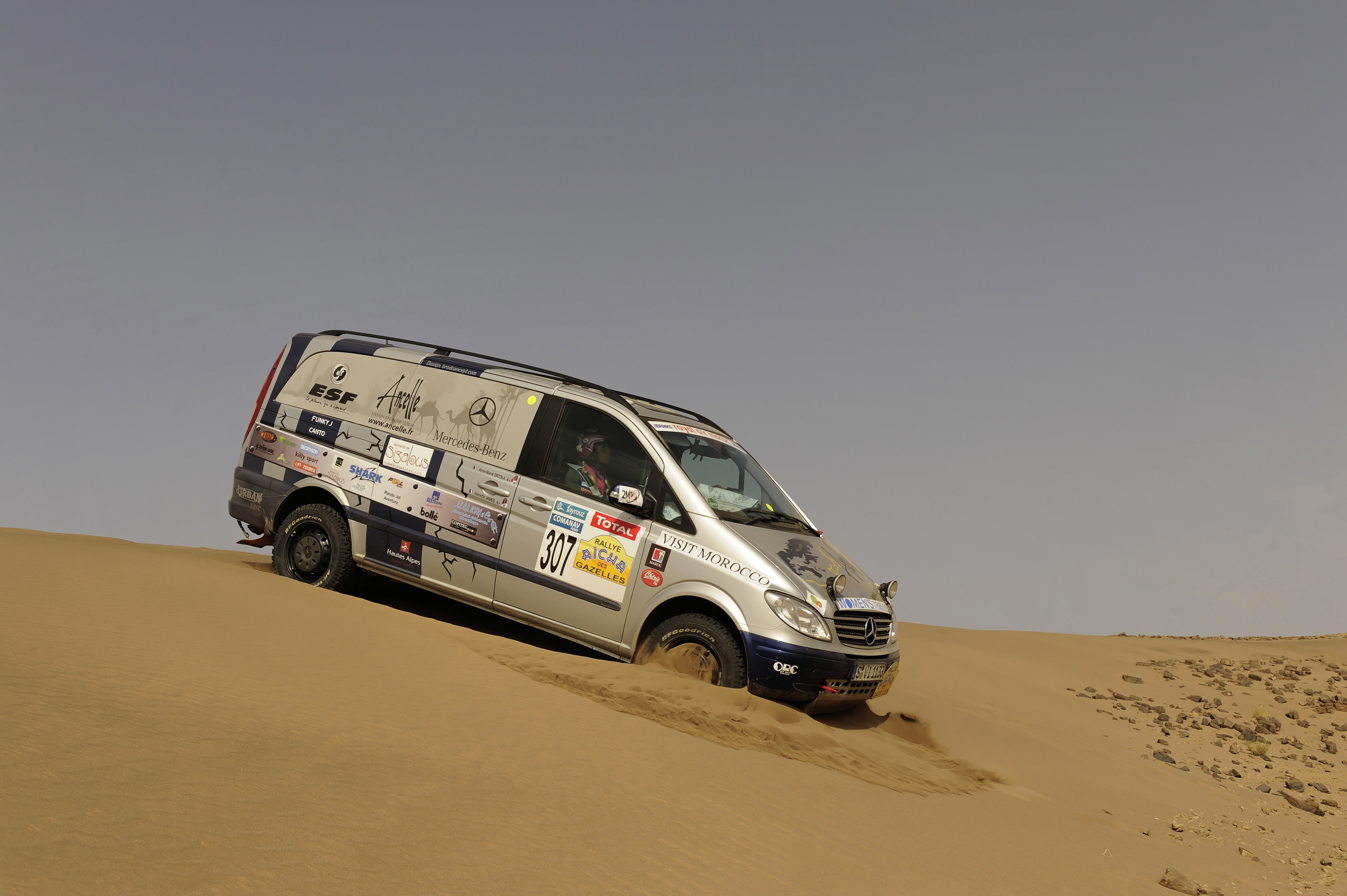
2009 winner of the Crossover category: Team 307 with a Mercedes-Benz Viano

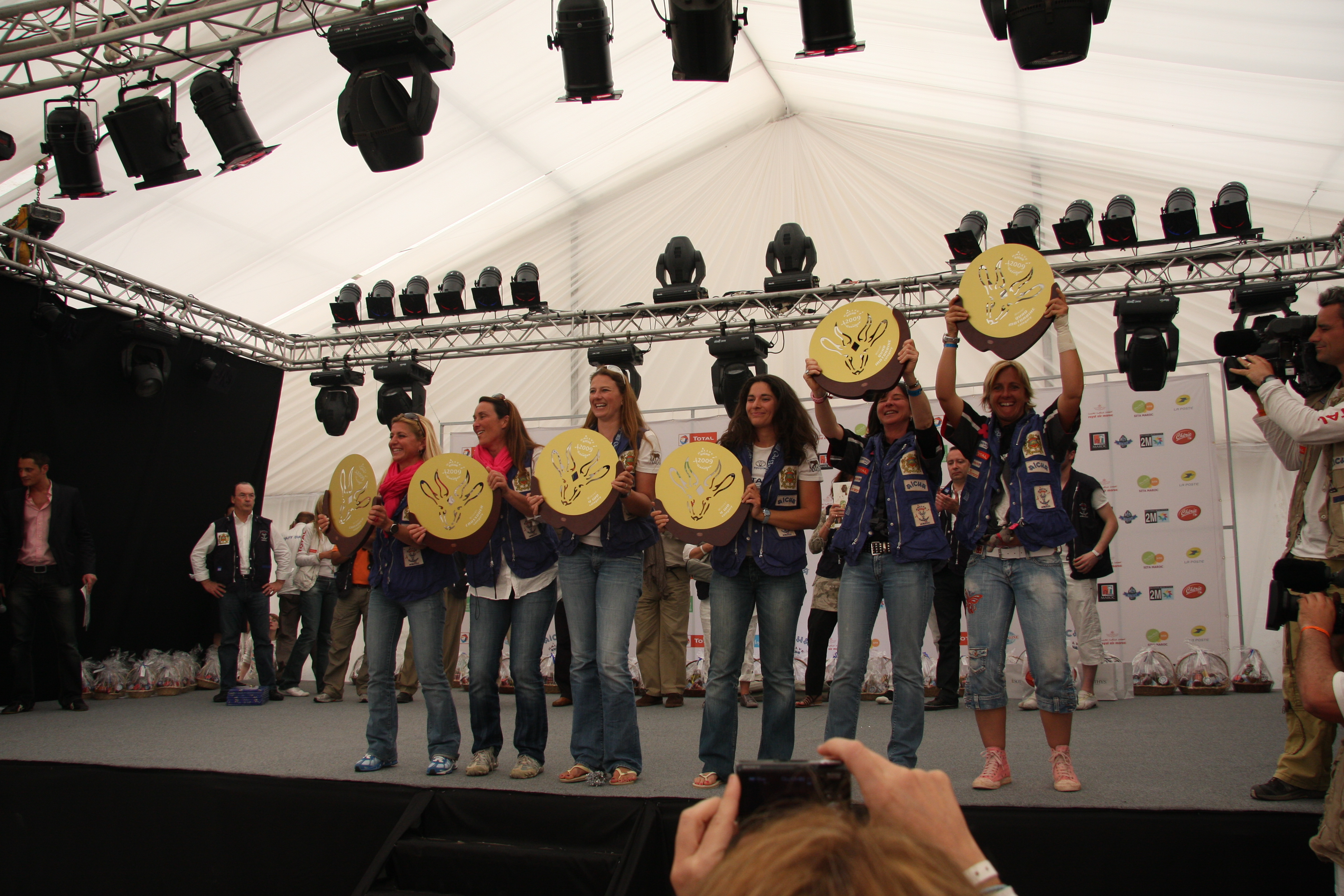
Winners of the 2009 rally

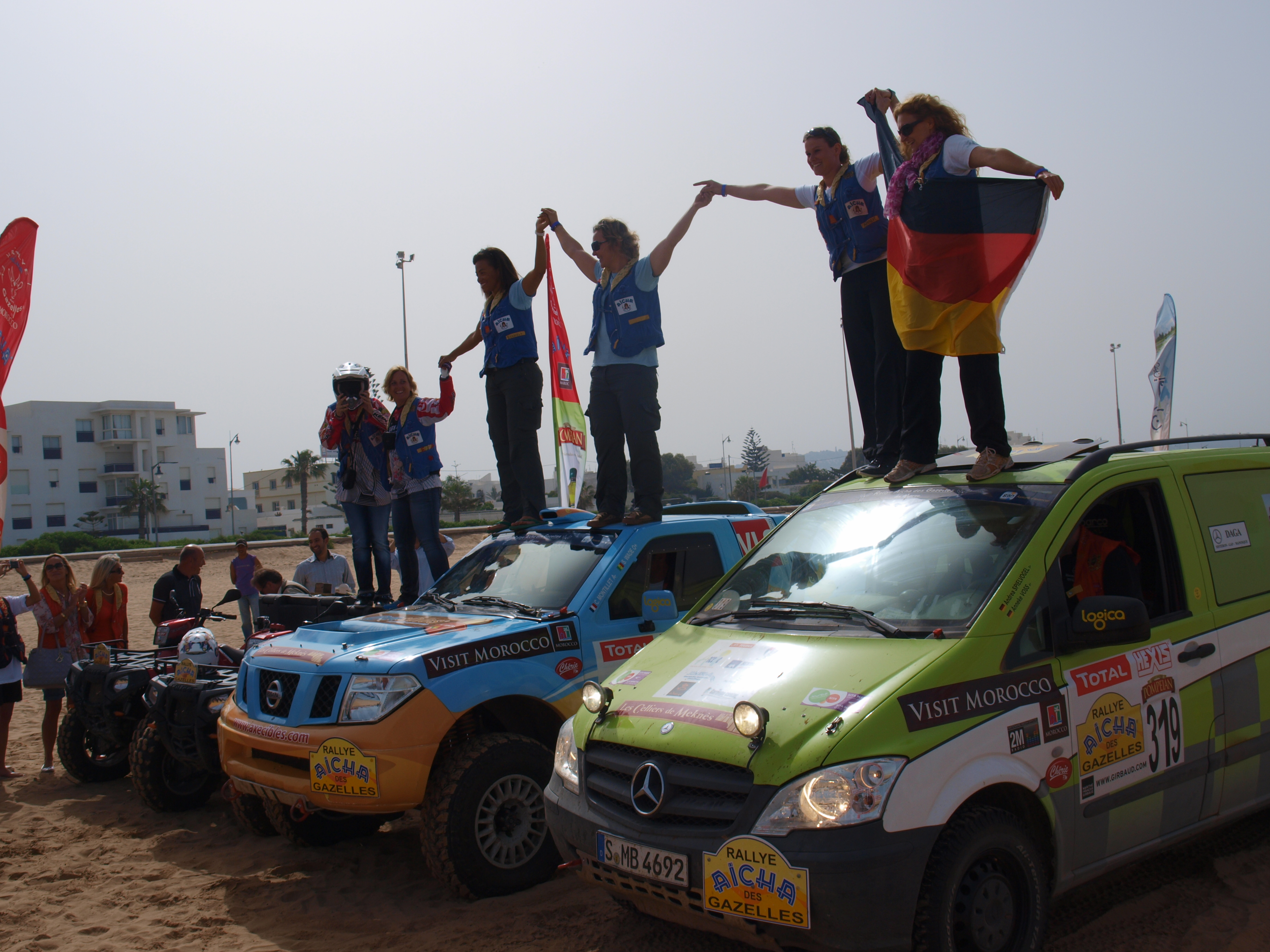
Winners of the 2011 rally at Essaouira

The Rallye Aïcha des Gazelles du Maroc is a rally which is held in the deserted parts of southern Morocco. The distinctive feature of the rally is that participation is restricted to women only.

In 2009, the 20th edition of the rally took place between March 18 and March 26 with the participation of 119 teams of women in the three categories: Quad/Motorbike, 4WD/Truck and Crossover. The rally started in Meknes with the finish-line in Essaouira on the Atlantic coast in southern Morocco.

== Mode ==
The Rally consists of one prologue and six legs, all entirely off-road, two of which are marathon legs lasting two days. A total of 2,500 kilometers through dried-out river beds, shock absorber-busting stony plains and the sandy dunes of the western Sahara desert have to be covered by the teams with only a compass and a 1:100,000 scale map to plot their route between checkpoints. GPS, and any kind of binoculars and cell phones are forbidden items. The winner is not the fastest team but the one which has traveled the fewest kilometers on the onboard odometer between checkpoints within a given time frame (distance driven minus straight-line distance). Penalty kilometers are allocated for missed checkpoints and requests for technical assistance. For safety reasons, the teams are constantly monitored by a satellite tracking system.

== History ==
Dominique Serra, head of the operating agency Maïenga, organized the first women’s rally in 1990. Initially planned as an image campaign and to dispel prejudices, today the Rallye Aïcha des Gazelles is one of the most important motor sport events in Morocco. The 2009 rally took place under the patronage of his Majesty, the Moroccan King Mohammed VI on the occasion of his tenth year of reign. For this reason the coat of arms of the Moroccan Royal Guard was exceptionally attributed to the event this year. King Mohammed VI had – much to the opposition of the fundamentalists and Islamist conservatives – reformed and liberalized family law in favour of women by creating a new family code, the Mudawana, during his 10 years of rulership.

== Environmental responsibility ==
MAÏENGA and the Rallye Aicha des Gazelles are now officially certified ISO 14001:2004. The Rallye Aïcha des gazelles is the only rally to obtain ISO 14001:2004 Environmental Management Certification in 2010. This international standard guarantees that MAÏENGA has introduced an Environmental Management System (EMS) for integrating environmental policy into its actions and its global management strategy. MAÏENGA’s Environmental Management System was audited by VERITAS, accredited independent certification body, which also audited the Rallye itself, on location in Morocco, to verify the event’s conformity to the EMS. ISO 14001 certification is based on the identification of environmental impacts, possible solutions for improvement, and the introduction of suitable processes.

== Coeur de Gazelles (Heart of Gazelles) ==
There is no prize money up for grabs for the participants. "The rally isn't just any other race – it's a commitment and dedication", says Dominique Serra. The money generated helps to finance teams of doctors providing medical care for the population in the remote regions of Morocco. Annually and with the infrastructure of the Rally, a medical caravan, including a mobile clinic with 8 doctors, cares for the rural population. This year 4,582 people received free medical care. In addition, aid for children's education has been set up as well as aid for an orphanage for children under six years of age.

== Winners ==
=== 2009 ===
- Categorie 4WD: Team 138 (Corentine Quiniou and Florence Migraine-Bourgnon), Toyota Land Cruiser
- Categorie Crossover/SUV : Team 307 (Anne-Marie Ortola and Jeanette James, Mercedes-Benz Viano)
- Categorie Quad: Team 24 (Isabelle Castel and Elizabeth Kraft, Polaris Sportsman 500)

=== 2010 ===
- Categorie 4WD: Team 125, Christine Laloue and Claudine Amat on Land Rover Discovery
- Categorie Crossover: Team 315, Isabelle Charles and Dounia Bennani on Dacia Duster

=== 2011 ===
- Categorie 4WD: Team 124, Carole Montillet and Syndiely Wade on NissanSpringbok
- Categorie Crossover/SUV : Team 319, Anneke Voss and Andrea Spielvogel on Mercedes-Benz Vito
- Categorie Quad: Betty Kraft and Caroline Couet-Lannes on Polaris Sportsman 850 xps

=== 2012 ===
- Categorie Quad bikes / Motorbikes: Team 20, Dorothée Langlois and France Cleves on Polaris Ranger RZR 800 S
- Categorie 4x4 / Camions : Team 187, Carole Montillet and Julie Verdaguer on Buggy Jugand
- Categorie CROSSOVER: Team 310, Sylvie Husson and Sophie Goset on Dacia Duster

=== 2013 ===
- Categorie Quad bikes / Motorbikes: Team 22, Isabelle Charles and Betty Kraft on Polaris Scrambler 850
- Categorie 4x4 / Camions : Team 188, Syndiely Wade and Florence Pham on Isuzu New D-Max
- Categorie CROSSOVER: Team 317, Paulina Hachoud and Anne-Sophie Cally on Dacia Duster

=== 2016 ===
- Categorie Quad bikes / Motorbikes: Team 27 – Betty KRAFT and Sonia BAUDOIN-GUERARD (POLARIS France)
- Categorie 4x4 / Truck : Team 179 – Régine ZBINDEN and Ela STEINER (JEEP)
- Categorie CROSSOVER: Team 318 – Viola HERMANN and Vanessa WAGNER (MERCEDES BENZ VANS)
- Categorie Expert Class: Team 407 – Sylvie FRECHES and Carole MONTILLET (SAINT HONORE)
