= Sara Misir-Vaz =

Jamaican racing driver and powerboat racer

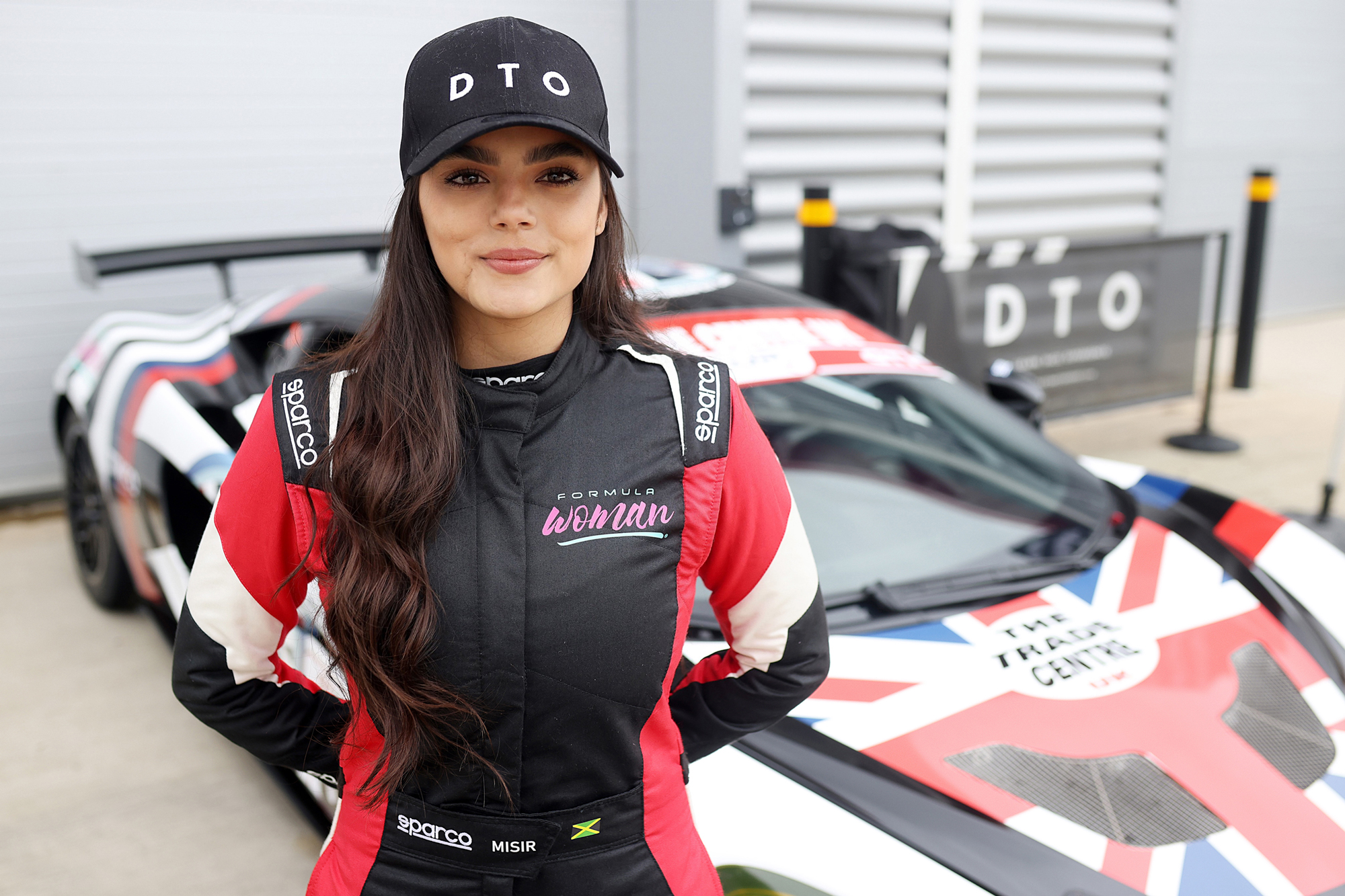
- Nationality: Jamaican
- Born: Sara Misir; 29 January 1998 (age 28) Nuttall Hospital, St Andrew, Jamaica

Sara Misir-Vaz (born 29 January 1998) is a Jamaican racing driver and powerboat racer. She became the first woman from the Caribbean to race for Formula Woman and competed in the British GT Cup Championship. In 2024, she became the first woman to win the Jamaica Race Drivers Club's Modified Production 4 championship. In her debut E1 Series season in 2025 for Team Blue Rising, the team won the Monaco round and finished third in the championship. She joined Aoki Racing Team for the 2026 season.

She had represented Jamiaica in equestrian as a junior, but left the sport in 2015 after facial and skull fractures from a kick by her horse, and a broken shoulder after she had returned to riding after those injuries.

== Early life ==
Sara Misir was born on 29 January 1998 at Nuttall Hospital in Saint Andrew Parish, Jamaica. She began riding at the age of four and went on to represent her country as a junior equestrian. She trained under coach Susan Wates and attended riding clinics in Colombia and Italy. By 2013 she was a member of the Jamaican national equestrian team, competing in show jumping and dressage, and had competed abroad in several countries. In May 2013, she finished second to Jason Walter in both the High League and the Hi Pro Grand Prix at the Kingston Polo Club and Equestrian Centre, losing the Grand Prix in a jump-off. In December 2013, Gallagher Insurance Brokers Jamaica announced a two-year sponsorship of her equestrian career, at which time she was aiming to compete at the 2020 Summer Olympics.

In January 2015, while training for the Pan American Games, she was kicked in the face by her horse, suffering facial and skull fractures. She underwent nine hours of surgery, and her jaw was wired shut for much of a recovery that lasted several months. She returned to riding later that year, but broke her shoulder in another fall in November 2015, after which she discontinued the sport.

During her recovery, her father, Rugie Misir, who had a background in motorsport and became president of the Jamaica Karting Association, encouraged her to try kart racing. She later recalled that she had started motocross racing with him when she was 10. She began motor racing at 18 and later said that she found the early years difficult because many of her rivals had been racing since the age of 4 or 5.

== Racing career ==
By June 2016, Misir had taken up kart racing. The following year, she made her circuit racing debut at Dover Raceway in a Volkswagen Saveiro, finishing fourth in her first race and third in her second.

In early 2022, she paused her master's degree and left her job to concentrate on racing. She became the first woman from Jamaica, and from the Caribbean, to race for Formula Woman; she was selected for the final of the 2022 Formula Woman competition from a field of almost 10,000 applicants. Finalists were assessed on speed, mental performance, fitness and technical knowledge. In early March 2022, after her team won an endurance race, she advanced to the last 15. At the final qualifying event, an ice-driving session in Åre, Sweden, in March 2022, she set one of the four fastest times among the 11 remaining drivers. This placed her in the top four and earned her a seat on the Formula Woman team for the 2022 GT Cup Championship. The four winners, and two reserve drivers, trained in McLaren GT4 cars before the start of the season.

Misir made her international racing debut in the 2022 GT Cup Championship at Snetterton Circuit, Norfolk, UK, on 11–12 June 2022. She drove the number 65 McLaren 570S GT4 for the Formula Woman team, sharing the car with English driver Steph Sore. The pair finished seventh and ninth in rounds 11 and 12. She went on to race at Oulton Park on 9 July, where she and Sore finished eighth in their group in round 13 before mechanical problems in round 14, and at Silverstone on 30–31 July. Formula Woman then withdrew its cars from the last two meetings of the season, at Donington Park in September and Snetterton in October.

In domestic competition, Misir won at three consecutive Jamaica Race Drivers Club (JRDC) meets at the Dover Raceway to emerge as the 2022 champion in both the Modified Production 3 and the TS1 classes.

Misir spent most of 2023 racing in Jamaica. In September, she returned to the GT Cup at Donington Park, sharing a Lotus Emira GT4 run by 24–7 Motorsport with Canadian Formula Woman winner Alana Carter. They raced in the GTH class for GT4 cars. Misir did the majority of the driving on the Sunday, qualifying eighth in class and finishing fifth in the sprint race, the team's best result of the weekend. The pair returned for the season's final meeting at Snetterton in October.

In 2024, Misir won the JRDC Modified Production 4 (MP4) championship, securing the title at the season's final meeting at Dover Raceway in December with 55 points, ahead of Doug Gore on 39. She was the first woman to win the MP4 title, and the first driver to win championships using the same car in different configurations in all four Modified Production classes. At the JRDC's Heroes of Speed meeting on 19 October 2026, she won both MP4 races from pole position and set the fastest lap of the day.

== Powerboat racing ==
In January 2025, Misir made her powerboat racing debut with Team Blue Rising in the E1 Series for electric hydrofoil boats, partnering American driver John Peeters. The pair finished third at the season-opening round in Jeddah, her first podium in the series. They were third again at Lake Maggiore in June.In July, Misir and Peeters won the Monaco round, achieving Team Blue Rising's first E1 victory. In October, they finished second at the Lagos round, and they were third at the season finale in Miami in November. Team Blue Rising finished third in the 2025 championship with 169 points, behind Team Brady and Team Rafa.

Misir moved from Team Blue Rising to Aoki Racing Team, owned by the DJ and producer Steve Aoki, for 2026. She was partnered with Dani Clos, a former Formula One test driver. At the season-opening round in Jeddah in January, she had a slight touch of boats with Team Rafa's Cris Lazarraga at the first corner but went on to win her second E1 victory, and was named Pilot of the Day. Aoki Racing led the championship after Jeddah, but were eliminated in the second qualifying session at Lake Como in April, and arrived at the Dubrovnik round in June third in the standings. The team finished third at the final round in Miami in November 2026 and placed fourth in the championship with 117 points.

== Awards ==
In January 2024, Misir was named the RJR/Gleaner Sports Foundation's female Motorsport Athlete of the Year for the third consecutive year. At the foundation's awards for 2025, held in January 2026, she was runner-up for Sportswoman of the Year and received the inaugural Breakthrough Athlete of the Year award. By 2026, she had been named Motorsport Athlete of the Year four times.

== Personal life ==
Misir's father, Rugie Misir, is Jamaican, and her mother, Alessandra Bartolini, is Italian, from Rimini. She has a master's degree in architecture and design from Florida International University. As of November 2026, she competes under the name Sara Misir Vaz.
