= Chithra Priya =

Indian racing driver

- Chithra Priya at Big FM 92.7 Young Achievers Award Ceremony in 2011
- Nationality: Indian
- Born: 30 March 1984 (age 42) Chennai, India
- Years active: 2005–present

R. Chithra Priya (born 30 March 1984) is a female biker from Chennai, Tamil Nadu.

== Early life ==
Chithra was taught motorcycle riding by her two brothers and she got her first bike in 2005. She participated in three novice motorcycle races in the 80 cc–110 cc category. During one race, she was the only girl. She came in third place for that race, but won gold as a rider at the Speed Run. Chithra is also very passionate about longer endurance rides.

== Career ==
Though motorcycle racing is recognized as a legitimate sport in India, Chithra had found it very difficult to fund her interest. Instead, she continues to pursue her passion in long-distance riding.

She is the only Indian female motorbike rider to be Saddle Sore certified. This is an endurance riding certificate awarded by the Iron Butt Association when she rode 1,600 kilometers in 24 hours. She has three Limca Book of Records in her name. The first one was awarded to the group she was a part of the Bikerni Association of Female Bikers India, for riding through Khardungala, the highest motorable road in the world. The second was for being the first and only woman to hold the International SaddleSore Record title, and the third for riding from Kanyakumari to Leh in 154 hours.

She is the main board member of The Bikerni group along with Urvashi Patole, and Sheetal Bidaye.

Chithra Priya, along with the Bikerni, partnered with Vicki Gray, the founder of International Female Ride Day (IFRD), and founder and director of MOTORESS® to celebrate the 10th edition of International Female Ride Day© in India. They organized a 10-day tour around Maharashtra and Gujarat. It was in sync with the worldwide action of International Female Ride Day©, which brings awareness to women in motorcycling. She is interested in Nature Conservation and volunteers with Greenpeace.

== Achievements ==
In 2011, she became the first Indian woman in history to have achieved the Saddle Sore certification by the Iron Butt Association by completing 1,650 km within 24 hours.
