= Tanya Muzinda =

Zimbabwean motocross rider (born 2004)

- Born: Tanyaradzwa Adel Muzinda; 30 April 2004 (age 22); Harare, Zimbabwe
- Occupation: motocross rider

Tanyaradzwa Adel Muzinda (born 31 August 2004) is a Zimbabwean Motocross rider. She was the first woman to win a motocross championship in Zimbabwe.

== Life ==
Muzinda was born in Harare in 2004. She began riding a motorbike when she was five, encouraged by her enthusiastic father, Tawanda. Her mother is named Adiyon and she has three siblings.

In 2017, Muzinda had a fall that damaged her hip and she had difficulty walking for several months. In the same year, she competed in her first race overseas when she raced at the HL Racing British Master Kids Championships which was held at the Motoland track near Mildenhall. She enjoyed the race and came third.

Motocross championships were first organized in Rhodesia (now Zimbabwe) in 1957. No woman had ever won a championship until Muzinda won. The Africa Union Sports Council Region Five Annual Sports Awards honored Muzinda South Africa's Junior Sportswoman of the Year in 2018. The African Union recognized her as the junior sportswoman of the Year in 2018. At the end of 2019, she and her family moved to Florida supported by the Italian three times world motocross champion Stefy Bau. Bau became her manager while her father continued as her (and two of her siblings) trainer. Muzinda is a European Union honorary ambassador for Youth, Gender, Sports and Development to Zimbabwe.

In 2021, Muzinda was named as one of the BBC's 100 Women. Her winnings have enabled her to pay school fees for 100 children in Harare.
