= Angelle Sampey =

American drag racer

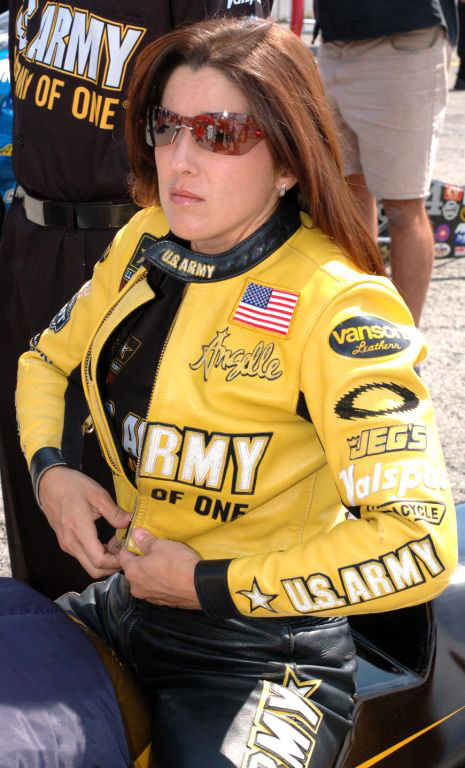
- Sampey on her bike in 2005
- Born: August 7, 1970 (age 56) New Orleans, Louisiana, U.S.

NHRA Camping World Drag Racing Series career
- Debut season: 1996
- Former teams: Vance & Hines
- Championships: 3 (PSM)
- Wins: 47

Championship titles
- 2000, 2001, 2002: NHRA Pro Stock Motorcycle Champion
- Statistics up to date as of September 16, 2025.

Angelle Sampey (born Angelle Monique Sampey, August 7, 1970, New Orleans, Louisiana) is an American drag racer, originally in Pro Stock Motorcycle but currently in Top Alcohol Dragster. She won the NHRA Pro Stock Motorcycle championship three times (2000-2002). Since her debut in 1996, she has earned an all-time class record 45 top-qualifier awards and 46 event victories, the second most wins for any female in both NHRA competition and professional motor sports as a whole. On June 23, 2007 at Old Bridge Township Raceway Park in Englishtown, New Jersey, she scored her 42nd career pole position and more importantly set the national Pro Stock Motorcycle elapsed time record with a 6.871 second run. Following her April 1, 2007 win in Houston, Texas, Sampey was just five wins away from setting the all-time Pro Stock Motorcycle wins record, currently held by Dave Schultz. Sampey also holds the active record of 182 consecutive races without a Did not qualify, dating back to her professional debut. She also holds the mark of 364 round wins in 506 competitive rounds, which calculates to a 71.9% win-per-round ratio.

Sampey raced a Suzuki from 1996 through 2007, sponsored most notably by R.J. Reynolds' Winston brand and the U.S. Army.

Due to lack of sponsorship, Sampey did not race during the 2009 season, breaking her string of event qualifications.

On 11 March 2010, Sampey announced her retirement as a professional drag racer.

Along with Erica Enders, Shirley Muldowney, Brittany Force, and Christina Nielsen, Sampey is one of a very few women to have won a major motorsports championship title; she, Enders and Muldowney are the only female drag racers to have scored more than ten NHRA event wins, as well as the only three women in the sport to win more than one championship in their respective divisions, Muldowney with three in Top Fuel, Enders with five in Pro Stock and Sampey with three in Pro Stock Motorcycle. Angelle is considered the second winningest female in professional motorsports history with 46 career wins following Erica Enders 47th win in 2023.

Sampey also raced under her married names Angelle Seeling and Angelle Savoie.

On 13 September 2014, it was announced that Sampey would return before the end of the 2014 NHRA season, and will compete for the championship in 2015. She raced until 2022, when at the end of the 2022 season, she left Vance & Hines Suzuki.

In August 2023, Sampey made the transition into Top Alcohol Dragster, joining fellow former Pro Stock Motorcycle rider Antron Brown on his AB Motorsports Accelerate program. After earning her A/Fuel licence in Jasmine Salinas' TA/D (the sister of Jianna Evaristo, another PSM rider), she debuted at the Texas Motorplex in preparation for a season in the popular sportsman class in 2024 (under NHRA rules for the sportsman class, drivers must make selected races at regional and selected races in national events), with a future plan of racing in Top Fuel. In her first race, she qualified 16th (last qualifier) at 5.356 seconds. She defeated Mike Coughlin in her first round and Tony Stewart in the second round before falling to Kirk Wolf in the semifinals.

== Gallery ==
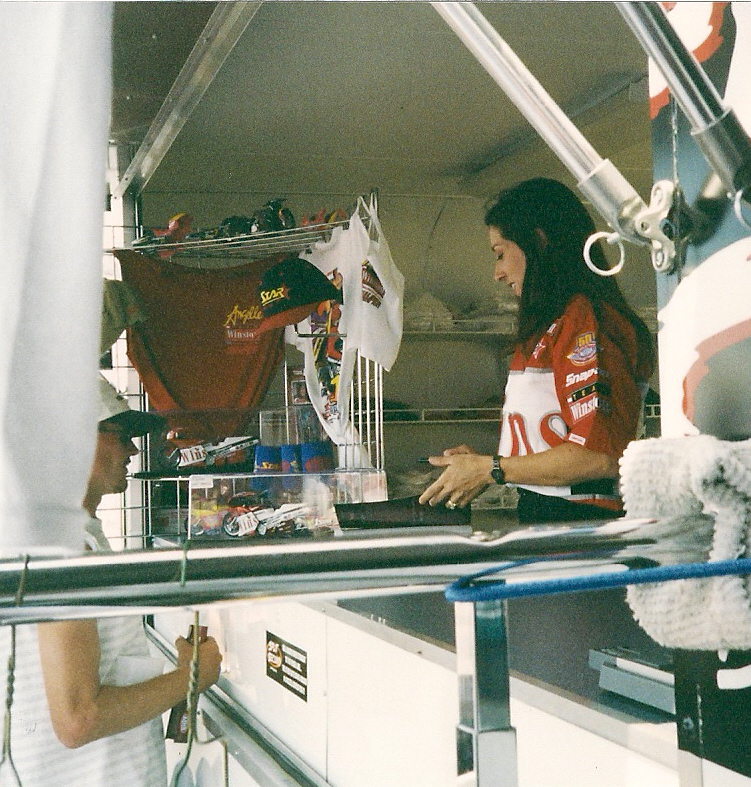
Sampey in 2001 talking to a fan at the Southern Nationals at Atlanta Dragway in Commerce, Georgia

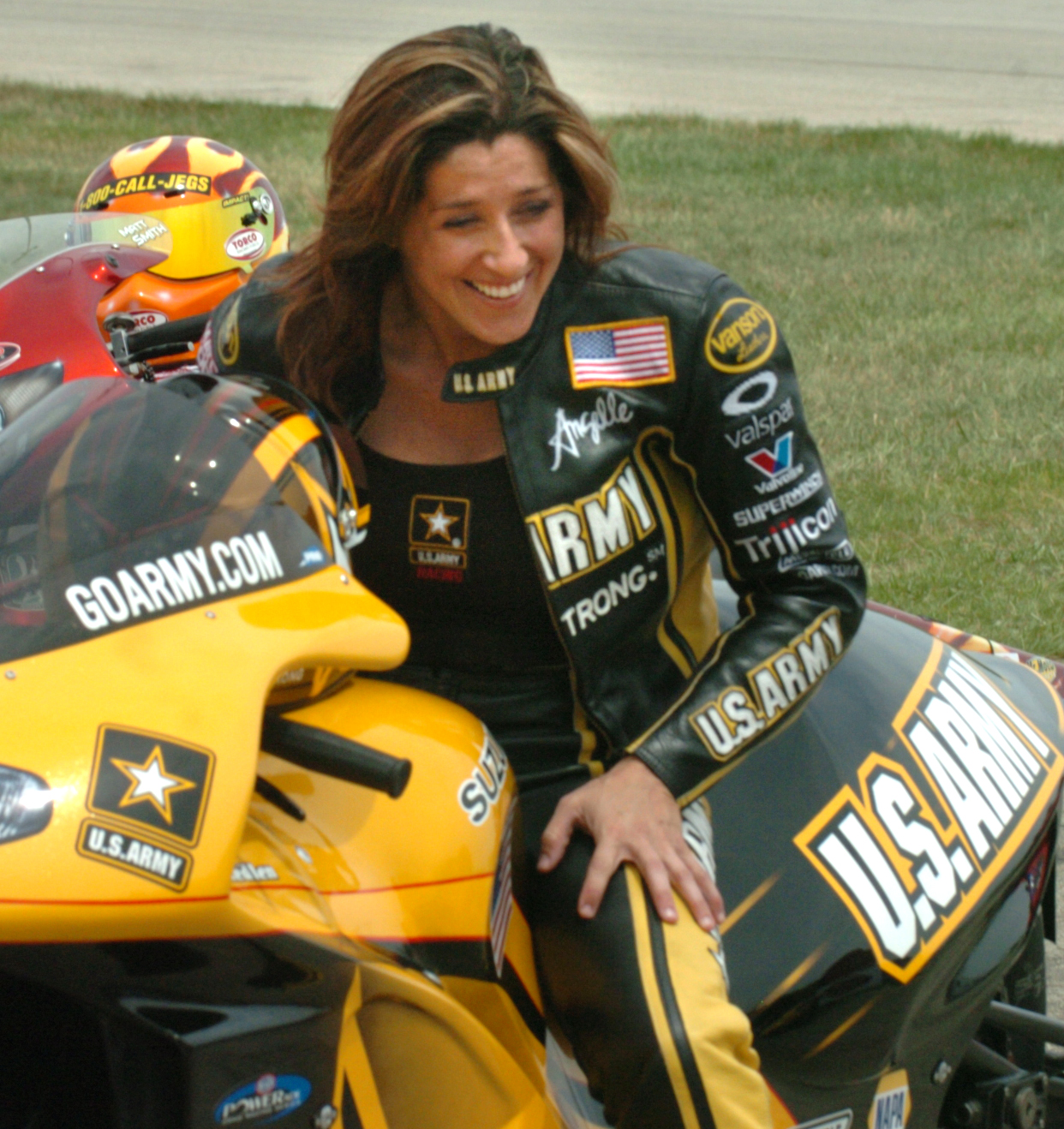
Angelle Sampey on her bike in 2007
