= Formula Woman =

Single-Seater Racing Championship

Formula Woman, which was known as the Privilege Insurance Formula Woman Championship for sponsorship reasons, is a female-only one make racing series started in the UK. It was inspired by the lack of female drivers in other series and was created, amongst other reasons, to boost the female audience of the sport. Despite the use of the word formula in its name, the series has not used single-seaters.

It began in 2004 and ran until 2006. Formula Woman returned in 2021.

== 2004–2006 ==
In 2004, all 16 drivers raced Mazda RX-8s over seven rounds around four British racing circuits. For 2005, support was dropped by Mazda and instead drivers competed in Caterham 7s.

=== 2004 ===
The inaugural season of Formula Woman was based around a television series on ITV. Thousands of women applied to join, with ultimately 17 drivers being chosen to compete. Experienced motoring journalist Vicki Butler-Henderson hosted the ITV show, while racing drivers Katherine Legge and Tim Harvey were both part of the judging panel. Legge left for unknown reasons early into the selection process.

==== Race calendar ====
Round	Circuit	Date	Race winner
1	(United Kingdom) Oulton Park	12 June	(United Kingdom) Natasha Firman
2	(United Kingdom) Oulton Park	12 June	(United Kingdom) Natasha Firman
3	(United Kingdom) Knockhill Racing Circuit	27 June	(United Kingdom) Margo Gardner
4	(United Kingdom) Knockhill Racing Circuit	27 June	(United Kingdom) Margo Gardner
5	(United Kingdom) Cadwell Park	4 July	(United Kingdom) Lorraine Pinner
6	(United Kingdom) Brands Hatch	25 July	(United Kingdom) Lorraine Pinner
7	(United Kingdom) Brands Hatch	25 July	(United Kingdom) Lorraine Pinner

==== Championship standings ====
The 2004 championship was won by Natasha Firman.

Pos	Driver	Pts
1	Natasha Firman	215
2	Lorraine Pinner	209
3	Bev Tyler	161
4	Juliette Thurston	146
5	Emma Hayles	122
6	Margo Gardner	112
7	Pippa Cow	104
8	Lauren Blighton	94
9	Nicola Robertson	80
10	Judith Lyons	74
11	Sarah Bennet-Baggs	73
12	Amy Handford	70
13	Victoria Hardy	63
14	Max Thompson	47
15	Catherine Gard	31
16	Joanna Linton	28
17	Karen Andrews	20

=== 2005 ===
Formula Woman returned in 2005 using Caterham 7's after Mazda withdrew support. The series was run as a Nations Cup. Natalie Butler from England won the 2005 Championship.

==== Entry list ====
Nation	Driver
(England)	Emma Hayles
(England)	Annie Templeton
(England)	Natalie Butler
(Scotland)	Margo Gardner
(Wales)	Rachel Owen
(Republic of Ireland)	Jennifer Daniel
(South Africa)	Jennifer Murray
(Sweden)	Nettan Lindgren
(Poland)	Anna Walewska
(Australia)	Lauren Gray
(United States)	Amanda Hennessy
(Netherlands)	Theresia Balk

Following the end of the season in November, a novices race weekend was held at Pembrey, South Wales, using exclusive Caterham 7 race cars, with a record 62 women competing. The four race winners were automatically given entry to the 2006 Formula Woman championship.

==== Novice Race winners ====
Nation	Driver
(United Kingdom)	Amanda Elliott
(United Kingdom)	Michelle Nixon
(United Kingdom)	Lucy Redding
(United Kingdom)	Amanda Black

=== 2006 ===
The series continued in 2006, again using the Caterham 7 car but without any television coverage. Ultimately, Nikki Welsby won the championship.

The series was not renewed for 2007.

== 2021–present ==
In November 2020, it was announced that Formula Woman would be making a come-back. The series opened for applicants in March 2021 with a view to the series starting in the autumn of the same year with an accompanying television package. The new competition prize offered winners the opportunity to race a McLaren 570S GT4 in the British GT Cup Championship that 16 drivers will compete for.

The series secured major sponsorship including McLaren, Trade Centre, and Vauxhall.

Test days took place at circuits including Knockhill and Anglesey Circuit. The assessments for the final driver decisions took place in December 2021, following a test day at Bedford Autodrome using Vauxhall Corsa-e cars.

In March 2022, the competition progressed to select 15 finalists from 70, with more selections involving a track kart test at Croft to achieve 10, followed by a future final race for four contestants.

=== 2021/22 ===
==== Finalists ====
Nation	Driver	Notes
(Canada)	Erika Hoffman	Winner
(Scotland)	Jodie Sloss	Winner
(Jamaica)	Sara Misir	Winner
(India)	Anushriya Gulati	Winner
(England)	Amy Riley	Reserve
(England)	Steph Sore	Reserve
(England)	Eliza Seville	
(England)	Alicia Barrett	
(England)	Vikki Campbell	
(England)	Rebecca Mellor	
(England)	Abbie Carruthers	

=== 2022/23 ===
==== Finalists ====
Nation	Driver	Notes
(Canada)	Alana Carter	Winner
(England)	Eliza Seville	Winner
(England)	Emma Vennard	
(France)	Evy Longepe	
(England)	Grace Webb	
(England)	Esme Vines	
(England)	Claudia Lance Jones	
(England)	Nicole Sharples	
(Hong Kong)	Oi Man Leung	
(Australia)	Amanda Henir	

== See also ==
- W Series, an all-female F3-class racing series founded in 2018
- F1 Academy, an all-female F4-class racing series founded in 2022
