= Theresa Bauml =

German motorcycle racer

Theresa Bäuml
- Nationality: German
- Born: 27 October 1997 (age 29); Koblenz, Germany
- Current team: Ossa
- Website: http://www.theresabaeuml.de/ Theresa Bauml Official Website

Theresa Bäuml (born 27 October 1997) is a German Women's International motorcycle trials rider. She was the 2015 German Women's and FIM European Women's Trials Champion. In 2016 Bäuml retained her European title.

== Biography ==
Theresa Bäuml first rode trials on the international scene in 2010 at the Czech World Trials round. She returned there again in 2011 and scored her first international points with a 15th-place finish, ending the season 22nd in the FIM World Women's Trials Championship.

In 2012, Bäuml finished runner-up to Ina Wilde in the German Women's Championship. She was again runner-up to Wilde in 2013, finishing the season strongly with her first national win at the final Kiefersfelden round. On the international circuit Bäuml ended the season a creditable second place in the European championship behind British rider Emma Bristow.

A strong start to 2014 saw Bäuml win the opening three rounds of the German series, but was knocked back to second place later in the season, finished runner-up once again to Ina Wilde. They carried their rivalry over to the European Championships, with Bäuml taking a pair of wins in Poland, but Wilde managed to ahead on points for a repeat of their familiar one-two finish.

In 2015, Bäuml had her best season to date, turning the tables on Wilde and finally taking the top step of the podium at the end of the season. Winning her first German Women's Trials Title ahead of Wilde with Bianca Huber in third place. She also stood on the podium alongside Wilde and Mona Pekarek as a member of the German Women's Trial Des Nations Team that finished runner up to the British team in the Czech Republic. But the icing on the cake was winning the European Women's Championship after taking second place in Italy and winning both rounds in Poland.

== National Trials Championship Career ==
| Year | Class | Machine | Rd 1 | Rd 2 | Rd 3 | Rd 4 | Rd 5 | Rd 6 | Rd 7 | Rd 8 | Rd 9 | Points | Pos | Notes |
|---|---|---|---|---|---|---|---|---|---|---|---|---|---|---|
| 2011 | (Germany) German Women's | Gas Gas | ROH - | ROH - | OSN; 5 | OSN; 3 | | | | | | 26 | 7th | |
| 2012 | (Germany) German Women's | Beta | SCH; 3 | SCH; 2 | OSN; 2 | OSN; 2 | | | | | | 66 | 2nd | |
| 2013 | (Germany) German Women's | Ossa | SPE; 5 | SPE; 2 | KIE; 2 | KIE; 1 | | | | | | 65 | 2nd | |
| 2014 | (Germany) German Women's | Ossa | SCH; 1 | SCH; 1 | KIE; 1 | KIE; 3 | WER; 1 | WER; 2 | OSN; 2 | OSN; 2 | | 146 | 2nd | |
| 2014 | (Netherlands) Dutch National | Ossa | MAA - | NUN - | SLE - | ZEL; 1 | SCH - | MAA - | ROT - | ZEL - | ZEL - | 20 | 16th | |
| 2015 | (Germany) German Women's | Ossa | ROH; 2 | ROH; 1 | WIE; 1 | WIE; 1 | WIL; 1 | WIL; 1 | OSN; 1 | OSN; 1 | | 157 | 1st | German Women's Champion |
| 2016 | (Germany) German Women's | Beta | SCH; 1 | SCH; 3 | OSN; 1 | OSN; 1 | | | | | | 75 | 1st | German Women's Champion |
| 2017 | (Germany) German Women's | Beta | FRA; 1 | FRA; 1 | SCH; 1 | SCH; 1 | OSN; 1 | OSN; 1 | WUS; 2 | WUS; 1 | | 157 | 1st | German Women's Champion |
| 2018 | (Spain) Spanish Women's A | Montesa | LAN; 4 | SIG - | SAR - | POB - | POB - | | | | | 13 | 5th | |

== Women's European Trials Championship ==
| Year | Team | 1 | 2 | 3 | 4 | 5 | Points | Rank |
|---|---|---|---|---|---|---|---|---|
| 2010 | Gas Gas | ITA; 9 | AND; 9 | CZE; 8 | | | 22 | 7th |
| 2011 | Gas Gas | ITA; 9 | GER - | CZE - | | | 7 | 15th |
| 2012 | Beta | ITA; 5 | CZE; 6 | NED; 4 | | | 34 | 4th |
| 2013 | Ossa | CZE; 5 | NOR; 3 | SWE; 2 | | | 210 | 2nd |
| 2014 | Ossa | ITA; 3 | POL; 1 | POL; 1 | BEL; 2 | | 355 | 2nd |
| 2015 | Ossa | ITA; 2 | POL; 1 | POL; 1 | | | 285 | 1st |
| 2016 | Beta | ITA; 1 | POL; 1 | POL; 1 | GER; 1 | | 400 | 1st |
| 2017 | Beta | NED; 2 | LET; 3 | LET; 1 | ITA; 2 | | 340 | 2nd |
| 2018 | Montesa | SPA; 2 | POL; 3 | POL; 1 | ITA; 2 | BEL; 3 | 410 | 2nd |

== Women's World Trials Championship ==
| Year | Team | 1 | 2 | 3 | 4 | 5 | Points | Rank |
|---|---|---|---|---|---|---|---|---|
| 2011 | Gas Gas | GER - | CZE; 15 | ITA - | | | 1 | 21st |
| 2012 | Beta | AND - | AND - | SWI; 13 | SWI; 7 | SWI - | 12 | 14th |
| 2013 | Ossa | AND; 7 | AND; 10 | FRA; 11 | FRA; 8 | FRA; 12 | 23 | 10th |
| 2014 | Ossa | BEL; 6 | SPA; 5 | SPA; 3 | AND; 7 | | 36 | 5th |
| 2015 | Ossa | CZE; 5 | CZE; 6 | SPA; 5 | SPA; 5 | SPA; 6 | 33 | 6th |
| 2016 | Beta | GBR; 5 | GBR; 7 | ITA; 3 | ITA; 7 | FRA; 6 | 45 | 6th |
| 2017 | Beta | USA; 2 | USA; 3 | CZE; 11 | ITA; 1 | | 57 | 3rd |
| 2018 | Montesa | JAP; 4 | JAP; 6 | FRA; 7 | GBR; 9 | | 39 | 7th |

== Honors ==
- German Women's Trials Champion 2015, 2016, 2017
- European Women's Trials Champion 2015, 2016

== Related Reading ==
- FIM Trial European Championship
- FIM Trial World Championship
