= Mendy Fry =

American racecar driver

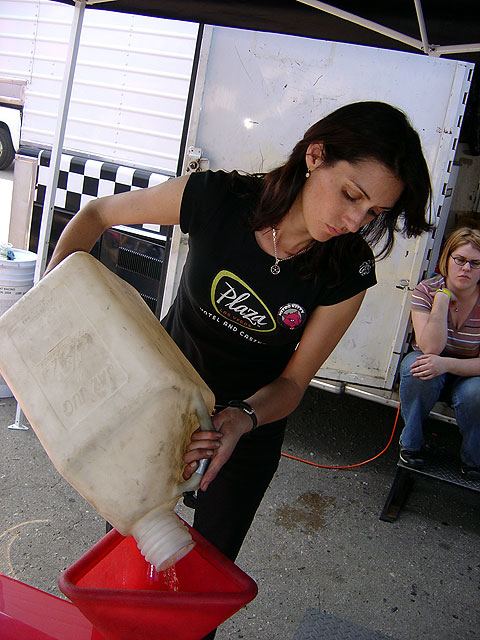
- Fry mixing nitromethane at the 2005 March Meet in Bakersfield.
- Nationality: American
- Born: May 24, 1969 (age 57) Santa Rosa, California, U.S.

NHRA Heritage Series career
- Debut season: 2008
- Current team: High Speed Motorsports AA/Fuel Dragster
- Car number: 781
- Former teams: Frymore Racing, Mendy Fry Racing, Ron Johnson Racing, Mastercam, California Trucker, McCain's Bomb Squad, Forever Young AA/Fuel Dragster, Smokey's Darkside Nitro Funny Car

Mendy Fry (pronounced "min-dy") (born May 24, 1969 in Santa Rosa, California) is an American dragster and funny car driver competing in the NHRA. Under the tutelage of her father, Ron, she began driving quarter-midget sprint cars at the age of four. As a teenager, she campaigned in the NHRA Top Alcohol Dragster class. She is the only female drag racer to record a five-second 1/4 mile elapsed time in a front-engined Top Fuel dragster, as well as the only female member of the exclusive "Nostalgia Top Fuel 250 mph Club". In 2019 she recorded the first 5.4 second quarter-mile elapsed time in a AA/Fuel Dragster.

== Early racing career ==
Fry drove quarter midgets at age four to six, but only began racing seriously at 12, when she first expressed interest in building and driving a dragster. She went to work for her father's shop at Sears Point Raceway to earn the right. She first raced at fifteen, in the shop truck, losing every round, but returning the next weekend. Her first sportsman car was a B Econo dragster once owned by Amos Beard. It was in the Econo dragster she earned her competition licence.

In 1988 in Fremont, California, at age 18, she became the world's quickest Top Alcohol driver, with a pass of 6.15 seconds at 220 mph (350 km/h).

== World's Fastest Street Rod Wars ==
In the late 1980s and early 1990s, Fry raced a supercharged and fuel injected Super Street 1927 Ford roadster, built by Fry and her father., in the NDRA/STREET RODDER MAGAZINE Series. Her toughest competition came from Steve Castelli (1941 Willys), Cole Cutler (1934 Ford Coupe), "Fat Jack" Robinson (1946 Ford sedan delivery) and Ray Castor. Fry faced and defeated them all as a teenager. During this time, Fry alternated between Super Street and NHRA Top Alcohol. In August 1990, she and her father went back to Indianapolis to the Goodguys Hot Rod Nationals to compete with the '27 Ford, eventually winning that event.

== Goodguys VRA Series ==
=== 2001 ===
After a decade long hiatus, Fry returned to driving dragsters at the 42nd Goodguys March Meet in Bakersfield, California. In her comeback, at the wheel of Ron Johnson's alcohol dragster, Fry reached the semi-finals in Junior Fuel.

=== 2004 ===
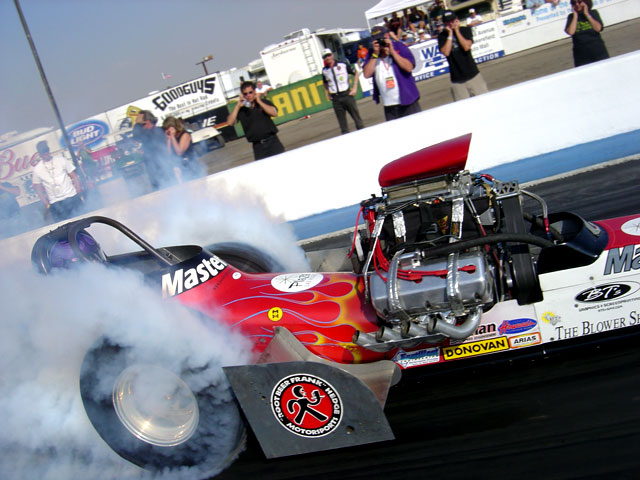
Fry at the 2004 California Hot Rod Reunion

In October, at the NHRA California Hot Reunion, Fry became the first female dragster driver to record a 5-second elapsed time in a AA/Fuel dragster (or "Nostalgia Top Fuel car"). Her a 5.87 second elapsed time trap speed of 251 mph (404 km/h) earned her membership in the Nostalgia Top Fuel 250 Mph Club.

=== 2006 ===
Fry was hired to drive the Jennings & Scheele AA/FD. Using a Chevrolet motor in a class dominated by Dononvan hemis, in competition at the NHRA Hot Rod Reunion, Fry established a new mark for Chevy-powered nostalgia fuelers when she stopped the clocks with a 5.85 second elapsed time.

== NHRA Hot Rod Heritage Series ==
=== 2008 ===
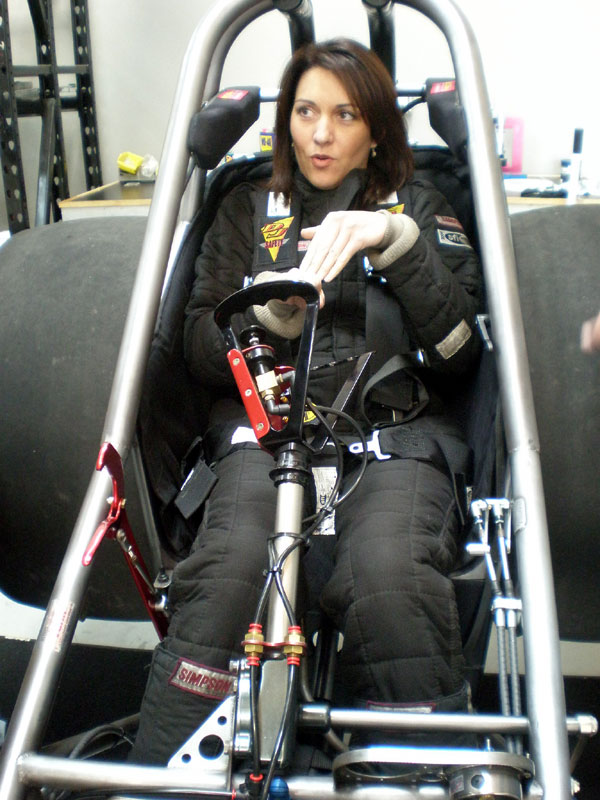
Fry getting fitted for the Future Flash Funny Car

Fry began the year campaigning the Future Flash fuel Funny Car in NHRA's Hot Rod Heritage Series. After a runner-up finish at the Las Vegas Speed Spectacular in May, Fry progressed to first in series points, despite a final round crash resulting in Future Flash withdrawing from further competition for the remainder of the year.

After missing a crucial event in Boise, Idaho, following the wreck, in September Fry resumed racing in the Nostalgia Funny Car class, signing on with the McCain's Bomb Squad fuel Funny Car team, finishing the year fifth in points.

=== 2012 ===
Fry campaigned the Forever Young dragster, and placed second in the Heritage Series Top Fuel Points Championship.

=== 2014 ===
After a one-year hiatus, Fry returned to competition in NHRA's Heritage Series, driving Smokey's Darkside, a 1978 Dodge Challenger fuel Funny Car, powered by a supercharged Arias engine, a “hemi heads on a Chevy block” combination unique to the class.

=== 2017 ===
In her debut with the High Speed Motorsports AA/Fuel Dragster, Mendy Fry won Top Fuel Eliminator at the prestigious March Meet in Bakersfield. She finished the season second in the NHRA Hot Rod Heritage Series Nostalgia Top Fuel Points Title.

=== 2018 ===
After only losing one round of competition that year, Fry won the NHRA Hot Rod Heritage Series Nostalgia Top Fuel Points Title.

=== 2019 ===
At the Good Vibrations March Meet, Fry posted a record-setting quarter-mile elapsed time of 5.49 seconds. This was the first pass in the 5.40s for a AA/Fuel Dragster (or "Nostalgia Top Fuel" car).
