= Natasha Firman =

English racing driver (born 1976)

- Nationality: (United Kingdom) British (Republic of Ireland) Irish
- Born: 22 June 1976 (age 50) Holt, Norfolk
- Relatives: Ralph Firman Jr. (brother); Ralph Firman Sr. (father)

Previous series
- 2005; 2004: EERC Production S1; Formula Woman

Championship titles
- 2004: Formula Woman

Natasha Firman (born 22 June 1976) is a British-born former racing driver who raced under Irish citizenship.

== Racing career ==
Firman competed in, and won, the inaugural Formula Woman championship in 2004. Over the seven races, Firman won twice and had six podium finishes. Following her success, Firman joined the new Production S1 class of European Endurance Racing Club's championship for 2005. The series, raced alongside Britcar, saw Firman continue to race a Mazda RX-8 supported by Mazda Motors UK and Guglielmi Motorsport. Her 2005 teammate was Mark Ticehurst. Firman and Ticehurst scored victory in class C of the series at the first round of the season at Silverstone.

== Personal life ==
Firman was born in Holt, Norfolk, and educated at Gresham's School from 1990 to 1994. Her father, Ralph Firman Sr., co-founded the Van Diemen racecar constructor. Her brother is former Jordan Formula One racing driver Ralph Firman.
