= Stephanie Reaves =

American professional race driver (born 1967)

Stephanie Reaves (born February 24, 1967, in Maine) is an American professional race driver. She was the first woman in history to earn an AMA professional motorcycle drag racing license, qualify at a NHRA national event and also became the first ever woman factory race driver for General Motors. Reaves competed in the Pikes Peak International race in 2000 and finished in third place. She has broken several world records in various racing venues.

In June 2016, in The 100th Anniversary running of the Pikes Peak International Hillclimb, Reaves became the fastest woman ever up the climb, posting a time of 10 minutes 56 seconds. Remarkably, this was achieved in a 2016 Viper ACR, rear wheel drive, manual transmission, production class car. Reaves finished 70% ahead of the entire field, which consisted mainly of full blown race prepped vehicles, most weighing 1000 pounds lighter than her production weight vehicle.

Reaves also appears as "Norma Bates" in the infamous shower scene, of Gus Van Sant's 1998 remake of Alfred Hitchcock's thriller, Psycho.
