= Corentine Quiniou =

French racing driver

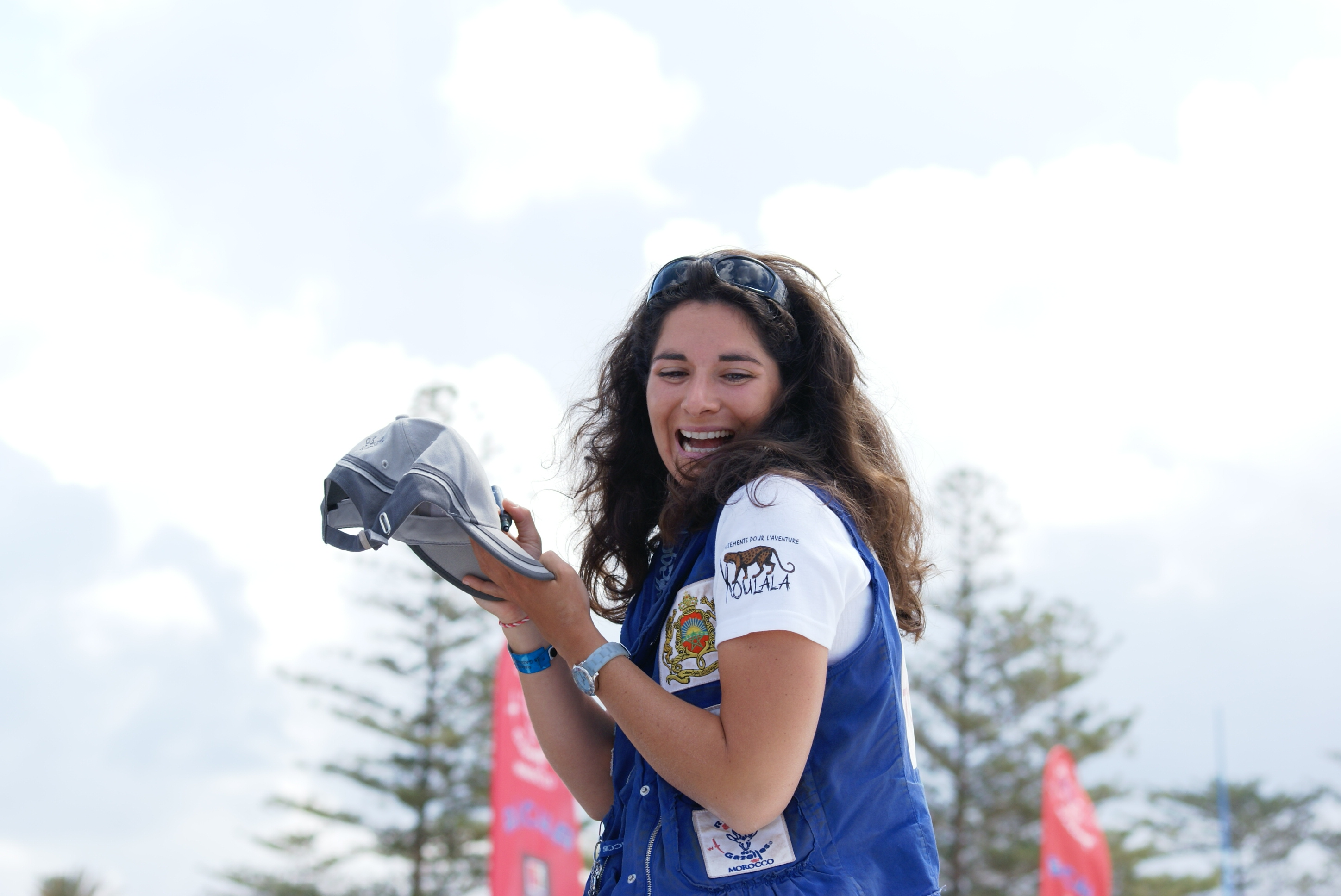
Corentine Quiniou at the finish line at 2009 Essaouira . Rallye Aicha des Gazelles

Corentine Quiniou (born 16 May 1982 in Paris) is a French racing driver.

== Early life ==
In a 2007 interview with Madmoizelle, Quiniou stated that she became interested in driving as a young girl while accompanying her father to amateur races, and that she began karting at age 14.

In 2001, she joined La Filière in Le Mans, learning formula racing while continuing her studies.

== Racing career ==
In 2004, Quiniou finished third in Rallye des Princesses in an Alfa Romeo Spider Duetto.

The following year, she won the 2005 Rallye des Princesses in a Porsche 911, and placed in other races that year, finishing second in the Rallye Aicha des Gazelles and third in the Rallye Optic 2000 de Tunisie, in the T2 Diesel category driving a Toyota Land Cruiser.

In 2006 Quiniou and her teammate Florence Bourgnon finished 49th overall in the Dakar Rally in a Toyota Land Cruiser, the only women's team to complete the race. In 2006 and 2007 Quiniou won the Rallye Aicha des Gazelles. In 2007, she finished 8th overall in the Transafricaine Classic from Paris to Dakar, winning one stage and the all-female classification. During the same year, she finished fifth in the Classic Endurance Racing in Europe in a Chevron B16. In 2008, she won the Classic Endurance Racing in a Chevron B16, both in Proto 1 ranking and in the drivers' ranking. In the same year she had to withdraw from this edition of Rallye Aicha des Gazelles after the second stage due to a mechanical problem.

Quiniou and her partner achieved a victory in 2009 Rallye Aicha des Gazelles. In a Ford Focus ST she participated in 24 Hours Nürburgring on 24 May, where she placed 100th overall and third of three finishers in her category. Between her participation in the Classic Endurance Racing, Quiniou joined the Gstaad Classic Rally driving a Jaguar XK150.

In 2010 Quiniou entered the Dubai 24 Hour in an Aston Martin V8 Vantage GT4 of Nicholas Mee Racing, finishing eighth of ten finishers in class and 49th overall. In her first attempt of Le Tour Auto-Optic 2000, Quiniou placed 25th overall, driving a Jaguar E-Type.

== Allegations of Misconduct ==
Quiniou and her navigator Florence Migraine Bourgnon on the Toyota team were disqualified in the 2010 Rallye Aicha des Gazelles for manipulation of their satellite tracking system and altering the odometer of their car. For the 2010 rally, the rules of the race were changed in an attempt to discover whether or not cheating was occurring, a question raised due to suspicions surrounding the Toyota team's record of three first place and one second-place finishes since 2005.
