= Stefy Bau =

Italian motorcycle racer

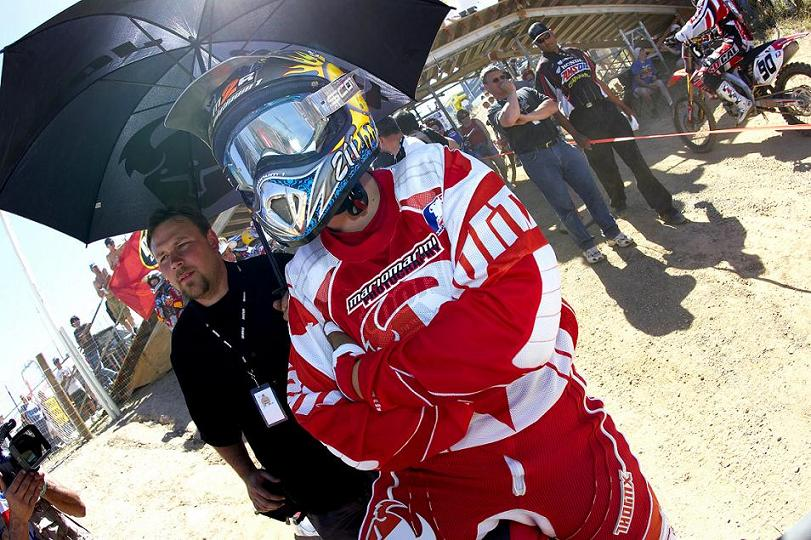
- Bau at Hangtown National Raceway in California
- Nationality: Italian

Motocross career
- Years active: 1983-2005
- Grands Prix: First Woman to win every round of the WMA National Championship (1999)
- Championships: 7 Italian National Championships, 5 US National Championships, 3 Women World Championships

Stefy Bau is an Italian former professional motocross and supercross racer. After a career-ending injury in 2005, she became the General Manager of the newly established FIM Fédération Internationale de Motocyclisme Women's World Motocross Championship. Bau is also a member of the CFM (Women Commission inside the FIM Fédération Internationale de Motocyclisme). As of 2019, Bau manages other racers, including Tanya Muzinda.

== Career ==
Bau is considered to be one of the fastest women motocross racers in the world. In 2000, she became eligible to compete against the male racers in the field. She won three world championships, holds two WMX USA championships, and the Loretta Lynn AMA Amateur National Motocross Championship in addition to seven Italian Championships. In October 2005, Bau had the accident that ended her racing career.

Bau was featured in EA Sports BIG's 2002 video game Freekstyle as a playable character alongside other real-life professional motocross and freestyle motocross riders.

At the end on 2019, Bau arranged for Zimbabwean motocross rider Tanya Muzinda and her family to move to Florida and she became her manager.
