= Terry Vance =

American motorcycle racer

Terry Vance (born November 26, 1953, in Bristol, Virginia) is an American former professional motorcycle drag racer, racing team owner and manufacturer of high performance parts for motorcycles. He is a fourteen-time motorcycle drag racing national champion.

In 1972, Vance formed a partnership with Byron Hines and the two men began competing in drag racing competitions. In 1980, they founded Vance & Hines, a company developing exhaust systems as well as building and tuning motorcycles. As well as drag racing competitions, the company also entered teams into AMA road racing competitions, winning the 1990 Daytona 200 and the 1991 AMA Superbike championship. Vance was inducted into the AMA Motorcycle Hall of Fame in 1999. Vance was inducted into the Motorsports Hall of Fame of America in 2022.
