= 2019 Indianapolis 500 =

American motor race

103rd Indianapolis 500

Indianapolis Motor Speedway

Indianapolis 500
- Sanctioning body: IndyCar
- Season: 2019 IndyCar Season
- Date: May 26, 2019
- Winner: (France) Simon Pagenaud
- Winning team: Team Penske
- Winning Chief Mechanic: Trevor Lacasse
- Time of race: 2:50:39.2797
- Average speed: 175.794 mph (282.913 km/h)
- Pole position: (France) Simon Pagenaud
- Pole speed: 229.992 mph (370.136 km/h)
- Fastest qualifier: (United States) Spencer Pigot
- Rookie of the Year: (United States) Santino Ferrucci
- Most laps led: (France) Simon Pagenaud (116)

Pre-race ceremonies
- National anthem: Kelly Clarkson
- "Back Home Again in Indiana": Jim Cornelison
- Starting command: Tony George
- Pace car: Chevrolet Corvette Grand Sport
- Pace car driver: Dale Earnhardt Jr.
- Two-seater: Mario Andretti (driver); Matthew Daddario (passenger)
- Starter: Paul Blevin
- Honorary starter: Christian Bale & Matt Damon

Television in the United States
- Network: NBC
- Announcers: Leigh Diffey, Townsend Bell, Paul Tracy
- Nielsen ratings: 3.4 (5.4 million viewers)

Chronology
Previous	Next
2018	2020

The 2019 Indianapolis 500 (branded as the 103rd Running of the Indianapolis 500 presented by Gainbridge for sponsorship reasons) was an IndyCar Series event held on Sunday, May 26, 2019, at the Indianapolis Motor Speedway in Speedway, Indiana. The premier event of the 2019 IndyCar Series, the event ran 500 miles (200 laps). Simon Pagenaud won the race from the pole position, earning Team Penske's record-extending 18th Indy 500 victory. Pagenaud led 116 laps, taking the lead for the final time with just over one lap to go from 2016 winner Alexander Rossi. He became the first French-born winner since Gaston Chevrolet in 1920, and the first pole-sitter to win the race since 2009.

The month of May activities formally began on May 11 with the IndyCar Grand Prix on the combined road course. Practice for the Indianapolis 500 began on Tuesday, May 14, and time trials were held May 18–19. Carb Day, the traditional final day of practice, as well as the annual Pit Stop Challenge and Indy Lights Freedom 100, were held May 24. Simon Pagenaud became the second driver in a row to sweep both the IndyCar Grand Prix and the Indy 500 in the same year. Pagenaud also won the pole position, the record-extending 18th Indy 500 pole for Team Penske.

Will Power, the winner in 2018, entered the race as the defending champion. During the Last Row Shootout on May 19, former Formula 1 World Champion Fernando Alonso, attempting his second Indy 500, was bumped from the field, and failed to qualify.

This would be the final Indianapolis 500 held under the ownership of the Hulman/George family. On November 3, 2019, it was announced that Penske Entertainment Corp., a subsidiary of the Penske Corporation, owned by Roger Penske, had purchased the Indianapolis Motor Speedway, the IndyCar Series, and IMS Productions. The sale was finalized in January 2020.

== Race background ==
The Indianapolis Motor Speedway is a 2.5-mile oval circuit with four turns banked at 9°.

=== Rule changes ===
- Cars were permitted one of two optional Gurney flaps atop the rear wing to increase downforce. A 3/8 inch tall flap, either 13.2 inches (34 cm) wide or 24.5 inches (62 cm) wide, can be affixed to generate 50–100 pounds of downforce.
- Marathon Petroleum replaced Sunoco as the official fuel provider beginning in 2019, using the Speedway brand.
- All cars were fitted with the Advanced Frontal Protection (AFP) device for cockpit protection. The AFP is a vertical, titanium device measuring 3 inches (76 mm) by 0.75 inches (19 mm), resembling a fin, mounted to the leading edge of the cockpit.

=== Track changes ===
A recycled polyethylene (RPE) binding agent was applied to the oval track surface; six drivers participated in an aero and tire test at the track in October 2018 following the application.

=== Qualifying changes ===
A revised qualifying procedure was announced, modifying the Two-day format used from 2014 to 2018. Qualifying continued to be held over two days (Saturday, May 18 & Sunday, May 19), but bumping was moved back to Sunday. Both the familiar Fast Nine Shootout and a new Last Row Shootout wes held Sunday. Cars continued to use the traditional four-lap qualifying attempts.

On Saturday, the procedure was as follows:

- Qualifying opened at 11:00 a.m. running until 5:50 p.m. All cars entered are guaranteed at least one attempt. Additional attempts were allowed, time/weather permitting.
- Positions 1–9 will advance to the Fast Nine Shootout.
- Positions 10–30 are locked-in, and will not re-qualify.
- Positions 31 and lower are entered into the Last Row Shootout.

On Sunday, time trials will conclude as follows:

- At 12:15 p.m. the Last Row Shootout will be held. Entries that finished 31st and lower on Saturday will have one attempt to qualify. Times from Saturday will be erased. Starting positions 31–33 will be filled. All other cars from 34th and lower will fail to qualify.
- At 1:15 p.m., the Fast Nine Shootout will determine starting positions 1–9, including the pole position. Times from Saturday will be erased, and cars will have one attempt to re-qualify. Championship points (9–8–7–6–5–4–3–2–1) will be awarded based on the results of the Fast Nine Shootout.
- After qualifying is concluded, a 2-hour, 45-minute practice session will be held. Furthermore, the Monday post-qualifying practice session will be trimmed from 3 1/2 hours down to 2 hours.

=== 2019 IndyCar Series ===
Five different drivers won the first five races of the 2019 IndyCar Series season. Josef Newgarden won the season-opening race at St. Petersburg. Series rookie Colton Herta won the inaugural race at Circuit of the Americas, in doing so became the youngest driver ever to win an Indy car race. Takuma Sato then won the race at Birmingham, and Alexander Rossi won at Long Beach. The month of May opened with Simon Pagenaud winning the IndyCar Grand Prix, his first win since 2017 and third win in the event. Entering the Indianapolis 500, Josef Newgarden led the championship points standings.

For the first time since 2015, no oval races were held prior to Indianapolis.

=== Sponsorship ===
On January 31, 2019, it was announced that the online financial services company Gainbridge would become the new presenting sponsor of the 500 under a four-year deal.

=== Pre-race ceremonies ===
- Kelly Clarkson performed "The Star-Spangled Banner" for the second year in a row.
- Tony George recites the starting command for the final time before Roger Penske purchases the Speedway from the Hulman-George family in November 2019.

== Entry list ==
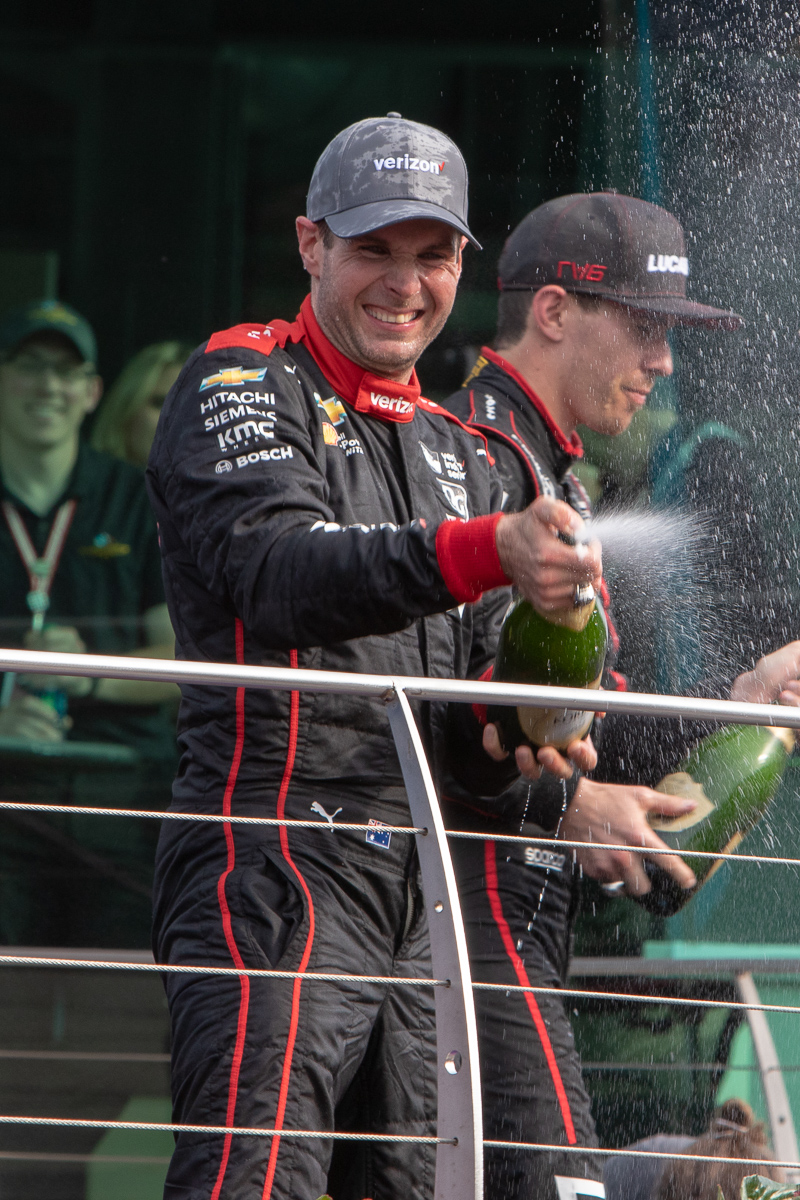
2018 Indy 500 winner Will Power.

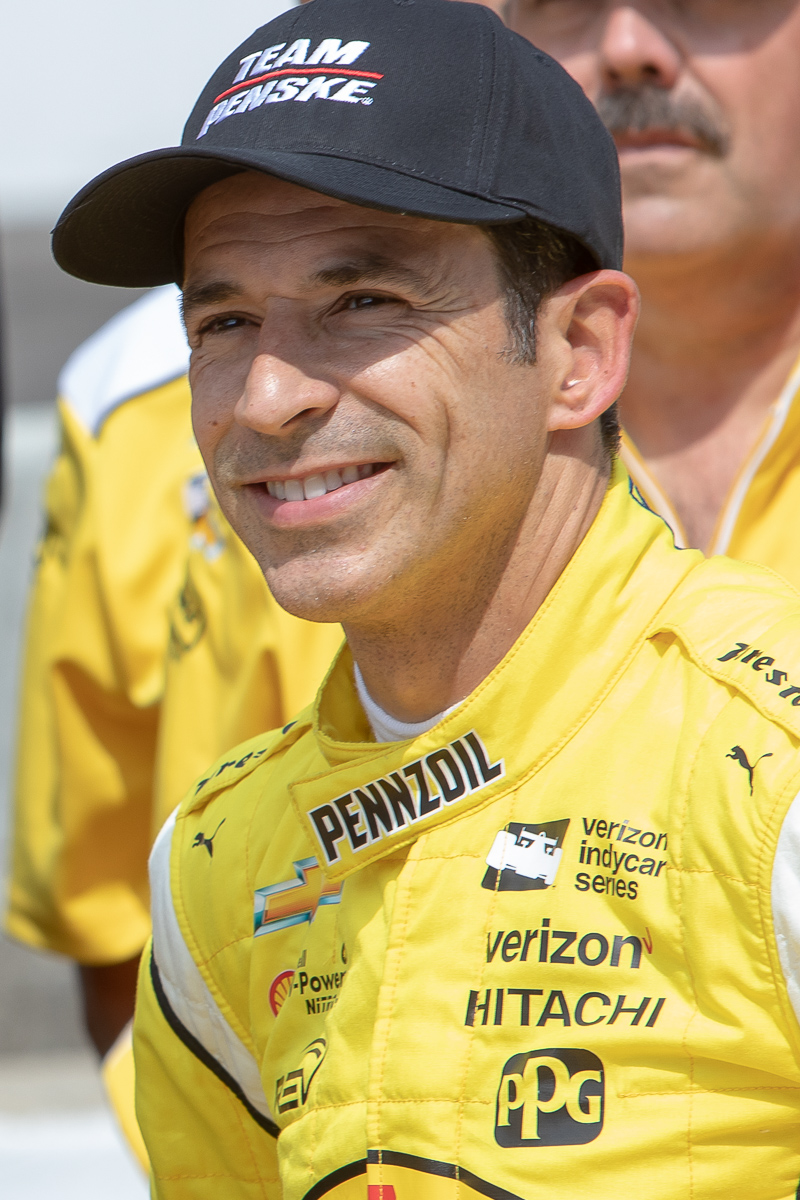
Four-time Indy 500 winner Hélio Castroneves has the most previous starts in the field with 18.

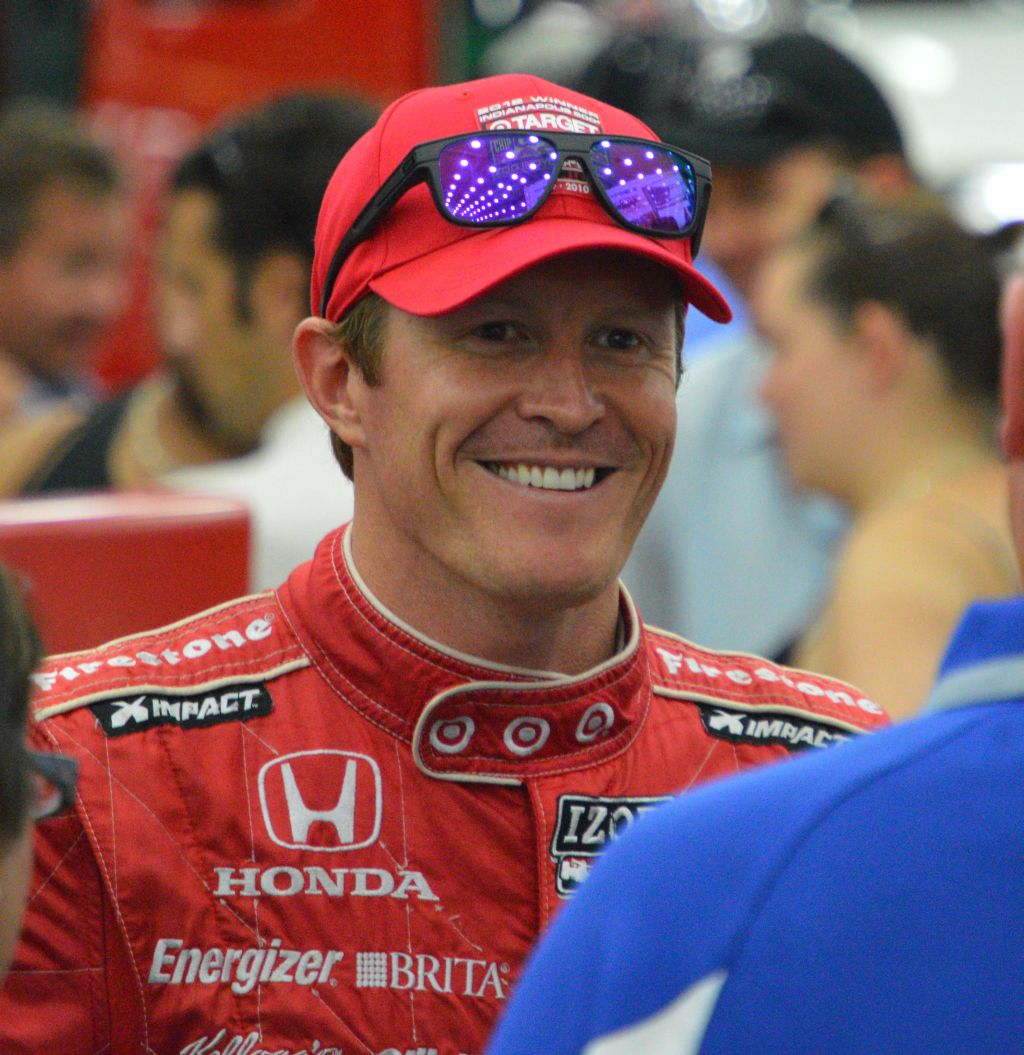
Scott Dixon is the 2008 Indy 500 winner, a three-time pole winner, and 5-time IndyCar series champion.

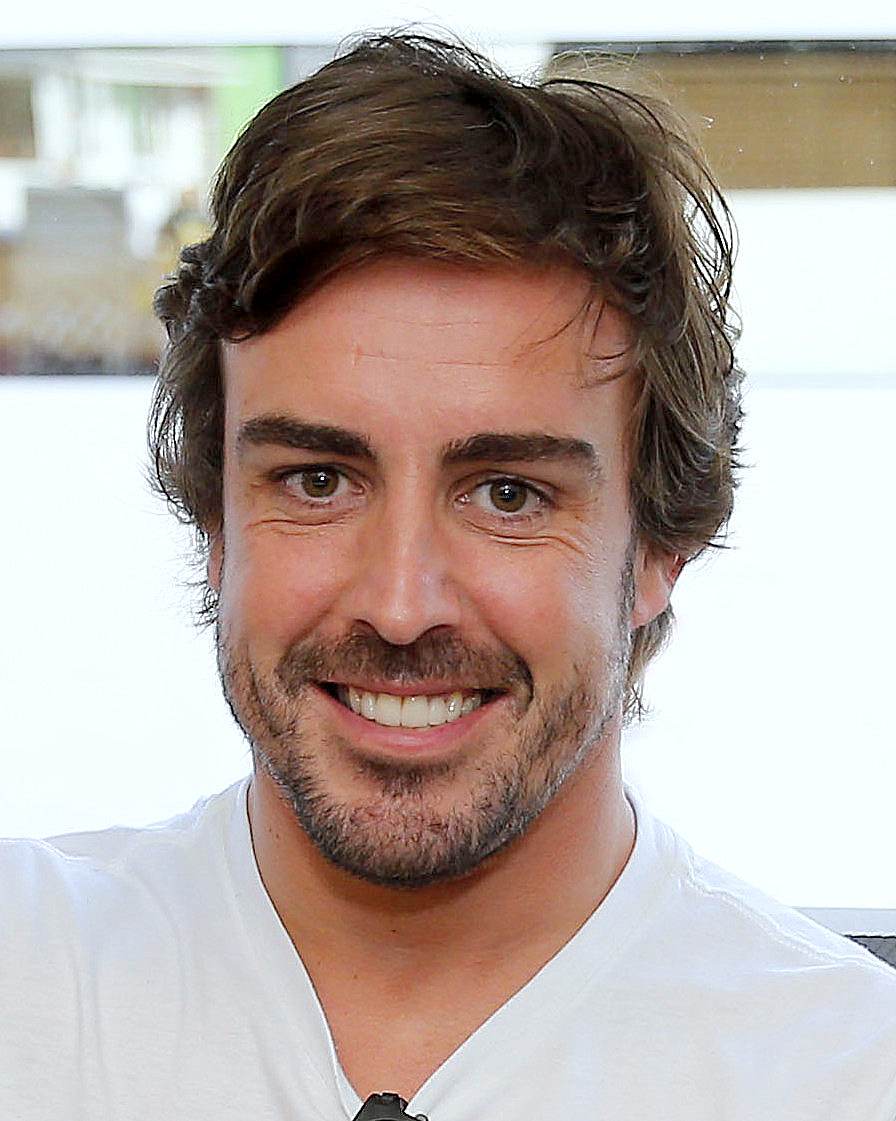
Fernando Alonso returns for his second Indy 500 attempt.

The official entry list was released with 36 car/driver combinations. All chassis are Dallara IR12 using the Universal Aero Kit, with Firestone tires.

- On November 10, it was announced that Fernando Alonso would return for his second Indianapolis 500 attempt, driving for McLaren, however he failed to qualify for the race. For 2019, the team used Chevrolet Engines. Alonso used car No. 66, the number that was carried by Mark Donohue who won the 1972 race driving a McLaren chassis for Penske Racing. On April 9, Alonso took part in a private test at Texas Motor Speedway, to re-acclimate himself to Indy cars, and to adapt to the UAK18 aero kit.
- 2018 Indy 500 and IndyCar Rookie of the Year Robert Wickens suffered a violent crash on August 19, 2018, at the ABC Supply Pocono 500, which would cause him to require extensive rehabilitation to regain use of his legs. Schmidt Peterson Motorsports announced that Wickens' IndyCar career is on hiatus until "he wants to and is able to return." For legal purposes regarding INDYCAR's Leader's Circle financial bonus, Marcus Ericsson replaced Wickens in the car, which was renumbered from No. 6 to No. 7.
- Marco Andretti drove a "throwback" paint scheme celebrating the 50th anniversary of Mario Andretti's 1969 victory. The livery was unveiled on NBC's Today.
- Colton Herta was the first driver entered in Indy history to be born in the 2000s.

No.	Driver	Team	Engine
2	(United States) Josef Newgarden	Team Penske	Chevrolet
3	(Brazil) Hélio Castroneves W	Team Penske	Chevrolet
4	(Brazil) Matheus Leist	A. J. Foyt Enterprises	Chevrolet
5	(Canada) James Hinchcliffe	Arrow Schmidt Peterson Motorsports	Honda
7	(Sweden) Marcus Ericsson R	Arrow Schmidt Peterson Motorsports	Honda
9	(New Zealand) Scott Dixon W	Chip Ganassi Racing	Honda
10	(Sweden) Felix Rosenqvist R	Chip Ganassi Racing	Honda
12	(Australia) Will Power W	Team Penske	Chevrolet
14	(Brazil) Tony Kanaan W	A. J. Foyt Enterprises	Chevrolet
15	(United States) Graham Rahal	Rahal Letterman Lanigan Racing	Honda
18	(France) Sébastien Bourdais	Dale Coyne Racing with Vasser-Sullivan	Honda
19	(United States) Santino Ferrucci R	Dale Coyne Racing	Honda
20	(United States) Ed Carpenter	Ed Carpenter Racing	Chevrolet
21	(United States) Spencer Pigot	Ed Carpenter Racing	Chevrolet
22	(France) Simon Pagenaud	Team Penske	Chevrolet
23	(United States) Charlie Kimball	Carlin	Chevrolet
24	(United States) Sage Karam	Dreyer & Reinbold Racing	Chevrolet
25	(United States) Conor Daly	Andretti Autosport	Honda
26	(United States) Zach Veach	Andretti Autosport	Honda
27	(United States) Alexander Rossi W	Andretti Autosport	Honda
28	(United States) Ryan Hunter-Reay W	Andretti Autosport	Honda
30	(Japan) Takuma Sato W	Rahal Letterman Lanigan Racing	Honda
31	(Mexico) Patricio O'Ward R	Carlin	Chevrolet
32	(United States) Kyle Kaiser	Juncos Racing	Chevrolet
33	(Australia) James Davison	Dale Coyne Racing with Byrd/Hollinger/Belardi	Honda
39	(United Kingdom) Pippa Mann	Clauson-Marshall Racing	Chevrolet
42	(United Kingdom) Jordan King R	Rahal Letterman Lanigan Racing	Honda
48	(United States) J. R. Hildebrand	Dreyer & Reinbold Racing	Chevrolet
59	(United Kingdom) Max Chilton	Carlin	Chevrolet
60	(United Kingdom) Jack Harvey	Meyer Shank Racing with Arrow Schmidt Peterson	Honda
63	(United Arab Emirates) Ed Jones	Ed Carpenter Racing Scuderia Corsa	Chevrolet
66	(Spain) Fernando Alonso	McLaren Racing	Chevrolet
77	(Spain) Oriol Servià	MotoGator Team Stange Racing with Arrow Schmidt Peterson	Honda
81	(United Kingdom) Ben Hanley R	DragonSpeed	Chevrolet
88	(United States) Colton Herta R	Harding Steinbrenner Racing	Honda
98	(United States) Marco Andretti	Andretti Herta Autosport w/ Marco Andretti & Curb-Agajanian	Honda
OFFICIAL REPORT

- W Former Indianapolis 500 winner
- R Indianapolis 500 Rookie

== Schedule ==
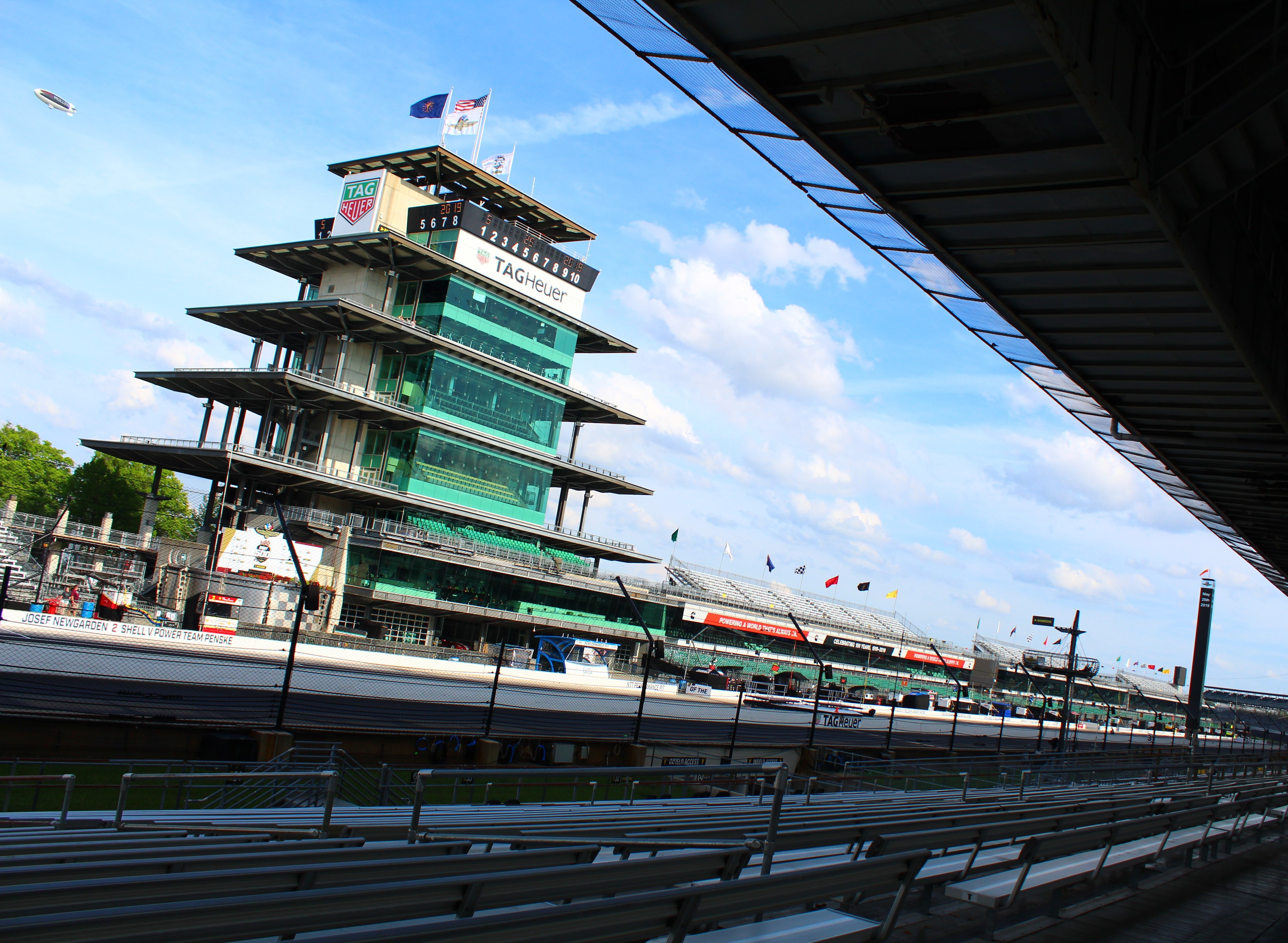
The Pagoda, the control tower which houses officials, broadcasting, and hospitality suites, is an icon at the Indianapolis Motor Speedway.

An open test on the oval was scheduled for and held April 24, 2019 followed by a private manufacturer's test on the combined road course on April 29.

Race schedules – April/May 2019
Sun	Mon	Tue	Wed	Thu	Fri	Sat
28	29; Private test (road course)	30	1	2	3	4 Mini-Marathon
5	6	7	8	9 Road to Indy; Practice	10; Grand Prix; Qualifying	11; IndyCar; Grand Prix
12; Mother's; Day	13; Car conversion day	14; ROP; Practice	15; Practice	16; Practice	17; Practice; Fast Friday	18; Time Trials Q1
19; Bump Day Q2; Pole Day Q2	20; NTT/Lights Practice	21	22	23; Indy Lights; Qualifying	24; Carb Day; Freedom 100	25; Legends Day; Parade
26; Indianapolis; 500	27; Memorial; Day	28	29	30	31	

Color	Notes
Green	Practice
Dark Blue	Time trials
Silver	Race day
Red	Rained out*
Blank	No track activity

* Includes days where track
activity was significantly limited due to rain

== Testing ==
=== August 2018 ===
On August 6, 2018, a private test was conducted at the Indianapolis Motor Speedway oval by Firestone. Two teams, one each representing Chevrolet and Honda, participated. Team Penske with driver Will Power tested for Chevy, and Chip Ganassi Racing with driver Scott Dixon tested for Honda. The test was focused on further development to the UAK18 universal aero kits which debuted in 2018. After some criticism during the 2018 race, improvements were made to the front wing endplate and underwing panels to address stability issues. Speeds were not announced, and no incidents were reported.

Private testing – Participants
Driver	Team	Engine
(New Zealand) Scott Dixon	Chip Ganassi Racing	Honda
(Australia) Will Power	Team Penske	Chevrolet

=== October 2018 ===
A series-conducted test was scheduled for October 17, 2018, at the Indianapolis Motor Speedway. Six teams tested with six cars, further developing aerodynamic specifications for the UAK18 universal aero kit as well as Firestone tires. In addition, the drivers were able to experience for the first time the performance of the Speedway's pavement, which was recently upgraded with an application of the asphalt binding agent Recycled Polyethylene (RPE).

No speeds were announced, and no incidents were reported. Following the test, the participants expressed that the track had more grip, and the new tire was more consistent than the compound used in 2018.

Testing – Participants
Driver	Team	Engine
(New Zealand) Scott Dixon	Chip Ganassi Racing	Honda
(Australia) Will Power	Team Penske	Chevrolet
(United States) Alexander Rossi	Andretti Autosport	Honda
(United States) Ed Carpenter	Ed Carpenter Racing	Chevrolet
(Brazil) Tony Kanaan	A. J. Foyt Enterprises	Chevrolet
(United States) Graham Rahal	Rahal Letterman Lanigan Racing	Honda

=== Oval test – Friday April 19 ===
Three Indy 500 rookies took part in an oval acclimation test at Texas Motor Speedway on April 19. Ben Hanley, Colton Herta and Marcus Ericsson took part in the test, which was conducted by IndyCar officials. The test provided the drivers with high-speed oval experience prior to the start of the Rookie Orientation Program. Conditions were reported as windy, and no incidents were reported.

=== Open test and Rookie Orientation – Wednesday April 24 ===
- Weather: 59 °F (15 °C), rain, winds up to 15 mph
- Summary: A full-field open test at the Indianapolis Motor Speedway was scheduled for Wednesday April 24, 2019. A total of fifteen teams, featuring 28 drivers, were scheduled to participate. The test was split into three segments, with the first segment reserved for full-time IndyCar Series veterans. The second session was the Rookie Orientation Test and the Refresher Test (drivers who have previously raced in the Indy 500 but have not raced an NTT IndyCar Series race on a high-speed oval since the previous year's Indy 500), and the third session was for all veterans as well as drivers who passed either the rookie or refresher tests.

Testing began on-time at 11:00 am, however, the track was closed after eleven minutes due to rain. The track re-opened to resume the first segment shortly after 3:00 pm. At about 4:45 pm, a light rain shower closed the track again. Around 6 pm, the track re-opened for the Rookie Orientation Program and refresher session, and ran until moisture ended the day at 7:30 pm. The third session was cancelled.

A total of twenty drivers took part in the first session, completing 707 laps. Takuma Sato set the fastest lap of the day (226.993 mph) and also had a "no-tow" lap of nearly 223 mph. Tony Kanaan failed to run any laps at speed, and Max Chilton suffered a blown engine.

The Rookie Orientation Program and the Refresher tests were next. Four rookies (Colton Herta, Felix Rosenqvist, Santino Ferrucci, and Marcus Ericsson) passed all three phases of the rookie test – ten laps at 205–210 mph, ten laps at 210–215 mph, and ten laps over 215 mph. Herta led the rookie speed chart with a lap of 226.108 mph, and a "no-tow" laps of 223.121 mph (the fastest such of the entire day). The Refresher test, for veteran drivers who have not raced on a high-speed oval since the 2018 race, consists of the final two phases of the aforementioned rookie test. Drivers who raced in 2018 at Texas or Pocono were exempt. Conor Daly was the only participant that passed both the second and third phase. Fernando Alonso suffered electrical issues, and only managed to clear the second phase. Hélio Castroneves, J. R. Hildebrand, and Oriol Servià were also unable to complete both phases. An additional session of the Refresher/Rookie Orientation Program was scheduled from 1 p.m. to 3:00 p.m. on May 14.

Top Practice Speeds
Pos	No.	Driver	Team	Engine	Speed
1	30	(Japan) Takuma Sato	Rahal Letterman Lanigan Racing	Honda	226.993
2	20	(United States) Ed Carpenter	Ed Carpenter Racing	Chevrolet	226.414
3	21	(United States) Spencer Pigot	Ed Carpenter Racing	Chevrolet	226.325
OFFICIAL REPORT (1) OFFICIAL REPORT (2)

== Practice ==
=== Opening Day Practice – Tuesday May 14 ===
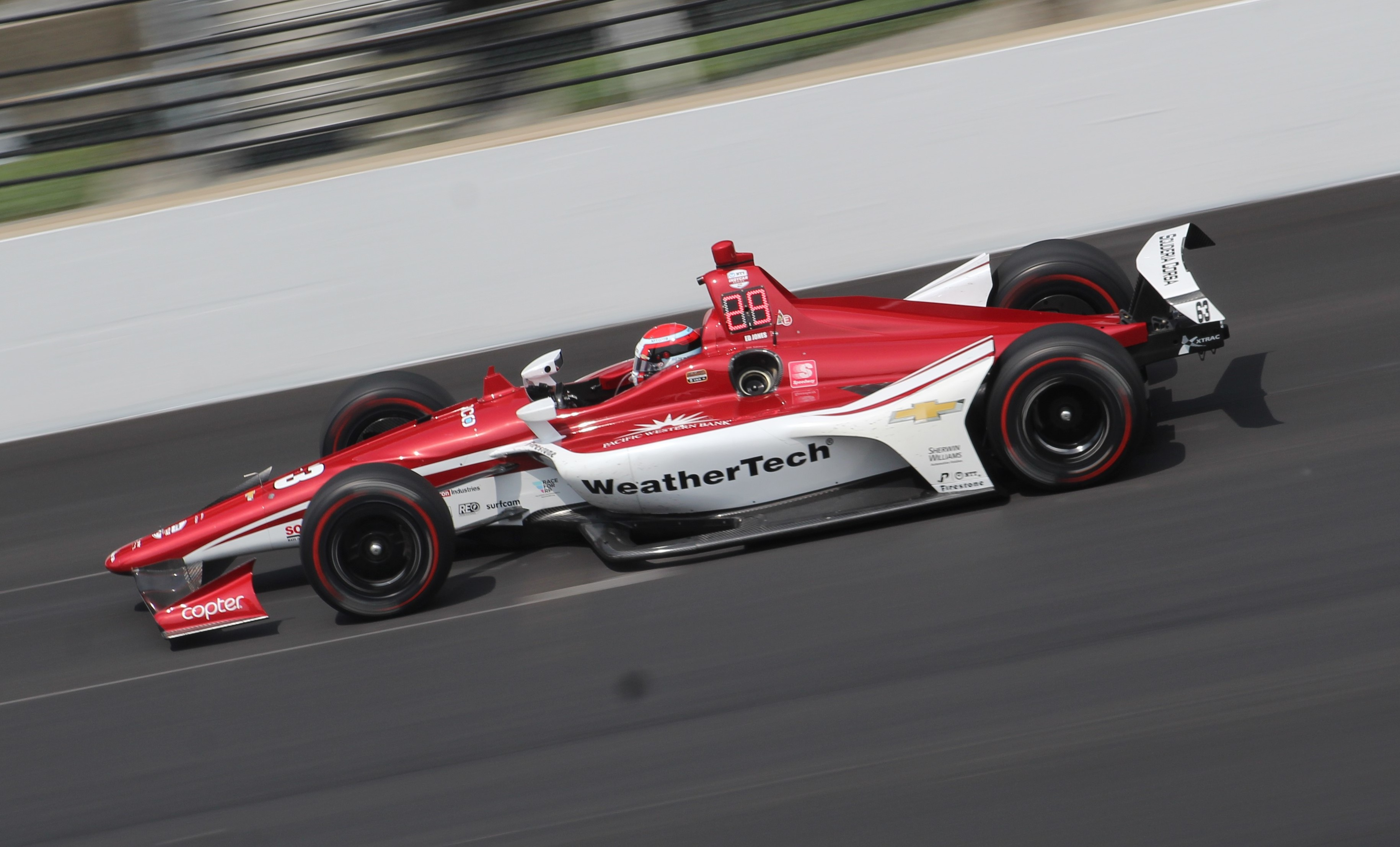
Ed Jones had the fastest "no-tow" speed on opening day.

- Weather: 69 °F (21 °C), Fair
- Summary: The opening day of practice saw all 36 cars turn laps around the circuit. Most drivers needing rookie/refresher testing completed their programs; however, rookie Patricio O'Ward suffered electrical issues in his car, preventing him from finishing his program. Fernando Alonso also suffered electrical issues on the day, preventing him taking part in much of the afternoon running. The fastest lap of the day belonged to Will Power, who turned a lap at 229.745 miles per hour (369.739 km/h), ahead of his Team Penske teammate Simon Pagenaud and Ed Carpenter Racing team boss Ed Carpenter. The fastest "no-tow" lap belonged to Ed Jones, who turned a lap at 224.542 miles per hour (361.365 km/h) without the aid of drafting. Only one minor incident occurred during the day, when rookie Colton Herta spun in the warm-up lane in turn 2, though he suffered no damage.

Top Practice Speeds
Pos	No.	Driver	Team	Engine	Speed
1	12	(Australia) Will Power	Team Penske	Chevrolet	229.745
2	22	(France) Simon Pagenaud	Team Penske	Chevrolet	229.703
3	20	(United States) Ed Carpenter	Ed Carpenter Racing	Chevrolet	228.653
OFFICIAL REPORT

=== Practice – Wednesday May 15 ===
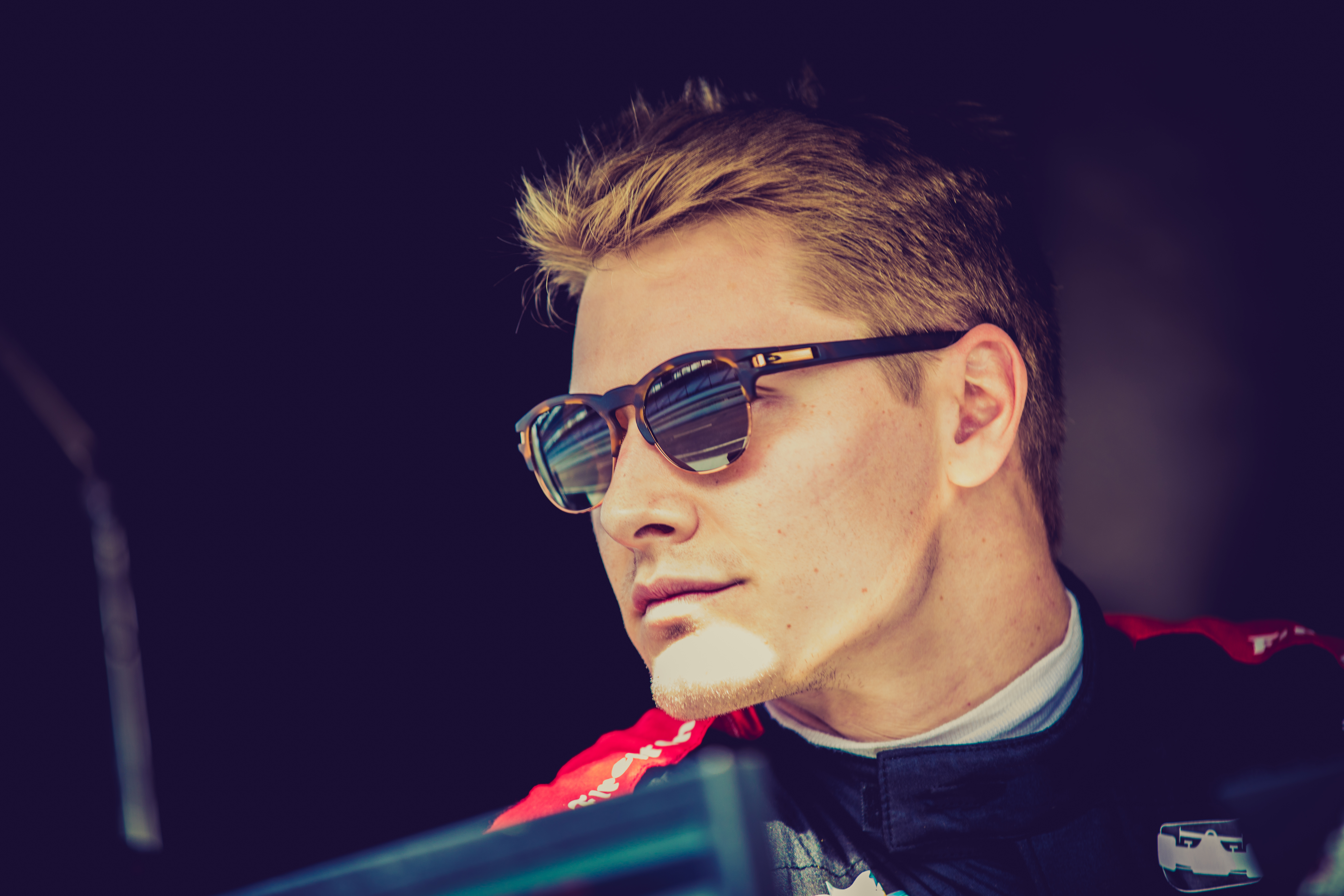
Josef Newgarden led the speed chart on Wednesday.

- Weather: 71 °F (22 °C), Partly cloudy
- Summary: The second day of practice opened with Patricio O'Ward completing his rookie test, allowing him to participate in open practice with the other competitors. The day saw the first two crashes of practice for the month. The first came at 12:35 pm, when Fernando Alonso hit the outside wall in turn three while following Graham Rahal. The car then slid across the track and hit the barriers on the inside of the north short chute before finally coming to a halt in turn four after tapping the outside wall. Alonso emerged uninjured, but the car was heavily damaged and the team did not return for the remainder of the day's practice. The second incident of the day came at 5:02 p.m. when Felix Rosenqvist lost control of his car in turn two while following Colton Herta. Rosenqvist's car spun before hitting the outside barrier, then slid into the tire wall at the inside of the track. Rosenqvist was uninjured, while the car needed significant repairs. Topping the speed charts for the day was Josef Newgarden who turned a lap at 228.856 miles per hour (368.308 km/h), besting Scott Dixon and Spencer Pigot. The fastest "no-tow" lap belonged to Alexander Rossi, who ran at 224.648 miles per hour (361.536 km/h) without the assistance of drafting. The field completed a total of 3,219 laps, with a considerable amount of "pack" racing observed.

Top Practice Speeds
Pos	No.	Driver	Team	Engine	Speed
1	2	(United States) Josef Newgarden	Team Penske	Chevrolet	228.856
2	9	(New Zealand) Scott Dixon	Chip Ganassi Racing	Honda	228.835
3	21	(United States) Spencer Pigot	Ed Carpenter Racing	Chevrolet	228.658
OFFICIAL REPORT

=== Practice – Thursday May 16 ===
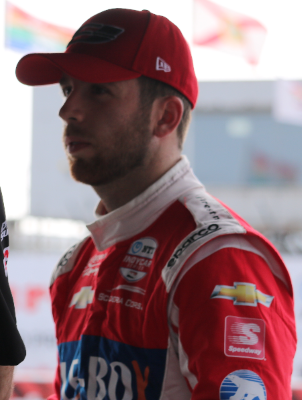
Ed Jones led the speed chart for the first time.

- Weather: 79 °F (26 °C), Mostly cloudy, thunderstorms late
- Summary: Thursday practice was shortened by 90 minutes due to rain. Despite this, 35 cars turned laps on the day, with only McLaren Racing being absent, still recovering from their accident the previous day. One major incident occurred at 12:18 p.m. when Patricio O'Ward lost control of his car in turn two and made heavy contact with the outside wall, sending the car airborne briefly before landing on its wheels and skidding to a halt part way down the backstretch. O'Ward was uninjured, but did not return to the track for the remainder of the day. Ed Jones was the fastest driver of the day, running a lap at 227.843 miles per hour (366.678 km/h) ahead of Takuma Sato and Zach Veach. Jones also held the fastest "no-tow" lap at 224.957 miles per hour (362.033 km/h). Only 1,717 laps were completed for the session, down from the previous day. With severe weather approaching the area, at 4:30 p.m. the yellow light was turned on and all cars were called off the track. The teams were sent to the garage area and the session was ended early, anticipating the storm.

Top Practice Speeds
Pos	No.	Driver	Team	Engine	Speed
1	63	(United Arab Emirates) Ed Jones	Ed Carpenter Racing Scuderia Corsa	Chevrolet	227.843
2	30	(Japan) Takuma Sato	Rahal Letterman Lanigan Racing	Honda	226.699
3	26	(United States) Zach Veach	Andretti Autosport	Honda	226.070
OFFICIAL REPORT

=== Fast Friday Practice – Friday May 17 ===
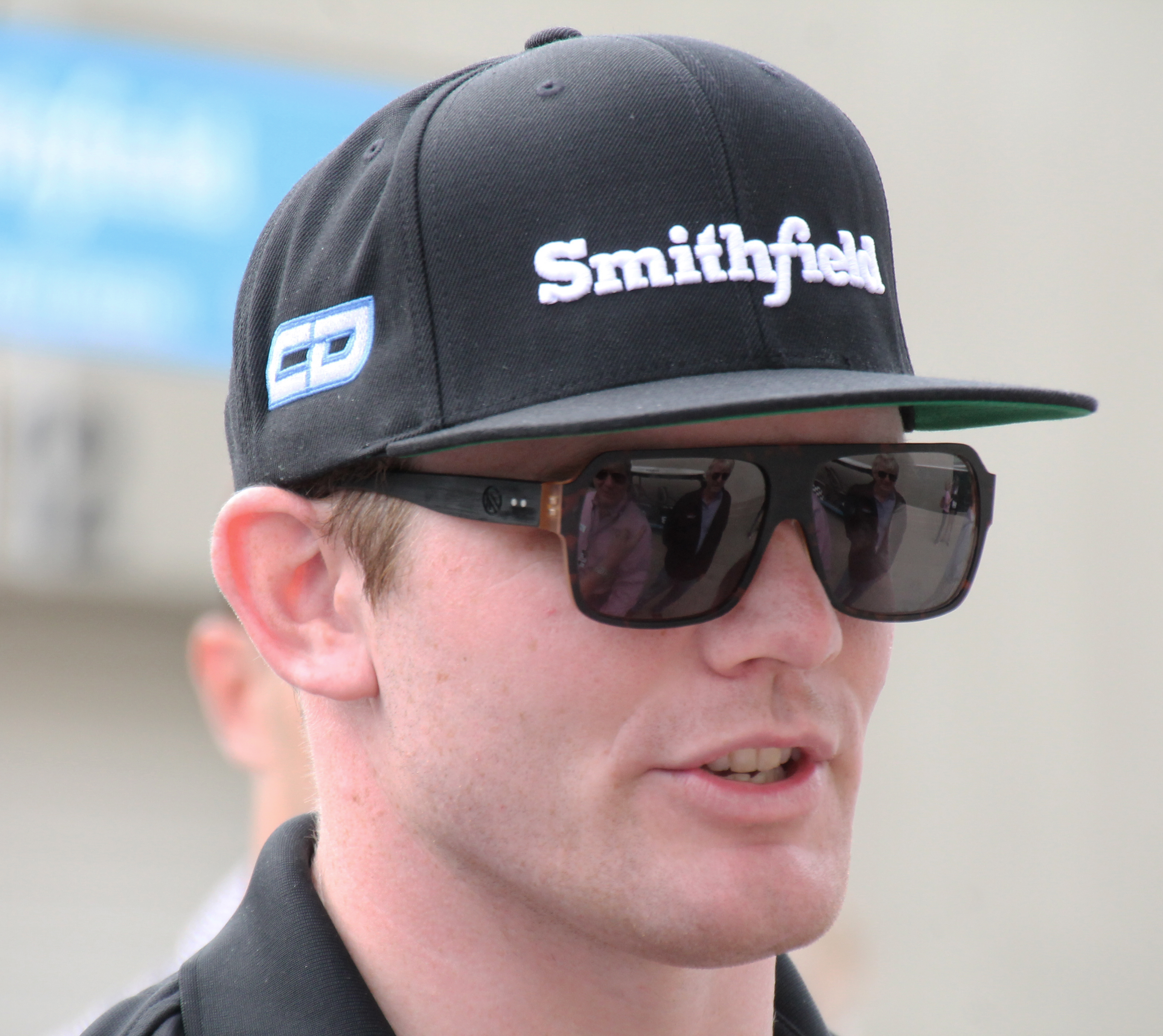
Conor Daly set the fastest practice lap of the week.

- Weather: 82 °F (28 °C), Mostly cloudy early with mid-day thunderstorms, sunny late
- Summary: Boost pressures were increased in preparation for qualifying weekend, leading to higher speeds than previous days. One major incident occurred at roughly noon, when Kyle Kaiser lost control in turn 3 and impacted the outside wall heavily, causing his car to become airborne briefly before landing upright. The incident placed the entry from Juncos Racing in doubt as to whether they would be able to appear for qualifying. The day also saw a stoppage due to weather, as lightning in the Speedway area halted running for roughly an hour. Conor Daly set the fastest time of Fast Friday, running a lap of 231.704 miles per hour (372.891 km/h) and besting Marco Andretti and Takuma Sato. Ed Jones headed the "no-tow" ranking for the third time in the week, posting a lap at 230.106 miles per hour (370.320 km/h) with no drafting aid.

Top Practice Speeds
Pos	No.	Driver	Team	Engine	Speed
1	25	(United States) Conor Daly	Andretti Autosport	Honda	231.704
2	98	(United States) Marco Andretti	Andretti Herta Autosport w/ Marco Andretti & Curb-Agajanian	Honda	230.851
3	30	(Japan) Takuma Sato	Rahal Letterman Lanigan Racing	Honda	230.755
OFFICIAL REPORT

== Time trials ==
=== Qualifying – Saturday May 18 ===
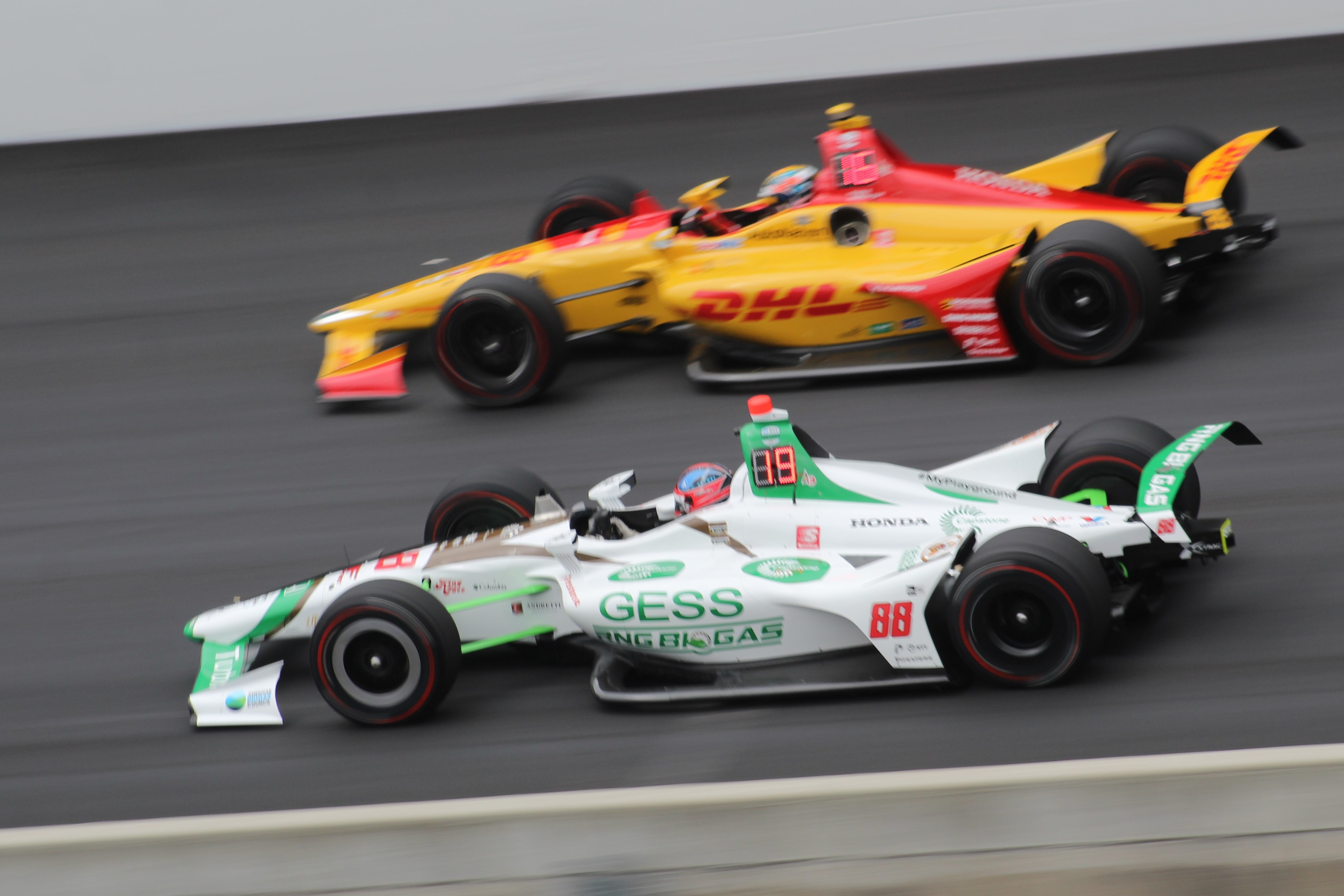
Colton Herta was the fastest rookie qualifier.

- Weather: 85 °F (29 °C), Sunny, winds up to 25 mph
- Summary: Time trials on Saturday determined the top thirty qualifiers which would be locked into the starting field. The nine fastest cars will subsequently advance to the Fast Nine Shootout scheduled for Sunday to determine the pole position. Spencer Pigot of Ed Carpenter Racing, who drew second in the qualifying order, set the fastest speed of the day at 230.083 mph. Will Power qualified second, falling short of the top spot by just 0.0011 seconds. Ed Jones turned in the fastest single qualifying lap (231.015 mph) and fastest trap speed (239.795 mph). However, his last two laps dropped off and he slipped to 6th in the final standings. High ambient and track temperatures, as well as gusting winds, made the search for speed difficult, particularly as the afternoon wore on.

On his first qualifying attempt, James Hinchcliffe, who failed to qualify in 2018, suffered a major crash in turn two. The driver lost control and did a half-spin, hitting the outside wall with the left side. Hinchcliffe was seen gingerly limping from the car, but did not suffer any major injuries. Later in the day, Hinchcliffe made three qualifying attempts in a back-up car, but failed to make the top 30. The other major story of the day involved Fernando Alonso. After struggling during practice all week, Alonso made five qualifying attempts yet failed to make the top 30. At the close of time trials, Alonso was ranked 31st, and was forced to participate in the Last Row Shootout.

The six cars that did not lock-in to the top 30 moved on to the Last Row Shootout, held the following day.

Pos	No.	Driver	Team	Engine	Speed
Fast Nine Qualifiers
1	21	(United States) Spencer Pigot	Ed Carpenter Racing	Chevrolet	230.083
2	12	(Australia) Will Power W	Team Penske	Chevrolet	230.081
3	22	(France) Simon Pagenaud	Team Penske	Chevrolet	229.854
4	2	(United States) Josef Newgarden	Team Penske	Chevrolet	229.749
5	88	(United States) Colton Herta R	Harding Steinbrenner Racing	Honda	229.478
6	63	(United Arab Emirates) Ed Jones	Ed Carpenter Racing Scuderia Corsa	Chevrolet	229.440
7	20	(United States) Ed Carpenter	Ed Carpenter Racing	Chevrolet	229.349
8	27	(United States) Alexander Rossi W	Andretti Autosport	Honda	229.268
9	18	(France) Sébastien Bourdais	Dale Coyne Racing with Vasser-Sullivan	Honda	228.800
Positions 10–33
10	98	(United States) Marco Andretti	Andretti Herta Autosport w/ Marco Andretti & Curb-Agajanian	Honda	228.756
11	25	(United States) Conor Daly	Andretti Autosport	Honda	228.617
12	3	(Brazil) Hélio Castroneves W	Team Penske	Chevrolet	228.523
13	7	(Sweden) Marcus Ericsson R	Arrow Schmidt Peterson Motorsports	Honda	228.511
14	30	(Japan) Takuma Sato W	Rahal Letterman Lanigan Racing	Honda	228.300
15	33	(Australia) James Davison	Dale Coyne Racing with Byrd/Hollinger/Belardi	Honda	228.273
16	14	(Brazil) Tony Kanaan W	A. J. Foyt Enterprises	Chevrolet	228.120
17	15	(United States) Graham Rahal	Rahal Letterman Lanigan Racing	Honda	228.104
18	9	(New Zealand) Scott Dixon W	Chip Ganassi Racing	Honda	228.100
19	77	(Spain) Oriol Servià	MotoGator Team Stange Racing with Arrow Schmidt Peterson	Honda	227.991
20	23	(United States) Charlie Kimball	Carlin	Chevrolet	227.915
21	48	(United States) J. R. Hildebrand	Dreyer & Reinbold Racing	Chevrolet	227.908
22	28	(United States) Ryan Hunter-Reay W	Andretti Autosport	Honda	227.877
23	19	(United States) Santino Ferrucci R	Dale Coyne Racing	Honda	227.731
24	4	(Brazil) Matheus Leist	A. J. Foyt Enterprises	Chevrolet	227.717
25	60	(United Kingdom) Jack Harvey	Meyer Shank Racing with Arrow Schmidt Peterson	Honda	227.695
26	42	(United Kingdom) Jordan King R	Rahal Letterman Lanigan Racing	Honda	227.502
27	81	(United Kingdom) Ben Hanley R	DragonSpeed	Chevrolet	227.482
28	26	(United States) Zach Veach	Andretti Autosport	Honda	227.341
29	10	(Sweden) Felix Rosenqvist R	Chip Ganassi Racing	Honda	227.297
30	39	(United Kingdom) Pippa Mann	Clauson-Marshall Racing	Chevrolet	227.244
Last Row Shootout
31	66	(Spain) Fernando Alonso	McLaren Racing	Chevrolet	227.224
32	5T	(Canada) James Hinchcliffe	Arrow Schmidt Peterson Motorsports	Honda	226.956
33	24	(United States) Sage Karam	Dreyer & Reinbold Racing	Chevrolet	226.951
34	31	(Mexico) Patricio O'Ward R	Carlin	Chevrolet	226.897
35	59	(United Kingdom) Max Chilton	Carlin	Chevrolet	226.321
36	32	(United States) Kyle Kaiser	Juncos Racing	Chevrolet	Time Withdrawn
OFFICIAL REPORT

=== Bump Day/Pole Day – Sunday May 19 ===
==== Last Row Shootout ====
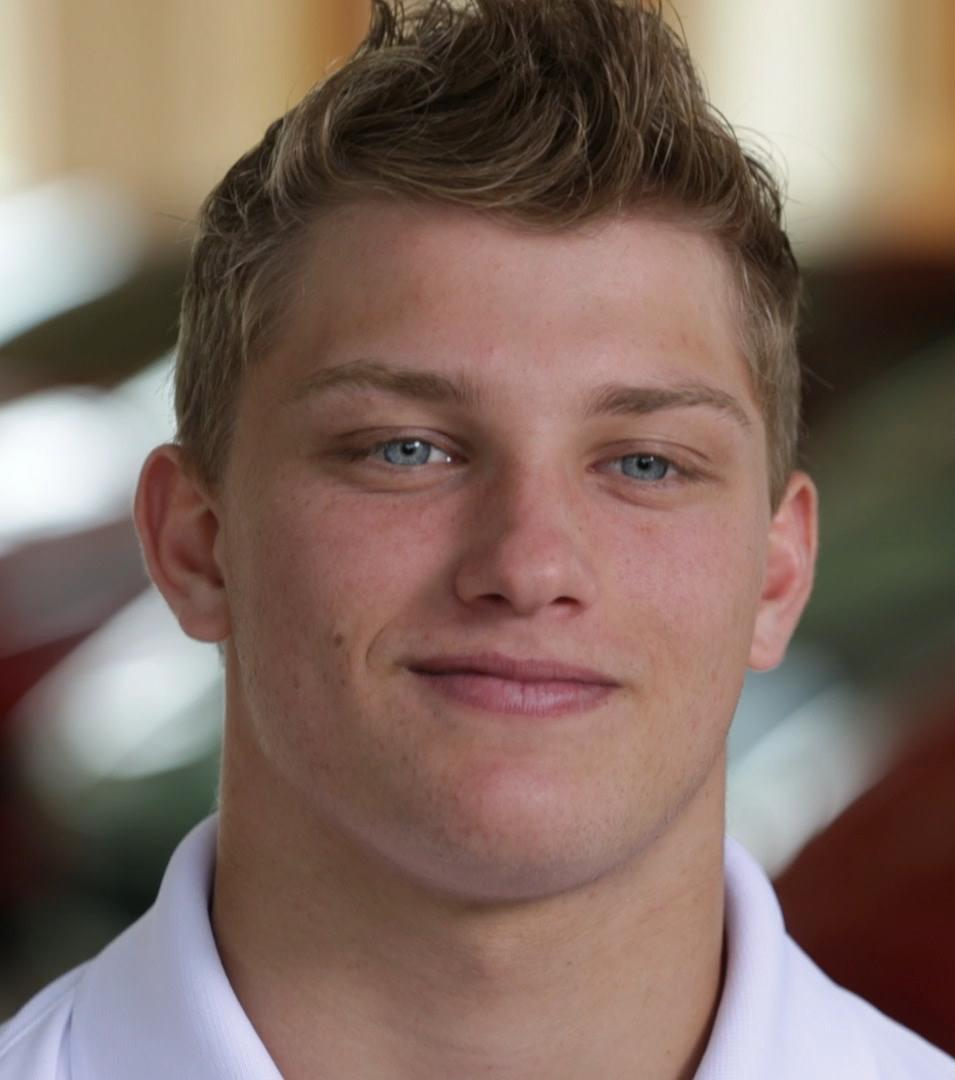
Sage Karam qualified 31st.

The six cars that failed to qualify on Saturday participated in the Last Row Shootout. Each car was permitted one qualifying attempt to fill positions 31–32–33. The three remaining cars would fail to qualify. Rain delayed the start of the Last Row Shootout until 4:30 pm. The teams had been permitted only a brief practice session Sunday morning before weather moved into the area.

After struggling during practice, and after managing only 33rd on Saturday, Sage Karam set the fastest speed of the session. After crashing and failing to make the top 30 on Saturday, James Hinchcliffe also qualified solidly. Fernando Alonso of McLaren found himself sitting on the bubble with only one car remaining in line. Second-year driver Kyle Kaiser of Juncos Racing was the final driver to make an attempt. Going into the month, the sponsorship for the Juncos team fell through. They suffered a crash in practice on Friday, and ranked last after Saturday's qualifying session. With zero practice laps on the day, Kaiser dramatically bumped out Alonso by 0.0129 seconds to make the starting field.

All three cars that failed to qualify were associated with Carlin (the McLaren entry was affiliated with Carlin). Charlie Kimball was the only Carlin entry to make the starting field (he had qualified 20th the day before and as such was not involved in the session). Despite an adequate budget, McLaren's effort with Fernando Alonso was riddled with mistakes, missteps, unpreparedness, and in hindsight was described as a "comedy of errors". During a test session at Texas, the team discovered they did not have a steering wheel. Later, a series of electrical issues cut into much-needed practice time. When Alonso crashed his primary car during practice, his backup car was not available because the team had sent it back to the paint shop when they realized it had been painted the wrong shade of orange. The painting gaffe cost the team two days of track time. One practice run on Sunday was aborted when the team realized they had made errors in their chassis setups from converting from imperial to metric units.

Pos	No.	Driver	Team	Engine	Speed
Last Row Qualifiers
31	24	(United States) Sage Karam	Dreyer & Reinbold Racing	Chevrolet	227.740
32	5T	(Canada) James Hinchcliffe	Arrow Schmidt Peterson Motorsports	Honda	227.543
33	32	(United States) Kyle Kaiser	Juncos Racing	Chevrolet	227.372
Failed to qualify
34	66	(Spain) Fernando Alonso	McLaren Racing	Chevrolet	227.353
35	31	(Mexico) Patricio O'Ward R	Carlin	Chevrolet	227.092
36	59	(United Kingdom) Max Chilton	Carlin	Chevrolet	226.192

==== Firestone Fast Nine Shootout ====
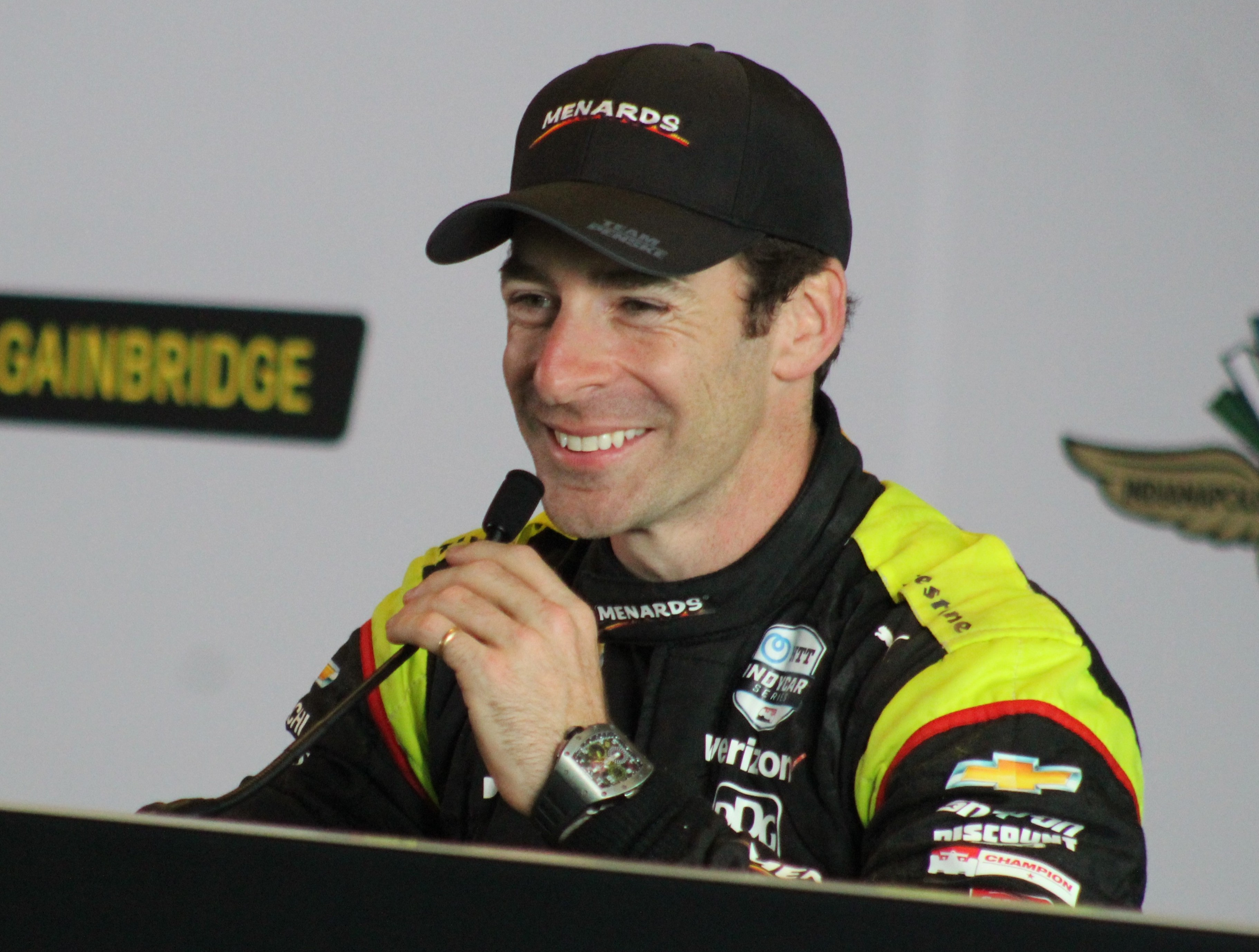
Simon Pagenaud won the pole position.

Team Penske won their record-extending 18th Indianapolis 500 pole position, as driver Simon Pagenaud took the top spot in the Fast Nine Shootout. Three-time polesitter Ed Carpenter was the third car out and set the pace early on with a four-lap average of 229.889 mph. Carpenter's fourth career pole, however, was not to be, as Pagenaud narrowly edged him out by 0.07 seconds. After a disappointing run by Will Power, which saw him drop from 2nd on Saturday to 6th on Sunday, Spencer Pigot was the last car with a chance for the pole. Pigot's first lap was quick, but his four-lap average dropped off and he qualified third.

Ed Carpenter Racing qualified 2nd–3rd–4th, one of the best combined time trials result for a three-car (or larger) race team. Penske Racing qualified 1st–2nd–3rd in 1988, and 1st–3rd–4th in 2010 and 2018. Andretti Autosport also qualified 2nd–3rd–4th in 2012–2013.

Because of the earlier rain, the scheduled practice after the Fast Nine Shootout was cancelled.

Pos	No.	Driver	Team	Engine	Speed
Firestone Fast Nine Qualifiers
1	22	(France) Simon Pagenaud	Team Penske	Chevrolet	229.992
2	20	(United States) Ed Carpenter	Ed Carpenter Racing	Chevrolet	229.889
3	21	(United States) Spencer Pigot	Ed Carpenter Racing	Chevrolet	229.826
4	63	(United Arab Emirates) Ed Jones	Ed Carpenter Racing Scuderia Corsa	Chevrolet	229.646
5	88	(United States) Colton Herta R	Harding Steinbrenner Racing	Honda	229.086
6	12	(Australia) Will Power W	Team Penske	Chevrolet	228.645
7	18	(France) Sébastien Bourdais	Dale Coyne Racing	Honda	228.621
8	2	(United States) Josef Newgarden	Team Penske	Chevrolet	228.396
9	27	(United States) Alexander Rossi W	Andretti Autosport	Honda	228.247
OFFICIAL REPORT

== Post-qualifying practice ==
=== Post-qualifying practice – Monday May 20 ===
- Weather: 63 °F (17 °C), partly sunny
- Summary: All 33 qualified cars took practice laps during the Post-qualifying practice session on Monday. Tony Kanaan took laps in both his own car and teammate Matheus Leist's car. The only minor incident of the day involved Marcus Ericsson. In heavy traffic, cars were two and three wide approaching turn three. Ericsson drifted high in turn three, and lightly brushed the outside wall in the north short chute. Polesitter Simon Pagenaud led the speed chart for the afternoon. The field completed 2,469 laps running most of the session in packs and simulating race conditions.

Top Practice Speeds
Pos	No.	Driver	Team	Engine	Speed
1	22	(France) Simon Pagenaud	Team Penske	Chevrolet	228.441
2	2	(United States) Josef Newgarden	Team Penske	Chevrolet	228.273
3	5	(Canada) James Hinchcliffe	Arrow Schmidt Peterson Motorsports	Honda	227.994
OFFICIAL REPORT

=== Carb Day – Friday May 24 ===
- Weather: 87 °F (31 °C), Mostly cloudy
- Practice summary: Carb Day served as the final practice before the race. The session saw mainly pack running in anticipation of the race, with no major incidents occurring. Tony Kanaan posted the best lap of the day at 225.517 miles per hour (362.934 km/h), besting rookie Santino Ferrucci and Takuma Sato. Later in the day, the annual pit stop competition occurred.

Top Practice Speeds
Pos	No.	Driver	Team	Engine	Speed
1	14	(Brazil) Tony Kanaan	A. J. Foyt Enterprises	Chevrolet	225.517
2	19	(United States) Santino Ferrucci R	Dale Coyne Racing	Honda	225.486
3	30	(Japan) Takuma Sato	Rahal Letterman Lanigan Racing	Honda	225.468
OFFICIAL REPORT

=== Pit Stop Challenge ===
The 42nd annual Pit Stop Challenge was held on May 24 following the Freedom 100 Indy Lights race. Victory in the event went to Arrow Schmidt Peterson Motorsports with Marcus Ericsson's No. 7 car. The team bested Chip Ganassi Racing's No. 9 car in a best of three final. The victory marked the first time since 2004 that a team other than Chip Ganassi Racing or Team Penske had done so.

First round
24	Sage Karam (Dreyer & Reinbold)	12.881
77	Oriol Servià (Schmidt Peterson)	13.338

Quarter-finals
24	Sage Karam (Dreyer & Reinbold)	14.550
9	Scott Dixon (Chip Ganassi Racing)	13.935
30	Takuma Sato (Rahal Letterman)	13.261
5	James Hinchcliffe (Schmidt Peterson)	13.153
7	Marcus Ericsson (Schmidt Peterson)	13.231
2	Josef Newgarden (Team Penske)	13.642
10	Felix Rosenqvist (Chip Ganassi Racing)	14.389 (+5)
12	Will Power (Team Penske)	14.625

Semi-finals
9	Scott Dixon (Chip Ganassi Racing)	32.537
5	James Hinchcliffe (Schmidt Peterson)	33.050
7	Marcus Ericsson (Schmidt Peterson)	12.692
12	Will Power (Team Penske)	14.619

Finals (best of 3)
9	Scott Dixon (Chip Ganassi Racing)	12.678	12.219	13.132	1
7	Marcus Ericsson (Schmidt Peterson)	11.912	14.648	11.794	2

== Starting grid ==
Row	Inside		Middle		Outside	
1	22	(France) Simon Pagenaud	20	(United States) Ed Carpenter	21	(United States) Spencer Pigot
2	63	(United Arab Emirates) Ed Jones	88	(United States) Colton Herta R	12	(Australia) Will Power W
3	18	(France) Sébastien Bourdais	2	(United States) Josef Newgarden	27	(United States) Alexander Rossi W
4	98	(United States) Marco Andretti	25	(United States) Conor Daly	3	(Brazil) Hélio Castroneves W
5	7	(Sweden) Marcus Ericsson R	30	(Japan) Takuma Sato W	33	(Australia) James Davison
6	14	(Brazil) Tony Kanaan W	15	(United States) Graham Rahal	9	(New Zealand) Scott Dixon W
7	77	(Spain) Oriol Servià	23	(United States) Charlie Kimball	48	(United States) J. R. Hildebrand
8	28	(United States) Ryan Hunter-Reay W	19	(United States) Santino Ferrucci R	4	(Brazil) Matheus Leist
9	60	(United Kingdom) Jack Harvey	42	(United Kingdom) Jordan King R	81	(United Kingdom) Ben Hanley R
10	26	(United States) Zach Veach	10	(Sweden) Felix Rosenqvist R	39	(United Kingdom) Pippa Mann
11	24	(United States) Sage Karam	5	(Canada) James Hinchcliffe	32	(United States) Kyle Kaiser

Failed to qualify

No.	Driver	Team	Reason
66	(Spain) Fernando Alonso	McLaren Racing	Fourth fastest in last row shootout. Bumped from the field.
31	(Mexico) Patricio O'Ward (R) (Note: O'Ward, although entered as an NTT IndyCar Series rookie, was not credited as a rookie for this event. As he returned to the Indianapolis 500 in 2020, he retook all phases of the Indianapolis 500 rookie test and was declared eligible for all rookie awards.)	Carlin	Fifth fastest in last row shootout. Bumped from the field.
59	(United Kingdom) Max Chilton	Carlin	Sixth fastest in last row shootout. Bumped from the field.

R = Indianapolis 500 rookie
W = Former Indianapolis 500 winner

== Race summary ==
=== First half ===
Race day saw a high temperature of 82 °F (28 °C) with overcast skies for most of the race. Despite forecasts of thunderstorms throughout the day, the race was unaffected by precipitation.

The start saw Simon Pagenaud pull out to the lead, with Ed Carpenter and Will Power behind. The first green flag run was short lived, with the first caution period coming after just four laps, when Colton Herta came to a halt at the exit of turn 4; a gearbox failure causing a quick end to the rookie's race. Racing resumed on lap 10, with Power moving into second place ahead of Carpenter, with Spencer Pigot running fourth. This order would remain intact until the first stops of the race, which began at lap 32. After the stops, the top 3 remained the same, while Josef Newgarden moved to fourth. During the pit sequence, Hélio Castroneves and James Davison collided in the pit lane, resulting in Davison spinning. Castroneves was handed a drive-through penalty for the incident. At lap 54, Ben Hanley became the race's second retirement, as a broken halfshaft brought an end to the DragonSpeed car's day, though Hanley managed to bring the car back to pit lane without the need for a caution period.

The second round of stops came beginning at lap 62, though just before this, Carpenter managed to get back around Power for second. Scott Dixon led his first laps of the day during this period, having saved enough fuel to stay out until lap 71. During this pit sequence, Jordan King was involved in a pit lane incident where he slid long in his box at hit one of his tire changers; the crew member suffered a leg injury and was transported to a local hospital. Just as the pit sequence ended, the second caution of the day came, as Kyle Kaiser crashed his car in turn 4, ending the day for the Juncos Racing entry. During the caution, Power was moved to the back of the field as a penalty for hitting one of his pit crew members during his previous pit stop. The running order now ran Pagenaud, Carpenter, Alexander Rossi, Newgarden, and Sébastien Bourdais.

Racing resumed at lap 78 with the running order remaining largely the same until the next round of pit stops, starting around lap 99. Rossi led his first laps of the day during the pit sequence after managing to stay out until lap 106, but a slower pit stop dropped him back behind Newgarden and Bourdais. Scott Dixon led again, staying out to lap 111.

=== Second half ===
Despite the slow stop, Alexander Rossi quickly climbed back up the order, and by lap 112 was in second place and fighting with leader Simon Pagenaud. The two remained close until the next round of stops, beginning at lap 128. Rossi suffered an even slower pit stop when he came in on lap 136 when the fuel nozzle failed to engage properly. Rossi was saved from falling well off the leader by the race's third caution flag. Behind Rossi, Marcus Ericsson spun coming into the pit lane, making contact with the wall with the nose of the car. Though Ericsson's car was not damaged enough to end his race, the car had stalled and needed retrieval, necessitating the caution period. Those who had not yet stopped, including Scott Dixon, were forced to pit during the caution, placing them behind those who had already stopped. As the field prepared for the next restart, the running order was Pagenaud, Carpenter, Newgarden, Bourdais, and Rossi.

Racing resumed at lap 148. Soon after, Josef Newgarden passed Carpenter for second and then successfully stole the lead away from his teammate Pagenaud. Pagenaud elected to stay behind Newgarden for several laps in an effort to conserve fuel and make it to the end on only one more pit stop. This lasted until lap 168, when Pagenaud passed Newgarden back just before pitting again and triggering the final round of pit stops. During the sequence, Rossi was able to jump past both Newgarden and third place Ed Carpenter thanks to the advantage of an undercut. Soon after, Rossi passed Pagenaud for the virtual lead of the race while an off sequence Spencer Pigot led. Just as this happened, caution came for the fourth and final time of the day for a multi-pile up in turn 3. Graham Rahal and Sébastien Bourdais made contact entering the turn, causing them to crash. Behind them, Felix Rosenqvist, Zach Veach, and Charlie Kimball also lost control of their cars trying to avoid the incident. Of the five cars involved, Kimball was the only one able to continue on with the race. Scott Dixon also received minor damage in the incident. Due to the lengthy necessary clean up, the race was red flagged. Bourdais was deemed to be at fault for the incident, and was handed a 30-second avoidable contact penalty, relegating him to a 30th-place finish, placed behind all other drivers involved in the crash.

=== Finish ===
After roughly 18 minutes, cars returned to the track, with the top five following Pigot's pit stop being Rossi, Pagenaud, Carpenter, Newgarden, and Takuma Sato, who had finally recovered from trouble during his first pit stop. Racing resumed at lap 186, with Pagenaud immediately passing Rossi in turn 1 to reclaim the lead. The two exchanged places again the next lap before Pagenaud again reclaimed the lead, with the battle cooling down for a few laps. Behind them, Sato managed to pass both Carpenter and Newgarden, placing the former winner suddenly in contention for victory. With three laps to go, Rossi retook the lead of the race, but one lap later, Pagenaud moved back around Rossi with a pass into turn 3. Despite Rossi's efforts to reel him back in on the final lap, Pagenaud held on to take victory. The final margin of victory was 0.2 seconds, the seventh closest in the history of the race.

Pagenaud's victory marked the first time since 1920 that a French-born driver had won the race. It was the elusive first Indianapolis 500 win for longtime IndyCar sponsor John Menard Jr. It also marked the first time since 2009 that the pole sitter had won. For winning, Pagenaud earned $2,669,529 out of a total purse of $13,090,536. Rookie of the Year honors went to Santino Ferrucci, who finished seventh in his Indy 500 debut.

== Box score ==
Finish	No.	Driver	Team	Chassis	Engine	Laps	Status	Pit Stops	Grid	Pts.^{1}
1	22	(France) Simon Pagenaud	Team Penske	Dallara UAK18	Chevrolet	200	175.794 mph	6	1	112
2	27	(United States) Alexander Rossi W	Andretti Autosport	Dallara UAK18	Honda	200	+0.2086	6	9	82
3	30	(Japan) Takuma Sato W	Rahal Letterman Lanigan Racing	Dallara UAK18	Honda	200	+0.3413	8	14	71
4	2	(United States) Josef Newgarden	Team Penske	Dallara UAK18	Chevrolet	200	+0.8979	6	8	67
5	12	(Australia) Will Power W	Team Penske	Dallara UAK18	Chevrolet	200	+1.6173	6	6	65
6	20	(United States) Ed Carpenter	Ed Carpenter Racing	Dallara UAK18	Chevrolet	200	+1.9790	6	2	65
7	19	(United States) Santino Ferrucci R	Dale Coyne Racing	Dallara UAK18	Chevrolet	200	+2.8055	6	23	53
8	28	(United States) Ryan Hunter-Reay W	Andretti Autosport	Dallara UAK18	Honda	200	+4.0198	6	22	48
9	14	(Brazil) Tony Kanaan W	A. J. Foyt Enterprises	Dallara UAK18	Chevrolet	200	+4.7708	8	16	44
10	25	(United States) Conor Daly	Andretti Autosport	Dallara UAK18	Honda	200	+5.3459	6	11	40
11	5	(Canada) James Hinchcliffe	Arrow Schmidt Peterson Motorsports	Dallara UAK18	Honda	200	+5.4821	8	32	38
12	33	(Australia) James Davison	Dale Coyne Racing with Byrd/Hollinger/Belardi	Dallara UAK18	Honda	200	+6.2250	6	15	36
13	63	(United Arab Emirates) Ed Jones	Ed Carpenter Racing Scuderia Corsa	Dallara UAK18	Chevrolet	200	+7.5500	8	4	40
14	21	(United States) Spencer Pigot	Ed Carpenter Racing	Dallara UAK18	Chevrolet	200	+8.5566	8	3	40
15	4	(Brazil) Matheus Leist	A. J. Foyt Enterprises	Dallara UAK18	Chevrolet	200	+10.4153	7	24	30
16	39	(United Kingdom) Pippa Mann	Clauson-Marshall Racing	Dallara UAK18	Chevrolet	200	+12.9803	6	30	28
17	9	(New Zealand) Scott Dixon W	Chip Ganassi Racing	Dallara UAK18	Honda	200	+14.7595	7	18	27
18	3	(Brazil) Hélio Castroneves W	Team Penske	Dallara UAK18	Chevrolet	199	−1 Lap	9	12	24
19	24	(United States) Sage Karam	Dreyer & Reinbold Racing	Dallara UAK18	Chevrolet	199	−1 Lap	8	31	22
20	48	(United States) J. R. Hildebrand	Dreyer & Reinbold Racing	Dallara UAK18	Chevrolet	199	−1 Lap	9	21	20
21	60	(United Kingdom) Jack Harvey	Meyer Shank Racing with Arrow Schmidt Peterson	Dallara UAK18	Honda	199	−1 Lap	9	25	18
22	77	(Spain) Oriol Servià	MotoGator Team Stange Racing with Arrow Schmidt Peterson	Dallara UAK18	Honda	199	−1 Lap	7	19	16
23	7	(Sweden) Marcus Ericsson R	Arrow Schmidt Peterson Motorsports	Dallara UAK18	Honda	198	−2 Laps	8	13	14
24	42	(United Kingdom) Jordan King R	Rahal Letterman Lanigan Racing	Dallara UAK18	Honda	198	−2 Laps	8	26	12
25	23	(United States) Charlie Kimball	Carlin	Dallara UAK18	Chevrolet	196	−4 Laps	7	20	10
26	98	(United States) Marco Andretti	Andretti Herta Autosport w/ Marco Andretti & Curb-Agajanian	Dallara UAK18	Honda	195	−5 Laps	12	10	10
27	15	(United States) Graham Rahal	Rahal Letterman Lanigan Racing	Dallara UAK18	Honda	176	Crash	5	17	10
28	10	(Sweden) Felix Rosenqvist R	Chip Ganassi Racing	Dallara UAK18	Honda	176	Crash	6	29	11
29	26	(United States) Zach Veach	Andretti Autosport	Dallara UAK18	Honda	176	Crash	5	28	10
30	18	(France) Sébastien Bourdais	Dale Coyne Racing with Vasser-Sullivan	Dallara UAK18	Honda	176	Crash	5	7	13
31	32	(United States) Kyle Kaiser	Juncos Racing	Dallara UAK18	Chevrolet	71	Crash	2	33	10
32	81	(United Kingdom) Ben Hanley R	DragonSpeed	Dallara UAK18	Chevrolet	54	Driveshaft	1	27	10
33	88	(United States) Colton Herta R	Harding Steinbrenner Racing	Dallara UAK18	Honda	3	Gearbox	0	5	15
OFFICIAL BOX SCORE

W Former Indianapolis 500 winner

R Indianapolis 500 Rookie

All entrants used Firestone tires.

^{1} Points include qualification points from Time Trials, 1 point for leading a lap, and 2 points for most laps led.

=== Race statistics ===
Lap Leaders
Laps	Leader
1–31	Simon Pagenaud
32–34	Will Power
35	Ed Carpenter
36–37	Takuma Sato
38–41	Felix Rosenqvist
42–63	Simon Pagenaud
64–66	Ed Carpenter
67	Will Power
68–69	Alexander Rossi
70–72	Scott Dixon
73–98	Simon Pagenaud
99–100	Ed Carpenter
101	Josef Newgarden
102–105	Alexander Rossi
106–110	Scott Dixon
111–112	Felix Rosenqvist
113–128	Simon Pagenaud
129–137	Alexander Rossi
138–142	Scott Dixon
143–150	Simon Pagenaud
151–170	Josef Newgarden
171	Ed Carpenter
172	Santino Ferrucci
173–175	Will Power
176	Takuma Sato
177–180	Spencer Pigot
181–186	Alexander Rossi
187–197	Simon Pagenaud
198	Alexander Rossi
199–200	Simon Pagenaud

Total laps led
Driver	Laps
Simon Pagenaud	115
Alexander Rossi	22
Josef Newgarden	21
Scott Dixon	13
Will Power	7
Ed Carpenter	7
Felix Rosenqvist	6
Spencer Pigot	4
Takuma Sato	3
Santino Ferrucci	1

Cautions: 4 for 29 laps
Laps	Reason
6–9	Colton Herta stalled on track
73–78	Kyle Kaiser contact in Turn 4
138–147	Marcus Ericsson contact in pit lane
178–186	Rosenqvist, Rahal, Bourdais, Kimball, Veach crash in turn 3 (red flag)

== Broadcasting ==
=== Television ===
NBC televised the race in the United States, having assumed the broadcast rights as part of a new, three-year deal to televise the entire IndyCar Series, replacing ABC for the first time since 1965 (NBCSN held cable rights over the previous contract, but selected races, including the Indianapolis 500, were part of a separate package sold to ABC). The race was called by NBC's commentary team of Leigh Diffey, Townsend Bell, and Paul Tracy. Mike Tirico served as on-air host for pre-race coverage, joined by Danica Patrick and Dale Earnhardt Jr. as analysts. Dillon Welch, whose father was a former ESPN pit reporter for the Indianapolis 500, was also a reporter.

Portions of pre-race activities were exclusive to NBC Sports Gold's IndyCar Pass subscription, including most practice sessions and all of the first day of qualifying with the final hour simulcast by NBCSN along with the entirety of Carb Day also simulcast. Bump and Pole Day were exclusive to NBCSN; while NBC had a scheduled window, the session was delayed due to rain, and NBC had commitments to air an NHL playoff game. The season-long broadcast team of Jake Query, Anders Krohn, and Katie Hargitt covered the Indy Lights Freedom 100. NBCSN broadcast a two-hour pre-race show and a one-hour post-race show on race day.

The 2019 Indianapolis 500 saw an average of 5.4 million viewers, and a 3.9 overnight rating—a 15% increase over the 2018 edition (which was the least-viewed 500 since the introduction of live flag-to-flag coverage).

NBC
Booth Announcers	Pre/Post-Race	Pit/garage reporters
Announcer: Leigh Diffey; Color: Townsend Bell; Color: Paul Tracy	NBC Host: Mike Tirico; NBCSN Host: Krista Voda; Studio Analyst: Danica Patrick; Analyst/Features: Dale Earnhardt Jr. Features: Rutledge Wood	Marty Snider; Kelli Stavast; Kevin Lee; Jon Beekhuis; Robin Miller (Reporter/Features); Dillon Welch (Reporter)

=== Radio ===
The race was carried by the Indianapolis Motor Speedway Radio Network. Mark Jaynes served as the chief announcer or "Voice of the 500" for the fourth consecutive year. For 2019, the booth announcers moved to a new location. The IMS Radio Network took over the studio formerly occupied by ABC television, on the second floor of the Pagoda renamed the Sid Collins Booth. NBC took over the booth high atop the Pagoda which the radio crew used to use. As a result, the chief announcer no longer had a clear view of turn one, and the separate turn one announcer (which was left vacant multiple times in the past several years) was brought back once again. Nick Yeoman took the prestigious turn one reporting location, as Jerry Baker was now permanently retired from the crew but was working with the public address department.

1070 The Fan broadcast nightly with Trackside with Curt Cavin and Kevin Lee, followed by Donald Davidson's The Talk of Gasoline Alley.

Indianapolis Motor Speedway Radio Network
Booth Announcers	Turn Reporters	Pit/garage reporters
Chief Announcer: Mark Jaynes; Driver expert: Anders Krohn; Historian: Donald Davidson	Turn 1: Nick Yeoman; Turn 2: Michael Young; Turn 3: Jake Query; Turn 4: Chris Denari	Rob Howden; Dave Furst; Ryan Myrehn; Rob Blackman; Dave Wilson (Garages/Hospital)

Previous race: 2019 IndyCar Grand Prix	IndyCar Series; 2019 season	Next race: 2019 Chevrolet Detroit Grand Prix
Previous race: 2018 Indianapolis 500	Indianapolis 500	Next race: 2020 Indianapolis 500
