= Team Stange Racing =

American NASCAR racing team

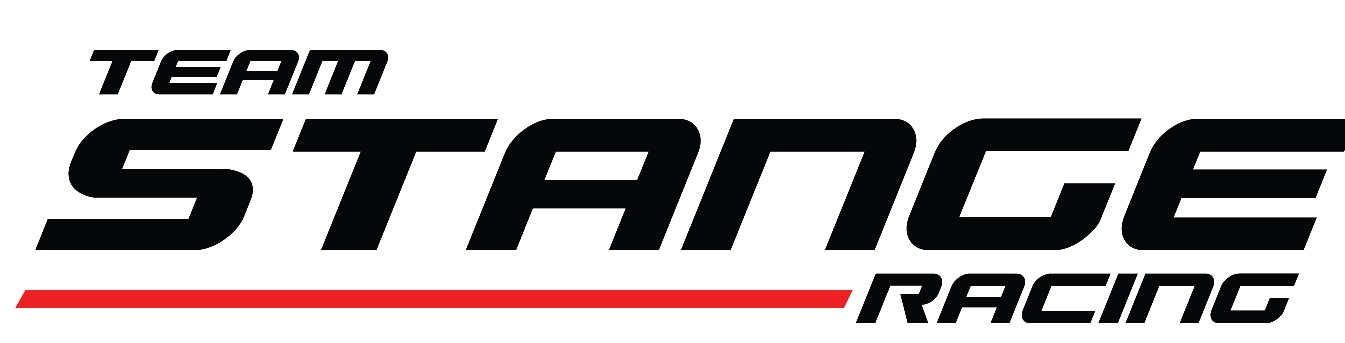
- Owner: John Stange Jr.
- Base: Chicago, Illinois
- Series: NASCAR O'Reilly Auto Parts Series
- Race drivers: 47. Dawson Cram, Carson Ware (part-time)
- Manufacturer: Chevrolet
- Opened: 2012

Career
- Debut: O'Reilly Auto Parts Series: 2026 Cuervo 300 (Chicagoland); ARCA Racing Series: 2014 Lucas Oil 200 (Daytona); K&N Pro Series East: 2015 The Hart to Heart Breast Cancer Foundation 150 (New Smyrna); K&N Pro Series West: 2015 NAPA Auto Parts Wildcat 150 (Tucson); IndyCar Series: 2019 Indianapolis 500 (Indianapolis)
- Latest race: O'Reilly Auto Parts Series: 2026 Cuervo 300 (Chicagoland); ARCA Racing Series: 2016 Lucas Oil 200 (Daytona); K&N Pro Series East: 2015 #ThanksKenny 150 (Iowa); K&N Pro Series West: 2015 NAPA Auto Parts Wildcat 150 (Tucson); IndyCar Series: 2019 Indianapolis 500 (Indianapolis)
- Races competed: Total: 16; O'Reilly Auto Parts Series: 1 ARCA Racing Series: 6 K&N Pro Series East: 7 K&N Pro Series West: 1 IndyCar Series: 1
- Drivers' Championships: Total: 0 O'Reilly Auto Parts Series: 0 ARCA Racing Series: 0 K&N Pro Series East: 0 K&N Pro Series West: 0 IndyCar Series: 0
- Race victories: Total: 0 O'Reilly Auto Parts Series: 0 ARCA Racing Series: 0 K&N Pro Series East: 0 K&N Pro Series West: 0 IndyCar Series: 0
- Pole positions: Total: 0 O'Reilly Auto Parts Series: 0 ARCA Racing Series: 0 K&N Pro Series East: 0 K&N Pro Series West: 0 IndyCar Series: 0

Team Stange Racing is an American racing team that competes part-time in the NASCAR O'Reilly Auto Parts Series, fielding the No. 47 Chevrolet Camaro for Dawson Cram in conjunction with Mike Harmon Racing. The team had also previously competed in the IndyCar Series with MotorGator as a sponsor and with Arrow Schmidt Peterson Motorsports as technical team. With Oriol Servià driving, they qualified for the 2019 Indianapolis 500 starting 19th place and finishing in 22nd place.

== NASCAR Cup Series ==
In March 2022, Team Stange announced that they would field a part-time entry in the NASCAR Cup Series, the No. 79 Ford Mustang GT, beginning at Road America. Tarso Marques was announced as the team's driver. The team's remaining schedule will consist of the Verizon 200 at the Brickyard, Watkins Glen 355, Coke Zero Sugar 400, Bank of America Roval 400, South Point 400, Dixie Vodka 400, and the season finale NASCAR Cup Series Championship Race. Sponsorship will come from crypto currency Dignity Gold. Nothing has been heard from the team since then, and they ended up not running at all in 2022.

== O'Reilly Auto Parts Series ==
=== Car No. 47 history ===
Team Stange intended to race at the 2022 Pennzoil 150 in the Xfinity Series for approval to race in the Go Bowling at The Glen at Watkins Glen International but were not approved to race in the Xfinity Series at Indianapolis Motor Speedway.

On June 26, 2026, it was announced that the team would form partnership with Mike Harmon Racing to field the No. 47 for Dawson Cram at Chicagoland.

==== Car No. 47 results ====
Year	Driver	No.	Make	1	2	3	4	5	6	7	8	9	10	11	12	13	14	15	16	17	18	19	20	21	22	23	24	25	26	27	28	29	30	31	32	33	Owners	Pts
2026	Dawson Cram	47	Chevy	DAY	ATL	COA	PHO	LVS	DAR	MAR	CAR	BRI	KAN	TAL	TEX	GLN	DOV	CLT	NSH	POC	COR	SON	CHI; 38	ATL	IND	IOW	DAY	DAR	GTW	BRI	LVS	CLT	PHO	TAL	MAR	HOM		

== Camping World Truck Series ==
In 2022, Team Stange was also announced that they would run a NASCAR Camping World Truck Series race at Sonoma Raceway, although they would end up not entering that particular race.

== ARCA Racing Series ==
=== Car No. 46 history ===
Team Stange Racing debuted in the ARCA Racing Series in the 2014 season, with Maryeve Dufault behind the wheel of No. 46 car.

In 2016, the team fielded the No. 46 for Frank Kimmel at Daytona.

After a five-year absence from the series, the team would announce a return to the series in 2022 with Matteo Nannini driving a part time No. 46 entry beginning at Mid-Ohio Sports Car Course in July. However, they did not show up at Mid-Ohio.

==== Car No. 46 results ====
Year	Driver	No.	Make	1	2	3	4	5	6	7	8	9	10	11	12	13	14	15	16	17	18	19	20	Owners	Pts
2014	Maryeve Dufault	46	Ford	DAY; 18	MOB; 17	SLM	TAL; 25	TOL	NJE	POC	MCH	ELK	WIN	CHI	IRP	POC	BLN	ISF	MAD	DSF	SLM	KEN	KAN		
2016	Frank Kimmel	46	Ford	DAY; 5	NSH	SLM	TAL	TOL	NJE	POC	MCH	MAD	WIN	IOW	IRP	POC	BLN	ISF	DSF	SLM	CHI	KEN	KAN		

=== Car No. 47 history ===
In 2014, the team fielded the No. 47 as a second entry for Buster Graham and Christian Celaya as drivers.

==== Car No. 47 results ====
Year	Driver	No.	Make	1	2	3	4	5	6	7	8	9	10	11	12	13	14	15	16	17	18	19	20	Owners	Pts
2014	Buster Graham	47	Ford	DAY	MOB	SLM	TAL	TOL	NJE	POC	MCH	ELK	WIN	CHI; 16	IRP	POC	BLN	ISF							
2014	Christian Celaya	47	Ford																MAD; 16	DSF	SLM	KEN	KAN		

== K&N Pro Series East ==
=== Car No. 45 history ===
In the 2015 season, the team competed in the NASCAR K&N Pro Series East with Christian Celaya behind the wheel of the No. 45 car.

In 2016, the team entered the No. 45 at Greenville-Pickens Speedway with John Gustafson behind the wheel.

==== Car No. 45 results ====
Year	Driver	No.	Make	1	2	3	4	5	6	7	8	9	10	11	12	13	14	Owners	Pts
2015	Christian Celaya	45	Chevy	NSM; 19	GRE; 21	BRI	IOW; 16	BGS; 21	LGY; 22	COL; 22	NHA								
2015	Mike Senica	45	Chevy									IOW; 21	GLN	MOT	VIR	RCH	DOV		

=== Car No. 47 history ===
In 2015, the team fielded the No. 47 as a second entry with Mike Senica behind the wheel.

==== Car No. 47 results ====
Year	Driver	No.	Make	1	2	3	4	5	6	7	8	9	10	11	12	13	14	Owners	Pts
2015	Mike Senica	47	Chevy	NSM	GRE; 24	BRI	IOW	BGS	LGY	COL; 20	NHA	IOW	GLN	MOT	VIR	RCH	DOV		

== K&N Pro Series West ==
=== Car No. 22 history ===
In the 2015 season, the team competed in the NASCAR K&N Pro Series West with Christian Celaya behind the wheel of the No. 22 car.

==== Car No. 22 results ====
Year	Driver	No.	Make	1	2	3	4	5	6	7	8	9	10	11	12	13	Owners	Pts
2015	Christian Celaya	22	Chevy	KCR	IRW	TUS; 19	IOW	SHA	SON	SLS	IOW	EVG	CNS	MER	AAS	PHO		

== IndyCar Series ==
On May 13, 2019, Sam Schmidt, John Stange Jr. and Team Stange Racing with MotorGator as the main sponsor and Arrow Schmidt Peterson Motorsports as the technical team, presents the Spanish veteran Oriol Servià as driver for the car with No. 77.

Having an experience of 10 editions of Indy 500, Servia managed to qualify for the race in the 19th place and finished the race in 22nd place.

=== IndyCar results ===
(key)

Year	Chassis	Engine	Drivers	No.	1	2	3	4	5	6	7	8	9	10	11	12	13	14	15	16	17	Pos.	Pts.
MotoGator Team Stange Racing with Arrow Schmidt Peterson Motorsports
2019					STP	COA	ALA	LBH	IMS	INDY	DET	DET	TEX	ROA	TOR	IOW	MOH	POC	GAT	POR	LAG		
2019	Dallara DW12	Honda HI19TT V6t	(Spain) Oriol Servià	77						22												34th	16
