= Christian Celaya =

Mexican racing driver

- Born: February 9, 1994 (age 32); Caborca, Sonora, Mexico

ARCA Menards Series career
- 1 race run over 1 year
- Best finish: 105th (2014)
- First race: 2014 Herr's Live Life With Flavor 200 (Madison)
Wins	Top tens	Poles
0	0	0

ARCA Menards Series East career
- 21 races run over 2 years
- Best finish: 18th (2015)
- First race: 2015 Hart to Heart Breast Cancer Foundation 150 (New Smyrna)
- Last race: 2016 Dover 125 (Dover)
Wins	Top tens	Poles
0	1	0

ARCA Menards Series West career
- 2 races run over 2 years
- Best finish: 44th (2016)
- First race: 2015 NAPA Auto Parts Wildcat 150 (Tucson)
- Last race: 2016 NAPA Auto Parts Wildcat 150 (Tucson)
Wins	Top tens	Poles
0	0	0
- Statistics up to date as of November 21, 2024.

Christian Celaya (born February 9, 1994) is a Mexican former professional stock car racing driver who has competed in the NASCAR K&N Pro Series East, the NASCAR K&N Pro Series West and the ARCA Racing Series.

Celaya has also previously competed in the World Series of Asphalt Stock Car Racing.

== Motorsports results ==
=== NASCAR ===
(key) (Bold - Pole position awarded by qualifying time. Italics - Pole position earned by points standings or practice time. * – Most laps led.)

==== K&N Pro Series East ====
NASCAR K&N Pro Series East results
Year	Team	No.	Make	1	2	3	4	5	6	7	8	9	10	11	12	13	14	NKNPSEC	Pts	Ref
2015	Team Stange Racing	45	Chevy	NSM; 19	GRE; 21	BRI	IOW; 16	BGS; 21	LGY; 22	COL; 22								18th	280	
2015	Rodrigo San Martin	09	Toyota								NHA; 23							18th	280	
2015	Rodrigo San Martin	09	Chevy									IOW; 19	GLN	MOT; 18	VIR; 11	RCH; 27	DOV; 29	18th	280	
2016	Rodrigo San Martin	09	Ford	NSM; 26	MOB; 17	GRE; 21	BRI; 20	VIR	DOM; 16	STA; 8	COL	NHA; 22	IOW; 13	GLN	GRE	NJM	DOV; 27	19th	226	

==== K&N Pro Series West ====
NASCAR K&N Pro Series West results
Year	Team	No.	Make	1	2	3	4	5	6	7	8	9	10	11	12	13	14	NKNPSWC	Pts	Ref
2015	Team Stange Racing	22	Chevy	KCR	IRW	TUS; 19	IOW	SHA	SON	SLS	IOW	EVG	CNS	MER	AAS			47th	37	
2015	Rodrigo San Martin	09	Chevy													PHO; DNQ		47th	37	
2016	Rodrigo San Martin	09	Ford	IRW	KCR	TUS; 12	OSS	CNS	SON	SLS	IOW	EVG	DCS	MMP	MMP	MER	AAS	44th	32	

=== ARCA Racing Series ===
(key) (Bold – Pole position awarded by qualifying time. Italics – Pole position earned by points standings or practice time. * – Most laps led.)

ARCA Racing Series results
Year	Team	No.	Make	1	2	3	4	5	6	7	8	9	10	11	12	13	14	15	16	17	18	19	20	ARSC	Pts	Ref
2014	Team Stange Racing	47	Ford	DAY	MOB	SLM	TAL	TOL	NJE	POC	MCH	ELK	WIN	CHI	IRP	POC	BLN	ISF	MAD; 16	DSF	SLM	KEN	KAN	N/A	0	
