= Maryeve Dufault =

French Canadian racing driver

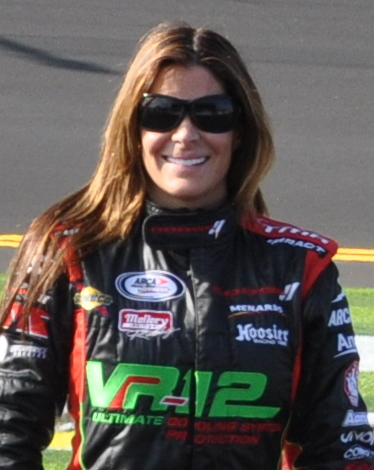
- Dufault in 2011
- Born: February 16, 1982 (age 44) Sorel-Tracy, Quebec, Canada

ARCA Racing Series career
- Debut season: 2011
- Former teams: Tony Marks Racing, Carter 2 Motorsports, Team Stange Racing
- Starts: 20
- Wins: 0
- Poles: 0
- Best finish: 16th in 2011
- Finished last season: 43rd (2014)

NASCAR O'Reilly Auto Parts Series career
- 2 races run over 2 years
- 2013 position: 81st
- Best finish: 77th (2011)
- First race: 2011 NAPA Auto Parts 200 (Montreal)
- Last race: 2013 Dollar General 300 (Joliet)
Wins	Top tens	Poles
0	0	0

NASCAR Canada Series career
- 2 races run over 1 year
- Best finish: 44th (2010)
- First race: 2010 GP3R 100 (Trois-Rivières)
- Last race: 2010 NAPA Autopro 100 (Montreal)
Wins	Top tens	Poles
0	0	0
- Statistics up to date as of June 4, 2020.

Maryeve Dufault (born February 16, 1982) is a Canadian professional racing driver, model, and advertising spokeswoman. She has raced in the Skip Barber, Formula BMW, Formula Renault, Star Mazda, NASCAR Canadian Tire Series, ARCA Racing Series and NASCAR Nationwide Series. As a model, she has appeared on numerous television series, most notably The Price is Right.

== Racing career ==
Dufault's father and brother raced motorcycles in Quebec. She began riding as a four-year-old, then racing motocross and turned to go-karts as an eight-year-old. By the time that she was nine years old she had broken both arms while racing. She began racing karts nationally in Canada and the United States in several series, including the Rotax International Series, winning several karting championships. She later moved up to formula racing, including Formula BMW USA, the Skip Barber Racing Series, Formula Russell, Formula Renault, Pro Star Mazda, and Formula 3, scoring podium finishes on several occasions, and captured victories in several series. Dufault has also performed precision driving for Honda, Polaris and Yamaha, and has also extensively tested Formula cars in China and Great Britain.

Dufault began Stock Car racing in the NASCAR Canadian Tire Series in 2010 by racing in two events. She signed as a driver development contract with the FAZZT Race Team in 2010, and was the first female race car driver selected to be part of the Dodge Motorsport driver development program.

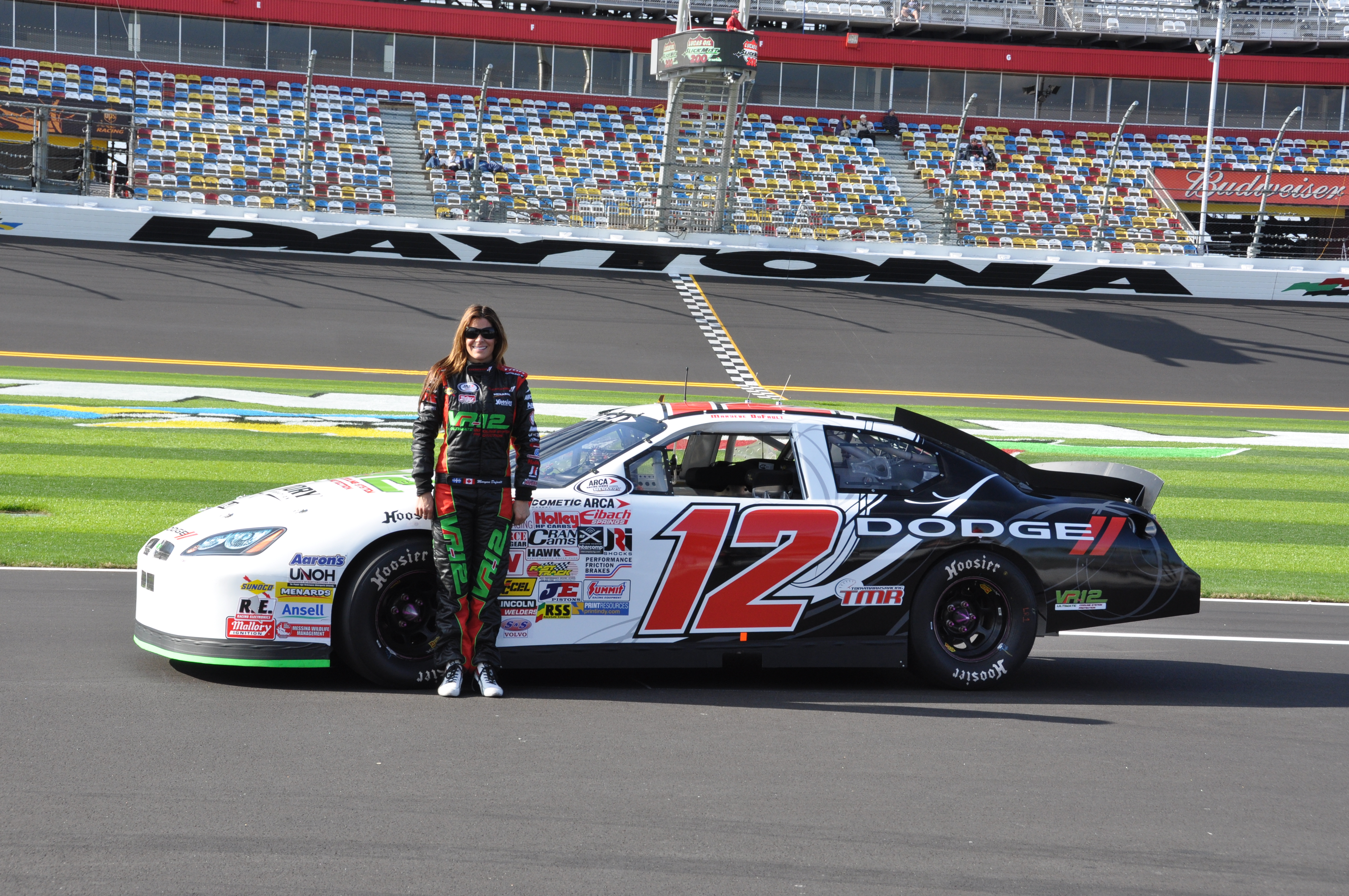
Dufault standing beside her No. 12 car at the ARCA season-opener at Daytona in 2011

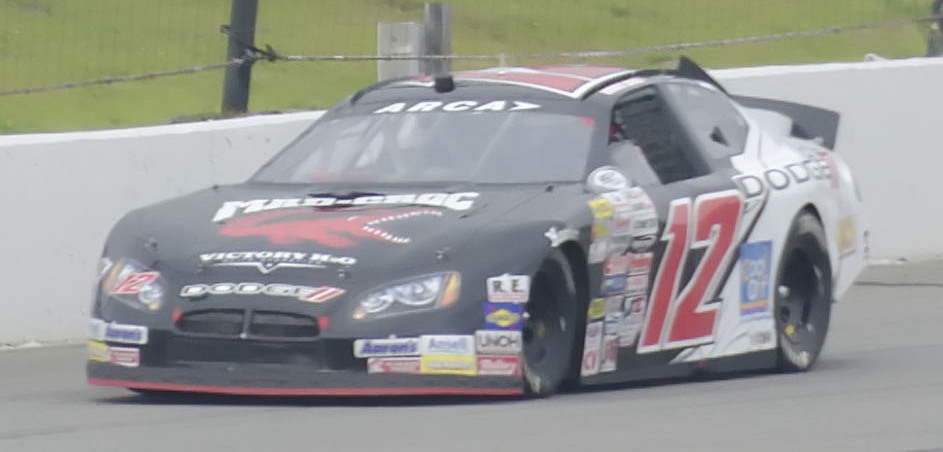
Dufault's No. 12 at Pocono in 2011

In early testing of her ARCA Racing Series car at New Smyrna Speedway and Daytona International Speedway in January 2011, Dufault impressed NASCAR driver Brad Keselowski. She made her ARCA debut at Daytona in February 2011; by December, she had made fourteen starts in the ARCA Racing Series with one top-ten and six top-13s in her first year in stock car racing; her first top 10 being a tenth-place finish at Chicagoland Speedway. She finished the ARCA season sixteenth in the series points standings, despite missing five races during the season because of a lack of sponsorship.

Dufault made her NASCAR Nationwide Series debut at Circuit Gilles Villeneuve on August 20, 2011 driving for MacDonald Motorsports. As the team was in the top 30 in season car-owner points, she was guaranteed a starting position; she started 39th and finished 30th with a transmission mount broke. She was the first Canadian woman to race in the NASCAR Nationwide Series since it took that name. Dufault was listed as one of the "Top female drivers in racing today" by Fox Sports, and was also named as one of the "Top 12 Up-and-Coming Female Drivers in Motorsports" by Bleacher Report. In addition, Dufault competed in the inaugural Dodge Viper Celebrity Challenge at Miller Motorsports Park in October 2011, competing alongside racing legends such as Roger Penske, Kurt Busch and Allen Johnson.

Dufault was featured on a Press Pass trading card in 2012. A lack of sponsorship delayed the start of her 2012 season.

In 2012, Dufault participated in the 'Drive for the Fans' social media contest, representing Fiat Abarth.

After competing in three ARCA Racing Series events for Carter 2 Motorsports in 2012, Dufault joined Go Green Racing for the 2013 season, impressing the team during testing and being assigned to drive in a Nationwide Series race for the team at Chicagoland Speedway.

In November 2013, it was announced that Dufault would drive full-time in ARCA for the 2014 season in the No. 46 for Team Stange Racing, as well as to return to Go Green Racing for an expanded twelve race schedule in the Nationwide Series in the No. 79 car. However, her Nationwide deal fell through because of Go Green's merger with Cup Series team FAS Lane Racing later in the offseason, and it was decided that the team would only compete in Cup with FAS Lane's No. 32 team and to close down their Nationwide No. 79 team. Due to lack of sponsorship, Dufault and TSR only ran three races at the start of the season, and her and the team did not complete the season. The No. 46 had skipped the race at Salem, which indicated the team was having financial problems.

== Media career ==
Dufault won Miss Hawaiian Tropic International in 2000, beating over 35,000 competitors for the honor, becoming the only Miss Hawaiian Tropic International ever from Quebec and only the third Canadian winner. She, along with co-winner Lisa Kessous, also from Quebec, won the Miss Hawaiian Tropic Canada competition and both represented Canada at the world competition in Las Vegas in 2000. She narrowly beat the more curvaceous and exotic Kessous for the world title in Las Vegas. Her main participation reason was winning prizes including a motorcycle and Jet Ski, as well as prize money to keep racing. She was invited to the United Service Organizations "USO" tour, Operation in Kosovo, Bosnia and Macedonia. She has appeared on a number of television shows and movies like Driven, Entourage, Relative Strangers, The Bold and the Beautiful, Jay Leno's opening show and including the American game show "The Price Is Right" during the Bob Barker era. She modeled in the August 2011 issue of Maxim. She also acted as a stunt driver for the movie Fast Girl. Dufault was invited to participate on the show The Insider, as well as on E! News to talk about women in racing and the difficulties of competing in a male dominated sport. She has also been featured by Sports Illustrated as their "Lovely Lady of the Day".

Dufault said that she models to earn money to be a race car driver. "I wasn’t buying myself clothes. I was buying tires," Dufault said to the New York Post. "I am a racer who uses modeling jobs to pay my bills." Dufault said she still gets the questions and the puzzled looks as some folks struggle to understand her preference for the noise and smoke at the race track over the glitz and glamour of the modeling world.

"Sure, some people think it is crazy, but I know where my heart is. I'm a race car driver, and I want to be known first for what I accomplish on the track. We all took different routes to get here, but every driver wants the same thing. You want to compete, and you want to win. My passion is here at the track."

— Maryeve Dufault, Toledo Blade interview, May 12, 2011.

=== Charity work ===
In 2010, Dufault raised US$10,000 to the National Breast Cancer Foundation, as well as participating in a Bermudan trip to raise funds for the Syncairly Yours Foundation, a charity for uninsured mothers with premature babies.

== Personal life ==
In the early 2000s Dufault moved from her native Quebec to Los Angeles to pursue her racing career. She currently resides in Mooresville, North Carolina.

== Motorsports career results ==
=== NASCAR ===
(key) (Bold – Pole position awarded by qualifying time. Italics – Pole position earned by points standings or practice time. * – Most laps led.)

==== Nationwide Series ====
NASCAR Nationwide Series results
Year	Team	No.	Make	1	2	3	4	5	6	7	8	9	10	11	12	13	14	15	16	17	18	19	20	21	22	23	24	25	26	27	28	29	30	31	32	33	34	NNSC	Pts	Ref
2011	MacDonald Motorsports	81	Dodge	DAY	PHO	LVS	BRI	CAL	TEX	TAL	NSH	RCH	DAR	DOV	IOW	CLT	CHI	MCH	ROA	DAY	KEN	NHA	NSH	IRP	IOW	GLN	CGV; 30	BRI	ATL	RCH	CHI	DOV	KAN	CLT	TEX	PHO	HOM	77th	14	
2013	Go Green Racing	79	Ford	DAY	PHO	LVS	BRI	CAL	TEX	RCH	TAL	DAR	CLT	DOV	IOW	MCH	ROA	KEN	DAY	NHA	CHI	IND	IOW	GLN	MOH	BRI	ATL	RCH	CHI; 31	KEN	DOV	KAN	CLT	TEX	PHO	HOM		81st	13	

==== Canadian Tire Series ====
NASCAR Canadian Tire Series results
Year	Team	No.	Make	1	2	3	4	5	6	7	8	9	10	11	12	13	NCTSC	Pts	Ref
2010	Derek White	10	Dodge	DEL	MSP	ASE	TOR	EDM	MPS	SAS	CTR; 19	MSP	CGV; 26	BAR	RIS	KWA	44th	191	

=== ARCA Racing Series ===
(key) (Bold – Pole position awarded by qualifying time. Italics – Pole position earned by points standings or practice time. * – Most laps led.)

ARCA Racing Series results
Year	Team	No.	Make	1	2	3	4	5	6	7	8	9	10	11	12	13	14	15	16	17	18	19	20	ARSC	Pts	Ref
2011	Tony Marks Racing	12	Dodge	DAY; 28	TAL; 12	SLM; 13	TOL; 23	NJE; 21	CHI; 10	POC; 12	MCH; 28	WIN; 20	BLN	IOW; 25	IRP; 24	POC; 13	ISF	MAD	DSF	SLM	KAN; 18	TOL; 26		16th	2105	
2012	Carter 2 Motorsports	40	Dodge	DAY	MOB	SLM	TAL	TOL	ELK	POC	MCH	WIN	NJE	IOW	CHI	IRP	POC; 26	BLN	ISF	MAD				62nd	350	
2012	Carter 2 Motorsports	14	Dodge																		SLM; 23	DSF	KAN; 19	62nd	350	
2014	Team Stange Racing	46	Ford	DAY; 18	MOB; 17	SLM	TAL; 25	TOL	NJE	POC	MCH	ELK	WIN	CHI	IRP	POC	BLN	ISF	MAD	DSF	SLM	KEN	KAN	43rd	395	
