= 2026 Cuervo 300 =

NASCAR O'Reilly Auto Parts Series race at Chicagoland Speedway

Race details
- Race 20 of 33 in the 2026 NASCAR O'Reilly Auto Parts Series
- Date: July 4, 2026
- Location: Chicagoland Speedway in Joliet, Illinois
- Course: Permanent racing facility
- Course length: 1.5 miles ({{{Course_km}}} km)
- Distance: 201 laps, 301.5 mi (485.217 km)
- Scheduled distance: 200 laps, 300 mi (482.803 km)
- Average speed: 118.119 miles per hour (190.094 km/h)

Pole position
Driver	Connor Zilisch	JR Motorsports
- Grid positions set by competition-based formula

Most laps led
Driver	Chase Elliott	JR Motorsports
- Laps: 78

Fastest lap
Driver	Connor Zilisch	JR Motorsports
- Time: 31.073

Winner
No. 20	Brandon Jones	Joe Gibbs Racing

Television in the United States
- Network: The CW
- Announcers: Adam Alexander, Jamie McMurray, and Parker Kligerman

Radio in the United States
- Radio: MRN
- Booth announcers: Alex Hayden, Mike Bagley, and Todd Gordon
- Turn announcers: Kurt Becker (1 & 2) and Tim Catalfamo (3 & 4)

The 2026 Cuervo 300 was a NASCAR O'Reilly Auto Parts Series race held on Saturday, July 4, 2026, at Chicagoland Speedway in Joliet, Illinois. Contested over 201 laps—extended from 200 laps due to an overtime finish on the 1.5-mile (2.4 km) asphalt oval, it was the 20th race of the 2026 NASCAR O'Reilly Auto Parts Series season, and the 20th running of the event and the first since 2019.

In a dramatic finish, Brandon Jones, driving for Joe Gibbs Racing, took the lead from Chase Elliott in the final overtime restart, holding him off in a close battle to earn his eighth career NASCAR O'Reilly Auto Parts Series win, and his first of the season. Connor Zilisch won the first stage and led 48 laps, while Elliott won the second stage and led the race-high 78 laps. Elliott finished second, and Jesse Love finished third. Brent Crews and Austin Hill rounded out the top five, while Justin Allgaier, Taylor Gray, Sam Mayer, Cole Custer, and Zilisch rounded out the top ten.

== Report ==
=== Background ===
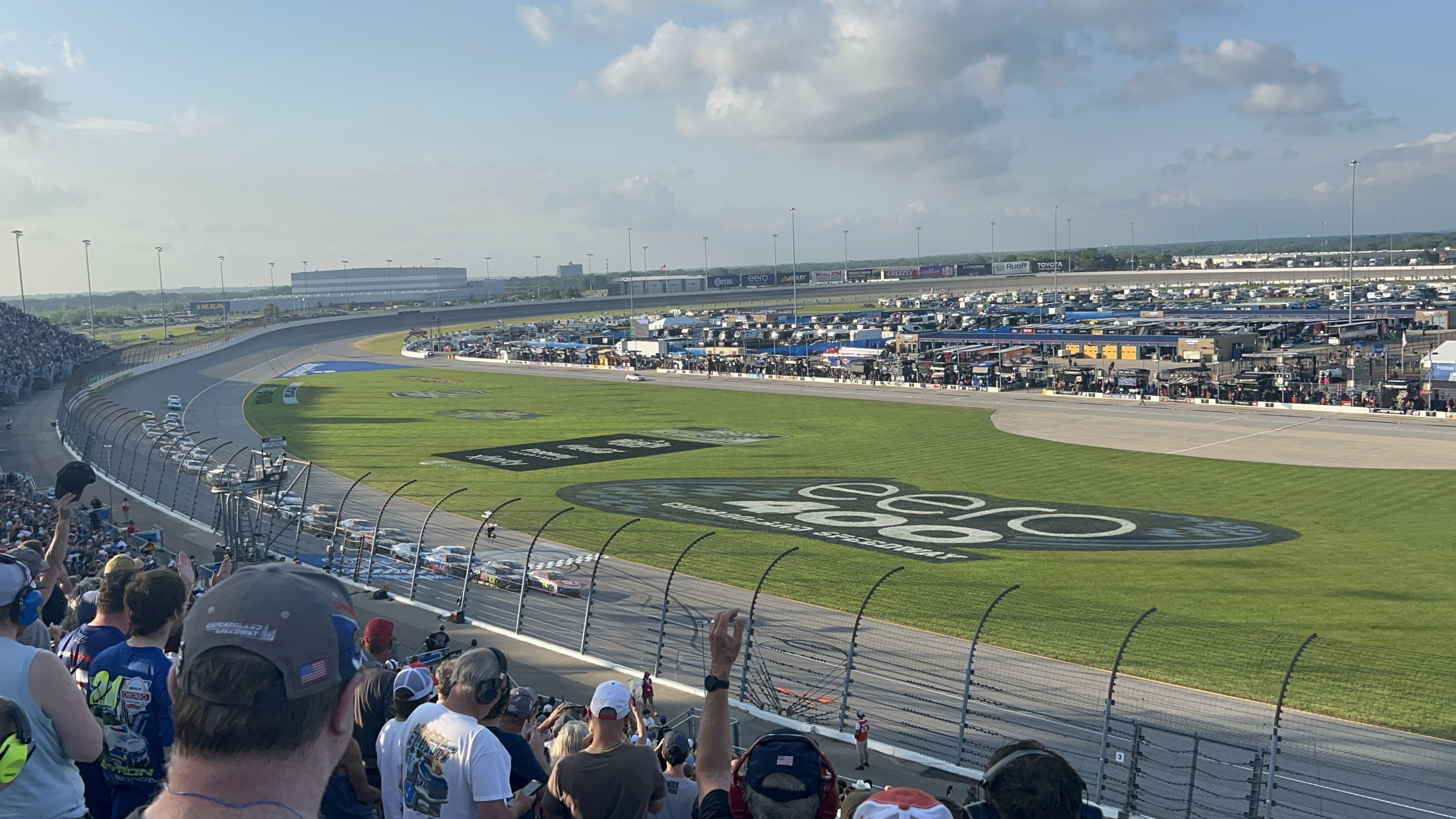
Chicagoland Speedway, the track where the race was held.

Chicagoland Speedway is a 1.5 miles (2.4 km) tri-oval speedway in Joliet, Illinois, southwest of Chicago. The speedway opened in 2001 and currently hosts NASCAR races. Until 2011, the speedway also hosted the IndyCar Series, recording numerous close finishes, including the closest finish in IndyCar history. The speedway is owned and operated by International Speedway Corporation and is located adjacent to Route 66 Raceway.

This race marked the O'Reilly Auto Parts Series' return to Chicagoland Speedway for the first time since 2019.

On July 1, Cuervo Tequila was announced as the title sponsor for the race.

==== Entry list ====
- (R) denotes rookie driver.
- (i) denotes driver who is ineligible for series driver points.

#	Driver	Team	Make
00	Sheldon Creed	Haas Factory Team	Chevrolet
0	Cole Custer (i)	SS-Green Light Racing	Chevrolet
1	Connor Zilisch (i)	JR Motorsports	Chevrolet
02	Ryan Ellis	Young's Motorsports	Chevrolet
2	Jesse Love	Richard Childress Racing	Chevrolet
07	Josh Bilicki	SS-Green Light Racing	Chevrolet
7	Justin Allgaier	JR Motorsports	Chevrolet
8	Sammy Smith	JR Motorsports	Chevrolet
9	Carson Kvapil	JR Motorsports	Chevrolet
17	Corey Day	Hendrick Motorsports	Chevrolet
18	William Sawalich	Joe Gibbs Racing	Toyota
19	Brent Crews (R)	Joe Gibbs Racing	Toyota
20	Brandon Jones	Joe Gibbs Racing	Toyota
21	Austin Hill	Richard Childress Racing	Chevrolet
24	Harrison Burton	Sam Hunt Racing	Toyota
26	Dean Thompson	Sam Hunt Racing	Toyota
27	Jeb Burton	Jordan Anderson Racing	Chevrolet
28	Kyle Sieg	RSS Racing	Chevrolet
31	Blaine Perkins	Jordan Anderson Racing	Chevrolet
32	Rajah Caruth	Jordan Anderson Racing	Chevrolet
38	J. J. Yeley	RSS Racing	Ford
39	Ryan Sieg	RSS Racing	Chevrolet
41	Sam Mayer	Haas Factory Team	Chevrolet
42	Garrett Smithley	Young's Motorsports	Chevrolet
44	Brennan Poole	Alpha Prime Racing	Chevrolet
45	Lavar Scott (R)	Alpha Prime Racing	Chevrolet
47	Dawson Cram	Team Stange Racing	Chevrolet
48	Patrick Staropoli (R)	Big Machine Racing	Chevrolet
51	Jeremy Clements	Jeremy Clements Racing	Chevrolet
53	Tyler Tomassi	Joey Gase Motorsports	Chevrolet
54	Taylor Gray	Joe Gibbs Racing	Toyota
55	Joey Gase	Joey Gase Motorsports	Chevrolet
87	Nick Sanchez	Peterson Racing	Chevrolet
88	Chase Elliott (i)	JR Motorsports	Chevrolet
91	Myatt Snider	DGM Racing	Chevrolet
92	Leland Honeyman (i)	DGM Racing	Chevrolet
96	Anthony Alfredo	Viking Motorsports	Chevrolet
99	Parker Retzlaff	Viking Motorsports	Chevrolet
Official entry list

== Practice ==
The first and only practice session was held on Saturday, July 4, at 12:30 PM CST, and lasted for 50 minutes. It was originally scheduled to be held on Friday, July 3, at 3:30 PM CST, but was postponed due to inclement weather, and took over the time slot of qualifying.

Jesse Love, driving for Richard Childress Racing, set the fastest time in the session, with a lap of 31.118 seconds, and a speed of 173.533 miles per hour (279.274 km/h).

Pos.	#	Driver	Team	Make	Time	Speed
1	2	Jesse Love	Richard Childress Racing	Chevrolet	31.118	173.533
2	27	Jeb Burton	Jordan Anderson Racing	Chevrolet	31.406	171.942
3	7	Justin Allgaier	JR Motorsports	Chevrolet	31.424	171.843
Full practice results

== Starting lineup ==
Qualifying was originally scheduled to be held on Saturday, July 4, at 12:30 PM CST, but was cancelled due to practice taking over the time slot from inclement weather the previous day. Connor Zilisch, driving for JR Motorsports, was awarded the pole position as a result of NASCAR's pandemic formula with a score of 2.000.

=== Starting lineup ===
Pos.	#	Driver	Team	Make
1	1	Connor Zilisch (i)	JR Motorsports	Chevrolet
2	19	Brent Crews (R)	Joe Gibbs Racing	Toyota
3	9	Carson Kvapil	JR Motorsports	Chevrolet
4	17	Corey Day	Hendrick Motorsports	Chevrolet
5	99	Parker Retzlaff	Viking Motorsports	Chevrolet
6	2	Jesse Love	Richard Childress Racing	Chevrolet
7	96	Anthony Alfredo	Viking Motorsports	Chevrolet
8	00	Sheldon Creed	Haas Factory Team	Chevrolet
9	41	Sam Mayer	Haas Factory Team	Chevrolet
10	8	Sammy Smith	JR Motorsports	Chevrolet
11	88	Chase Elliott (i)	JR Motorsports	Chevrolet
12	91	Myatt Snider	DGM Racing	Chevrolet
13	18	William Sawalich	Joe Gibbs Racing	Toyota
14	39	Ryan Sieg	RSS Racing	Chevrolet
15	87	Nick Sanchez	Peterson Racing	Chevrolet
16	21	Austin Hill	Richard Childress Racing	Chevrolet
17	7	Justin Allgaier	JR Motorsports	Chevrolet
18	24	Harrison Burton	Sam Hunt Racing	Toyota
19	07	Josh Bilicki	SS-Green Light Racing	Chevrolet
20	51	Jeremy Clements	Jeremy Clements Racing	Chevrolet
21	0	Cole Custer (i)	SS-Green Light Racing	Chevrolet
22	27	Jeb Burton	Jordan Anderson Racing	Chevrolet
23	42	Garrett Smithley	Young's Motorsports	Chevrolet
24	44	Brennan Poole	Alpha Prime Racing	Chevrolet
25	54	Taylor Gray	Joe Gibbs Racing	Toyota
26	26	Dean Thompson	Sam Hunt Racing	Toyota
27	48	Patrick Staropoli (R)	Big Machine Racing	Chevrolet
28	02	Ryan Ellis	Young's Motorsports	Chevrolet
29	20	Brandon Jones	Joe Gibbs Racing	Toyota
30	31	Blaine Perkins	Jordan Anderson Racing	Chevrolet
31	92	Leland Honeyman (i)	DGM Racing	Chevrolet
32	32	Rajah Caruth	Jordan Anderson Racing	Chevrolet
Qualified by owner's points
33	28	Kyle Sieg	RSS Racing	Chevrolet
34	45	Lavar Scott (R)	Alpha Prime Racing	Chevrolet
35	53	Tyler Tomassi	Joey Gase Motorsports	Chevrolet
36	47	Dawson Cram	Team Stange Racing	Chevrolet
37	55	Joey Gase	Joey Gase Motorsports	Chevrolet
38	38	J. J. Yeley	RSS Racing	Ford
Official starting lineup

== Race ==
=== Race results ===
==== Stage Results ====
Stage One Laps: 45

Pos.	#	Driver	Team	Make	Pts
1	1	Connor Zilisch (i)	JR Motorsports	Chevrolet	0
2	2	Jesse Love	Richard Childress Racing	Chevrolet	9
3	17	Corey Day	Hendrick Motorsports	Chevrolet	8
4	88	Chase Elliott (i)	JR Motorsports	Chevrolet	0
5	00	Sheldon Creed	Haas Factory Team	Chevrolet	6
6	54	Taylor Gray	Joe Gibbs Racing	Toyota	5
7	41	Sam Mayer	Haas Factory Team	Chevrolet	4
8	18	William Sawalich	Joe Gibbs Racing	Toyota	3
9	7	Justin Allgaier	JR Motorsports	Chevrolet	2
10	96	Anthony Alfredo	Viking Motorsports	Chevrolet	1

Stage Two Laps: 45

Pos.	#	Driver	Team	Make	Pts
1	88	Chase Elliott (i)	JR Motorsports	Chevrolet	0
2	2	Jesse Love	Richard Childress Racing	Chevrolet	9
3	54	Taylor Gray	Joe Gibbs Racing	Toyota	8
4	7	Justin Allgaier	JR Motorsports	Chevrolet	7
5	41	Sam Mayer	Haas Factory Team	Chevrolet	6
6	20	Brandon Jones	Joe Gibbs Racing	Toyota	5
7	00	Sheldon Creed	Haas Factory Team	Chevrolet	4
8	17	Corey Day	Hendrick Motorsports	Chevrolet	3
9	1	Connor Zilisch (i)	JR Motorsports	Chevrolet	0
10	19	Brent Crews (R)	Joe Gibbs Racing	Toyota	1

=== Final Stage Results ===
Stage Three Laps: 111

Fin	St	#	Driver	Team	Make	Laps	Led	Status	Pts
1	29	20	Brandon Jones	Joe Gibbs Racing	Toyota	201	12	Running	60
2	11	88	Chase Elliott (i)	JR Motorsports	Chevrolet	201	78	Running	0
3	6	2	Jesse Love	Richard Childress Racing	Chevrolet	201	5	Running	52
4	2	19	Brent Crews (R)	Joe Gibbs Racing	Toyota	201	0	Running	34
5	16	21	Austin Hill	Richard Childress Racing	Chevrolet	201	0	Running	32
6	17	7	Justin Allgaier	JR Motorsports	Chevrolet	201	0	Running	40
7	25	54	Taylor Gray	Joe Gibbs Racing	Toyota	201	55	Running	43
8	9	41	Sam Mayer	Haas Factory Team	Chevrolet	201	0	Running	39
9	21	0	Cole Custer (i)	SS-Green Light Racing	Chevrolet	201	0	Running	0
10	1	1	Connor Zilisch (i)	JR Motorsports	Chevrolet	201	48	Running	0
11	3	9	Carson Kvapil	JR Motorsports	Chevrolet	201	0	Running	26
12	15	87	Nick Sanchez	Peterson Racing	Chevrolet	201	0	Running	25
13	10	8	Sammy Smith	JR Motorsports	Chevrolet	201	0	Running	24
14	5	99	Parker Retzlaff	Viking Motorsports	Chevrolet	201	0	Running	23
15	18	24	Harrison Burton	Sam Hunt Racing	Toyota	201	0	Running	22
16	8	00	Sheldon Creed	Haas Factory Team	Chevrolet	201	0	Running	31
17	26	26	Dean Thompson	Sam Hunt Racing	Toyota	201	0	Running	20
18	23	42	Garrett Smithley	Young's Motorsports	Chevrolet	201	0	Running	19
19	4	17	Corey Day	Hendrick Motorsports	Chevrolet	201	0	Running	29
20	22	27	Jeb Burton	Jordan Anderson Racing	Chevrolet	201	0	Running	17
21	31	92	Leland Honeyman (i)	DGM Racing	Chevrolet	201	0	Running	0
22	28	02	Ryan Ellis	Young's Motorsports	Chevrolet	201	0	Running	15
23	12	91	Myatt Snider	DGM Racing	Chevrolet	201	0	Running	14
24	32	32	Rajah Caruth	Jordan Anderson Racing	Chevrolet	201	0	Running	13
25	24	44	Brennan Poole	Alpha Prime Racing	Chevrolet	201	0	Running	12
26	7	96	Anthony Alfredo	Viking Motorsports	Chevrolet	201	0	Running	12
27	27	48	Patrick Staropoli (R)	Big Machine Racing	Chevrolet	201	0	Running	10
28	34	45	Lavar Scott (R)	Alpha Prime Racing	Chevrolet	201	0	Running	9
29	13	18	William Sawalich	Joe Gibbs Racing	Toyota	201	0	Running	11
30	33	28	Kyle Sieg	RSS Racing	Chevrolet	201	0	Running	7
31	14	39	Ryan Sieg	RSS Racing	Chevrolet	200	3	Running	6
32	30	31	Blaine Perkins	Jordan Anderson Racing	Chevrolet	199	0	Running	5
33	35	53	Tyler Tomassi	Joey Gase Motorsports	Chevrolet	199	0	Running	4
34	37	55	Joey Gase	Joey Gase Motorsports	Chevrolet	198	0	Running	3
35	20	51	Jeremy Clements	Jeremy Clements Racing	Chevrolet	198	0	Running	2
36	19	07	Josh Bilicki	SS-Green Light Racing	Chevrolet	196	0	Running	1
37	38	38	J. J. Yeley	RSS Racing	Ford	55	0	Power	1
38	36	47	Dawson Cram	Team Stange Racing	Chevrolet	35	0	Engine	1
Official race results

=== Race statistics ===
- Lead changes: 16 among 6 different drivers
- Cautions/Laps: 7 for 40 laps
- Red flags: 0
- Time of race: 2 hours, 33 minutes and 9 seconds
- Average speed: 118.119 miles per hour (190.094 km/h)

== Standings after the race ==
Drivers' Championship standings

	Pos	Driver	Points
	1	Justin Allgaier	898
	2	Jesse Love	703 (–195)
	3	Corey Day	674 (–224)
	4	Sheldon Creed	673 (–225)
	5	Austin Hill	643 (–255)
2	6	Brandon Jones	633 (–265)
1	7	Carson Kvapil	630 (–268)
1	8	Sammy Smith	602 (–296)
	9	Parker Retzlaff	556 (–342)
	10	Sam Mayer	549 (–349)
1	11	Taylor Gray	535 (–363)
1	12	Brent Crews	527 (–371)
Official driver's standings

Manufacturers' Championship standings

Pos	Manufacturer	Points
1	Chevrolet	1,039
2	Toyota	698 (–341)
3	Ford	190 (–849)

- Note: Only the first 12 positions are included for the driver standings.

Previous race: 2026 Pit Boss/FoodMaxx 250	NASCAR O'Reilly Auto Parts Series; 2026 season	Next race: 2026 Focused Health 250 (Atlanta)
