= List of female NASCAR drivers =

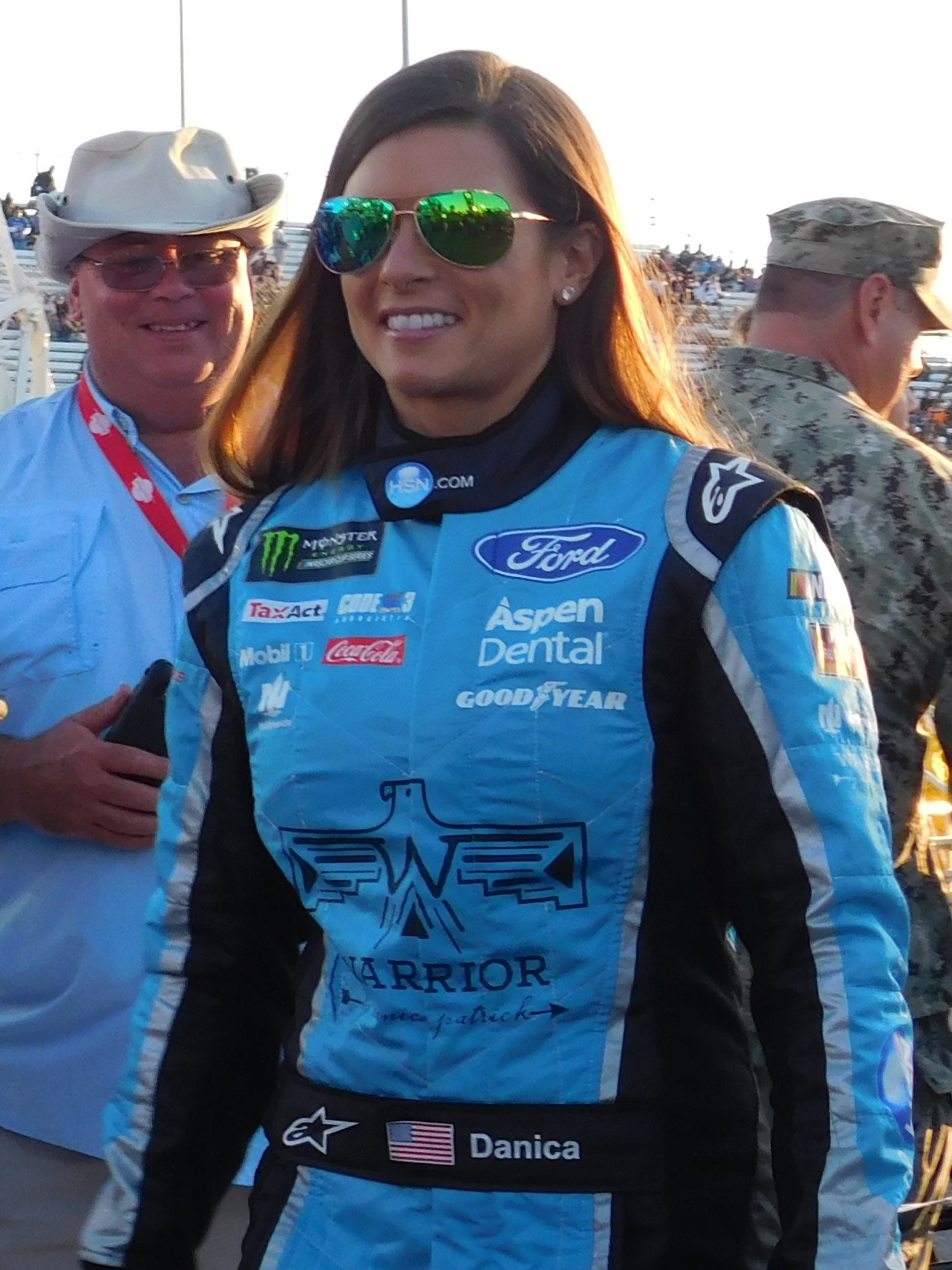
Danica Patrick, arguably NASCAR's most prominent female driver, competed full-time in the NASCAR Cup Series for five years (as well as part-time in two others). She made her final start in the 2018 Daytona 500.

The following is a list of female NASCAR drivers who have participated in a national or regional touring series race since the organization's inception in 1949, along with statistical totals for their NASCAR careers.

At least 135 women have qualified for and started a race in one of NASCAR's national or regional touring series, including 16 in the NASCAR Cup Series since the organization's inception in 1949. As of September 2026, Shawna Robinson, Hailie Deegan, Manami Kobayashi, Gracie Trotter, and Tatiana Calderón remain the only women to have won a race in one of NASCAR's touring series. Robinson won three times between 1988 and 1989 in the now-defunct Dash Series, Deegan won three races in the K&N Pro Series West between 2018 and 2019. In 2019, Kobayashi won in her one and only start in the NASCAR Euro Series (in the Elite Club Division). Trotter won a race in the renamed ARCA Menards Series West in 2020, becoming the second female winner in the West Series, as well as the first winner in the series under the ARCA banner. She also became the first winner in any ARCA-sanctioned series, because there have been no female winners in the main ARCA Menards Series as of March 2026. Calderón (a native Colombian) won her first ever NASCAR Brasil Series race in the 2026 regular season finale in Curvelo, Mato Grosso, punching her ticket into the inaugural Brasil Series playoffs as the Challenge Division Regular Season Champion (akin to the now defunct NASCAR Cup Series playoff structure.)

Seven female drivers have won poles: Deegan, Kirk, Patrick, Robinson, Mara Reyes, Brittney Zamora, and Isabella Robusto. Relatively few women have contested a full season in any of NASCAR's touring series, although this is becoming more common. During the 2025 season, there were only two women running a full season: Toni Breidinger and Isabella Robusto.

While some female NASCAR drivers have transitioned or attempted to transition from open-wheel racing and sports car racing (such as Sarah Fisher, Janet Guthrie, Patrick, and Katherine Legge), most have climbed the stock-car racing ladder (such as Tammy Jo Kirk, Johanna Long, and Shawna Robinson), beginning to race full-sized stock cars in their teenage years. A handful of women (such as Fisher, Mackena Bell and Kenzie Ruston) have raced with the help of NASCAR's Drive for Diversity program since its creation in 2004.

Currently, Katherine Legge is the only woman in the NASCAR Cup Series, with her start at Phoenix Raceway in March 2025 being the first with a woman in the Series since Danica Patrick in the 2018 Daytona 500. On April 10, 2025, it was announced that Legge was bringing her e.l.f. sponsorship over from the Indianapolis 500, spreading it across the NASCAR Xfinity Series as the only woman racing in that series and the Cup Series for at least seven races in 2025. The first e.l.f. race was in Xfinity on April 19 at Rockingham Speedway and her next Cup race was at Autodromo Hermanos Rodriguez on June 15. Other races revealed include the Xfinity race at Charlotte Motor Speedway Memorial Day Weekend, ruling out a return to the 2025 Indy 500.

Toni Breidinger was the only woman competing in the NASCAR Craftsman Truck Series in 2025.

== History ==
=== 20th century ===
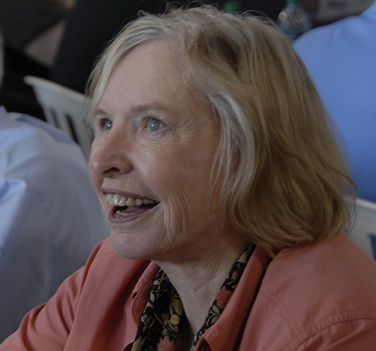
Janet Guthrie was the first woman to race on a superspeedway, in the 1976 World 600.

NASCAR has seen varying levels of participation by female drivers throughout its ranks since the sanctioning body's inception in 1949. Sara Christian competed in the inaugural NASCAR race at Charlotte Speedway (she had Bob Flock finish the race). In the second official race, at Daytona Beach and Road Course, Christian was joined by Ethel Mobley and Louise Smith, with Mobley finishing first out of the 3, in 11th. Through the 1950s and 1960s, female racers made only a handful of starts in NASCAR's touring series. Betty Skelton Erde wasn't technically a NASCAR driver, but she drove the pace car at Daytona in 1954, and was clocked at a speed of 105.88 mph (170.40 km/h) on the sand, setting a stock car speed record for women.

No woman had raced NASCAR in a decade when Janet Guthrie started the 1976 World 600, finishing 15th, ahead of Dale Earnhardt. In 1977, Guthrie became the first woman to lead a Winston Cup Series race under caution, at Ontario Speedway. In 1986, Patty Moise became the first woman to lead in a Busch Series race.

In 1988, Charlotte/Daytona Dash Series (later the Goody's Dash Series) driver Shawna Robinson became the first woman to win a NASCAR Touring Series event, also earning "Rookie of the Year" and "Most Popular Driver" honors. In her sophomore Dash Series run, Robinson became the first woman to earn the pole position for a NASCAR touring series race. Robinson later became the first female driver to clinch the pole in any of the three major series, winning qualifying for the March 12, 1994 Xfinity Series Busch Light 300 at Atlanta Motor Speedway.

In Australia, Terri Sawyer won the Moomba 100 NASCAR race at the Calder Park Thunderdome, Melbourne on March 3, 1991 driving a Pontiac. She had previously attempted the NASCAR Sportsman series in the US.

Women began to compete more frequently throughout NASCAR's lower series over the course of the 1990s. Patty Moise made a record 133 Xfinity Series starts between 1986 and 1998 and Tammy Jo Kirk scored 37 top-10 finishes and two poles in what was then known as the All Pro Series, before making the first starts for a woman in the Camping World Truck Series.

=== 2000s ===
After a hiatus to start a family, Shawna Robinson returned to stock car racing in 1999, contesting a full ARCA Bondo/Mar-Hyde Series season in 2000 before returning to sporadic NASCAR-sanctioned competition over the following several seasons. In 2001, she was the first woman to finish a race in the Winston Cup Series since Janet Guthrie in 1980. In 2003, Robinson had the first all-female pit crew for a Craftsman Truck Series race at Texas Motor Speedway.

In 2004, NASCAR started the Drive for Diversity program, hoping to develop a more diverse driver base. While the program has succeeded in launching the careers of minority drivers including NASCAR Cup Series drivers Kyle Larson, Bubba Wallace and Daniel Suárez, the program's early years were less effective in expanding the roster of female drivers in NASCAR's top touring series.

=== 2010s ===
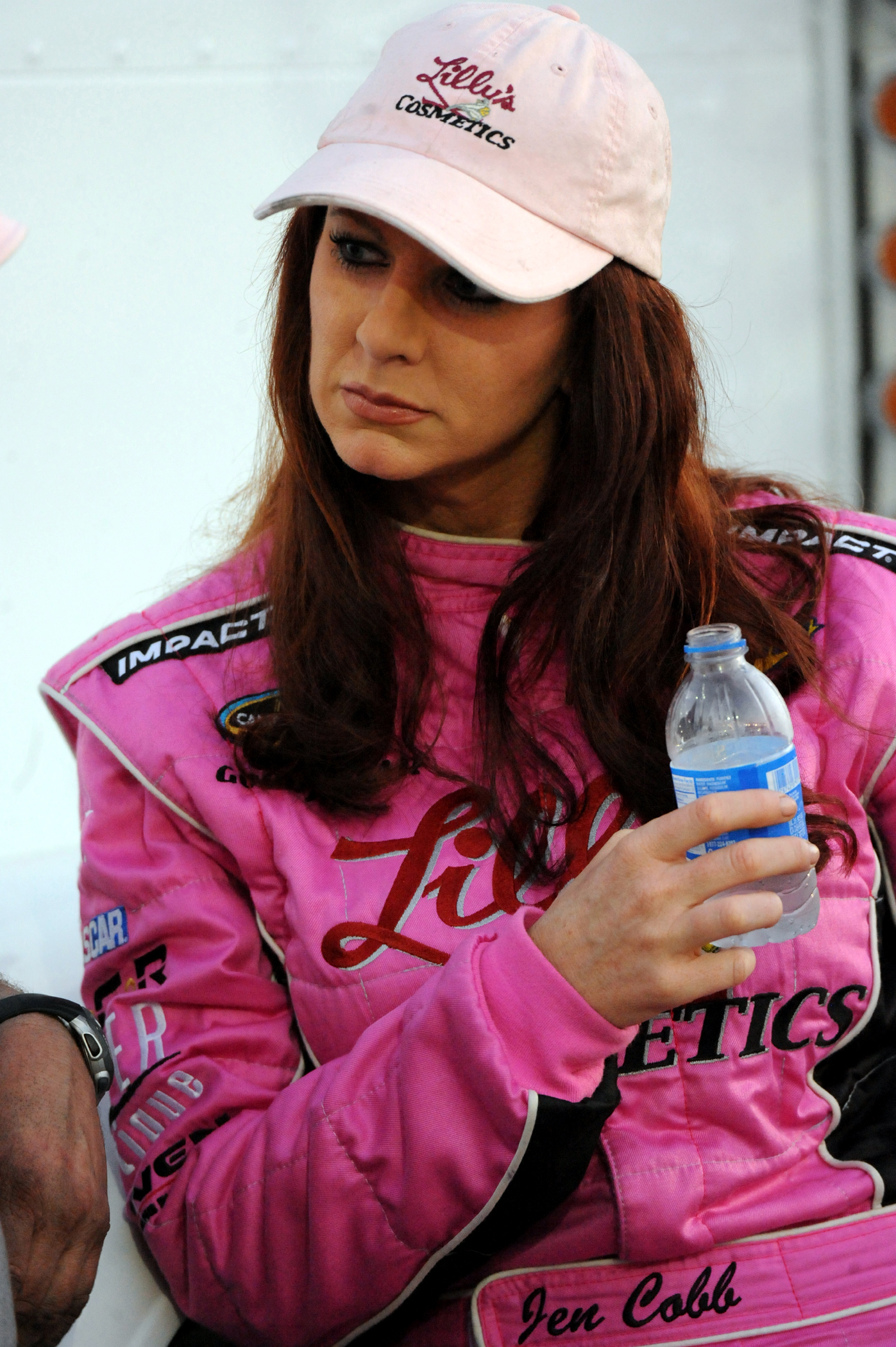
Jennifer Jo Cobb has competed full-time with her own team in the NASCAR Truck Series for over a decade.

In 2010, IndyCar Series driver Danica Patrick joined NASCAR, racing part-time in the K&N Pro Series East and the Nationwide Series. Patrick recorded a major milestone by clinching the pole position in the 2012 DRIVE4COPD 300, being the first female driver to clinch it since Shawna Robinson. However, Patrick finished 38th after a crash. In 2012, Patric raced part-time in the Sprint Cup Series.

In 2011, Snowball Derby winner Johanna Long entered the Camping World Truck Series at 19 years of age, being the youngest female driver to race in the series. Long eventually raced in the Nationwide Series, making her debut in the 2012 DRIVE4COPD 300.

In 2012, Danica Patrick was voted NASCAR's Most Popular Nationwide Driver, becoming the first woman to receive that award in NASCAR's top three divisions.

In 2013, Patrick became the first woman in Sprint Cup history to have a full-time ride in the series (with Stewart–Haas Racing), and eventually the first female driver to clinch the pole position and lead a green flag lap, both occurring at the 2013 Daytona 500, becoming the first woman to lead both the Indianapolis 500 and the Daytona 500. Patrick later finished the race in eighth place, the highest finish for a woman in the Daytona 500. She also became the first woman to race at every racetrack on the circuit. In 2014, Patrick became the first woman to race in the 2014 Sprint Unlimited. At Talladega she became the first woman to lead laps there. That year she had three top 10 finishes with her best finish of sixth at Atlanta. In 2015, Patrick tied Janet Guthrie for most top ten finishes for a woman with a seventh place finish at Martinsville. A few weeks later she passed Guthrie for the most top ten finishes for a woman in Sprint Cup history at Bristol. At Michigan she became the first woman to lead under green on a non-restrictor plate track. At Kentucky, Patrick became the first woman to make 100 starts in NASCAR's Cup Series. In 2016, Patrick led a career high 30 laps and completed more circuits than all but three other drivers. Patrick opened 2017 season with a fourth place finish in the Advance Auto Parts Clash (an exhibition race for previous pole winners). She retired from full-time stock car racing after the 2018 Daytona 500.

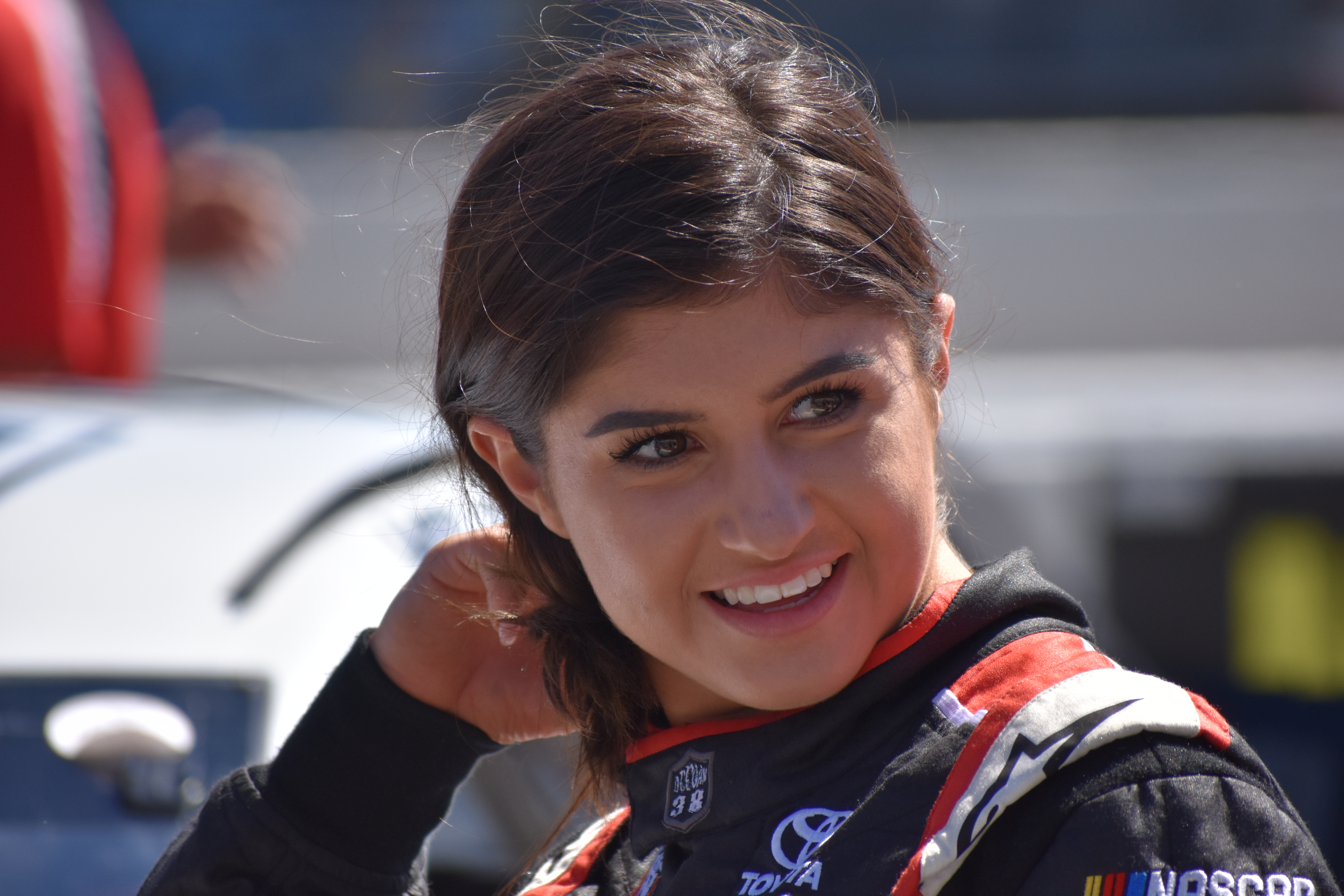
Hailie Deegan, the first female driver to win a race in what is now the ARCA Menards Series West

The NASCAR Whelen Euro Series formed the Lady Cup, a championship system for female drivers in 2014. In 2016, a record 18 different women started a race in one of NASCAR's touring series. Julia Landauer was the most successful within her respective series, finishing fourth in points in the K&N Pro Series West with seven top-five finishes in fourteen races.

In 2018, Hailie Deegan became the first female driver to win a NASCAR touring series race in roughly three decades, winning in the K&N Pro Series West in the series' race at Meridian Speedway. She followed this up by winning two more races in 2019, which came at the Las Vegas Motor Speedway Dirt Track and at Colorado National Speedway.

In 2019, Manami Kobayashi became the third woman to win a race in a NASCAR touring series race. She won in her debut in Whelen Euro Series Elite Club Division by lapping just 0.001 seconds from the reference time. Another woman (Alina Loibnegger) finished second; this was the first time ever two women finished 1–2 in NASCAR history.

=== 2020s ===
Gracie Trotter, the second female driver to win in the West Series

In 2020, Gracie Trotter became the second female driver to win in the West Series, with her victory in the race at the Las Vegas Motor Speedway Bullring on September 26. That year, the series became sanctioned by ARCA and renamed the ARCA Menards Series West, so Trotter became the first female to win in the series under the ARCA name.

2021 saw a number of milestones for female drivers. Toni Breidinger, the first Arab American female driver in NASCAR, returned to the ARCA Menards Series for the first time since 2018, joining Young's Motorsports to compete part-time for them as part of the Truck Series team's first foray into ARCA. Young's also announced that she would make her debut in the Truck Series with them in their new part-time No. 82 truck. Trotter moved up from the West Series to the main ARCA Menards Series, where she remained in Toyota's driver development program and drive part-time for Venturini Motorsports in the team's No. 15 and No. 25 cars. Deegan moved up from the ARCA Menards Series to the Truck Series full-time, continuing to drive for David Gilliland Racing. Natalie Decker moved up from the Truck Series to the Xfinity Series, where she ran five races in the No. 23 car, jointly fielded by RSS Racing, Reaume Brothers Racing, and later Our Motorsports. Cobb planned on making her Cup Series debut in the spring Talladega race, driving the No. 15 for Rick Ware Racing and becoming the first female driver to race in the series since Patrick's retirement. However, due to the race not having practice and qualifying, NASCAR did not approve Cobb to compete in it, with her lack of prior Cup Series experience.

For 2024, Natalie Decker returned for a part time stint with DGM Racing. Hailee Deegan moved up to the Xfinity Series with AM Racing, before being released before the 2024 The Loop 110. Amber Balcaen and Toni Breidinger raced full time in the ARCA Menards Series and finished fourth and sixth in points respectively. Breidinger also raced in the Truck Series opener. Newcomer Isabella Robusto raced part time in all three ARCA Series, even earning a pole at Kansas, the first woman to win a pole in the main ARCA Series.

In March 2025, Live Fast Motorsports announced that British racer Katherine Legge would make her NASCAR Cup Series debut and compete in the Shriners Children's 500 at Phoenix Raceway. Legge qualified 37th and finished 30th after being involved in a wreck. On July 6, 2025, she scored a Top 20 finish on the Chicago Street Course, the best result for a woman in Cup since Patrick eight years prior — crossing the line in 19th for her best-ever result in the series.

In 2026, Hailie Deegan returned to the West Series full-time and scored her fourth win in the series in September at Madera Speedway.

=== Active female drivers ===
Katherine Legge	(United Kingdom) England	Cup Series (part-time); No. 78, Live Fast Motorsports
Natalie Decker	Wisconsin	O'Reilly Auto Parts Series (part-time); No. 35/53, Joey Gase Motorsports & No. 42, Young's Motorsports & No. 47, Mike Harmon Racing; Truck Series (part-time); No. 22, Team Reaume
Toni Breidinger	California	Truck Series (part-time); No. 26/27, Rackley W.A.R. & No. 20, McAnally–Hilgemann Racing
Dystany Spurlock	Virginia	Truck Series (part-time); No. 69, MBM Motorsports & No. 2, Team Reaume; ARCA Menards Series/ARCA Menards Series East (part-time); No. 66, MBM Motorsports
Isabella Robusto	South Carolina	ARCA Menards Series (full-time); No. 55, Nitro Motorsports
Jade Avedisian	California	ARCA Menards Series (part-time); No. 90/15, Nitro Motorsports; ARCA Menards Series East (part-time); No. 15, Nitro Motorsports; ARCA Menards Series West (part-time); No. 70/90, Nitro Motorsports & No. 13, Central Coast Racing
Lanie Buice	(Georgia (U.S. state)) Georgia	ARCA Menards Series (part-time); No. 77, Pinnacle Racing Group
Kadence Davenport	Iowa	ARCA Menards Series/ARCA Menards Series East (part-time); No. 7, CCM Racing
Rita Goulet	North Carolina	ARCA Menards Series/ARCA Menards Series East (part-time); No. 13, Integrity Autosports
Kenna Long	Michigan	ARCA Menards Series (part-time); No. 1/19, Maples Motorsports; ARCA Menards Series East (part-time); No. 1, Maples Motorsports
Logan Misuraca	Florida	ARCA Menards Series (part-time); No. 86, Clubb Racing Inc. with City Garage Motorsports & No. 34, WAV Racing with City Garage Motorsports
Alli Owens	Florida	ARCA Menards Series (part-time); No. 68, Kimmel Racing
Taylor Reimer	Oklahoma	ARCA Menards Series (part-time); No. 77, Pinnacle Racing Group & No. 13, Central Coast Racing; ARCA Menards Series West (part-time); No. 13, Central Coast Racing
Quinn Davis	Tennessee	ARCA Menards Series East (full-time); No. 85, City Garage Motorsports; ARCA Menards Series (part-time); No. 85, City Garage Motorsports & No. 89, Rise Racing; ARCA Menards Series West (part-time); No. 77, Performance P-1 Motorsports
Hailie Deegan	California	ARCA Menards Series West (full-time); No. 16, Bill McAnally Racing
Mia Lovell	Arizona	ARCA Menards Series West (full-time); No. 15, Nitro Motorsports; ARCA Menards Series (part-time); No. 15, Nitro Motorsports
Kenna Mitchell	California	ARCA Menards Series West (part-time); No. 13, Central Coast Racing

== Summary and statistics ==
Series	Most starts	Wins	Most top 5s	Most top 10s	Most poles	Most laps led	Highest points finish
Cup Series	D. Patrick (191)		S. Christian (1)	D. Patrick (7)	D. Patrick (1)	D. Patrick (64)	S. Christian (13th) (1949)
O'Reilly Auto Parts Series	P. Moise (133)		D. Patrick (1)	D. Patrick (7)	S. Robinson & D. Patrick (1)	D. Patrick (64)	D. Patrick (10th) (2012)
Truck Series	J. Cobb (233)		N. Decker (1)	H. Deegan (5)		J. Cobb (23)	J. Cobb (16th) (2014)
ARCA Menards Series^{[d]} (2020–present only)	T. Breidinger (62)^{[e]}		I. Robusto (14)^{[e]}	I. Robusto (27)^{[e]}	I. Robusto & L. Buice(1)^{[e]}	H. Deegan (86)^{[e]}	H. Deegan (3rd) (2020) & I. Robusto (3rd) (2026)
ARCA Menards Series East	K. Ruston (44)		K. Ruston (7)	K. Ruston (17)		D. Van Wieringen (140)	S. Moyer (4th) (2022)
ARCA Menards Series West	N. Behar (34)	H. Deegan (4) & G. Trotter (1)	H. Deegan (13)	N. Behar & H. Deegan (23)	H. Deegan (5)	H. Deegan (107)	H. Deegan (3rd) (2019) & G. Trotter (3rd) (2020)
Canada Series	I. Tremblay (22)			I. Tremblay (3)		J. Landauer (1)	I. Tremblay (12th) (2011)
Mexico Series	M. Reyes (28)		M. Reyes (8)	M. Reyes (20)	M. Reyes (1)	M. Reyes (4)	M. Reyes (6th) (2005)
FedEx Challenge Series	G. Ponce (16)		G. Ponce (4)	G. Ponce (13)			M. Limón (7th) (2010) & G. Ponce (7th) (2012)
Whelen Modified Tour	M. Fifield (153)			R. Dupuis (2)			M. Fifield (11th) (2023)
Whelen Euro Series Elite 1 Division^{[f]}	N. Maillet (22)		C. Perrin (2)	C. Perrin (5)			N. Maillet (12th) (2012 & 2013)
Whelen Euro Series Elite 2 Division	A. Casoli (49)			F. Linossi (9)			F. Linossi (9th) (2015)
Whelen Euro Series Elite Club Division	A. Loibnegger (4)	M. Kobayashi (1)	A. Loibnegger (2)	A. Loibnegger (3)			A. Loibnegger (6th) (2019)
Dash Series (1975–2003)	K. Schulz (48)	S. Robinson (3)	S. Robinson (18)	K. Schulz (27)	?	S. Robinson (152)	S. Robinson (3rd) (1988 & 1989)
Midwest Series (1998–2006)	M. Rhoads (1)						M. Rhoads (52nd) (2004)
Northwest Series (1985–2006)	K. Schmitt (3)						K. Schmitt (36th) (2001)
Southeast Series (1991–2006)	T. Kirk (109)		T. Kirk (10)	T. Kirk (37)	T. Kirk (2)	T. Kirk (119)	T. Kirk (7th) (1996)
Southwest Series (1986–2006)	M. Leonard (6)						M. Leonard (19th) (1986)
Southern Modified Tour (2005–2016)	R. Dupuis (11)			R. Dupuis (5)			R. Dupuis (14th) (2011)

== Historical list of drivers ==
=== NASCAR Cup Series ===
Formerly Strictly Stock Series (1949), Grand National Series (1950–70), Winston Cup Series (1971–2003), Nextel Cup Series (2004–07), Sprint Cup Series (2008–16), and Monster Energy NASCAR Cup Series (2017–19)

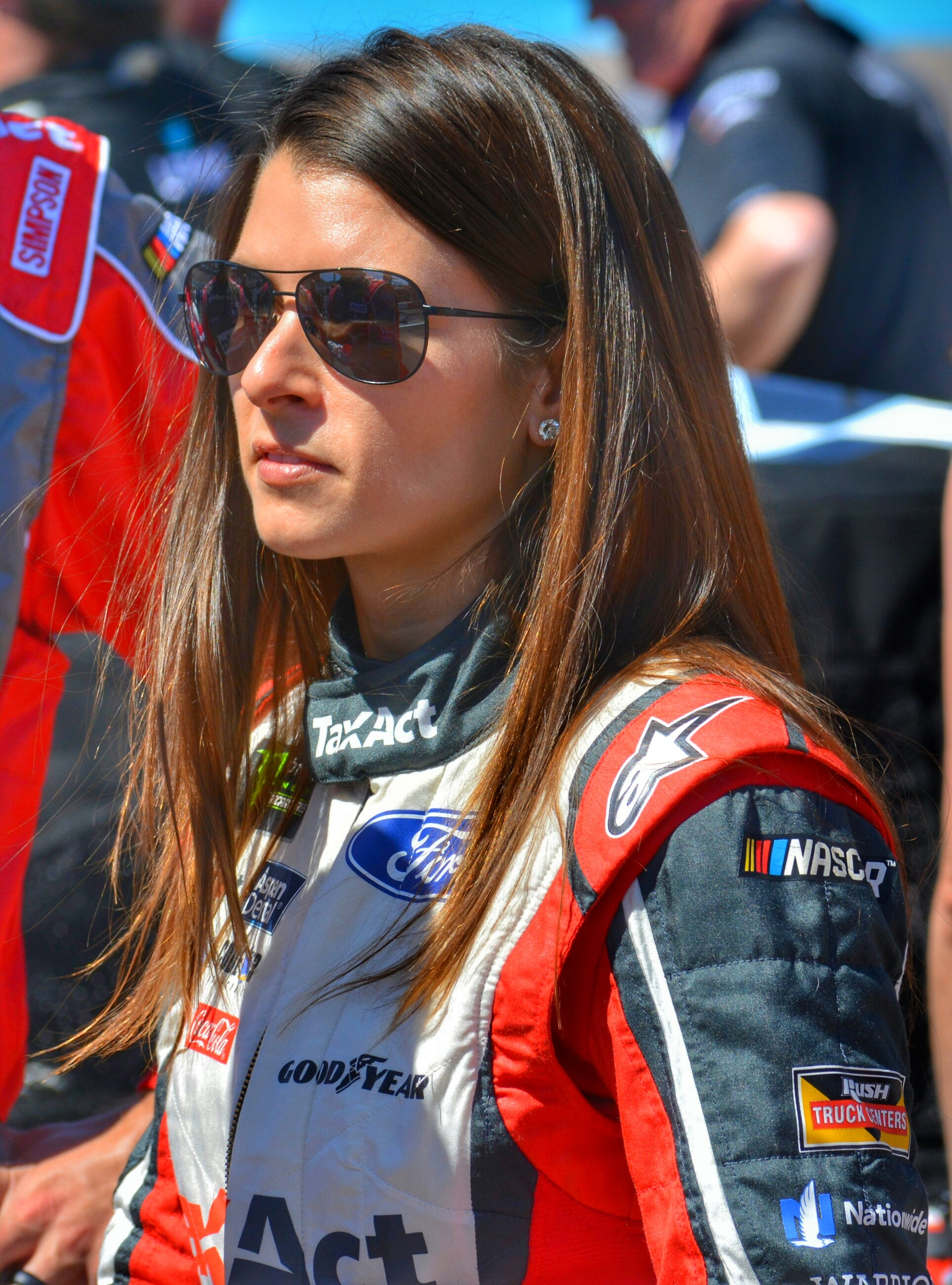
Danica Patrick scored the pole position at the 2013 Daytona 500 and scored the highest finish for a female in the Cup Series of 6th at the 2014 Oral-B USA 500.

Driver			No.	Active	Starts	Wins	Top5s	Top10s	Poles	Best points finish
Christine Beckers	(Belgium)	(Brussels)	93	1977	1	0	0	0	0	N/A
Ann Bunselmeyer	(United States)	(New York (state))	105	1950	1	0	0	0	0	126th (1950)
Ann Chester	(United States)	(New York (state))	72	1950	2	0	0	0	0	N/A
Sara Christian	(United States)	(Georgia (U.S. state))	71	1949–1950	7	0	1	2	0	13th (1949)
Janet Guthrie	(United States)	(New York (state))	68	1976–1980	33	0	0	5	0	23rd (1977)
Arlene Hiss	(United States)	(Connecticut)	38	(1976)	0	0	0	0	0	N/A
Laura Lane	(United States)	(California)	82	(1994)	0	0	0	0	0	N/A
Katherine Legge	(United Kingdom)	(Surrey)	78	2025-2026	9	0	0	0	0	37th (2025)
Marta Leonard	(United States)	(California)	46	(1986–1989)	0	0	0	0	0	N/A
Lella Lombardi	(Italy)	(Piedmont)	05	1977	1	0	0	0	0	N/A
Robin McCall	(United States)	(Texas)	5	1982	2	0	0	0	0	74th (1982)
Ethel Mobley	(United States)	(Georgia (U.S. state))	92	1949	2	0	0	0	0	52nd (1949)
Patty Moise	(United States)	(Florida)	45	1987–1989	5	0	0	0	0	59th (1988)
Marian Pagan	(United States)	(California)	52	1954	1	0	0	0	0	N/A
Goldie Parsons	(United States)	(North Carolina)	89	1965	1	0	0	0	0	N/A
Danica Patrick	(United States)	(Illinois)	10	2012–2018	191	0	0	7	1	24th (2015 & 16)
Shawna Robinson	(United States)	(Iowa)	49	2001–2002	8	0	0	0	0	52nd (2002)
FiFi Scott	(United States)	(California)	278	1955	2	0	0	0	0	216th (1955)
Dorothy Shull	(United States)	(South Carolina)		(1950)	0	0	0	0	0	N/A
Ann Slaasted	(United States)	(Wisconsin)		1950	1	0	0	0	0	N/A
Louise Smith	(United States)	(South Carolina)	94	1949–1952	11	0	0	0	0	63rd (1949)

Busch Clash results
Driver			No.	Active	Starts	Wins	Top 5s	Top 10s	Poles
Danica Patrick	(United States)	(Illinois)	10	2014–2017	4	0	1	2	0

Bluegreen Vacations Duel results
Driver			No.	Active	Starts	Wins	Top 5s	Top 10s	Poles
Janet Guthrie	(United States)	(New York (state))	68	1977–1980	3	0	0	1	0
Danica Patrick	(United States)	(Illinois)	10	2012–2018	7	0	0	3	1
Shawna Robinson	(United States)	(Iowa)	49	1995–2002	2	0	0	0	0

All-Star Open results
Driver			No.	Active	Starts	Wins	Top 5s	Top 10s	Poles
Patty Moise	(United States)	(Florida)	45	1988–1989	2	0	0	0	0
Danica Patrick	(United States)	(Illinois)	10	2013–2017	5	0	1	4	0

NASCAR All-Star Race results
Driver			No.	Active	Starts	Wins	Top 5s	Top 10s	Poles
Danica Patrick	(United States)	(Illinois)	10	2013–2016	3	0	0	0	0

=== O'Reilly Auto Parts Series ===
Formerly Budweiser Late Model Sportsman Series (1982–83), Busch Grand National Series (1984–94), Busch Grand National Division (1995–2003), Busch Series (2004–07), Nationwide Series (2008–14) and Xfinity Series (2015–2025)

Driver			No.	Active	Starts	Wins	Top 5s	Top 10s	Poles	Best points finish
Mackena Bell	(United States)	(Nevada)	23	2014	1	0	0	0	0	69th (2014)
Sherry Blakley	(United States)	(Texas)	83	(1994)	0	0	0	0	0	N/A
Jennifer Jo Cobb	(United States)	(Kansas)	13	2004–2018	31	0	0	0	0	29th (2011)
Amber Cope	(United States)	(Washington (state))	24	2011–2012	2	0	0	0	0	82nd (2011)
Angela Cope-Ruch	(United States)	(Washington (state))	78	2011–2018	14	0	0	0	0	55th (2011)
Erin Crocker	(United States)	(Massachusetts)	98	2005–2006	10	0	0	0	0	67th (2006)
Kim Crosby	(United States)	(Louisiana)	51	2004–2006	10	0	0	0	0	72nd (2004)
Claire Decker	(United States)	(Wisconsin)	77	(2016)	0	0	0	0	0	126th (2016)
Natalie Decker	(United States)	(Wisconsin)	23	2021–present	18	0	0	0	0	53rd (2021)
Paige Decker	(United States)	(Wisconsin)	97	2016	2	0	0	0	0	66th (2016)
Hailie Deegan	(United States)	(California)	15	2022–2024	18	0	0	0	0	32nd (2024)
Maryeve Dufault	(Canada)	(Quebec)	79	2011–2013	2	0	0	0	0	77th (2011)
Milka Duno	(Venezuela)	(Caracas)	87	2014	2	0	0	0	0	74th (2014)
Tina Gordon	(United States)	(Alabama)	39	2001–2004	14	0	0	1	0	51st (2004)
Lisa Jackson	(United States)	(North Carolina)		1982	1	0	0	0	0	135th (1982)
Tammy Jo Kirk	(United States)	(Georgia (U.S. state))	49	2003	15	0	0	0	0	45th (2003)
Katherine Legge	(United Kingdom)	(Surrey)	15	2018–2025	10	0	0	0	0	51st (2018)
Johanna Long	(United States)	(Florida)	70	2012–2015	42	0	0	0	0	20th (2012)
Debbie Lunsford	(United States)	(Georgia (U.S. state))	49	1989	1	0	0	0	0	85th (1989)
Patty Moise	(United States)	(Florida)	14	1986–1998	133	0	0	4	0	22nd (1990)
Alli Owens	(United States)	(Florida)	97	2016	1	0	0	0	0	79th (2016)
Danica Patrick	(United States)	(Illinois)	7	2010–2014	61	0	1	7	1	10th (2012)
Mara Reyes	(Mexico)	(Hidalgo (state))	49	2005	1	0	0	0	0	131st (2005)
Shawna Robinson	(United States)	(Iowa)	35	1991–2005	61	0	0	1	1	23rd (1993)
Kat Teasdale	(Canada)	(Ontario)	54	1998	1	0	0	0	0	109th (1998)
Diane Teel	(United States)	(Virginia)	19	1982–1986	11	0	0	2	0	40th (1983)
Chrissy Wallace	(United States)	(Missouri)	0	2010	2	0	0	0	0	106th (2010)

Pennzoil Challenge results
Driver			No.	Active	Starts	Wins	Top 5s	Top 10s	Poles
Patty Moise	(United States)	(Florida)	14	1996	1	0	0	0	0

=== Craftsman Truck Series ===
Formerly SuperTruck Series by Craftsman (1995), Camping World Truck Series (2009–2018, 2020–2022), Gander Outdoors Truck Series (2019), and Craftsman Truck Series (1996–2008, 2023–present),

Driver			No.	Active	Starts	Wins	Top 5s	Top 10s	Poles	Best points finish
Michele Abbate	(United States)	(Nevada)	30	2021	1	0	0	0	0	81st (2021)
Toni Breidinger	(United States)	(California)	5	2023–present	33	0	0	0	0	23rd (2025)
Jennifer Jo Cobb	(United States)	(Kansas)	10	2008–2024	234	0	0	1	0	16th (2014)
Amber Cope	(United States)	(Washington (state))	6	2010	1	0	0	0	0	104th (2010)
Angela Cope-Ruch	(United States)	(Washington (state))	44	2010–2020	18	0	0	1	0	31st (2019)
Madeline Crane	(United States)	(Georgia (U.S. state))	80	(2015)	0	0	0	0	0	111th (2015)
Erin Crocker	(United States)	(Massachusetts)	98	2005–2008	29	0	0	0	0	25th (2006)
Claire Decker	(United States)	(Wisconsin)	10	2016	2	0	0	0	0	105th (2016)
Natalie Decker	(United States)	(California)	54	2016–present	34	0	1	1	0	19th (2019)
Paige Decker	(United States)	(Wisconsin)	74	2015–2016	2	0	0	0	0	76th (2015)
Hailie Deegan	(United States)	(Wisconsin)	1	2020–2023	69	0	0	5	0	17th (2021)
Gabi DiCarlo	(United States)	(Arizona)	90	2009	3	0	0	0	0	54th (2009)
Milka Duno	(Venezuela)	(Caracas)	1	2014	1	0	0	0	0	103rd (2014)
Jessica Friesen	(United States)	(New York (state))	62	2021–2023	2	0	0	0	0	78th (2021)
Cassie Gannis	(United States)	(Arizona)	49	(2015)	0	0	0	0	0	116th (2015)
Tina Gordon	(United States)	(Alabama)	31	2003–2004	16	0	0	0	0	25th (2003)
Tammy Jo Kirk	(United States)	(Georgia (U.S. state))	7	1997–1998	32	0	0	0	0	20th (1997)
Johanna Long	(United States)	(Florida)	20	2010–2011	24	0	0	0	0	21st (2011)
Teri MacDonald	(Canada)	(Ontario)	72	2002–2004	7	0	0	0	0	55th (2002)
Alli Owens	(United States)	(Florida)	76	(2011)	0	0	0	0	0	119th (2011)
Cindy Peterson	(United States)	(Wisconsin)	63	(1996–1998)	0	0	0	0	0	113th (1998)
Deborah Renshaw	(United States)	(Kentucky)	8	2004–2005	38	0	0	0	0	24th (2005)
Shawna Robinson	(United States)	(Iowa)	49	2003	3	0	0	0	0	72nd (2003)
Natalie Sather	(United States)	(North Dakota)	50	(2012)	0	0	0	0	0	107th (2012)
Caitlin Shaw	(United States)	(New Mexico)	72	2009–2010	2	0	0	0	0	88th (2009)
Kelly Sutton	(United States)	(Maryland)	02	2003–2007	54	0	0	0	0	26th (2004)
Michelle Theriault	(United States)	(Connecticut)	72	2008–2010	6	0	0	0	0	68th (2009)
Dominique Van Wieringen	(Canada)	(Ontario)	02	2016	1	0	0	0	0	76th (2016)
Chrissy Wallace	(United States)	(Missouri)	03	2008–2009	7	0	0	0	0	42nd (2008)
Angie Wilson	(United States)	(North Carolina)	81	2002	4	0	0	0	0	51st (2002)

Eldora Heat Race results
Driver			No.	Active	Starts	Wins	Top 5s	Top 10s	Poles
Jennifer Jo Cobb	(United States)	(Kansas)	10	2014–2019	5	0	0	5	0
Madeline Crane	(United States)	(Georgia (U.S. state))	80	2015	1	0	0	1	0

Eldora Last Chance Qualifier results
Driver			No.	Active	Starts	Wins	Top 5s	Top 10s	Poles
Jennifer Jo Cobb	(United States)	(Kansas)	10	2014–2019	5	0	1	5	1
Madeline Crane	(United States)	(Georgia (U.S. state))	80	2015	1	0	0	1	0

=== ARCA Menards Series ===
Several women have qualified for and started at least one ARCA Menards Series race, like Danica Patrick, Leilani Munter, Alli Owens, Erin Crocker, Shawna Robinson, Sarah Cornett-Ching, Deborah Renshaw, Amber Cope, Angela Cope-Ruch, Maryeve Dufault, Toni Breidinger, Milka Duno, Jennifer Jo Cobb, Nicole Behar, Hailie Deegan, Natalie Decker, Christi Passmore, Shannon McIntosh and others. Although the series has existed since 1953, the series was not officially affiliated with NASCAR until its buyout on April 27, 2018. 2020 was the first season of ARCA as a NASCAR-sanctioned series, so this list begins with 2020. Also in 2020, the former K&N Pro Series East and K&N Pro Series West became the ARCA Menards Series East and ARCA Menards Series West, respectively.

ARCA Menards Series (2020–present only)

Driver			No.	Active	Starts	Wins	Top 5s	Top 10s	Poles	Best points finish
Amber Balcaen	(Canada)	(Manitoba)	30	2022–2025	45^{[c]}	0	0	14^{[c]}	0	6th (2024)
Toni Breidinger	(United States)	(California)	25	2021–2024^{[e]}	65^{[c]}^{[e]}	0	4^{[c]}	27^{[c]}^{[e]}	0	4th (2024)
Bridget Burgess	(Australia)	(Queensland)	88	2021–2022	2^{[c]}	0	0	0	0	107th (2021)
Mandy Chick	(United States)	(Kansas)	74	2022–2025	10^{[c]}	0	1	2	0	35th (2023)
Danica Dart	(United States)	(Washington (state))	07	2024	1^{[c]}	0	0	0	0	121st (2024)
Natalie Decker	(United States)	(Wisconsin)	52	2020–2023^{[e]}	31^{[e]}	0	0^{[e]}	0^{[e]}	12^{[e]}	7th (2018)^{[e]}
Hailie Deegan	(United States)	(California)	4	2020^{[e]}	27^{[c]}^{[e]}	0	5^{[e]}	21^{[c]}^{[e]}	0	3rd (2020)
Rita Goulet	(United States)	(Alabama)	31	2022–present	17^{[c]}	0	0	0	0	31st (2023)
Logan Misuraca	(United States)	(Florida)	63	2023–present	4	0	0	0	0	61st (2023)
Becca Monopoli	(United States)	(Florida)	85	2024–present	2^{[c]}	0	0	0	0	67th (2024)
Stephanie Moyer	(United States)	(Pennsylvania)	01	2021–2023	11^{[c]}	0	0	1	0	40th (2021)
Isabella Robusto	(United States)	(South Carolina)	55	2024–present	44^{[c]}	0	14	27^{[c]}	1	3rd (2026)
Amber Slagle	(United States)	(Michigan)	42	2022	2^{[c]}	0	0	0	0	57th (2022)
Gracie Trotter	(United States)	(North Carolina)	25	2020–2021	12^{[c]}	0	2	6^{[c]}	0	11th (2021)
Dominique Van Wieringen	(Canada)	(Ontario)	30	2020	1	0	0	0	0	85th (2020)
Brittney Zamora	(United States)	(Washington (state))	30	2021	1	0	0	0	0	117th (2021)

ARCA Menards Series East

Formerly Busch North Series (1987–2005), Busch East Series (2006–07), Camping World East Series (2008–09) and K&N Pro Series East (2010–19)

Driver			No.	Active	Starts	Wins	Top 5s	Top 10s	Poles	Best points finish
Amber Balcaen	(Canada)	(Manitoba)	22	2017–present	9^{[c]}	0	0	1^{[c]}	0	17th (2022)
Mackena Bell	(United States)	(Nevada)	21	2010–2014	36	0	2	5	0	13th (2013)
Toni Breidinger	(United States)	(California)	25	2022–present	13^{[c]}	0	2^{[c]}	5^{[c]}	0	10th (2024)
Kristin Bumbera	(United States)	(Texas)	94	2009	4	0	0	0	0	26th (2009)
Mandy Chick	(United States)	(Kansas)	74	2022–present	1^{[c]}	0	0	0	0	51st (2022)
Sarah Cornett-Ching	(Canada)	(British Columbia)	02	2015–2016	8	0	0	0	0	25th (2016)
Tiffany Daniels	(United States)	(Virginia)	94	2009	5	0	0	0	0	23rd (2009)
Natalie Decker	(United States)	(Wisconsin)	98	2019	1	0	0	0	0	46th (2019)
Hailie Deegan	(United States)	(California)	19	2018–2020	16^{[c]}	0	0	5^{[c]}	0	10th (2019)
Milka Duno	(Venezuela)	(Caracas)	18	2014	1	0	0	0	0	61st (2014)
Rita Goulet	(United States)	(Alabama)	31	2022–present	14^{[c]}	0	0	0	0	11th (2024)
Holley Hollan	(United States)	(Oklahoma)	50	2020	1	0	0	0	0	42nd (2020)
Ali Kern	(United States)	(Ohio)	4	2010–2016	17	0	0	1	0	12th (2016)
Julia Landauer	(United States)	(New York (state))	88	2017	2	0	0	1	0	30th (2017)
Liane Lombardi	(United States)	(Connecticut)	5	2002	1	0	0	0	0	70th (2002)
Logan Misuraca	(United States)	(Florida)	60	2022–present	2	0	0	1	0	42nd (2022)
Becca Monopoli	(United States)	(Florida)	85	2024–present	1^{[c]}	0	0	0	0	58th (2024)
Stephanie Moyer	(United States)	(Pennsylvania)	01	2021–2023	14^{[c]}	0	0	3	0	4th (2022)
Candace Muzny	(United States)	(Oklahoma)	92	2011–2012	2	0	0	0	0	55th (2011)
Danica Patrick	(United States)	(Illinois)	83	2010	1	0	0	1	0	45th (2010)
Shawna Robinson	(United States)	(Iowa)	35	1993	1	0	0	0	0	75th (1993)
Isabella Robusto	(United States)	(South Carolina)	55	2024–present	1	0	1	1	0	37th (2024)
Kenzie Ruston	(United States)	(Oklahoma)	96	2013–2015	44	0	7	17	0	6th (2013)
Karen Schulz	(United States)	(New York (state))	2	1989	1	0	0	0	0	65th (1989)
Amber Slagle	(United States)	(Michigan)	24	2022	1^{[c]}	0	0	0	0	52nd (2022)
Kat Teasdale	(Canada)	(Ontario)	94	1997	2	0	0	0	0	73rd (1997)
Michelle Theriault	(United States)	(Connecticut)	37	2007–2011	19	0	0	3	0	13th (2007)
Gracie Trotter	(United States)	(North Carolina)	99	2020–2021	2^{[c]}	0	0	1^{[c]}	0	42nd (2021)
Dominique Van Wieringen	(Canada)	(Ontario)	30	2016–2017	15	0	4	6	0	9th (2016)
Brittney Zamora	(United States)	(Washington (state))	99	2019	6^{[c]}	0	0	1	0	11th (2019)
Hanna Zellers	(United States)	(Indiana)	55	2017	1	0	0	0	0	56th (2017)

ARCA Menards Series West

Formerly Pacific Coast Late Model Division (1954–69), Grand National West (1970), Winston West Series (1971–93), Winston Transcontinental Series (1994), Winston West Series (1995–2003), West Series (2004–05), AutoZone West Series (2006), West Series (2007), Camping World West Series (2008–09) and K&N Pro Series West (2010–19)

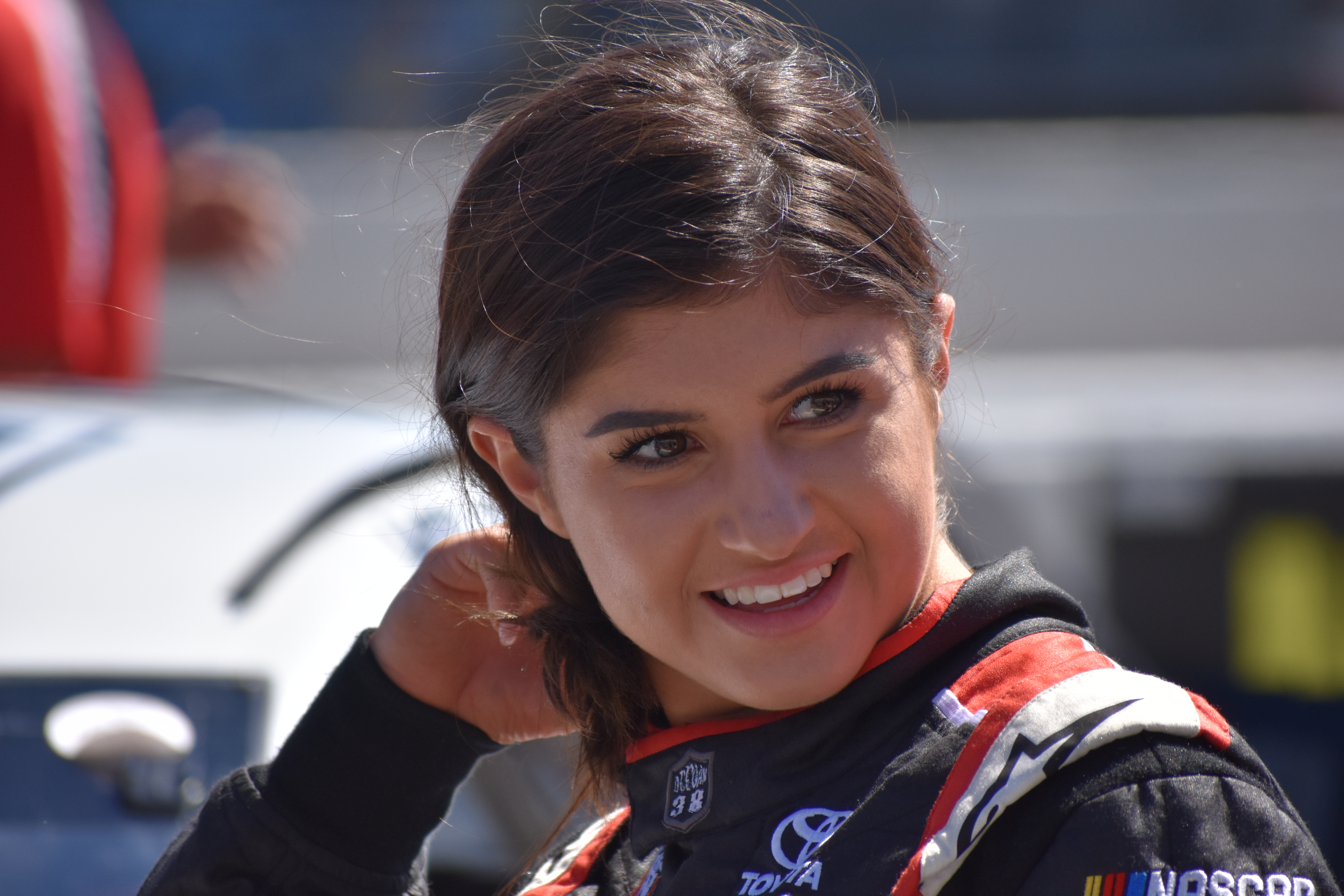
Hailie Deegan has won four races in the ARCA Menards Series West.

Driver			No.	Active	Starts	Wins	Top 5s	Top 10s	Poles	Best points finish
Amber Balcaen	(Canada)	(Manitoba)	19	2021–present	5^{[c]}	0	0	0	0	25th (2021)
Nicole Behar	(United States)	(Washington (state))	33	2014–2017	34	0	6	23	0	8th (2017)
Sharon Bishop	(United States)	(Washington (state))	96	1978–1981	28	0	0	3	0	9th (1979)
Mariah Boudrieau	(United States)	(Colorado)	77	2021–2023	4	0	0	0	0	22nd (2021)
Toni Breidinger	(United States)	(California)	25	2021–present	6^{[c]}	0	0	1^{[c]}	0	35th (2023)
Jessica Brunelli	(United States)	(California)	88	2011–2014	9	0	0	1	0	29th (2012)
Kaylee Bryson	(United States)	(Oklahoma)	17	2025–present	1	0	0	0	0	
Bridget Burgess	(Australia)	(Queensland)	88	2019–2022	31^{[c]}	0	0	9	0	7th (2022)
Sarah Burgess	(Australia)	(Queensland)	97	2022	1	0	0	9	0	47th (2022)
Kristin Bumbera	(United States)	(Texas)	00	2008–2009	4	0	0	0	0	37th (2008)
Danica Dart	(United States)	(Washington (state))	11	2024–present	4^{[c]}	0	0	0	0	26th (2024)
Melissa Davis	(United States)	(California)	79	2005	1	0	0	0	0	51st (2005)
Hailie Deegan	(United States)	(California)	19	2018–2019	28^{[c]}	3	13	23	5	3rd (2019)
Sarah Fisher	(United States)	(Ohio)	20	2004–2005	13	0	0	4	0	12th (2005)
Cassie Gannis	(United States)	(Arizona)	07	2011–2018	11	0	0	0	0	22nd (2012)
Janet Guthrie	(United States)	(New York (state))	26	1976	1	0	0	0	0	N/A
Katie Hettinger	(United States)	(Michigan)	02	2022	2	0	0	0	0	32nd (2022)
Arlene Hiss	(United States)	(Connecticut)	38	(1976)	0^{[b]}	0	0	0	0	N/A
Holley Hollan	(United States)	(Oklahoma)	50	2020	10	0	0	7	0	9th (2020)
Roxali Kamper	(United States)	(Utah)	39	2023	1	0	0	0	0	69th (2023)
Julia Landauer	(United States)	(New York (state))	54	2016–2017	28	0	8	20	0	4th (2016)
Marta Leonard	(United States)	(California)	46	1988	2	0	0	0	0	29th (1988)
Toni Marie McCray	(United States)	(California)	90	2010	2	0	0	0	0	48th (2010)
Candace Muzny	(United States)	(Oklahoma)	01	(2007)	0	0	0	0	0	N/A
Hannah Newhouse	(United States)	(Idaho)	46	2012–2016	7	0	0	2	0	29th (2015)
Marian Pagan	(United States)	(California)	52	1954	1^{[a]}	0	0	0	0	N/A
Hila Paulson	(United States)	(California)	54	1956–1957	2	0	0	0	0	N/A
Mara Reyes	(Mexico)	(Hidalgo (state))	82	2004	1	0	0	0	0	58th (2004)
Shawna Robinson	(United States)	(Iowa)	48	2001	1	0	0	0	0	52nd (2001)
Vanessa Robinson	(United States)	(New Mexico)	55	2016–2018	6	0	1	3	0	36th (2016)
Isabella Robusto	(United States)	(South Carolina)	55	2024–present	6^{[c]}	0	2	4^{[c]}	0	15th (2024)
Kristi Schmitt	(United States)	(California)	10	2004	2	0	0	0	0	40th (2004)
FiFi Scott	(United States)	(California)	278	1954–1955	4	0	0	0	0	N/A
Amber Slagle	(United States)	(Michigan)	17	2021–2022	6	0	0	3	0	23rd (2021)
Michelle Theriault	(United States)	(Connecticut)	77	2005	1	0	0	0	0	50th (2005)
Gracie Trotter	(United States)	(North Carolina)	99	2020–2021	13^{[c]}	1	7	12	0	3rd (2020)
Jolynn Wilkinson	(United States)	(Alabama)	1	2021	3	0	0	1	0	20th (2021)
Brittney Zamora	(United States)	(Washington (state))	99	2019–2020	15^{[c]}	0	6	10	2	5th (2019)

=== Whelen Modified Tour ===
Formerly Winston Modified Tour (1985–93) and Featherlite Modified Series (1994–2004)

Driver			No.	Active	Starts	Wins	Top 5s	Top 10s	Poles	Best points finish
Eileen Campbell	(United States)	(New York (state))	51	1995–1996	2	0	0	0	0	N/A
Amy Catalano	(United States)	(New York (state))	56	2019–2020	8	0	0	0	0	29th (2020)
Renee Dupuis	(United States)	(Connecticut)	90	1998–2013	115	0	0	2	0	18th (2005 & 2010)
Lauren Edgerton	(United States)	(Virginia)	72	2017	1	0	0	0	0	63rd (2017)
Melissa Fifield	(United States)	(New Hampshire)	01	2014–present	153	0	0	0	0	11th (2023)
Kelly McDougall	(United States)	(Connecticut)	19	(1995)	0	0	0	0	0	N/A

UNOH Showdown results
Driver			No.	Active	Starts	Wins	Top 5s	Top 10s	Poles
Renee Dupuis	(United States)	(Connecticut)	59	2011	1	0	0	0	0

Southern Slam 150 results
Driver			No.	Active	Starts	Wins	Top 5s	Top 10s	Poles
Lauren Edgerton	(United States)	(Virginia)	72	2017	1	0	0	1	0

=== International series ===
Mexico Series

Formerly Desafío Corona (2004–06), Corona Series (2007–11), Toyota Series (2012–14), Mexico Series (2015, 2023–present), PEAK Mexico Series (2017-2022)

Note: Only partial statistics available prior to 2008 season

Driver			No.	Active	Starts	Wins	Top 5s	Top 10s	Poles	Best points finish
Leslie González	(Mexico)	(Morelos)		2005	1	0	0	0	0	50th (2005)
Estefanía Reyes	(Mexico)	(Mexico City)	28	2007–2011	18	0	0	0	0	28th (2008)
Mara Reyes	(Mexico)	(Hidalgo (state))		2004–2005	28	0	8	20	1	6th (2004)

FedEx Challenge Series

Formerly Mexico T4 Series (2004–07), Mini Stock Series (2009–10), Stock V6 Series (2011–15)

Note: Only partial statistics available

Driver			No.	Active	Starts	Wins	Top 5s	Top 10s	Poles	Best points finish
María Limón	(Mexico)	(Jalisco)	18	2010	9	0	0	9	0	7th (2010)
Gisela Ponce	(Mexico)	(Aguascalientes)	23	2012–2014	16	0	4	13	0	7th (2012)
Regina Sirvent	(Mexico)	(Mexico City)	10	2021–present	24	0	1	14	0	8th (2022)

Canada Series

Formerly Canadian Tire Series (2007–15), Pinty's Series (2016-23)

Driver			No.	Active	Starts	Wins	Top 5s	Top 10s	Poles	Best points finish
Amber Balcaen	(Canada)	(Manitoba)	11	2023–present	2	0	0	0	0	54th (2023)
Sarah Cornett-Ching	(Canada)	(British Columbia)	25	2011	1	0	0	0	0	54th (2016)
Maryeve Dufault	(Canada)	(Quebec)	10	2010	2	0	0	0	0	44th (2010)
Shannon Harding	(Canada)	(New Brunswick)	36	2010–2011	4	0	0	0	0	43rd (2010 & 2011)
Caitlin Johnston	(Canada)	(Ontario)	01	2010	3	0	0	0	0	38th (2010)
Shantel Kalika	(Canada)	(Saskatchewan)	43	2018–present	17	0	0	1	0	19th (2019)
Destiny Klym	(Canada)	(Saskatchewan)	55	2017	3	0	0	0	0	29th (2017)
Shania LaForce	(Canada)	(Alberta)	01	2014–2016	2	0	0	0	0	51st (2016)
Julia Landauer	(United States)	(New York (state))	28	2018–2019	9	0	0	1	0	17th (2019)
Ashley Taws	(Canada)	(Ontario)	72	2008	1	0	0	0	0	44th (2008)
Erica Thiering	(Canada)	(Alberta)	87	2014–2015	11	0	0	2	0	17th (2015)
Sara Thorne	(Canada)	(Newfoundland and Labrador)	06	2022–present	4	0	0	1	0	46th (2022)
Isabelle Tremblay	(Canada)	(Quebec)	07	2010–2013	22	0	0	3	0	12th (2011)

Whelen Euro Series Elite 1 Division

The series exists since 2009, but was not officially affiliated with NASCAR until 2012. 2012 was the first season as a NASCAR-sanctioned series, so the list will be made from 2012 onwards.

Formerly Euro-Racecar NASCAR Touring Series Elite Division (2012) and Whelen Euro Series Elite Division (2013)

Driver			No.	Active	Starts	Wins	Top 5s	Top 10s	Poles	Best points finish
Michela Cerruti	(Italy)	(Lazio)	9	2015	2	0	0	0	0	38th (2015)
Jennifer Jo Cobb	(United States)	(Kansas)	10	2019	2	0	0	0	0	44th (2019)
Ellen Lohr	(Germany)	(North Rhine-Westphalia)	99	2019	9	0	0	0	0	24th (2019)
Nathalie Maillet	(Luxembourg)	Remich (canton)	46	2012–2013	22	0	0	1	0	12th (2012 & 2013)
Carole Perrin	(France)	(Rhône-Alpes)	42	2012–2014	16	0	2	5	0	16th (2012)

Whelen Euro Series Elite 2 Division

Formerly Euro-Racecar NASCAR Touring Series Open Division (2012) and Whelen Euro Series Open Division (2013)

Note: Full statistics only available beginning with 2014 season

Driver			No.	Active	Starts	Wins	Top 5s	Top 10s	Poles	Best points finish
Jessica Amendola	(Italy)	(Lombardy)	92	2013	1	0	0	0	0	40th (2013)
Gabriela Arantes Prado	(Brazil)	(Minas Gerais)	21	2015	11	0	0	0	0	15th (2015)
Carmen Boix	(Spain)	(Valencian Community)	1	2017–2018	24	0	0	5	0	11th (2017)
Caty Caly	(France)	(Yvelines)	42	2013	2	0	0	1	0	35th (2013)
Arianna Casoli	(Italy)	(Emilia-Romagna)	54	2016–2020	49	0	0	1	0	15th (2017 & 2019)
Jennifer Jo Cobb	(United States)	(Kansas)	10	2018–2019	3	0	0	0	0	38th (2018)
Zihara Esteban	(Spain)	(Basque Country (autonomous community))	9	2012–2013	8	0	0	3	0	19th (2012)
Michelle de Jesus	(Brazil)	(São Paulo (state))	92	2013	1	0	0	0	0	46th (2013)
Julia Landauer	(United States)	(New York (state))	11	2020	2	0	0	0	0	N/A (2020)
Francesca Linossi	(Italy)	(Lombardy)	99	2014–2015	18	0	0	9	0	9th (2015)
Nathalie Maillet	(Luxembourg)	Remich (canton)	46	2014	10	0	0	3	0	12th (2014)
Erika Monforte	(Italy)	(Friuli-Venezia Giulia)	88	2014–2016	19	0	0	2	0	10th (2014)
Carole Perrin	(France)	(Rhône-Alpes)	54	2015	12	0	0	5	0	10th (2015)

Whelen Euro Series Elite Club Division

Note: Only partial statistics available

Driver			No.	Active	Starts	Wins	Top 5s	Top 10s	Poles	Best points finish
Jacqueline Geiger^{[g]}	(Germany)	(Bavaria)	70	(2019)	0	0	0	0		N/A (2019)
Manami Kobayashi	(Japan)		2	2019	1	1	1	1		12th (2019)
Alina Loibnegger	(Austria)	(Carinthia)	66	2019	4	0	2	3		6th (2019)
Jennifer Maas	(Germany)	(North Rhine-Westphalia)	10	2018	2	0	1	2		7th (2018)
Nadine Vollekier	(Germany)	(North Rhine-Westphalia)	10	2019	2	0	0	2		9th (2019)

=== Defunct series ===
AutoZone Elite Division, Midwest Series (2004–06)

Formerly RE/MAX Challenge Series (1998–2002) and International Truck and Engine Corporation Midwest Series (2003)

Driver			No.	Active	Starts	Wins	Top 5s	Top 10s	Poles	Best points finish
Molly Rhoads	(United States)	(Minnesota)		2004	1	0	0	0	0	52nd (2004)

AutoZone Elite Division, Northwest Series (2004–06)

Formerly Northwest Tour (1985–86), Winston Northwest Tour (1987–94), REB-CO Northwest Tour (1995–97), and Raybestos Northwest Series (1998–2003)

Driver			No.	Active	Starts	Wins	Top 5s	Top 10s	Poles	Best points finish
Sharon Bishop	(United States)	(Washington (state))	96	1985–1986	2	0	0	0	0	65th (1986)
Kristi Schmitt	(United States)	(California)	10	2001–2002	3	0	0	0	0	36th (2001)
LeAnne Tanner	(United States)	(Washington (state))	32	1998	1	0	0	0	0	55th (1998)

AutoZone Elite Division, Southeast Series (2004–06)

Formerly Winston All Pro Series (1991–93), Slim Jim All-Pro Series (1994–2000), Gatorade All Pro Series (2001), Hills Bros. All Pro Series (2002), and Kodak Southeast Series (2003)

Driver			No.	Active	Starts	Wins	Top 5s	Top 10s	Poles	Best points finish
Tina Gordon	(United States)	(Alabama)	66	1999–2000	25	0	0	3	0	20th (1999 & 2000)
Tammy Jo Kirk	(United States)	(Georgia (U.S. state))	52	1991–1996	109	0	10	37	2	7th (1996)
Kristal Loescher	(United States)	(Florida)	0	1991	1	0	0	0	0	N/A
Noreen Mears	(United States)	(Alabama)	2	1992	2	0	0	0	0	72nd (1992)
Leilani Münter	(United States)	(Minnesota)	32	(2004)	0	0	0	0	0	57th (2004)

AutoZone Elite Division, Southwest Series (2003–06)

Formerly Featherlite Southwest Tour (1986–2002)

Driver			No.	Active	Starts	Wins	Top 5s	Top 10s	Poles	Best points finish
Tara Beattie	(United States)	(California)	22	(1999–2000)	0	0	0	0	0	149th (2000)
Cathy Howard	(United States)	(California)	13	1988–1989	4	0	0	0	0	23rd (1988)
Marta Leonard	(United States)	(California)	46	1986–1987	6	0	0	0	0	19th (1986)
Michelle Nagai	(United States)	(California)		(2002–2003)	0	0	0	0	0	118th (2003)
Kristi Schmitt	(United States)	(California)	20	2001	1	0	0	0	0	99th (2001)

Goody's Dash Series (1992–2003)

Formerly Baby Grand Division (1975–79), International Sedan Series (1980–82), Darlington Dash Series (1983–84), Daytona Dash Series (1985), Charlotte/Daytona Dash Series (1986–89) and Dash Series (1990–91)

Note: Only partial statistics available for the late 1970s

Driver			No.	Active	Starts	Wins	Top 5s	Top 10s	Poles	Best points finish
Sherry Blakley	(United States)	(Texas)		1991–1994	29	0	2	12	?	8th (1993)
Wendy Hicks	(United States)	(Alabama)		(2002)	0	0	0	0	0	74th (2002)
Stacy Holewiak	(United States)	(Massachusetts)		1994	1	0	0	0	0	N/A
Renee Kopstein	(United States)	(Virginia)		2001	1	0	0	0	0	72nd (2001)
Arlene Pittman	(United States)	(Georgia (U.S. state))	7	2002–2003	14	0	0	0	0	15th (2002)
Shawna Robinson	(United States)	(Iowa)	21	1988–1990	32	3	18	22	?	3rd (1988 & 1989)
Karen Schulz	(United States)	(New York (state))	78	1985–1988	48	0	10	27	?	5th (1988)
Kelly Sutton	(United States)	(Maryland)	02	2000–2003	30	0	0	5	0	8th (2003)
Lillian Vandiver	(United States)	(North Carolina)	8	1976–1978	10+	0	1?	4?	?	28th (1978)
Angie Wilson	(United States)	(North Carolina)	06	1999–2003	45	0	4	6	0	12th (1999)

Whelen Southern Modified Tour (2005–2016)

Driver			No.	Active	Starts	Wins	Top 5s	Top 10s	Poles	Best points finish
Renee Dupuis	(United States)	(Connecticut)	59	2011–2013	11	0	0	5	0	14th (2011)
Lauren Edgerton	(United States)	(Virginia)	7	2016	2	0	0	0	0	19th (2016)

== Notes ==
- ^{a} Pagan's one NASCAR start came at a combination race between NASCAR's premier national touring series (now Cup Series) and its west coast series (now ARCA Menards Series West). It is listed in both sections.
- ^{b} Hiss failed in her attempt to qualify for the Winston Cup Series and Winston West Series companion race at Ontario Motor Speedway in 1976. 81 drivers entered and only 40 made the race. She is listed in both sections.
- ^{c} Participations (starts, wins, Top 5s, Top 10s and pole-positions) in K&N East and K&N West companion races at Iowa Speedway and Gateway Motorsports Park in 2018 and 2019 are counted for both series per the source, (That includes Deegan's in 2018 and 2019 and Zamora's in 2019). Note: other drivers to have competed in the companion race in previous years are not so double-counted, per the same source. Starting in 2020, companion races between ARCA Menards Series and ARCA Menards Series East are also double-counted (That includes Deegan's in 2020; Moyer's & Trotter's in 2021; Balcaen's, Breidinger's, Chick's, Goulet's, Moyer's and Slagle's in 2022; Breidinger's and Goulet's in 2023; Balcaen's, Breidinger's, Goulet's and Monopoli's in 2024.), the same applies to companion races between ARCA Menards Series and ARCA Menards Series West (That includes Breidinger's, Burgess' & Trotter's in 2021; Balcaen's, Breidinger's and Burgess' in 2022; Breidinger's in 2023; Balcaen's, Breidinger's, Dart's and Robusto's in 2024).
- ^{d} A number of women qualified for and started at least one ARCA Menards Series race prior to NASCAR's buyout of the series including Danica Patrick, Leilani Munter, Alli Owens, Erin Crocker, Shawna Robinson, Sarah Cornett-Ching, Deborah Renshaw, Amber Cope, Angela Cope-Ruch, Maryeve Dufault, Toni Breidinger, Milka Duno, Jennifer Jo Cobb, Nicole Behar, Hailie Deegan, Natalie Decker and others. The series was founded in 1953, was purchased by NASCAR on April 27, 2018, and was officially NASCAR-sanctioned beginning in 2020.
- ^{e} Decker had 29 ARCA Menards Series starts between 2017 and 2019, with two Top 5s, 12 Top 10s and one pole-position, Deegan had 6 ARCA Menards Series starts in 2019, with one Top 5 and four Top 10s and Breidinger had three ARCA Menards Series starts in 2018, with one Top 10 but since 2020 ARCA Menards season was the first season as a NASCAR-sanctioned series these stats are not included.
- ^{f} The series exists since 2009, but was not officially affiliated with NASCAR until 2012. 2012 was the first season as a NASCAR-sanctioned series, so the list will be made from 2012 onwards.
- ^{g} Geiger competed at Hockenheimring in 2019 Whelen Euro Series Elite Club Division sharing the No. 70 Chevrolet Camaro with her father (Karl Geiger), but since he started in the car, he is scored in the race results.

== See also ==
- List of female racing drivers
- List of female Formula One drivers
- List of female Indianapolis 500 drivers
- List of female 24 Hours of Le Mans drivers
- List of female World Rally Championship drivers
- List of African-American NASCAR drivers
- List of Canadian NASCAR drivers
- List of Hispanic and Latin American NASCAR drivers
- List of Asian NASCAR drivers
