= Diane Teel =

American racing driver

- Born: Diane White; February 16, 1948 (age 78); Seaford, Virginia, United States

NASCAR O'Reilly Auto Parts Series career
- 11 races run over 4 years
- Best finish: 40th (1983)
- First race: 1982 Dogwood 500 (Martinsville)
- Last race: 1986 Hampton 200 (Langley)
| Wins | Top tens | Poles |
|---|---|---|
| 0 | 2 | 0 |

Diane Teel (née White; born February 16, 1948) is an American former professional stock car racing driver. She was the first woman to enter a NASCAR Busch Grand National Series (now called O'Reilly Auto Parts Series) race (in 1982). Teel raced eleven times in the series with two top-ten finishes.

Teel began her career as a courier for a racing driver while employed as a school bus driver on weekdays. Teel moved into the NASCAR Limited Sportsman Division in 1977 where she raced strongly, and in the following year became the first woman to win the series championship. She retired from racing in 1986 to spend more time with her family and continued as a school bus driver.

== Biography ==
Teel was born on February 16, 1948, in Seaford, Virginia, and is the daughter of Harry and Hilda White. She has one sister, Betty. Teel displayed tomboy characteristics from an early age, and often travelled with her father on fishing trips. Teel married mechanic Donnie Teel from nearby Williamsburg in 1965. She had two children with him. Teel started her career in auto racing as a courier for Donnie Teel's co-worker Dale Lemonds. She travelled across the states of Virginia and North Carolina searching for spare car parts, and air dried Lemonds' race car by driving it around a peach orchard. Outside of racing, Teel drove a school bus on weekdays in the York County area of Virginia as an additional source of income. She later won a school bus rodeo which involved a series of parking maneuvers, and driving around an obstacle course.

Afterward, the promoter of Langley Speedway Joe Carver and her husband entered her at the track which was later described as a "publicity type thing” for a local auto car parts store. In the race, Teel spun entering Langley Speedway's front stretch with four laps remaining, and the event was temporarily stopped to allow officials to clear the track. Nevertheless, Carver and Teel created a plan to enter her in a full season in the NASCAR Limited Sportsman Division in 1977. She drove a 1966 Chevrolet with the number 19 given to her by Baltimore-based car builder Raymond "Tiny" Slayton. In her début race, she finished eighth, and took one second-place along with two third-place finishes that year. She secured two victories along with several top-ten finishes in the 1978 season and clinched the series championship, which made her the first woman to win a NASCAR track title. She was the first woman to secure a victory at Langley Speedway that same year, which made her the first female to win a NASCAR-sanctioned auto racing event.

Teel received a phone call from former driver Bill Champion asking her to compete in the Baby Grand National Series (now called ISCARS Dash Touring Series) in 1979 at Atlanta Motor Speedway but she failed to qualify after recording the 44th fastest lap time. Teel spun early in the race and ran in second position with two laps remaining when fellow driver Billy Smith crashed out. Teel began competing in the NASCAR Budweiser Late Model Sportsman Series (now called Xfinity Series) in 1982. She qualified for the season's fourth round, the Dogwood 500 at Martinsville Speedway, making her the first woman to start a Budweiser Late Model Sportsman Series race. She finished in the 26th position, and raced three further events in the state of Virginia with her best result coming at Langley Speedway with an eighth-place finish. Teel ended the year 54th in the points standings.

Teel took her second (and final) top-ten finish in March 1983 at Martinsville. Teel retired from active competition in 1986 after rejecting a sponsorship package worth $1 million to spend more time with her family following a discussion with her husband about her future. She cited a long travel schedule as her reason. In September 1993, she was charged with contributing to the neglect of a child after she left off a six-year-old boy two miles from his house and was temporarily reassigned. Her bus driving career ended when she was involved in a road collision with another car. Teel subsequently battled with breast cancer for three years which was cured after extensive chemotherapy treatment. Teel currently takes part in a community awareness scheme to discourage distracted driving.

== Legacy ==
Teel has been described like several other female drivers as a "pioneer". She stated that she liked to compete, and felt she made the existence of women racing drivers more possible. Carver described her as "a good racer" who had more knowledge on how to improve a car's handling ability than some of her male rivals. Orvil Reedy, a driver with whom Teel competed against, said she had the capability to slow her car down heading into the corners, and was able to accelerate out of them comfortably. Her granddaughter, Macy Causey, currently competes in racing events at a local level. Teel's racing equipment was placed in display at the NASCAR Hall of Fame in Charlotte, North Carolina, in the spring of 2015.

== Motorsports career results ==
=== NASCAR ===
(key) (Bold – Pole position awarded by qualifying time. Italics – Pole position earned by points standings or practice time. * – Most laps led. Small number denotes finishing position)

==== Busch Series ====
NASCAR Busch Series results
| Year | Team | No. | Make | 1 | 2 | 3 | 4 | 5 | 6 | 7 | 8 | 9 | 10 | 11 | 12 | 13 | 14 | 15 | 16 | 17 | 18 | 19 | 20 | 21 | 22 | 23 | 24 | 25 | 26 | 27 | 28 | 29 | 30 | 31 | 32 | 33 | 34 | 35 | NBSC | Pts | Ref |
|---|---|---|---|---|---|---|---|---|---|---|---|---|---|---|---|---|---|---|---|---|---|---|---|---|---|---|---|---|---|---|---|---|---|---|---|---|---|---|---|---|---|
| 1982 | | 19 | Pontiac | DAY | RCH | BRI | MAR; 26 | DAR | HCY | SBO | CRW | RCH; 15 | LGY; 8 | DOV | HCY | CLT | ASH | HCY | SBO | CAR | CRW | SBO; 19 | HCY | LGY | IRP | BRI | HCY | RCH | MAR | CLT | HCY | MAR | | | | | | | 54th | 451 | |
| 1983 | | 19 | Pontiac | DAY | RCH | CAR | HCY | MAR; 10 | NWS | SBO | GPS | LGY; 17 | DOV | BRI | CLT | SBO | HCY | ROU | SBO | ROU | CRW | ROU | SBO | HCY | LGY; 15 | IRP | GPS | BRI | HCY | DAR | RCH | NWS | SBO | MAR; 12 | ROU | CLT | HCY | MAR; 20 | 40th | 594 | |
| 1984 | | 19 | Pontiac | DAY | RCH | CAR | HCY | MAR; 31 | DAR | ROU | NSV | LGY | MLW | DOV | CLT | SBO | HCY | ROU | SBO | ROU | HCY | IRP | LGY | SBO | BRI | DAR | RCH | NWS | CLT | HCY | CAR | MAR | | | | | | | 95th | 70 | |
| 1986 | | 19 | Pontiac | DAY | CAR | HCY | MAR | BRI | DAR | SBO | LGY; 21 | JFC | DOV | CLT | SBO | HCY | ROU | IRP | SBO | RAL | OXF | SBO | HCY | LGY | ROU | BRI | DAR | RCH | DOV | MAR | ROU | CLT | CAR | MAR | | | | | 106th | – | |

== See also ==
- List of female NASCAR drivers
