= Robin McCall =

American racing driver (born 1964)

Robin McCall Dallenbach
- Born: Robin McCall; January 20, 1964 (age 62); San Antonio, Texas, U.S.

NASCAR Cup Series career
- 2 races run over 1 year
- Best finish: 74th (1982)
- First race: 1982 Gabriel 400 (Michigan)
- Last race: 1982 Champion Spark Plug 400 (Michigan)
Wins	Top tens	Poles
0	0	0

Robin McCall Dallenbach (born January 20, 1964) is an American former stock car racing driver and driving instructor. She was the second woman to compete in the modern era of the NASCAR Winston Cup Series in 1982 and was the youngest woman to qualify for an event. McCall is married to fellow race car driver Wally Dallenbach Jr. and has three children.

== Career ==
McCall was born and raised in San Antonio, Texas. She went to McArthur High School. McCall began racing at the age of eight and was influenced by her father Bob, who owned a machine and sheet metal shop. Her grandfather Roy participated in midget events and retired when Bob was in early childhood. McCall's main area of racing was driving in quarter midgets until she was 14, winning several championships. with more than 250 victories on short tracks. She entered the Limited Late Model championship in 1979 and took ten feature race victories, including six trophy dash wins and two heat race victories. McCall won the series' rookie of the year accolade. That same year, she was the first female driver to take part in the Texas Race of Champions held at Texas World Speedway. In 1981, McCall drove in the Southeastern-based All Pro Late Model Series behind the wheel of a Chevrolet Camaro, and clinched several top-five finishes, along with ten victories from 16 feature events.

McCall began competing in the NASCAR Winston Cup Series (today the NASCAR Cup Series) in 1982, driving the No. 5 Jim Stacy Racing Buick. Jim Stacy, a former stock car driver, offered her a test in his car after he saw her compete at New Smyrna Speedway and McCall later signed a five-year contract at Daytona International Speedway in February that year. It was planned that she would enter five races in 1982, and Stacy along with co-owner Robert Harrington and McCall's father elected not to enter her in the Firecracker 400 as they felt she needed more experience. In the first race McCall entered (at Charlotte Motor Speedway), she failed to qualify after the qualifier was rained out. Three races later, McCall made the field by starting 29th for the Gabriel 400 at Michigan International Speedway, making her the youngest woman to qualify for a NASCAR Cup Series race at the age of 18. In the race, she retired due to an engine failure. McCall started her second race five events later but crashed out, and failed to qualify for the second race at Charlotte Motor Speedway. Afterward, she was affected with financial difficulties and dropped out of the series.

She switched to racing on short and dirt tracks in Late Model Stock Cars before she went into road course racing. McCall drove in the IMSA GT Championship in 1984, and her finish in the series with a second-place. She was voted the IMSA GT Championship rookie of the year. In 1985, she competed in the 24 Hours of Daytona. That same year, she married fellow race car driver Wally Dallenbach Jr. having known him for one year. With him, she has three children (Jake, Wyatt, and Kate). She took part in the One Lap of America Rally in 1986 and 1987, and later worked as a pace car driver in the Indy Car World Series between 1995 and 1998. She currently works as a driving instructor for automobile manufacturers in driving events, and co-authored a book Portrait of NASCAR. McCall also competes in trap shooting events and acts as a Precision/Stunt Driver in films and commercials.

== Motorsports career results ==
=== NASCAR ===
(key) (Bold – Pole position awarded by qualifying time. Italics – Pole position earned by points standings or practice time. * – Most laps led. Small number denotes finishing position.)

==== Winston Cup Series ====
NASCAR Winston Cup Series results
Year	Team	No.	Make	1	2	3	4	5	6	7	8	9	10	11	12	13	14	15	16	17	18	19	20	21	22	23	24	25	26	27	28	29	30	NWCC	Pts	Ref
1982	Jim Stacy Racing	5	Buick	DAY	RCH	BRI	ATL	CAR	DAR	NWS	MAR	TAL	NSV	DOV	CLT; DNQ	POC	RSD	MCH; 29	DAY	NSV	POC	TAL	MCH; 33	BRI	DAR	RCH	DOV	NWS	CLT; DNQ	MAR	CAR	ATL	RSD	74th	140	

== See also ==
- List of female NASCAR drivers
