= 1982 Champion Spark Plug 400 =

Race details
- Race 20 of 30 in the 1982 NASCAR Winston Cup Series season
- 1982 Champion Spark Plug 400 program cover
- Date: August 22, 1982
- Official name: Champion Spark Plug 400
- Location: Michigan International Speedway, Brooklyn, Michigan
- Course: Permanent racing facility
- Course length: 2.000 miles (3.218 km)
- Distance: 200 laps, 400 mi (643 km)
- Weather: Temperatures approaching 72 °F (22 °C); wind speeds up to 11.8 miles per hour (19.0 km/h)
- Average speed: 136.454 miles per hour (219.601 km/h)

Pole position
| Driver | Bill Elliott | Melling Racing |
- Time: 44.173

Most laps led
| Driver | Bobby Allison | DiGard Motorsports |
- Laps: 120

Winner
| No. 88 | Bobby Allison | DiGard Motorsports |

Television in the United States
- Network: untelevised
- Announcers: none

The 1982 Champion Spark Plug 400 was a NASCAR Winston Cup Series race held on August 22, 1982, at Michigan International Speedway in Brooklyn, Michigan.

== Background ==
Michigan International Speedway is a four-turn superspeedway that is 2 miles (3.2 km) long. Groundbreaking took place on September 28, 1967. Over 2.5 million cubic yards (1.9×10^{6} m^{3}) of dirt were moved to form the D-shaped oval. The track opened in 1968 with a total capacity of 25,000 seats.

The track was originally built and owned by Lawrence H. LoPatin, a Detroit-area land developer who built the speedway at an estimated cost of $4–6 million. Financing was arranged by Thomas W Itin. Its first race took place on Sunday, October 13, 1968, with the running of the USAC 250 mile Championship Car Race won by Ronnie Bucknum.

== Summary ==
It took two hours and forty-five minutes to complete this event. 38 American-born drivers competed on this 200-lap event; Joe Ruttman would become the last-place finisher due to a problem with his vehicle's oil pump on the second lap. Bill Elliott would end up finishing the race 96 laps behind the leaders while Tim Richmond would see the conclusion of his racing weekend by inflicting some damage to the back of his car on lap 161. This was the debut race for the Chrysler Imperial car of Buddy Arrington.

Thirty thousand people watched Bobby Allison best Richard Petty by two car lengths. Bill Elliott won pole position with a speed of 162.995 miles per hour (262.315 km/h). The final 50 laps would be monopolized by three different drivers (Richard Petty, Darrell Waltrip and Bobby Allison).

Terry Labonte would lead in championship points after this race; trailing by 50 points to Bobby Allison. The race average speed was 136.545 miles per hour (219.748 km/h). Ronnie Thomas and Al Loquasto did not qualify on time but were added to the field through what would come to be known as provisionals.

Tony Bettenhausen Jr. and Robin McCall would make their respective departures from the NASCAR Winston Cup Series after the conclusion of this event.

Notable crew chiefs to participate in the race were Buddy Parrott, Junie Donlavey, Joey Arrington, Elmo Langley, Darrell Bryant, Jake Elder, Travis Carter, Waddell Wilson, Tim Brewer, Bud Moore, Jeff Hammond, and Larry McReynolds.

Individual race earnings ranged from the winner's share of $26,900 ($89,743.97 when adjusted for inflation) to the last-place finisher's share of $1,850 ($6,171.98 when adjusted for inflation). $222,875 went to all the drivers of this event ($743,557.11 when adjusted for inflation).

=== Qualifying ===
| Grid | No. | Driver | Manufacturer | Qualifying time | Speed |
|---|---|---|---|---|---|
| 1 | 9 | Bill Elliott | Ford | 44.173 | 162.995 |
| 2 | 11 | Darrell Waltrip | Buick | 44.210 | 162.859 |
| 3 | 3 | Ricky Rudd | Pontiac | 44.444 | 162.002 |
| 4 | 28 | Buddy Baker | Pontiac | 44.513 | 161.750 |
| 5 | 67 | Buddy Arrington | Chrysler | 44.598 | 161.442 |
| 6 | 44 | Terry Labonte | Buick | 44.632 | 161.319 |
| 7 | 27 | Cale Yarborough | Buick | 44.657 | 161.229 |
| 8 | 1 | Kyle Petty | Pontiac | 44.731 | 160.962 |
| 9 | 2 | Tim Richmond | Buick | 44.753 | 160.883 |
| 10 | 88 | Bobby Allison | Buick | 44.768 | 160.829 |

== Results ==
| POS | ST | # | DRIVER | SPONSOR (OWNER) | CAR | LAPS | MONEY | STATUS | LED | PTS |
|---|---|---|---|---|---|---|---|---|---|---|
| 1 | 10 | 88 | Bobby Allison | Gatorade (DiGard Racing) | Buick | 200 | 26900 | running | 120 | 185 |
| 2 | 11 | 43 | Richard Petty | STP (Petty Enterprises) | Pontiac | 200 | 20505 | running | 13 | 175 |
| 3 | 15 | 33 | Harry Gant | 7-Eleven/Skoal Bandit (Hal Needham) | Buick | 200 | 13255 | running | 0 | 165 |
| 4 | 13 | 50 | Geoffrey Bodine | Performance Connection (Cliff Stewart) | Pontiac | 200 | 15200 | running | 2 | 165 |
| 5 | 14 | 55 | Benny Parsons | Weyman & Bruton (Johnny Hayes) | Buick | 200 | 6725 | running | 2 | 160 |
| 6 | 5 | 67 | Buddy Arrington | Tom Prange Leasing (Buddy Arrington) | Chrysler | 199 | 8845 | running | 2 | 155 |
| 7 | 2 | 11 | Darrell Waltrip | Mountain Dew (Junior Johnson) | Buick | 198 | 16300 | running | 20 | 151 |
| 8 | 28 | 71 | Dave Marcis | Throttle's Food & Fuel (Dave Marcis) | Buick | 197 | 6725 | running | 3 | 147 |
| 9 | 17 | 21 | Neil Bonnett | Warner Hodgdon/National Eng. (Wood Brothers) | Ford | 197 | 3150 | running | 1 | 143 |
| 10 | 20 | 47 | Ron Bouchard | J.D. Stacy (Jack Beebe) | Buick | 197 | 10050 | running | 0 | 134 |
| 11 | 24 | 52 | Jimmy Means | Broadway Motors (Jimmy Means) | Buick | 197 | 5715 | running | 0 | 130 |
| 12 | 19 | 17 | Lake Speed | Yazoo Mowers (Roger Hamby) | Buick | 197 | 5405 | running | 0 | 127 |
| 13 | 27 | 77 | Dean Combs | Sports Specs/R.L. Monroe (Irv Sanderson) | Buick | 196 | 2250 | running | 0 | 124 |
| 14 | 3 | 3 | Ricky Rudd | Piedmont Airlines (Richard Childress) | Pontiac | 195 | 5160 | running | 0 | 121 |
| 15 | 8 | 1 | Kyle Petty | UNO / STP (Hoss Ellington) | Pontiac | 195 | 2100 | running | 0 | 118 |
| 16 | 21 | 70 | J.D. McDuffie | Bailey Excavating (J.D. McDuffie) | Pontiac | 193 | 5175 | running | 0 | 115 |
| 17 | 38 | 42 | Ronnie Thomas | Thomas Racing (Ronnie Thomas) | Pontiac | 193 | 1850 | running | 0 | 112 |
| 18 | 32 | 40 | Joe Booher | Booher Farms (D.K. Ulrich) | Buick | 192 | 1750 | running | 0 | 109 |
| 19 | 31 | 19 | Charlie Baker | H.M. Kelly Trucking (Henley Gray) | Buick | 192 | 1700 | running | 0 | 106 |
| 20 | 30 | 64 | Tommy Gale | Sunny King Ford & Honda (Elmo Langley) | Ford | 191 | 4165 | running | 0 | 103 |
| 21 | 6 | 44 | Terry Labonte | Texas Jeans/Stratagraph (Billy Hagan) | Buick | 187 | 3850 | running | 0 | 100 |
| 22 | 36 | 48 | James Hylton | Palatine Auto Parts (James Hylton) | Chevrolet | 179 | 3595 | running | 0 | 97 |
| 23 | 9 | 2 | Tim Richmond | Stacy-Pak (Jim Stacy) | Buick | 161 | 3275 | rear end | 1 | 99 |
| 24 | 33 | 24 | Tony Bettenhausen Jr | Provimi Veal (Cecil Gordon) | Buick | 139 | 3215 | engine | 0 | 91 |
| 25 | 4 | 28 | Buddy Baker | J.D. Stacy (Harry Ranier) | Pontiac | 109 | 9525 | radiator | 0 | 88 |
| 26 | 25 | 90 | Jody Ridley | J.D. Stacy (Junie Donlavey) | Ford | 108 | 8750 | engine | 0 | 85 |
| 27 | 1 | 9 | Bill Elliott | Melling Tool (Harry Melling) | Ford | 104 | 3500 | running | 6 | 87 |
| 28 | 7 | 27 | Cale Yarborough | Valvoline (M.C. Anderson) | Buick | 103 | 1250 | transmission | 28 | 84 |
| 29 | 35 | 54 | David Simko | GNF Prototype Casting (Elmer Simko) | Buick | 96 | 1200 | engine | 0 | 76 |
| 30 | 18 | 15 | Dale Earnhardt | Wrangler Jeans (Bud Moore) | Ford | 76 | 8750 | brakes | 0 | 73 |
| 31 | 22 | 03 | David Pearson | Carolina Tool (Bobby Hawkins) | Buick | 75 | 1100 | oil pump | 0 | 70 |
| 32 | 12 | 98 | Morgan Shepherd | Levi Garrett (Ron Benfield) | Buick | 68 | 2805 | sway bar | 2 | 72 |
| 33 | 29 | 5 | Robin McCall | Stacy-Pak (Jim Stacy) | Buick | 47 | 1000 | crash | 0 | 64 |
| 34 | 23 | 02 | Mark Martin | Briarwood Hilton (Bud Reeder) | Pontiac | 45 | 2685 | rear end | 0 | 61 |
| 35 | 26 | 36 | H.B. Bailey | Almeda Auto Parts (H.B. Bailey) | Pontiac | 42 | 900 | handling | 0 | 58 |
| 36 | 37 | 6 | Al Loquasto | Pentax Cameras (D.K. Ulrich) | Buick | 18 | 1850 | crash | 0 | 55 |
| 37 | 34 | 13 | Earle Canavan | JOB/Wyandotte Vapocure/Wynns (Earle Canavan) | Oldsmobile | 7 | 850 | engine | 0 | 52 |
| 38 | 16 | 75 | Joe Ruttman | Pet Dairy (Rahmoc Enterprises) | Buick | 2 | 1850 | oil pump | 0 | 49 |
Failed to qualify
| POS | NAME | NBR | SPONSOR | OWNER | CAR | | | | | |
| | Marty Robbins | | | | | | | | | |
| | Gil Roth | | | | | | | | | |
| | Bill Scott | | | | | | | | | |
| | Bob Slawinski | | | | | | | | | |
| | Bobby Wawak | | | | | | | | | |

== Timeline ==
Section reference:

- Start of race: Bill Elliott has the pole position to begin the race with.
- Lap 2: Joe Ruttman's oil pump became problematic, forcing him to become the last-place finisher.
- Lap 3: Caution for spun tire on turn three, green flag racing resumed on lap 6.
- Lap 7: Earle Canavan's engine stopped working properly.
- Lap 18: Al Loquasto had a terminal crash.
- Lap 21: Caution due to a five-car accident, green flag racing resumed on lap 26.
- Lap 42: H.B. Bailey could not handle his vehicle properly, forcing him to exit the race.
- Lap 45: Mark Martin lost the rear end of his vehicle.
- Lap 47: Robin McCall had a terminal crash.
- Lap 51: Caution due to Robin McCall's accident, green flag racing resumed on lap 26.
- Lap 68: The sway bar from Morgan Shepherd's vehicle came off, ending his race weekend early.
- Lap 75: David Pearson's oil pump stopped working properly.
- Lap 76: Dale Earnhardt's vehicle developed serious brake issues.
- Lap 84: Caution due to rain, green flag racing resumed on lap 92.
- Lap 96: Dave Simko's engine became more than a nuisance for him, causing him to leave the race.
- Lap 103: Cale Yarborough's transmission problems ended his hopes of finishing the race.
- Lap 108: Jody Ridley managed to blow the engine of his vehicle.
- Lap 109: Buddy Baker's radiator stopped working properly.
- Lap 115: Caution due to debris; green flag racing resumed on lap 118.
- Lap 139: Tony Bettenhausen Jr.'s engine caused him to end his race weekend prematurely.
- Lap 161: Tim Richmond managed to lose the rear end of his vehicle.
- Finish: Bobby Allison was officially declared the winner of the event.

== Standings after the race ==
| Pos | Driver | Points | Differential |
|---|---|---|---|
| 1 | Bobby Allison | 2962 | 0 |
| 2 | Terry Labonte | 2912 | -50 |
| 3 | Darrell Waltrip | 2842 | -120 |
| 4 | Richard Petty | 2537 | -425 |
| 5 | Buddy Arrington | 2524 | -438 |
| 6 | Dave Marcis | 2493 | -469 |
| 7 | Harry Gant | 2460 | -502 |
| 8 | Ron Bouchard | 2389 | -573 |
| 9 | Dale Earnhardt | 2385 | -577 |
| 10 | Morgan Shepherd | 2312 | -650 |

| Preceded by 1982 Talladega 500 | NASCAR Winston Cup Series Season; 1982 | Succeeded by 1982 Busch 500 |
