= Renee Dupuis =

American racing driver (born 1972)

- Nationality: American
- Born: December 21, 1972 (age 53) Glastonbury, Connecticut, U.S.

NASCAR Whelen Modified Tour career
- Debut season: 1998
- Years active: 1998–2013
- Starts: 115
- Championships: 0
- Wins: 0
- Poles: 0
- Best finish: 18th in 2005, 2010
- Statistics up to date as of August 27, 2024.

Renee Dupuis (born December 21, 1972) is an American professional stock car racing driver who competed in the NASCAR Whelen Modified Tour from 1998 to 2013. Dupuis was the first and only winner in the Modified Division at the now-defunct Riverside Park Speedway.

Dupuis is also the Director of Monaco Modified Series Development.

Dupuis has also previously competed in series such as the now defunct NASCAR Whelen Southern Modified Tour, the Tri-Track Open Modified Series, the Southern Modified Racing Series, and the Southern Modified Race Tour.

== Motorsports results ==
=== NASCAR ===
(key) (Bold – Pole position awarded by qualifying time. Italics – Pole position earned by points standings or practice time. * – Most laps led.)

==== Whelen Modified Tour ====
NASCAR Whelen Modified Tour results
Year	Team	No.	Make	1	2	3	4	5	6	7	8	9	10	11	12	13	14	15	16	17	18	19	20	21	22	NWMTC	Pts	Ref
1998	William Woodman	11	Chevy	RPS	TMP	MAR	STA	NZH	STA	GLN	JEN	RIV	NHA	NHA	LEE	HOL	TMP	NHA	RIV	STA	NHA	TMP	STA; 34	TMP	FLE	N/A	0	
1999	William Woodman	11	Chevy	TMP	RPS; DNQ	STA	RCH	STA; DNQ	RIV	JEN	NHA	NZH	HOL	TMP	NHA	RIV	GLN	STA	RPS; 16	TMP	NHA	STA; DNQ	MAR; DNQ	TMP		N/A	0	
2000	N/A	90	N/A	STA; DNQ	RCH	STA; DNQ	RIV	SEE; DNQ	NHA; DNQ	NZH	TMP; DNQ	RIV	GLN	TMP	STA; DNQ	WFD; DNQ	NHA									N/A	0	
2000	N/A	49	N/A															STA; DNQ	MAR	TMP; DNQ						N/A	0	
2001	N/A	54	Chevy	SBO	TMP	STA	WFD	NZH	STA	RIV	SEE	RCH	NHA	HOL	RIV	CHE	TMP; 29	STA	WFD	TMP	STA	MAR	TMP			101st	76	
2002	N/A	25	Chevy	TMP; 17	STA; 26	WFD; 11	NZH; 31	RIV; DNQ	SEE; DNQ	RCH; 26	STA; 18	BEE; 17	NHA; 25	RIV; DNQ	TMP; 19	STA; 21	WFD; 20		NHA; 31	STA; 25	MAR; 16	TMP; 25				21st	1696	
2002	N/A	25	Dodge															TMP; 25								21st	1696	
2003	N/A	25	Chevy	TMP	STA; 27	WFD; 21	NZH; 23	STA; DNQ	LER; 10	BLL; 12	BEE; 17	NHA; 29	ADI; 29	RIV; DNQ	TMP; 25	STA; DNQ	WFD; 13	TMP; 17	NHA; 35	STA; DNQ	TMP; DNQ					24th	1416	
2004	William Woodman	90	Chevy	TMP; 14	STA; 21	WFD; 23	NZH; 28	STA; 22	RIV; DNQ	LER; 28	WAL; 12	BEE; 20	NHA; 29	SEE; 25	RIV; DNQ	STA; 18	TMP; 12	WFD; 17	TMP; 36	NHA; 30	STA; 25	TMP; 29				20th	1732	
2005	William Woodman	90	Chevy	TMP; 16	STA; 16	RIV; 18	WFD; 25	STA; 15	JEN; 27	NHA; 32	BEE; 18	SEE; 28	RIV; DNQ	STA; 27	TMP; 19	WFD; 17	MAR; 15	TMP; 26	NHA; 32	STA; 19	TMP; 26					18th	1710	
2006	William Woodman	90	Chevy	TMP; 26	STA; 22	JEN	TMP; 22	STA; DNQ	NHA; 18	HOL	RIV	STA	TMP; 17	MAR	TMP; 23	NHA	WFD	TMP; 27	STA							34th	686	
2007	William Woodman	90	Chevy	TMP; 35	STA; 17	WTO; DNQ	STA; DNQ	TMP; 30	NHA	TSA	RIV	STA; 16	TMP; 36	MAN	MAR	NHA	TMP; 18	STA; 26	TMP; 10							30th	854	
2008	William Woodman	90	Chevy	TMP; 17	STA; 26	STA; DNQ	TMP; 11					TMP; 28	MAN	TMP; 24	NHA; 23	MAR	CHE	STA; 23	TMP; 26							29th	959	
2008	William Woodman	90	Ford					NHA; 34	SPE	RIV	STA; DNQ															29th	959	
2009	William Woodman	90	Chevy	TMP; 18	STA; 32	STA; 31	NHA; 36	SPE; 26	RIV	STA; 24	BRI	TMP; 28	NHA; 14	MAR	STA; 32	TMP; 19										27th	850	
2010	William Woodman	90	Chevy	TMP; 13	STA; 18	STA; 18	MAR; 26	NHA; 20	LIM; 13	MND; 18	RIV; 25	STA; 13	TMP; 20	BRI; 23	NHA; 23	STA; 14	TMP; 24									18th	1478	
2011	Ed Bennett III	59	Chevy	TMP	STA	STA	MND; 22	TMP	NHA	RIV	STA	NHA	BRI	DEL	TMP	LRP	NHA	STA	TMP							51st	97	
2012	Ed Bennett III	59	Chevy	TMP	STA	MND; 18	STA	WFD	NHA	STA	TMP	BRI	TMP	RIV	NHA	STA	TMP									44th	26	
2013	Kyle Bennett	59	Chevy	TMP	STA	STA	WFD	RIV	NHA	MND	STA; 26	TMP	BRI	RIV	NHA	STA	TMP									44th	18	

==== Whelen Southern Modified Tour ====
NASCAR Whelen Southern Modified Tour results
Year	Car owner	No.	Make	1	2	3	4	5	6	7	8	9	10	11	12	13	14	NSWMTC	Pts	Ref
2011	Kyle Bennett	59	Chevy	CRW	HCY; 9	SBO	CRW	CRW	BGS	BRI	CRW; 8	LGY; 13	THO; 11	TRI; 9	CRW	CLT	CRW	14th	672	
2012	Kyle Bennett	59	Chevy	CRW	CRW	SBO; 9	CRW; 16	CRW	BGS	BRI	LGY	THO; 20	CRW	CLT				25th	87	
2013	Ed Bennett III	59	Chevy	CRW	SNM; 22	SBO; 10	CRW	CRW	BGS	BRI	LGY; 16	CRW	CRW	SNM	CLT			22nd	84	
