= Mara Reyes =

Mexican racing driver (born 1977)

- Born: March 12, 1977 (age 49); Pachuca, Mexico

NASCAR O'Reilly Auto Parts Series career
- 1 race run over 1 year
- First race: 2005 Telcel-Motorola 200 (Mexico City)
Wins	Top tens	Poles
0	0	0

Mara Reyes (born March 12, 1977) is a Mexican stock car racing driver. Finding some success in the NASCAR Mexico Series, she started one race in what is now the NASCAR O'Reilly Auto Parts Series in 2005. Reyes currently races in the Super Copa Telcel with Arris Group sponsorship.

== Career ==
Reyes debuted in racing at the age of 10, as her father's co-driver in the Mexico-Cuernavaca Rally. In 1991, she started officially as a driver at the age of 14 in a regional championship, driving a tubular VW Beetle. There were 35 drivers at the championship, of which she was the only woman, and finished in the top-five and as Rookie of the Year. In 1992, Reyes took part in the GT II series, the National Resistance Championship, where she participated in 2-, 4-, 6-, 12- and 24-hour races. In her first 12-hour race, she finished sixth out of 30 drivers, and she placed 11th in the championship standings. Reyes was upgraded to the GT III series in 1993, and finished in the top 10 in each race, for an overall finish of ninth place in the championship. She won the Sport Merit Award, an annual award from the Government in Pachuca, Hidalgo.

In 1995, Reyes continued in the GT III series, where she won several podiums. In July, she was invited to represent Mexico in the "3rd Shell's Grand Prix Series" in El Salvador, in the Super-Tourism Series. She won third place in her category, and fifth place in the general race and received a special award from the El Salvador authorities. She drove in the "Neon Series Challenge", alternating with her father, where she won a Pole Position, and finished in 11th place in the Championship, of a total of 80 drivers. At the same time, she started racing the Nissan Prototypes and Trucks, although she was only in the last four races of the year. 1996 saw her invited by Daimler-Chrysler Mexico to take part in the Skip Barber Racing School Driver Course at Sears Point, CA. She continued at the Neon Series, representing the Chrysler Racing Team, and obtained three pole positions, one win, and a third place; finishing 12th in the championship, out of 120 total drivers. She also kept driving in the Trucks Series, finishing in eighth place of the Driver Standings.

In 1997, Reyes attempted to join a new series, the Mustang Series, finishing in fifth place in her first race. Unfortunately, due to lack of sponsorship, she was forced to withdraw from the series, but she continued in the Neon Series. In that series she won one race and finished second in another, with an overall tenth-place finish in the annual standings. She also finished in fourth place in the final Truck Series Standings. In 1998, she participated in four different series: Neon, Mustang, Truck and Formula Mexico. She finished in second in the overall standings in the truck series, being presented with the Scudería Rodríguez Award; she took seventh in the Fórmula México Championship, and ninth overall in the Mustang Series. She was the only woman who took part in all these Series. She would repeat her second-place finish in the Truck Series in 1999, and improved to eighth place in the Mustang Series, where she took a second-place finish in the last race of the year. She was received several awards during the year: the "Press Award" from Ford Motor Company; the "Best Female Driver Award" from the Scudería Rodríguez Foundation; and Hidalgo Government gave her the "Sportswoman of the Year" Award.

2000 saw Reyes traveling to Phoenix, Arizona to take part in Bondurant's Racing School. She would join the Autofin Team in the Mustang Series, improving to a fifth-place finish in the overall standings. She would also win the championship in the Trucks Series, as a member of the Continental Tires Team. She would repeat her Truck Series Championship the following year, in 2001. she participated in Dodge Pick-Ups Series, where she finished in second place; and took a fifth place in the Ford Mustangs Series. The Scudería Rodríguez Organization gave her the "Best Driver of the Year Award". 2002 would see her finish third in the Dodge Pick-Ups Series and a top-ten finish in the Mustang Series. However, 2003 was a disappointment for her, once again due to a lack of sponsorship. While she finished well, she only participated in three races during the course of the year, being in third place when she withdrew.

Despite her sponsorship difficulties in 2003, 2004 would see Reyes join The Scudería Telmex Team, participating in the new NASCAR Series in Mexico, Desafío Corona. She became the first Mexican and Latin woman to get a NASCAR license. In the inaugural race, she would win the first pole position in the history of stock-car racing in Mexico. She won several races on the circuit, finishing in sixth place in the driver standings. During the year travel to the United States to participate in NASCAR events. In North Carolina, she practiced in a Winston West NASCAR event, followed by her participation in a race in Irwindale, California, where she qualified in twenty-first place (out of 26 cars), and was the only Mexican driver to qualify. During the race she was in tenth place when she was issued a black flag, losing a lap, and finished eighteenth. In 2005, she would become the first Latin Woman ever to drive in the NASCAR Busch Series. She also took part in the Mexican NASCAR Series with the TELMEX team, finishing in eighth place on the final standings.

== Motorsports career results ==
=== NASCAR ===
(key) (Bold – Pole position awarded by qualifying time. Italics – Pole position earned by points standings or practice time. * – Most laps led.)

==== Busch Series ====
NASCAR Busch Series results
Year	Team	No.	Make	1	2	3	4	5	6	7	8	9	10	11	12	13	14	15	16	17	18	19	20	21	22	23	24	25	26	27	28	29	30	31	32	33	34	35	NBSC	Pts	Ref
2005	Jay Robinson Racing	49	Ford	DAY	CAL	MXC; 35	LVS	ATL	NSH	BRI	TEX	PHO	TAL	DAR	RCH	CLT	DOV	NSH	KEN	MLW	DAY	CHI	NHA	PPR	GTY	IRP	GLN	MCH	BRI	CAL	RCH	DOV	KAN	CLT	MEM	TEX	PHO	HOM	131st	58	

==== West Series ====
NASCAR West Series results
Year	Team	No.	Make	1	2	3	4	5	6	7	8	9	10	11	12	13	NWSC	Pts	Ref
2004	Dave Davis	82	Chevy	PHO	MMR	CAL	S99	EVG	IRW	S99	RMR	DCS	PHO	CNS	MMR	IRW; 18	58th	109	
