= Holley Hollan =

American professional stock car racing driver

- Born: November 8, 2001 (age 25); Broken Arrow, Oklahoma, U.S.

ARCA Menards Series East career
- 1 race run over 1 year
- Best finish: 42nd (2020)
- First race: 2020 Skip's Western Outfitters 175 (New Smyrna)

ARCA Menards Series West career
- 10 races run over 1 year
- Best finish: 9th (2020)
- First race: 2020 Star Nursery 150 (Las Vegas Bullring)
- Last race: 2020 NAPA/ENEOS 125 presented by West Coast Stock Car Hall of Fame (Kern)
| Wins | Top tens | Poles |
|---|---|---|
| 0 | 7 | 0 |
- Statistics up to date as of January 23, 2025.

Holley Hollan (born November 8, 2001) is an American professional stock car racing driver. She last competed part-time in the ARCA Menards Series West and ARCA Menards Series East, driving the No. 50 Toyota Camry for Bill McAnally Racing.

== Racing career ==
=== Early racing career ===
At the age of five, Hollan was inspired to go racing by watching other kids race at local tracks, and would start to race junior midget cars. When she turned seven, she would move up to micro sprints, winning several races. She would start traveling around the country to races as far as California and Wisconsin.

At the age of 12, Hollan would move up to 600cc micros. During that year, she would also win the Port City Junior Sprints championship in 2014.

=== Midget car racing and Chili Bowl ===
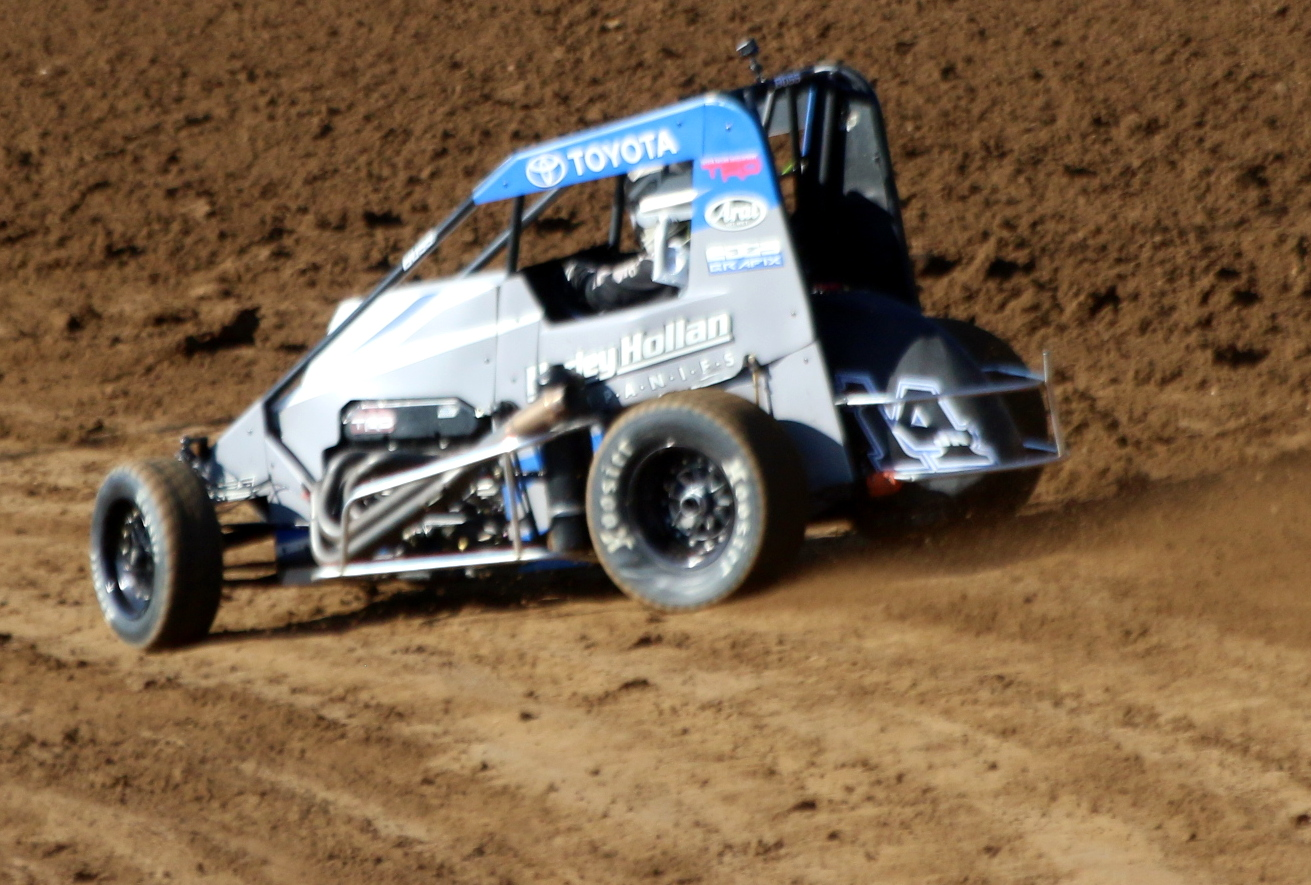
Hollan racing in her POWRi midget at Angell Park Speedway in 2018

Hollan would first race at the annual dirt midget event the Chili Bowl Nationals in 2018, being eliminated in the first I-main.

In 2019, Hollan would race again in the Chili Bowl, being eliminated after finishing 13th in the second D-main. Later that year, she would tie the record for the best finish by a female driver in a national midget feature event in the POWRi Lucas Oil series with a second-place finish.

In 2020, Hollan would race for Keith Kunz Motorsports, being eliminated in second H-main.

In 2021, Hollan would race once again for Keith Kunz Motorsports, being eliminated in the second E-main.

=== ARCA Menards Series West ===
Hollan was announced on January 14, 2020, to drive the full 2020 ARCA Menards Series West season for Bill McAnally Racing, driving the No. 50, along with select other races in other series for the team. She would first race in the ARCA Menards Series East opener that year, finishing 15th. She would fare better in the first half of the season, with four top-tens in six starts. However, she would miss the final race of the season.

== Personal life ==
Holley's father, Harley, was the third-generation racer in her family, making Holley a fourth-generation racer. Harley won the 2018 and 2020 POWRi Micro championships.

Hollan, after her first year of high school, attended Depic Charter Schools, an online school. She would graduate a year early to focus on her racing career.

== Motorsports career results ==
=== ARCA Menards Series East ===
(key) (Bold – Pole position awarded by qualifying time. Italics – Pole position earned by points standings or practice time. * – Most laps led.)

ARCA Menards Series East results
| Year | Team | No. | Make | 1 | 2 | 3 | 4 | 5 | 6 | AMSEC | Pts | Ref |
|---|---|---|---|---|---|---|---|---|---|---|---|---|
| 2020 | Bill McAnally Racing | 50 | Toyota | NSM; 15 | TOL | DOV | TOL | BRI | FIF | 42nd | 29 | |

=== ARCA Menards Series West ===
ARCA Menards Series West results
| Year | Team | No. | Make | 1 | 2 | 3 | 4 | 5 | 6 | 7 | 8 | 9 | 10 | 11 | AMSWC | Pts | Ref |
|---|---|---|---|---|---|---|---|---|---|---|---|---|---|---|---|---|---|
| 2020 | Bill McAnally Racing | 50 | Toyota | LVS; 12 | UMC; 9 | UMC; 10 | IRW; 11 | EVG; 6 | DCS; 7 | CNS; 7 | LVS; 9 | AAS; 6 | KCR; 15 | PHO | 9th | 448 | |
