= Ashley Taws =

Canadian racing driver (born 1983)

- Born: November 1, 1983 (age 43); Newmarket, Ontario, Canada

NASCAR Canada Series career
- 1 race run over 1 year
- Best finish: 44th (2008)
- First race: 2008 NAPA Autopro 100 (Montreal)
Wins	Top tens	Poles
0	0	0
- Statistics up to date as of 5 September 2012.

Ashley Taws (born November 1, 1983) is a Canadian racing driver.

Taws started racing at the age of nine when her father bought go-karts for her and her brother. Taws was a co-winner of the 2002 Rookie of the Year award for Canadian Formula Ford, a season in which she became the first woman in the race series to take a pole position. She was then injured as a passenger in a traffic accident; she sustained internal injuries and a broken back. She returned to racing in 2007. In 2008, she competed in the NASCAR Canadian Tire Series in selected races; she only qualified for one race, at Circuit Gilles Villeneuve, where she finished 32nd in the NAPA Autopro 100.

Both prior to her accident, and after her return, Taws was sponsored by Mattel with her driving a pink Barbie car.

As of 2023, Taws is an insurance broker in Newmarket, Ontario.

== Motorsports career results ==
=== NASCAR ===
(key) (Bold – Pole position awarded by qualifying time. Italics – Pole position earned by points standings or practice time. * – Most laps led.)

==== Canadian Tire Series ====
NASCAR Canadian Tire Series results
Year	Team	No.	Make	1	2	3	4	5	6	7	8	9	10	11	12	13	NCTSC	Pts	Ref
2008	Ashley Taws	72	Chevy	CAY	MSP	BAR	EUS	SUN	EDM	MON; 32	MSP	MON	CAY	BAR	RIV	KAW	44th	67	
