= Seaford, Virginia =

Unincorporated community in Virginia, US

Coordinates: 37°11′54″N 76°25′59″W

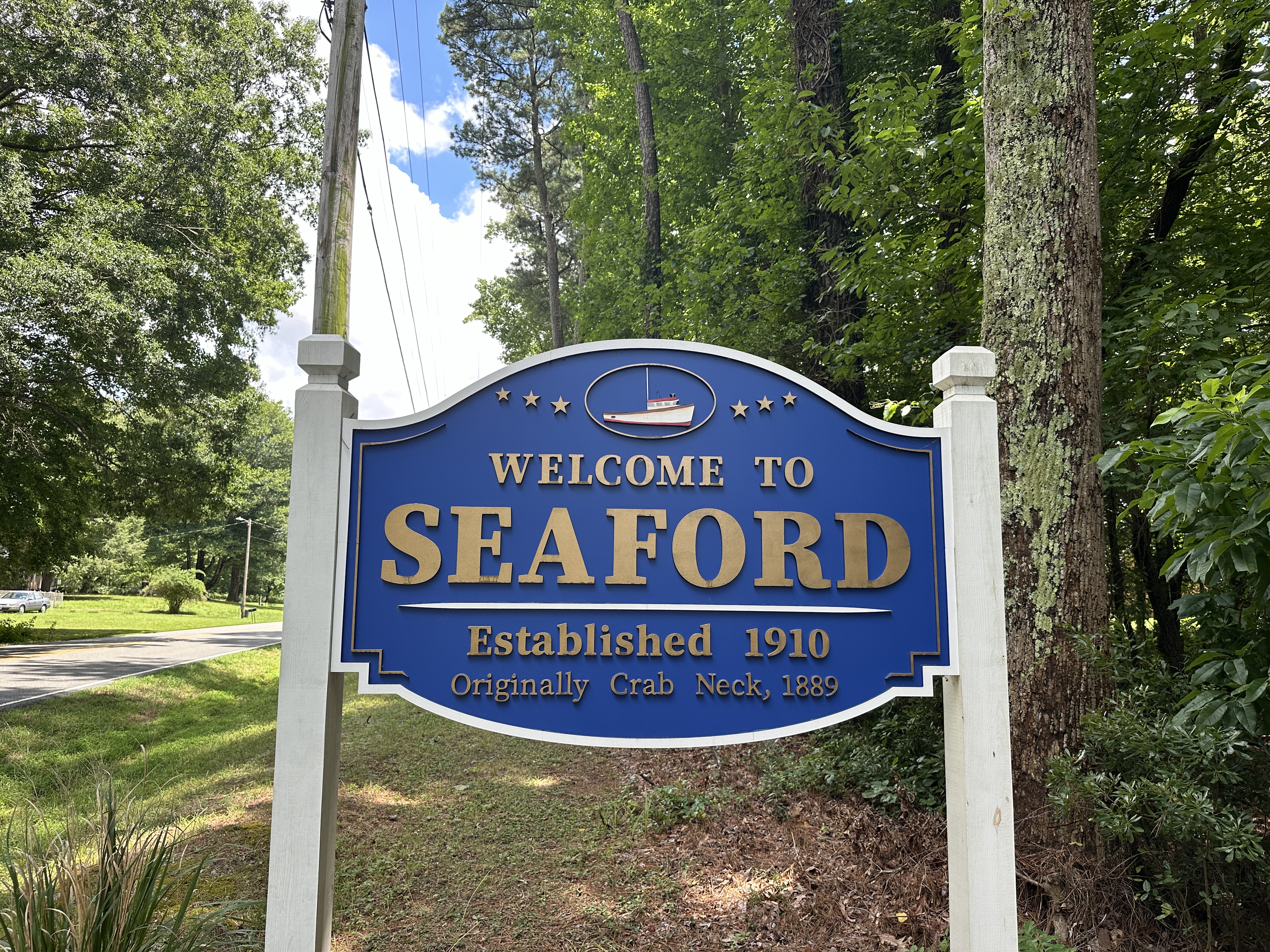
Seaford welcome sign

Seaford is an unincorporated community in York County, Virginia, United States, on the Virginia Peninsula.

== History ==
John Chisman patented 600 acres (2.4 km^{2}) on Crab Neck in 1636 and began the Seaford Settlement. The area was originally called Crab Neck, Crab Rock and Calamar. The Crab Neck post office was established in 1889 and changed its name to Seaford in 1910.
