= 2023 NHRA Camping World Drag Racing Series =

2023 NHRA Camping World Drag Racing Series season
- League: NHRA
- Sport: Drag racing
- Champions: Doug Kalitta (Top Fuel); Matt Hagan (Funny Car); Erica Enders (Pro Stock); Gaige Herrera (Pro Stock Motorcycle)

NHRA seasons
- ← 2022 2024 →

The 2023 NHRA Camping World Drag Racing Series season was announced on September 5, 2022.

It was the 68th season of the National Hot Rod Association's top drag racing competition. The NHRA held 21 Top Fuel and Funny Car events, 18 Pro Stock events, and 15 Pro Stock Motorcycle events.

== Schedule ==
Schedule released September 5, 2022.

2023 NHRA Camping World Drag Racing Series Schedule
Date	Race	Site	TV	Winners			
Date	Race	Site	TV	Top Fuel	Funny Car	Pro Stock	Pro Stock Motorcycle
Mar 9-12	AMALIE Motor Oil NHRA Gatornationals	Gainesville, FL	FS1	Mike Salinas (1)	Matt Hagan (1)	Troy Coughlin Jr. (1)	Gaige Herrera (1)
Mar 24-26	NHRA Arizona Nationals	Chandler, AZ	FS1	Justin Ashley (1)	Robert Hight (1)	Camrie Caruso (1)	N/A
Mar 30 - Apr 2	Lucas Oil Winternationals	Pomona, CA	FS1	Justin Ashley (2)	Matt Hagan (2)	Dallas Glenn (1)	N/A
Apr 14–16	NHRA Four-Wide Nationals ^{4 Lanes}	Las Vegas, NV	FS1	Antron Brown (1)	Matt Hagan (3)	Dallas Glenn (2)	N/A
Apr 28-30	Circle K NHRA Four-Wide Nationals ^{4 Lanes}	Concord, NC	FS1	Austin Prock (1)	Robert Hight (2)	Deric Kramer (1)	Gaige Herrera (2)
May 19–21	Gerber Collision & Glass NHRA Route 66 Nationals presented by PEAK Performance	Elwood, IL	FS1	Clay Millican (1)	Tim Wilkerson (1)	Dallas Glenn (3)	Gaige Herrera (3)
June 3–5	NHRA New England Nationals	Epping, NH (Note: The Final round of the New England Nationals was postponed and held at Bristol due to inclement weather.)	FS1	Justin Ashley (3)	Bob Tasca III (1)	N/A	N/A
Jun 9-11	NHRA Thunder Valley Nationals	Bristol, TN	FS1/FOX	Justin Ashley (4)	Ron Capps (1)	Erica Enders (1)	Steve Johnson (1)
Jun 22–25	Summit Racing Equipment NHRA Nationals	Norwalk, OH	FOX	Leah Pruett (1)	Blake Alexander (1)	Matt Hartford (1)	Hector Arana Jr. (1)
Jul 14-16	Dodge Power Brokers NHRA Mile-High Nationals	Morrison, CO	FOX	Clay Millican (2)	Matt Hagan (4)	Troy Coughlin Jr. (2)	Gaige Herrera (4)
Jul 20-23	Flav-R-Pac NHRA Northwest Nationals	Kent, WA	FOX	Steve Torrence (1)	Tim Wilkerson (2)	N/A	Gaige Herrera (5)
Jul 28–30	DENSO NHRA Sonoma Nationals	Sonoma, CA	FOX	Justin Ashley (5)	J.R. Todd (1)	N/A	Gaige Herrera (6)
Aug 11-13	Menards NHRA Nationals presented by PetArmor	Topeka, KS	FS1	Justin Ashley (6)	Bob Tasca III (2)	Erica Enders (2)	N/A
Aug 17-20	Lucas Oil NHRA Nationals	Brainerd, MN	FOX	Antron Brown (2)	Ron Capps (2)	Dallas Glenn (4)	N/A
Aug 30 - Sep 4	Dodge Power Brokers NHRA U.S. Nationals ^{1.5}	Brownsburg, IN	FS1/FOX	Antron Brown (3)	Ron Capps (3)	Matt Hartford (2)	Matt Smith (1)
Countdown to the Championship
Sep 14-17	Pep Boys NHRA Nationals	Mohnton, PA	FOX/FS1	Doug Kalitta (1)	Robert Hight (3)	Matt Hartford (3)	Matt Smith (2)
Sep 22-24	betway NHRA Carolina Nationals	Concord, NC	FS1	Doug Kalitta (2)	Bob Tasca III (3)	Greg Anderson (1)	Gaige Herrera (7)
Sep 29 - Oct 1	NHRA Midwest Nationals	Madison, IL	FS1	Clay Millican (3)	Matt Hagan (5)	Greg Anderson (2)	Gaige Herrera (8)
Oct 12-15	Texas NHRA FallNationals	Ennis, TX	FS1	Leah Pruett (2)	Matt Hagan (6)	Erica Enders (3)	Gaige Herrera (9)
Oct 26-29	NHRA Nevada Nationals	Las Vegas, NV	FS1/FS2	Mike Salinas (2)	Robert Hight (4)	Erica Enders (4)	Gaige Herrera (10)
Nov 9-12	In-N-Out Burger NHRA Finals ^{1.5}	Pomona, CA	FS1	Doug Kalitta (3)	Chad Green (1)	Aaron Stanfield (1)	Gaige Herrera (11)

=== Additional rules for specially marked races ===
4 Lanes: The Nationals in both Las Vegas and Charlotte in the spring will compete with cars on four lanes.

- All cars will qualify on each lane as all four lanes will be used in qualifying.
- Three rounds with cars using all four lanes.
- In Rounds One and Two, the top two drivers (of four) will advance to the next round.
- The pairings are set as follows:
  - Race One: 1, 8, 9, 16
  - Race Two: 4, 5, 12, 13
  - Race Three: 2, 7, 10, 15
  - Race Four: 3, 6, 11, 14
  - Semifinal One: Top two in Race One and Race Two
  - Semifinal Two: Top two in Race Three and Race Four
  - Finals: Top two in Semifinal One and Semifinal Two
- Lane choice determined by times in previous round. In first round, lane choice determined by fastest times.
- Drivers who advance in Rounds One and Two will receive 20 points for each round advancement.
- In Round Three, the winner of the race will be declared the race winner and will collect 40 points. The runner-up will receive 20 points. Third and fourth place drivers will be credited as semifinal losers.

1.5: The U. S. Nationals and In-N-Out Burger Finals will have their race points increased by 50% . Drivers who qualify but are eliminated in the first round receive 30 points, and each round win is worth 30 points. The top four receive 10, 9, 8, and 7 points, respectively, for qualifying positions, with the 5–6 drivers receiving 6 points, 7–8 drivers receiving 5 points, 9–12 receiving 4 points, and 13–16 receiving 3 points. Also, the top four, not three, drivers after each session receive points for fastest times in each round (4-3-2-1).

MM: Pro Stock Car at this event is a non-championship race with the Mountain Motor formula, where cars can use carburetors or electronic fuel injection, do not have an engine displacement limit, and weighs a minimum of 2,450 pounds, compared to the NHRA Pro Stock formula that features electronic fuel injection, a 500ci (8193cc) engine displacement limit, and 2,350 pounds weight.

== Mission #2Fast2Tasty NHRA Challenge ==
The Mission #2Fast2Tasty NHRA Challenge is a collaboration between NHRA and Mission Foods, introduced in the 2023 NHRA Camping World Drag Racing Series. The challenge spices up Saturday qualifying schedule at regular-season events. Semifinalists from the previous race compete anew, culminating in a final during the last qualifying session. Winners gain a purse, as well as bonus points.

Bonus points are awarded as follows:

- Winner (3)
- Runner-up (2)
- Quickest losing semifinalist (1)

Bonus points earned from the challenge will be added to a driver’s total points at the start of the Countdown to the Championship playoffs.

2023 Mission #2FAST2TASTY Challenge Schedule
Date	Race	Winners			
Date	Race	Top Fuel	Funny Car	Pro Stock	Pro Stock Motorcycle
Feb 25	NHRA Arizona Nationals	Doug Kalitta	Alexis DeJoria	Troy Coughlin Jr.	N/A (Note: Vehicle class did not compete at this event.)
Apr 1	Lucas Oil Winternationals	Justin Ashley	Chad Green	Matt Hartford	N/A
May 20	Gerber Collision & Glass NHRA Route 66 Nationals presented by PEAK Performance	Justin Ashley	Ron Capps	N/A (Note: Pro Stock Car did not participate in the Challenge at Route 66 due to the Pro Stock All-Star Call Out taking place)	Gaige Herrera
Jun 4	NHRA New England Nationals	N/A (Note: Due to weather, the finals were canceled. Clay Millican and Leah Pruett advanced to the finals in Top Fuel, with Millican collecting the biggest share of the bonus purse after making the quickest winning run in the first round of the bonus race. Leah Pruett qualified for the Top Fuel challenge as the second alternate after Chicago semifinalist T.J. Zizzo and quarterfinalist Jacob McNeal opted not to compete in Epping. In Funny Car, Ron Capps and Tim Wilkerson advanced to the finals, with Capps collecting the biggest share of the bonus purse after making the quickest winning run in the first round of the bonus race. No points were awarded in the challenge in Epping.)		N/A	
Jun 10	NHRA Thunder Valley Nationals	N/A (Note: There were no Top Fuel or Funny Car challenges since the Epping races were cancelled. Justin Ashley (TF) and Bob Tasca III (FC) won the first Bristol round and were retroactively given challenge points. In Pro Stock and Pro Stock Motorcycle, the results of the Joliet round were used to determine participants.)		Aaron Stanfield	Gaige Herrera
Jun 24	Summit Racing Equipment NHRA Nationals	Justin Ashley	Ron Capps	Deric Kramer	Angie Smith
Jul 15	Dodge Power Brokers NHRA Mile-High Nationals	Justin Ashley	Matt Hagan	Troy Coughlin Jr.	Matt Smith
Jul 22	Flav-R-Pac NHRA Northwest Nationals	Steve Torrence	Ron Capps	N/A	Gaige Herrera
Jul 29	DENSO NHRA Sonoma Nationals	Steve Torrence	J.R. Todd	N/A	N/A (Note: Pro Stock Motorcycle did not participate in the Challenge at Sonoma due to the Pro Stock Motorcycle All-Star Call Out taking place)
Aug 12	Menards NHRA Nationals presented by PetArmor	Steve Torrence	Matt Hagan	Dallas Glenn	N/A
Aug 19	Lucas Oil NHRA Nationals	Antron Brown	Robert Hight	Erica Enders	N/A
Sep 3	Dodge Power Brokers NHRA U.S. Nationals	Justin Ashley	John Force	Aaron Stanfield	Gaige Herrera
Overall Winners		Justin Ashley	Ron Capps	Aaron Stanfield	Gaige Herrera
