= 2025 NHRA Mission Foods Drag Racing Series =

70th season of NHRA Drag Racing

2025 NHRA Mission Foods Drag Racing Series season

Season
- Races: 19
- Start date: March 9
- End date: November 2

Awards
- Drivers' champion: Doug Kalitta (Top Fuel); Austin Prock (Funny Car); Dallas Glenn (Pro Stock); Richard Gadson (Pro Stock Motorcycle)
- Rookie of the Year: Spencer Hyde (Funny Car)

The 2025 NHRA Mission Foods Drag Racing Series season was the 70th season of the National Hot Rod Association's top drag racing competition.

The season schedule was announced on July 10, 2024. This season featured the 60th anniversary of the NHRA Finals. The NHRA hosted 20 national events, with 19 hosting professional classes, with the NHRA Finals being exclusively for lower-tier sportsman classes due to the weather. Top Fuel and Funny Car competed at 19 national events. Pro Stock and Pro Stock Motorcycle will compete at 17 and 14 events, respectively. There was also All-Star Call Out races, which are based on a format used by the Discovery television program Street Outlaws: No Prep Kings, where the drivers select their opponents in early rounds.

The Arizona Nationals & Winternationals switched spots on the schedule for this particular season outside of that the schedule was unchanged from the 2024 season. The event at Virginia Motorsports Park had a modified to a two-day format with all 3 qualifying sessions taking place on Saturday very similar to the prior season.

The 2025 season was also the first since 1971 to begin a brand new season without John Force behind the wheel of a Funny Car, as he is still recovering from his crash in Virginia in 2024, with Jack Beckman running the PEAK Funny Car full time for the season. Force would later announce his retirement from driving on November 13, 2025, during the NHRA Finals. Tony Schumacher also began the season without a ride, as he joined Rick Ware Racing a few days before the Gatornationals, leaving little time to put a team together for him at the event. Blake Alexander joined Chad Green Motorsports in Funny Car, starting a second team under CGM, to be shared with Hunter Green. Replacing him on Jim Head's team is former Pro Mod driver Spencer Hyde. JCM Racing announced an all-female nitro team made up of Alexis DeJoria and Ida Zetterström in Funny Car and Top Fuel, respectively. Part-time driver Bobby Bode III began the season in DeJoria's former car. In Pro Stock, Greg Stanfield announced a full-time return driving for Elite Motorsports.

== Schedule ==
the schedule released on July 10, 2024, with categories on December 11, 2024.

2025 NHRA Mission Foods Drag Racing Series Schedule
Date	Race	Site	TV	Winners			
Date	Race	Site	TV	Top Fuel	Funny Car	Pro Stock	Pro Stock Motorcycle
March 6–9	Amalie Motor Oil NHRA Gatornationals	Gainesville Raceway; Gainesville, Florida	FS1	Antron Brown (1)	Chad Green (1)	Dallas Glenn (1)	Gaige Herrera (1)
March 21–23	NHRA Arizona Nationals	Firebird Motorsports Park; Chandler, Arizona	FS1	Shawn Langdon (1)	Paul Lee (1)	Greg Anderson (1)	N/A (Note: Vehicle class did not compete at this event.)
March 27–30	Lucas Oil NHRA Winternationals ^{TFCO}	In-N-Out Burger Pomona Dragstrip; Pomona, California	FS1	Clay Millican (1)	Jack Beckman (1)	Greg Anderson (2)	N/A
April 11–13	NHRA Four-Wide Nationals ^{4 Lanes}	Las Vegas Motor Speedway; Las Vegas, Nevada	FS1	Tony Stewart (1)	Austin Prock (1)	Dallas Glenn (2)	N/A
April 25–27	American Rebel Light NHRA 4-Wide Nationals ^{4 Lanes}	zMAX Dragway; Concord, North Carolina	FS1	Shawn Langdon (2)	Austin Prock (2)	Dallas Glenn (3)	Matt Smith (1)
May 16–18	Gerber Collision & Glass Route 66 NHRA Nationals Presented By PEAK	Route 66 Raceway; Joliet, Illinois	FS1	Tony Stewart (2)	Jack Beckman (2)	N/A	Gaige Herrera(2)
May 30–June 1	NHRA New England Nationals	New England Dragway; Epping, New Hampshire	FOX	Brittany Force (1)	J.R Todd (1)	Greg Anderson (3)	N/A
June 6–8	Super Grip NHRA Thunder Valley Nationals	Bristol Dragway; Bristol, Tennessee	FS1	Steve Torrence (1)	Ron Capps (1)	Greg Anderson (4)	Richard Gadson (1)
June 20–22	American Rebel Light Virginia NHRA Nationals	Virginia Motorsports Park; Dinwiddie, Virginia	FOX	Justin Ashley (1) (Note: Shawn Langdon defeated Justin Ashley in the final. Langdon was disqualified for a safety violation when bolts on the containment bell housing inspection cover fell off during the round from not being secured. Per SFI Foundation Specification 6.2.3.1, "A minimum of twelve (12) 8 millimetres (0.31 in) Grade 8 bolts or better, clearly marked, shall secure the cover in place." The car was found to have fewer than twelve such legal bolts attacked to the car.)	Austin Prock (3)	N/A	Gaige Herrera (3)
June 26–29	Summit Racing Equipment NHRA Nationals ^{PSCO}	Summit Motorsports Park; Norwalk, Ohio	FOX	Justin Ashley (2)	Austin Prock (4)	Cory Reed (1)	John Hall (1)
July 18–20	Muckleshoot Casino Resort NHRA Northwest Nationals	Pacific Raceways; Kent, Washington	FOX	Shawn Langdon (3)	Matt Hagan (1)	Dallas Glenn (4)	Gaige Herrera (4)
July 25–27	DENSO NHRA Sonoma Nationals Presented By PowerEdge ^{PSMCO}	Sonoma Raceway; Sonoma, California	FS1	Doug Kalitta (1)	Austin Prock (5)	Greg Stanfield (1)	Richard Gadson (2)
August 14–17	Lucas Oil NHRA Nationals	Brainerd International Raceway; Brainerd, Minnesota	FOX	Doug Kalitta (2)	Austin Prock (6)	Greg Anderson (5)	N/A
August 27–September 1	Cornwell Quality Tools NHRA U.S. Nationals ^{1.5} ^{FCCO}	Lucas Oil Indianapolis Raceway Park; Brownsburg, Indiana	FS1 and FOX	Justin Ashley (3)	Austin Prock (7)	Erica Enders (1)	Gaige Herrera (5)
Countdown to the Championship
September 11–14	NHRA Reading Nationals Presented By Nitro Fish	Maple Grove Raceway Mohnton, Pennsylvania	FS1	Shawn Reed (1)	Cruz Pedregon (1)	Dallas Glenn (5)	John Hall (2)
September 19–21	NHRA 4-Wide Carolina Nationals ^{4 Lanes}	zMAX Dragway Concord, North Carolina	FS1	Justin Ashley (4)	Austin Prock (8)	Dallas Glenn (6)	Richard Gadson (3)
September 26–28	NAPA Auto Parts NHRA Midwest Nationals	World Wide Technology Raceway at Gateway Madison, Illinois	FS1	Doug Kalitta (3)	Matt Hagan (2)	Greg Anderson (6)	Gaige Herrera (6)
October 9–12	Texas NHRA FallNationals	Texas Motorplex Ennis, Texas	FOX	Doug Kalitta (4)	Austin Prock (9)	Dallas Glenn (7)	Richard Gadson (4)
October 30–November 2	Dodge NHRA Nevada Nationals Powered By Direct Connection	Las Vegas Motor Speedway Las Vegas, Nevada	FS1	Brittany Force (2)	Matt Hagan (3)	Dallas Glenn (8)	Gaige Herrera (7)
November 13-16	In-N-Out Burger NHRA Finals ^{1.5} (Note: Only six classes (Comp, Super Stock, Stock, Super Comp, Super Gas, Top Sportsman, Top Dragster) finished. Top Alcohol Dragster and Funny Car abandoned after one round. None of the four professional classes competed because of weather conditions, including rain and dew.)	In-N-Out Burger Pomona Dragstrip Pomona, California	FS1	N/A	N/A	N/A	N/A

=== Schedule Changes ===
- Pomona 1 and Phoenix swapped dates from the 2024 season, making Phoenix the 2nd race of the year and Pomona 1 the third.
- Pomona 2 became a national event exclusively for sportsman cars because of weather.

=== Additional rules for specially marked races ===
4 Lanes: The National events in both Las Vegas (spring only) and Charlotte will compete with cars on four lanes.

- All cars will qualify on each lane as all four lanes will be used in qualifying.
- Three rounds with cars using all four lanes.
- In Rounds One and Two, the top two drivers (of four) will advance to the next round.
- The pairings are set as follows:
  - Race One: 1, 8, 9, 16
  - Race Two: 4, 5, 12, 13
  - Race Three: 2, 7, 10, 15
  - Race Four: 3, 6, 11, 14
  - Semifinal One: Top two in Race One and Race Two
  - Semifinal Two: Top two in Race Three and Race Four
  - Finals: Top two in Semifinal One and Semifinal Two
- Lane choice determined by times in previous round. In first round, lane choice determined by fastest times.
- Drivers who advance in Rounds One and Two will receive 20 points for each round advancement.
- In Round Three, the winner of the race will be declared the race winner and will collect 40 points. The runner-up will receive 20 points. Third and fourth place drivers will be credited as semifinal losers.

1.5: The U.S. Nationals and In-N-Out Burger Finals will have their race points increased by 50% . Drivers who qualify but are eliminated in the first round receive 30 points, and each round win is worth 30 points. The top four receive 10, 9, 8, and 7 points, respectively, for qualifying positions, with the 5–6 drivers receiving 6 points, 7–8 drivers receiving 5 points, 9–12 receiving 4 points, and 13–16 receiving 3 points. Also, the top four, not three, drivers after each session receive points for fastest times in each round (4-3-2-1).

TF/FC/PS/PSM CO: All-Star Call Out competition for that category.

== Mission #2Fast2Tasty NHRA Challenge ==
The Mission #2Fast2Tasty NHRA Challenge is a collaboration between NHRA and Mission Foods, introduced in the 2023 NHRA Camping World Drag Racing Series. The challenge spices up Saturday qualifying schedule at regular-season events. Semifinalists from the previous race compete anew, culminating in a final during the last qualifying session. Winners gain a purse, as well as bonus points. At the U. S. Nationals (Monday finals), the event takes place on Saturday.

Bonus points are awarded as follows:

- Winner (3)
- Runner-up (2)
- Quickest losing semifinalist (1)

Bonus points earned from the challenge will be added to a driver’s total points at the start of the Countdown to the Championship playoffs.

2025 Mission #2FAST2TASTY Challenge Schedule
Date	Race	Winners			
Date	Race	Top Fuel	Funny Car	Pro Stock	Pro Stock Motorcycle
March 22	NHRA Arizona Nationals	Shawn Langdon (1)	Ron Capps (1)	Jeg Coughlin Jr. (1)	N/A (Note: Vehicle class did not compete at this event.)
March 29	Lucas Oil NHRA Winternationals	Shawn Langdon (2)	Jack Beckman (1)	Matt Hartford (1)	N/A
April 12	NHRA Four-Wide Nationals (Las Vegas)	Doug Kalitta (1)	Spencer Hyde (1)	Dallas Glenn (1)	N/A
April 26	American Rebel Light NHRA 4-Wide Nationals (Concord)	Doug Kalitta (2)	Austin Prock (1)	Matt Hartford (2)	Richard Gadson (1)
May 17	Gerber Collision & Glass NHRA Route 66 Nationals Presented By PEAK	Shawn Langdon (3)	Matt Hagan (1)	N/A	Gaige Herrera (1)
May 31	NHRA New England Nationals	Doug Kalitta (3)	Jack Beckman (2)	Matt Hartford (3)	N/A
June 7	Super Grip NHRA Thunder Valley Nationals	Tony Stewart (1)	J.R. Todd (1)	Aaron Stanfield (1)	Gaige Herrera (2)
June 21	American Rebel Light Virginia NHRA Nationals	Steve Torrence (1)	Daniel Wilkerson (1)	N/A	Brayden Davis (1)
June 28	Summit Racing Equipment NHRA Nationals	Doug Kalitta (4)	Daniel Wilkerson (2)	ASCO (Note: Class will not participate in the Challenge at this round because of the class All-Star Call Out taking place)	Gaige Herrera (3)
July 19	Muckleshoot Casino Resort NHRA Northwest Nationals	Shawn Langdon (4)	Austin Prock (2)	Dallas Glenn (2)	John Hall (1)
July 26	DENSO NHRA Sonoma Nationals Presented By PowerEdge	Brittany Force (1)	Ron Capps (2)	Dallas Glenn (3)	ASCO
August 16	Lucas Oil NHRA Nationals	Shawn Langdon(5)	Jack Beckman(3)	Greg Anderson(1)	N/A
August 30	Cornwell Quality Tools NHRA U.S. Nationals	Doug Kalitta (5)	J.R. Todd (2)	Greg Anderson (2)	Richard Gadson (2)
Overall Winners		Doug Kalitta	Matt Hagan	Greg Anderson	Gaige Herrera
