= 2024 NHRA Mission Foods Drag Racing Series =

2024 NHRA Mission Foods Drag Racing Series season
- League: NHRA
- Sport: Drag racing
- League champions: Antron Brown (Top Fuel); Austin Prock (Funny Car); Greg Anderson (Pro Stock); Gaige Herrera (Pro Stock Motorcycle)

NHRA seasons
- ← 2023 2025 →

The 2024 NHRA Mission Foods Drag Racing Series season was announced on August 31, 2023.

It was the 69th season of the National Hot Rod Association's top drag racing competition. The NHRA will have 20 Top Fuel, Funny Car and Pro Stock events, marking the first time since 2018 that Pro Stock car will compete the full season. Pro Stock Motorcycle is competing in 15 events this season. There will be All-Star Call Out races, which are based on a format used by the Discovery television program Street Outlaws: No Prep Kings, where the drivers select their opponents in early rounds.

On October 25, 2023, Camping World, which had been the title sponsor of the series since late 2020 in a four-and-a-half-year contract, and the NHRA agreed to relinquish naming rights sponsorship in renewing its NHRA professional category sponsorship while expanding to premier partner status that includes professional and sportsman series sponsorship for the next three seasons through 2026. That allowed the NHRA that day to announce Mexican food producer Gruma, S.A.B. de C.V. will become the new naming rights sponsor of the series. Gruma will promote their Mission Foods brand, which also expands their Mission Foods Challenge to all 14 regular season rounds in 2024, unlike 2023 when the event was not scheduled for the two four-wide rounds.

On November 9, 2023, the NHRA announced Virginia Motorsports Park in Dinwiddie, Virginia will return to the schedule to fill the June unannounced date that replaces Denver on the schedule. Originally planned to be a three-day event, the NHRA announced on April 2, 2024 that the event would be modified to a two-day format with three qualifying sessions taking place on Saturday.

The season was originally scheduled for 21 races with one unannounced date. The unannounced date was anticipated to be held at I-70 Motorsports Park in Odessa, Missouri and would replace the Heartland Nationals event, held at Heartland Motorsports Park in Shawnee County, Kansas, which closed because of land and tax disputes between circuit ownership and the local government. The NHRA announced on March 10, 2024 that the planned Odessa round will not take place in 2024 because the drag strip, which during development was called the new Kansas City International Raceway and later Central Power Raceway, is still under construction. That circuit opened April 11, 2024 for competition.

== Schedule ==
Schedule released August 31, 2023. Last revision March 10, 2024

2024 NHRA Mission Foods Drag Racing Series Schedule
Date	Race	Site	TV	Winners			
Date	Race	Site	TV	Top Fuel	Funny Car	Pro Stock	Pro Stock Motorcycle
Mar 7-10	Amalie Motor Oil NHRA Gatornationals ^{TFCO}	Gainesville Raceway Gainesville, FL	FS1	Shawn Langdon (1)	J.R. Todd (1)	Erica Enders (1)	Gaige Herrera (1)
Mar 21-24	Lucas Oil NHRA Winternationals	In-N-Out Burger Pomona Dragstrip Pomona, CA (Note: The Final round of the Winternationals was postponed and held at Phoenix due to inclement weather.)	FS1	Justin Ashley (1)	John Force (1)	Dallas Glenn (1)	N/A
Apr 5-7	NHRA Arizona Nationals	Wild Horse Pass Motorsports Park Chandler, AZ	FS1	Shawn Langdon (2)	Austin Prock (1)	Greg Anderson (1)	N/A
Apr 12-14	NHRA Four-Wide Nationals ^{4 Lanes}	Las Vegas Motor Speedway Las Vegas, NV	FS1	Doug Kalitta (1)	Bob Tasca III (1)	Jeg Coughlin Jr. (1)	N/A
Apr 26-28	NHRA Four-Wide Nationals ^{4 Lanes}	zMAX Dragway Concord, NC	FS1	Justin Ashley (2)	Matt Hagan (1)	Greg Anderson (2)	Gaige Herrera (2)
May 17–19	Gerber Collision & Glass NHRA Route 66 Nationals presented by PEAK Performance^{PSCO}	Route 66 Raceway Joliet, IL	FS1	Antron Brown (1)	Matt Hagan (2)	Dallas Glenn (2)	Gaige Herrera (3)
May 31 - June 2	NHRA New England Nationals	New England Dragway Epping, NH	FS1	Doug Kalitta (2)	John Force (2)	Troy Coughlin Jr. (1)	N/A
Jun 7-9	Super Grip NHRA Thunder Valley Nationals	Bristol Dragway Bristol, TN	FS1	Tony Schumacher (1)	Austin Prock (2)	Jeg Coughlin Jr. (2)	Gaige Herrera (4)
Jun 22-23	Virginia NHRA Nationals	Virginia Motorsports Park Dinwiddie, VA	FS1	Doug Kalitta (3)	Austin Prock (3)	Aaron Stanfield (1)	Gaige Herrera (5)
Jun 27-30	Summit Racing Equipment NHRA Nationals	Summit Motorsports Park Norwalk, OH	FS1/FOX	Antron Brown (2)	Bob Tasca III (2)	Aaron Stanfield (2)	Gaige Herrera (6)
Jul 19-21	NHRA Northwest Nationals	Pacific Raceways Kent, WA	FOX	Steve Torrence (1)	Austin Prock (4)	Jeg Coughlin Jr. (3)	Chase Van Sant (1)
Jul 26-28	DENSO NHRA Sonoma Nationals ^{PSMCO}	Sonoma Raceway Sonoma, CA	FOX	Antron Brown (3)	Bob Tasca III (3)	Aaron Stanfield (3)	Matt Smith (1)
Aug 15-18	Lucas Oil NHRA Nationals	Brainerd International Raceway Brainerd, MN	FOX	Justin Ashley (3)	Blake Alexander (1)	Dallas Glenn (3)	N/A
Aug 28 - Sep 2	Toyota NHRA U.S. Nationals ^{1.5} ^{FCCO}	Lucas Oil Raceway Brownsburg, IN	FS1/FOX	Clay Millican (1)	Austin Prock (5)	Aaron Stanfield (4)	Gaige Herrera (7)
Countdown to the Championship
Sep 12-15	Pep Boys NHRA Nationals	Maple Grove Raceway Mohnton, PA	FOX	Antron Brown (4)	Austin Prock (6)	Aaron Stanfield (5)	Hector Arana, Jr. (1)
Sep 20-22	NHRA Carolina Nationals	zMAX Dragway Concord, NC	FS1	Antron Brown (5)	Austin Prock (7)	Dallas Glenn (4)	Matt Smith (2)
Sep 27-29	NHRA Midwest Nationals	World Wide Technology Raceway at Gateway Madison, IL	FS1	Tony Schumacher (2)	Jack Beckman (1)	Dallas Glenn(5)	Gaige Herrera(8)
Oct 10-13	Texas NHRA FallNationals	Texas Motorplex Ennis, TX	FS1	Justin Ashley (4)	Matt Hagan (3)	Jeg Coughlin Jr. (4)	Gaige Herrera (9)
Oct 31 - Nov 3	Ford Performance NHRA Nationals	Las Vegas Motor Speedway Las Vegas, NV	FS1	Brittany Force (1)	Austin Prock (8)	Aaron Stanfield (6)	Gaige Herrera (10)
Nov 14-17	In-N-Out Burger NHRA Finals ^{1.5}	In-N-Out Burger Pomona Dragstrip Pomona, CA	FS1	Antron Brown (6)	Jack Beckman (2)	Greg Anderson (3)	Matt Smith (3)

=== Additional rules for specially marked races ===
4 Lanes: The Nationals in both Las Vegas and Charlotte in the spring will compete with cars on four lanes.

- All cars will qualify on each lane as all four lanes will be used in qualifying.
- Three rounds with cars using all four lanes.
- In Rounds One and Two, the top two drivers (of four) will advance to the next round.
- The pairings are set as follows:
  - Race One: 1, 8, 9, 16
  - Race Two: 4, 5, 12, 13
  - Race Three: 2, 7, 10, 15
  - Race Four: 3, 6, 11, 14
  - Semifinal One: Top two in Race One and Race Two
  - Semifinal Two: Top two in Race Three and Race Four
  - Finals: Top two in Semifinal One and Semifinal Two
- Lane choice determined by times in previous round. In first round, lane choice determined by fastest times.
- Drivers who advance in Rounds One and Two will receive 20 points for each round advancement.
- In Round Three, the winner of the race will be declared the race winner and will collect 40 points. The runner-up will receive 20 points. Third and fourth place drivers will be credited as semifinal losers.

1.5: The U. S. Nationals and In-N-Out Burger Finals will have their race points increased by 50% . Drivers who qualify but are eliminated in the first round receive 30 points, and each round win is worth 30 points. The top four receive 10, 9, 8, and 7 points, respectively, for qualifying positions, with the 5–6 drivers receiving 6 points, 7–8 drivers receiving 5 points, 9–12 receiving 4 points, and 13–16 receiving 3 points. Also, the top four, not three, drivers after each session receive points for fastest times in each round (4-3-2-1).

TF/FC/PS/PSM CO: All-Star Call Out competition for that category.

== Mission #2Fast2Tasty NHRA Challenge ==
The Mission #2Fast2Tasty NHRA Challenge is a collaboration between NHRA and Mission Foods, introduced in the 2023 NHRA Camping World Drag Racing Series. The challenge spices up Saturday qualifying schedule at regular-season events. Semifinalists from the previous race compete anew, culminating in a final during the last qualifying session. Winners gain a purse, as well as bonus points.

Bonus points are awarded as follows:

- Winner (3)
- Runner-up (2)
- Quickest losing semifinalist (1)

Bonus points earned from the challenge will be added to a driver’s total points at the start of the Countdown to the Championship playoffs.

2024 Mission #2FAST2TASTY Challenge Schedule
Date	Race	Winners			
Date	Race	Top Fuel	Funny Car	Pro Stock	Pro Stock Motorcycle
Mar 23	Lucas Oil NHRA Winternationals	N/A (Note: Only one round of the challenge was completed in Pomona due to weather. The semifinal winners will share the final round purse in each category, with no bonus championship points being awarded. In Top Fuel, Shawn Langdon and Steve Torrence advanced to the final, while J.R. Todd and Austin Prock both won their matchups in Funny Car. The Pro Stock winners were Erica Enders and Dallas Glenn.)			N/A (Note: Vehicle class did not compete at this event.)
Apr 6	NHRA Arizona Nationals	Tony Schumacher (1)	J.R. Todd (1)	Erica Enders (1)	N/A
Apr 13	NHRA Four-Wide Nationals (Las Vegas)	Antron Brown (1)	Austin Prock (1)	Jeg Coughlin Jr. (1)	N/A
Apr 27	NHRA Four-Wide Nationals (Concord)	Justin Ashley (1)	Bob Tasca (1)	Erica Enders (2)	Gaige Herrera (1)
May 18	Gerber Collision & Glass NHRA Route 66 Nationals presented by PEAK Performance	Justin Ashley (2)	J.R. Todd (2)	N/A (Note: Pro Stock Car will not participate in the Challenge at Route 66 due to the Pro Stock All-Star Call Out taking place)	Gaige Herrera (2)
Jun 1	NHRA New England Nationals	Steve Torrence (1)	John Force (1)	Dallas Glenn (1)	N/A
Jun 8	Super Grip NHRA Thunder Valley Nationals	Clay Millican (1)	Austin Prock (2)	Erica Enders (3)	Matt Smith (1)
Jun 22	Virginia NHRA Nationals	Brittany Force (1)	Austin Prock (3)	Greg Anderson (1)	Matt Smith (2)
Jun 29	Summit Racing Equipment NHRA Nationals	Doug Kalitta (1)	Austin Prock (4)	Greg Anderson (2)	Richard Gadson (1)
Jul 20	NHRA Northwest Nationals	Justin Ashley (3)	Austin Prock (5)	Aaron Stanfield (1)	Gaige Herrera (3)
Jul 27	DENSO NHRA Sonoma Nationals	Shawn Langdon (1)	Austin Prock (6)	Jeg Coughlin Jr. (2)	N/A (Note: Pro Stock Motorcycle will not participate in the Challenge at Sonoma due to the Pro Stock Motorcycle All-Star Call Out taking place)
Aug 17	Lucas Oil NHRA Nationals	Antron Brown (2)	Austin Prock (7)	Greg Anderson (3)	N/A
Sep 1	Toyota NHRA U.S. Nationals	Justin Ashley (4)	J.R. Todd (3)	Dallas Glenn (2)	John Hall (1)
Overall Winners		Justin Ashley	Austin Prock	Erica Enders	Gaige Herrera
