= 2022 NHRA SpringNationals =

Drag racing event in Baytown, Texas, USA

National Hot Rod Association
- Venue: Houston Raceway Park
- Location: Baytown, Texas

The 2022 NHRA SpringNationals were a National Hot Rod Association (NHRA) drag racing event, held at Houston Raceway Park in Baytown, Texas on April 24, 2022. Brittany Force took the victory in Top Fuel, while Matt Hagan won in Funny Car, and Erica Enders won in Pro Stock.

== Results ==
=== Top Fuel ===
First round
1 | Steve Torrence | 3.711-325.92
16 | Buddy Hull | 4.041-234.53
8 | Tony Schumacher | 4.860-170.34
9 | Mike Salinas | 4.192-297.42
4 | Justin Ashley | 3.740-329.26
13 | Doug Foley | 5.078-139.65
5 | Austin Prock | 3.743-328.70
12 | Alex Laughlin | 5.125-146.19
2 | Brittany Force | 3.740-329.42
15 | Josh Hart | 4.925-146.65
7 | Leah Pruett | 4.973-201.04
10 | Shawn Langdon | 4.774-197.48
3 | Doug Kalitta | 3.772-323.89
14 | Billy Torrence | 3.726-319.07
6 | Antron Brown | 5.439-136.12
11 | Clay Millican | 3.754-321.42

Quarter-finals
1 | Steve Torrence | 3.744-327.90
9 | Mike Salinas | 0.000-0.00
4 | Justin Ashley | 3.792-326.79
5 | Austin Prock | 3.803-319.14
2 | Brittany Force | 3.773-330.47
10 | Shawn Langdon | 5.589-128.73
3 | Billy Torrence | 3.799-322.19
11 | Clay Millican | 0.000-0.00

Semi-finals
1 | Steve Torrence | 3.778-323.43
4 | Justin Ashley | 3.760-327.51
2 | Brittany Force | 3.848-317.19
14 | Billy Torrence | 3.924-310.77

Final
4 | Justin Ashley | 3.763-329.58
2 | Brittany Force | 3.767-321.42

=== Funny Car ===
First round
1 | Ron Capps | 4.004-281.36
8 | Matt Hagan | 3.954-325.77
9 | John Force | 4.010-328.06
4 | Bob Tasca III | 5.475-132.37
13 | J. R. Todd | 4.008-322.65
5 | Tim Wilkerson | 5.190-152.33
12 | Jim Campbell | 4.026-311.05
2 | Robert Hight | 3.937-324.05
15 | Terry Haddock | 4.078-287.05
7 | Blake Alexander | 4.341-224.62
10 | Chad Green | 3.987-314.24
3 | Cruz Pedregon | 3.925-319.67
14 | Paul Lee | 3.979-323.43
6 | Alexis DeJoria | 99.999-126.13
11 | Bobby Bode | 3.957-314.68

Quarter-finals
1 | Ron Capps | 8.017-95.44
8 | Matt Hagan | 3.933-326.87
13 | J. R. Todd | 4.004-322.19
12 | Jim Campbell | 4.074-311.34
2 | Robert Hight | 4.240-227.04
10 | Chad Green | 4.090-267.16
3 | Cruz Pedregon | 4.030-318.69
11 | Bobby Bode | 3.991-315.05

Semi-finals
8 | Matt Hagan | 3.937-323.97
4 | J. R. Todd | 10.851-81.82
10 | Chad Green | 4.160-305.29
11 | Bobby Bode | 4.034-308.35

Final
8 | Matt Hagan | 3.982-326.63
11 | Bobby Bode | 4.046-282.95

=== Pro Stock ===
Round of 16
1 | Camrie Caruso | 6.457-213.47
16 | Fernando Cuadra | 6.621-208.17
8 | Mason McGaha* | 6.609-208.33
9 | Bo Butner | 9.917-96.07
4 | Greg Anderson | 6.585-209.07
13 | Fernando Cuadra Jr. | 18.604-51.06
5 | Deric Kramer | 6.616-208.88
12 | Rodger Brogdon | 6.595-207.72
2 | Erica Enders | 6.578-209.95
15 | Cristian Cuadra | 6.587-208.81
7 | Dallas Glenn | 0.000-0.00
10 | Matt Hartford | 6.607-209.23
3 | Aaron Stanfield | 13.118-66.19
14 | Chris McGaha | 6.625-208.78
6 | Kyle Koretsky | 6.628-208.23
11 | Kenny Delco | 6.619-209.17

Quarterfinals
1 | Camrie Caruso | 6.624-208.81
9 | Bo Butner | 9.771-93.61
4 | Greg Anderson | 6.578-208.84
12 | Rodger Brogdon | 6.619-207.66
2 | Erica Enders | 6.598-209.23
10 | Matt Hartford | 6.587-209.56
14 | Chris McGaha | 19.274-41.97
6 | Kyle Koretsky | 6.664-208.71

Semifinals
1 | Camrie Caruso | 6.607-208.84
4 | Greg Anderson | 6.578-208.62
2 | Erica Enders | 6.596-209.56
6 | Kyle Koretsky | 6.636-209.17

Finals
1 | Camrie Caruso | 6.624-209.26
2 | Erica Enders | 6.568-210.24

- McGaha had the faster time, but had a red-light start

== Notes ==
| Previous event: 2022 NHRA Four-Wide Nationals | NHRA Camping World Drag Racing Series; 2022 season | Next event: 2022 Circle K NHRA Four-Wide Nationals |
