= 2022 NHRA Winternationals =

Drag racing event in Pomona, California, USA

National Hot Rod Association
- Venue: Auto Club Raceway
- Location: Pomona, California

The 2022 NHRA Winternationals (known as the Lucas Oil Winternationals for sponsorship reasons) were a National Hot Rod Association (NHRA) drag racing event, held at Auto Club Raceway in Pomona, California on February 20, 2022.

== Results ==
=== Top Fuel ===
First round
1	Brittany Force	3.699-325.14
16	Ron August Jr.	3.909-319.07
8	Shawn Langdon	3.920-300.20
9	Josh Hart	3.740-327.82
4	Austin Prock	3.725-333.08
13	Clay Millican	4.350-170.08
5	Doug Kalitta	3.730-327.11
12	Tony Schumacher	3.726-324.28
2	Justin Ashley	3.699-330.39
15	Jim Maroney	4.056-234.09
7	Leah Pruett	3.748-328.86
10	Antron Brown	3.724-327.66
3	Mike Salinas	3.718-325.45
14	Buddy Hull	3.966-269.24
6	Steve Torrence	3.724-328.06
11	Doug Foley	6.629-100.66

Quarterfinals
1	Brittany Force	3.726-322.27
9	Josh Hart	3.728-329.91
4	Austin Prock	3.780-329.10
12	Tony Schumacher	8.516-74.03
2	Justin Ashley	3.692-333.33
10	Antron Brown	3.742-326.00
3	Mike Salinas	10.541-76.35
6	Steve Torrence	3.718-326.08

Semifinals
1	Brittany Force	3.700-328.06
4	Austin Prock	3.687-331.36
2	Justin Ashley	3.702-329.42
6	Steve Torrence	3.731-326.00

Final
4	Austin Prock	3.713-333.00
2	Justin Ashley	3.694-314.53

=== Funny Car ===
First round
1	Ron Capps	3.920-329.75
16	John Force	10.412-76.53
8	J. R. Todd	3.957-325.22
9	Bobby Bode	4.039-290.94
4	Cruz Pedregon	3.954-323.43
13	Terry Haddock	6.011-120.36
5	Alexis DeJoria	3.917-327.35
12	Jim Campbell	4.093-297.02
2	Robert Hight	3.890-328.86
15	Jason Rupert	3.890-328.86
7	Tim Wilkerson	3.890-328.86
10	Tony Jurado	5.416-136.33
3	Matt Hagan	4.071-260.31
14	Chad Green	4.124-282.13
6	Bob Tasca III	4.268-215.10
11	Jeff Arend	5.038-154.74

Quarterfinals
1	Ron Capps	3.890-324.05
8	J. R. Todd	4.234-220.58
4	Cruz Pedregon	3.962-323.66
5	Alexis DeJoria	3.981-323.50
2	Robert Hight	3.893-331.20
10	Tony Jurado	8.647-84.98
3	Matt Hagan	3.885-328.94
6	Bob Tasca III	3.984-325.77

Semifinals
1	Ron Capps	3.881-331.28
4	Cruz Pedregon	3.881-331.28
2	Robert Hight	3.861-332.10
3	Matt Hagan	4.026-317.64

Final
1	Ron Capps	3.882-333.82
2	Robert Hight	3.861-329.58

=== Pro Stock ===
Round of 16
1	Erica Enders	6.558-210.05
16	Cristian Cuadra	6.581-209.92
8	Dallas Glenn	6.577-208.52
9	Chris McGaha	6.565-209.33
4	Greg Anderson	6.531-208.81
13	Mason McGaha	6.602-209.56
5	Deric Kramer	6.579-209.65
12	John Cerbone	6.716-181.57
2	Aaron Stanfield	6.536-209.49
15	Troy Coughlin Jr.	6.569-209.69
7	Camrie Caruso	6.988-148.59
10	Roger Brogdon	6.627-208.23
3	Kyle Koretsky
14	Fernando Cuadra Jr.	6.607-208.23
6	Bo Butner	6.576-209.30
11	Matt Hartford	6.576-207.98

Quarterfinals
1	Erica Enders	6.565-209.72
8	Dallas Glenn	6.570-207.66
4	Greg Anderson	6.561-207.27
5	Deric Kramer	6.595-208.97
2	Aaron Stanfield	6.561-209.07
10	Roger Brogdon	6.590-208.23
14	Fernando Cuadra Jr.	6.626-207.27
6	Bo Butner	12.430-71.21

Semifinals
1	Erica Enders	6.569-209.43
4	Greg Anderson	.797-171.14
2	Aaron Stanfield	6.567-208.71
14	Fernando Cuadra Jr.	6.631-207.78

Finals
1	Erica Enders	6.559-210.31
2	Aaron Stanfield	13.250-67.26

== Notes ==
Previous event: Auto Club NHRA Finals	NHRA Camping World Drag Racing Series; 2022 season	Next event: 2022 NHRA Arizona Nationals
