= 2022 NHRA Gatornationals =

Drag racing event in Gainesville, Florida, USA

National Hot Rod Association
- Venue: Gainesville Raceway
- Location: Gainesville, Florida

The 2022 NHRA Gatornationals also known as the Amalie Motor Oil Gatornationals for sponsorship reasons were a National Hot Rod Association (NHRA) drag racing event, held at Gainesville Raceway in Gainesville, Florida on March 14, 2022.

== Results ==
=== Top Fuel ===
First round
1	Tripp Tatum	3.677-329.58
16	Lex Joon	6.591-102.44
8	Austin Prock	5.179-129.02
9	Billy Torrence	4.02-303.23
4	Mike Salinas	3.706-330.47
13	Krista Baldwin	5.312-126.99
5	Doug Kalitta	3.708-330.8
12	Alex Laughlin	7.98-82.78
2	Brittany Force	8.317-78.33
15	Clay Millican	3.722-326.24
7	Spencer Massey	4.253-187.47
10	Doug Foley	3.762-311.41
3	Steve Torrence	3.696-327.43
14	Tony Schumacher	3.735-313.29
6	Justin Ashley	3.687-331.45
11	Josh Hart	3.759-305.42

Quarterfinals
1	Tripp Tatum	3.727-326.95
9	Billy Torrence	3.748-326.24
4	Mike Salinas	3.698-331.45
5	Doug Kalitta	3.701-330.47
15	Clay Millican	5.052-135.88
10	Doug Foley	3.809-313.51
3	Steve Torrence	703-327.19
6	Justin Ashley	3.683-331.61

Semifinals
1	Tripp Tatum	3.709-327.82
4	Mike Salinas	10.755-72.44
10	Doug Foley	3.774-313.15
6	Justin Ashley	9.643-78.92

Final
1	Tripp Tatum	3.7-330.31
10	Doug Foley	3.806-307.37

=== Funny Car ===
First round
1	Robert Hight	8.457-82.92
8	Chad Green	3.953-323.58
9	Paul Lee	4.492-195.62
4	Matt Hagan	5.266-258.57
13	Dave Richards	9.057-83.17
5	Alexis DeJoria	99.999-0
12	Terry Haddock	4.094-290.19
2	Tim Wilkerson	6.927-126.99
15	John Force	4.332-289.01
7	Bob Tasca III	8.552-75.02
10	Ron Capps	3.864-336.23
3	Cruz Pedregon	3.914-326.95
14	Jim Campbell	4.124-261.02
6	Blake Alexander	3.966-321.81
11	J. R. Todd	10.93-81.58

Quarterfinals
1	Robert Hight	6.631-102.17
8	Chad Green	3.987-320.36
4	Matt Hagan	4.021-315.42
12	Terry Haddock	99.999-0
15	John Force	4.096-324.59
10	Ron Capps	3.913-327.9
3	Cruz Pedregon	5.771-124.96
6	Blake Alexander	3.927-325.14

Semifinals
8	Chad Green	4.011-288.33
4	Matt Hagan	3.894-332.84
10	Ron Capps	9.299-80.52
6	Blake Alexander	3.938-322.96

Final
4	Matt Hagan	3.91-330.96
6	Blake Alexander	9.561-80.15

=== Pro Stock ===
Round of 16
1	Aaron Stanfield	6.457-213.47
16	Stefan Ernryd	6.607-207.46
8	Dallas Glenn	6.478-210.05
9	Troy Coughlin Jr.	99.999-0
4	Roger Brogdon	6.515-211.86
13	Fernando Cuadra Jr.	6.519-210.21
5	Deric Kramer	6.513-211.73
12	Matt Hartford	6.511-212.33
2	Kyle Koretsky	6.486-212.26
15	Fernando Cuadra	6.524-211.46
7	Camrie Caruso	6.491-213.1
10	Cristian Cuadra	12.74-54.58
3	Erica Enders	6.45-213.57
14	Bo Butner	6.513-212.33
6	Greg Anderson	6.492-211.73
11	Mason McGaha	6.521-211.49

Quarterfinals
1	Aaron Stanfield	6.504-213.43
8	Dallas Glenn	6.506-210.73
4	Roger Brogdon	6.515-210.83
12	Matt Hartford	6.515-211.96
2	Kyle Koretsky	6.491-212.23
7	Camrie Caruso	6.548-211.83
14	Bo Butner	6.622-210.54
11	Mason McGaha

Semifinals
8	Dallas Glenn	6.502-210.64
4	Roger Brogdon	6.576-210.73
2	Kyle Kortesky	6.498-212.46
11	Mason McGaha	6.539-211.49

Finals
8	Dallas Glenn	6.486-210.21
2	Kyle Koretsky	6.513-211.46

== Notes ==
Previous event: 2022 NHRA Arizona Nationals	NHRA Camping World Drag Racing Series; 2022 season	Next event: 2022 NHRA Four-Wide Nationals
