= 2022 NHRA Arizona Nationals =

National Hot Rod Association
- Venue: Wild Horse Pass Motorsports Park
- Location: Chandler, Arizona

The 2022 NHRA Arizona Nationals were a National Hot Rod Association (NHRA) drag racing event, held at Wild Horse Pass Motorsports Park in Chandler, Arizona on February 27, 2022.

== Results ==
=== Top Fuel ===
First round
1	Doug Kalitta	5.606-182.01
16	Rob Passey	4.318-263.62
8	Josh Hart	3.705-332.10
9	Leah Pruett	3.699-330.07
4	Tripp Tatum	5.289-115.87
13	Clay Millican	3.768-320.28
5	Justin Ashley	4.026-303.57
12	Tony Schumacher	3.892-263.41
2	Mike Salinas	3.671-331.12
15	Jim Maroney	3.977-257.48
7	Shawn Langdon	3.699-330.47
10	Antron Brown	3.742-321.42
3	Steve Torrence	3.686-328.14
14	Doug Foley	12.043-75.60
6	Brittany Force	3.671-333.49
11	Austin Prock	4.105-248.02

Quarterfinals
16	Rob Passey	3.726-322.27
8	Josh Hart	3.787-319.14
13	Clay Millican	3.752-325.85
12	Tony Schumacher	4.993-138.83
2	Mike Salinas	3.692-330.55
7	Shawn Langdon	3.726-328.54
3	Steve Torrence	3.710-325.92
6	Brittany Force	3.709-330.31

Semifinals
8	Josh Hart	3.739-329.02
13	Clay Millican	3.693-330.15
2	Mike Salinas	3.693-322.19
3	Steve Torrence	5.981-121.76

Final
13	Clay Millican	3.769-322.73
2	Mike Salinas	3.751-318.24

=== Funny Car ===
First round
1	Matt Hagan	3.850-332.26
16	Terry Haddock	4.063-277.43
8	J. R. Todd	4.303-285.41
9	Alexis DeJoria	3.944-324.59
4	Tim Wilkerson	3.870-328.30
13	Bobby Bode	5.051-150.97
5	Cruz Pedregon	4.310-213.74
12	Jeff Diehl	6.087-116.66
2	Robert Hight	3.864-329.42
15	Paul Lee	9.484-65.48
7	Bob Tasca III	3.915-327.51
10	Chad Green	3.946-320.81
3	John Force	4.250-211.93
14	Jeff Arend	5.950-116.09
6	Ron Capps	3.849-331.20
11	Ron Campbell	4.029-311.20

Quarterfinals
1	Matt Hagan	3.864-329.91
9	Alexis DeJoria	3.941-324.44
4	Tim Wilkerson	3.856-331.45
5	Cruz Pedregon	3.905-326.71
2	Robert Hight	3.855-330.55
7	Bob Tasca III	3.922-332.84
3	John Force	3.902-329.42
6	Ron Capps	3.869-327.74

Semifinals
1	Matt Hagan	3.875-332.18
4	Tim Wilkerson	3.875-332.18
2	Robert Hight	3.847-326.63
3	John Force	7.231-86.59

Final
1	Matt Hagan	4.045-267.00
2	Robert Hight	3.837-330.39

=== Pro Stock ===
Round of 16
1	Kyle Koretsky	6.528-210.24
16	John Cerbone	6.560-209.56
8	Camrie Caruso	6.538-210.08
9	Cristian Cuadra	6.559-209.95
4	Troy Coughlin Jr.	6.525-210.97
13	Matt Hartford	6.564-208.55
5	Deric Kramer	6.537-210.18
12	Bo Butner	6.571-209.01
2	Aaron Stanfield	6.503-211.23
15	Alan Prusiensky	8.426-114.27
7	Greg Anderson	33.781-186.74
10	Dallas Glenn	6.545-208.62
3	Erica Enders	6.544-210.73
14	Roger Brogdon	6.549-208.49
6	Chris McGaha	6.555-209.10
11	Mason McGaha	6.547-208.81

Quarterfinals
1	Kyle Koretsky	6.555-210.24
8	Camrie Caruso	6.566-209.98
4	Troy Coughlin Jr.	6.558-210.01
5	Deric Kramer	6.557-209.26
2	Aaron Stanfield	6.534-210.83
7	Greg Anderson	6.537-209.33
3	Erica Enders	6.570-209.72
11	Mason McGaha	12.430-71.21

Semifinals
1	Kyle Koretsky	6.561-209.46
4	Troy Coughlin Jr.	6.575-210.18
2	Aaron Stanfield	6.538-210.21
11	Mason McGaha	10.278-88.10

Finals
4	Troy Coughlin Jr.	6.539-210.24
2	Aaron Stanfield	6.526-210.50

== Notes ==
Previous event: 2022 NHRA Winternationals	NHRA Camping World Drag Racing Series; 2022 season	Next event: 2022 NHRA Gatornationals
