= European Drag Racing Championship =

European drag racing competition series

The European Drag Racing Championship is a combination of four Drag Racing categories that have competed in six events since 1996. The European Drag Racing Season is held from May to September in four countries; UK, Sweden, Finland and Germany. Each drag race category pairs two drivers that compete against each other and the winner is the racer with the lowest reaction time and elapsed time over a designated destination. The drivers are adjudicated points for their performance at each stage which are tallied for a given season.

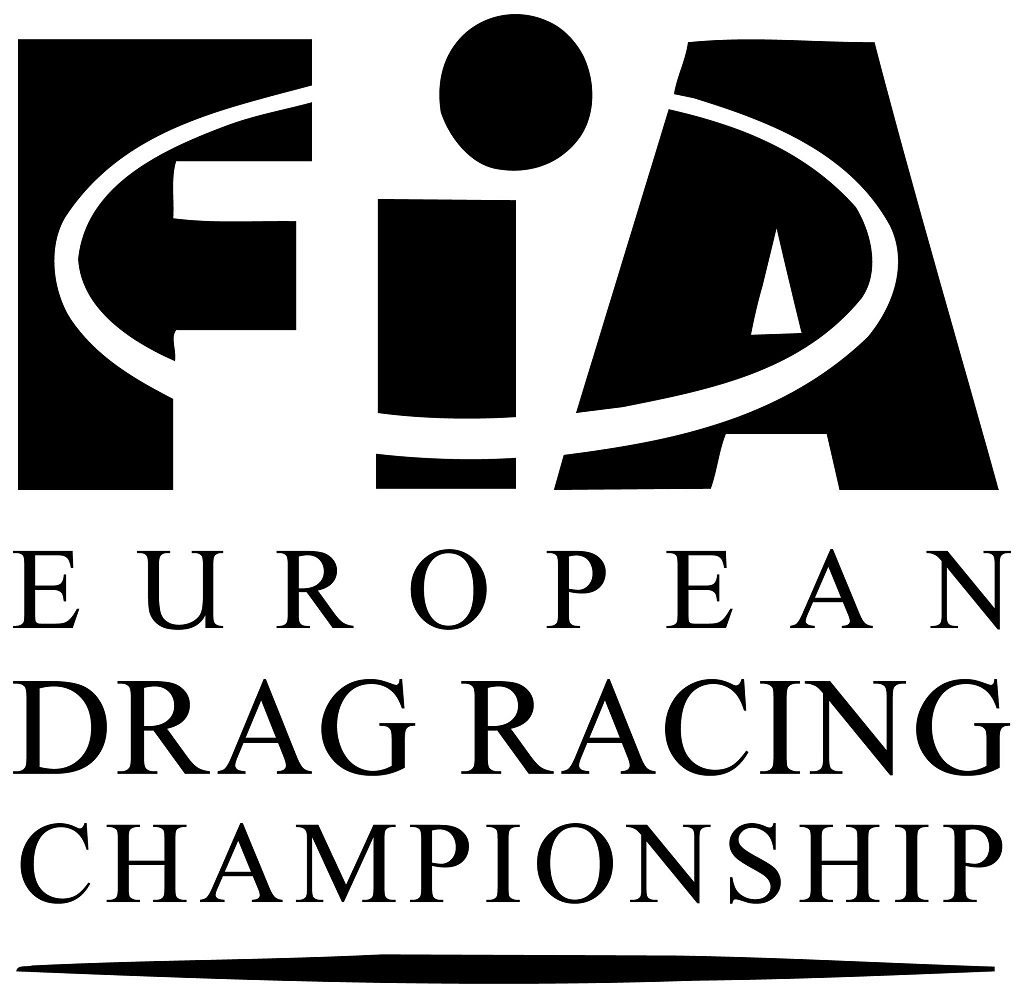
FIA European Drag Racing Championship logo

== History ==
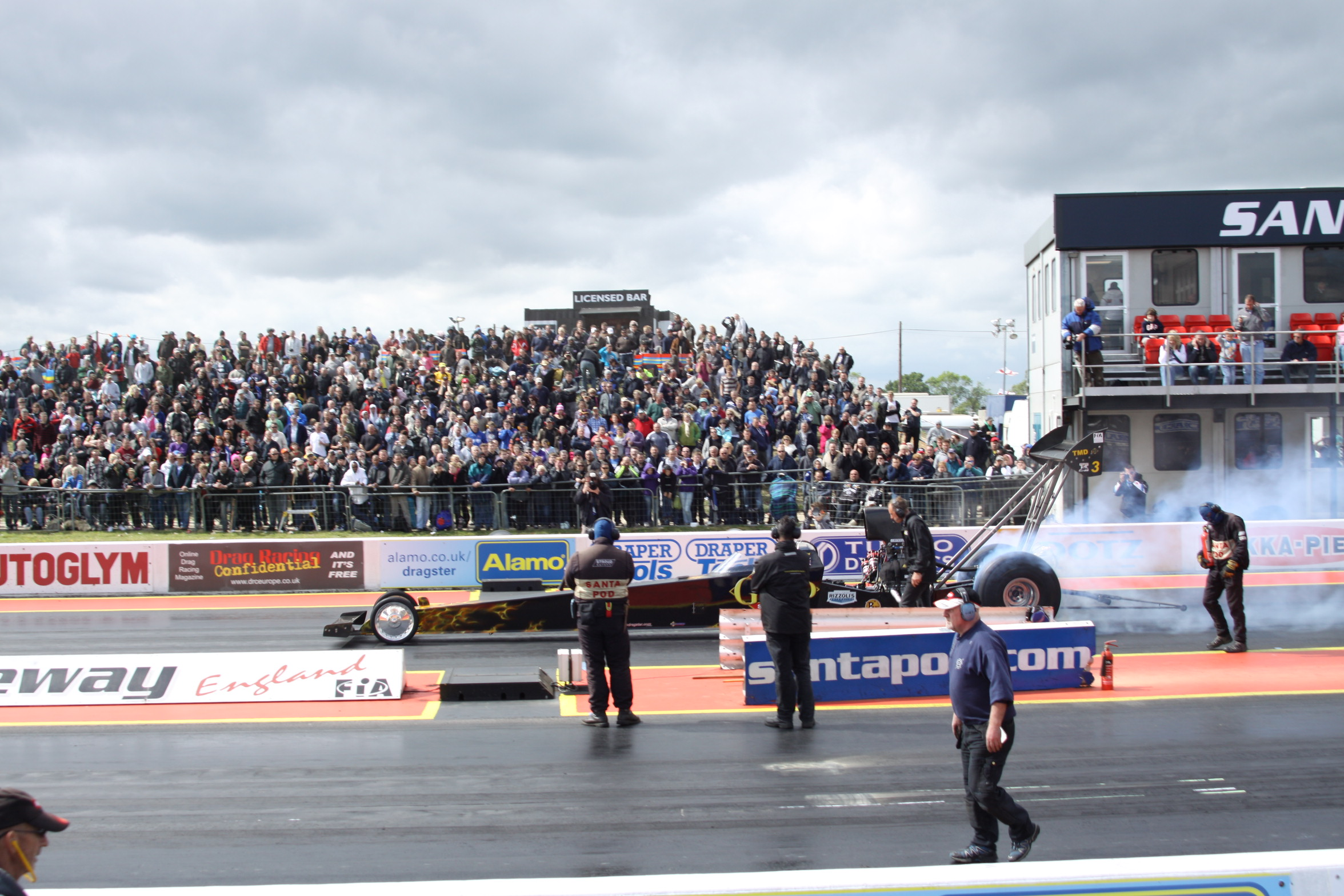
European Drag Racing Championship at Santa Pod Raceway

=== Champions ===
Prior to 2006 the Pro Mod Champion was determined by the winner of the Nordic Drag Racing Series (NDRS), which is part of the Swedish Drag Racing Board.

European Drag Racing Championship Champions
Year	Top Fuel Dragster	Top Methanol	Pro Stock Car	Pro Modified
2025	Susanne Callin (Sweden)	Sandro Bellio (Belgium)	Robin Norén (Sweden)	Jere Rantaniemi (Finland)
2024	Jndia Erbacher (Switzerland)	Jonny Lagg (Sweden)	Jimmy Ålund (Sweden)	Jere Rantaniemi (Finland)
2023	Ida Zetterström (Sweden)	Linn Floysvik (Norway)	Michael Malmgren (Sweden)	Jan Ericsson (Sweden)
2022	Antti Horto (Finland)	Sandro Bellio (Belgium)	Jimmy Ålund (Sweden)	Jan Ericsson (Sweden)
2019	Anita Mäkelä (Finland)	Sandro Bellio (Belgium)	Jimmy Ålund (Sweden)	Jan Ericsson (Sweden)
2018	Anita Mäkelä (Finland)	Dennis Habermann (Germany)	Bengt Ljungdahl (Sweden)	Jimmy Ålund (Sweden)
2017	Duncan Micallef (Malta)	Timo Habermann (Germany)	Bengt Ljungdahl (Sweden)	Michael Gullqvist (Sweden)
2016	Anita Mäkelä (Finland)	Jonny Lagg (Sweden) (D); Johnny Oksa (Finland) (F)	Jimmy Ålund (Sweden)	Michael Gullqvist (Sweden)
2015	Micke Kågered (Sweden)	Dennis Habermann (Germany) (D); Leif Andreasson (Sweden) (F)	Thomas Lindström (Sweden)	Michael Gullqvist (Sweden)
2014	Micke Kågered (Sweden)	Chris Polidano (Malta) (D); Johan Lindberg (Sweden) (F)	Jimmy Ålund (Sweden)	Mattias Wulcan (Sweden)
2013	Thomas Nataas (Norway)	-	Jimmy Ålund (Sweden)	Michael Gullqvist (Sweden)
2012	Risto Poutiainen (Finland)	Manty Bugeja (Malta) (D); Leif Andréasson (Sweden) (F)	Thomas Lindström (Sweden)	Michael Gullqvist (Sweden)
2011	Urs Erbacher (Switzerland)	Fred Hanssen (Norway) (D); Ulf Leanders (Sweden) (F)	Jimmy Ålund (Sweden)	Michael Gullqvist (Sweden)
2010	Urs Erbacher (Switzerland)	Timo Habermann (Germany) (D); Dan Larsen (Denmark) (F)	Michael Malmgren (Sweden)	Johan Lindberg (Sweden)
2009	Andy Carter (United Kingdom)	Timo Habermann (Germany) (D); Ulf Leanders (Sweden) (F)	Jimmy Ålund (Sweden)	Mats Eriksson (Sweden)

=== Records ===
European Drag Racing Championship Records
Category	Record Type	Driver	Time/Speed	Location	Date
Top Fuel Dragster	1000 ft Time	Ida Zetterström (Finland)	3.773 sec	Santa Pod (United Kingdom)	May 2023
Top Fuel Dragster	1000 ft Speed	Duncan Micaleff (Malta)	321.40 mph	Tierp Arena (Sweden)	August 2024
Top Methanol Dragster	1/4 Mile Time	Timo Habermann (Germany)	5.209 sec	Tierp Arena (Sweden)	August 2015
Top Methanol Dragster	1/4 Mile Speed	Chris Polidano (Malta)	278.45 mph	Tierp Arena (Sweden)	August 2014
Top Methanol Funny Car	1/4 Mile Time	Jonnie Lindberg (Sweden)	5.426 sec	Santa Pod (United Kingdom)	September 2013
Top Methanol Funny Car	1/4 Mile Speed	Jonnie Lindberg (Sweden)	268.86 mph	Tierp Arena (Sweden)	August 2013
Pro Modified	1/4 Mile Time	Jan Ericsson (Sweden)	5.724 sec	Santa Pod (United Kingdom)	May 2022
Pro Modified	1/4 Mile Speed	Tero Laukkanen (Finland)	260.11 mph	Tierp Arena (Sweden)	August 2015
Pro Stock	1/4 Mile Time	Jimmy Ålund (Sweden)	6.485 sec	Tierp Arena (Sweden)	August 2019
Pro Stock	1/4 Mile Speed	Jimmy Ålund (Sweden)	215.09 mph	Tierp Arena (Sweden)	June 2015

== Racing ==
=== Categories ===
Sources:

- FIA Top Fuel Dragster (TF)
- FIA Top Methanol Dragster and Funny Car (TM)
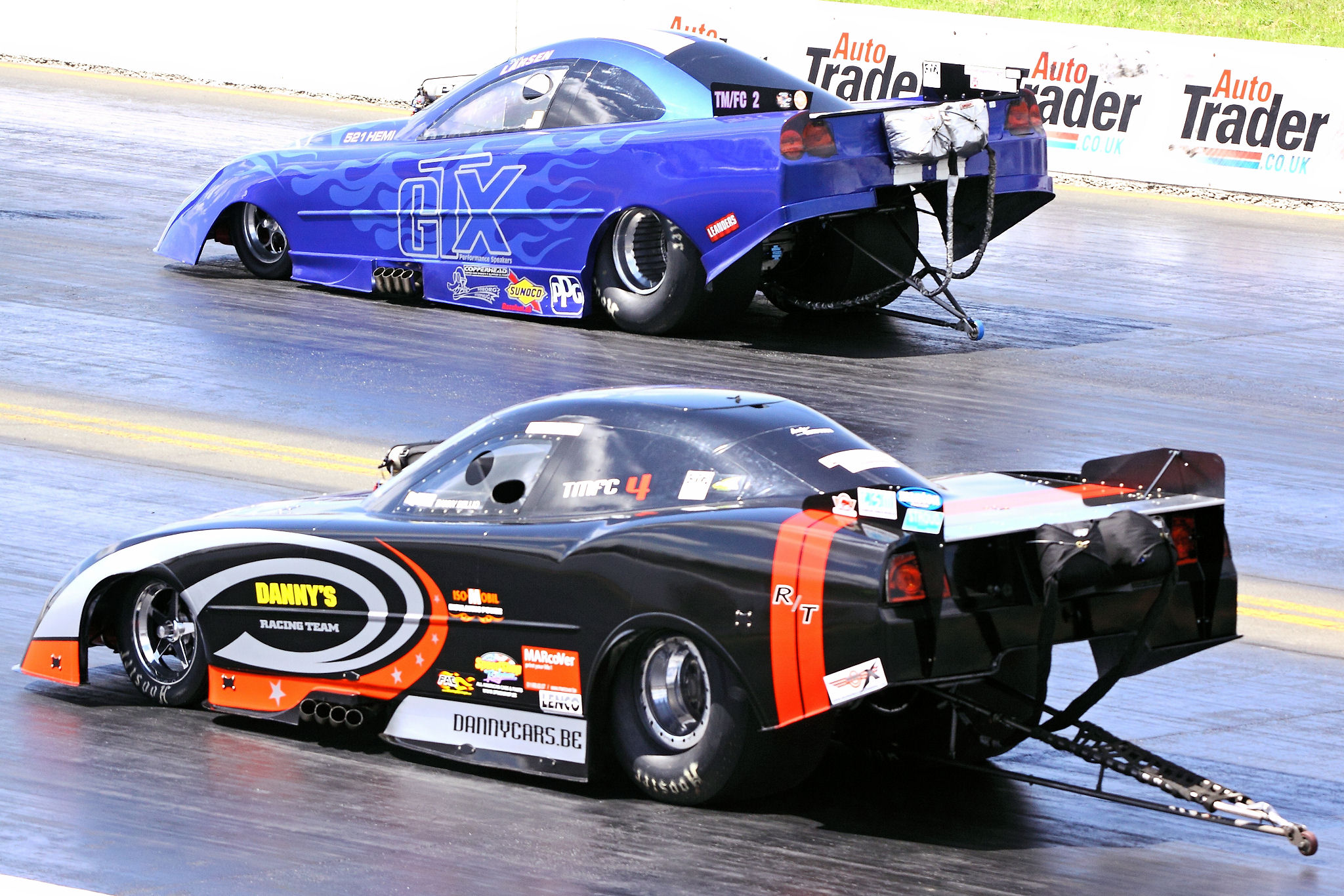
  FIA Top Methanol Funny Cars - Santa Pod 2010
- FIA Pro Stock Car (PRO)
- FIA Pro Modified (PM)
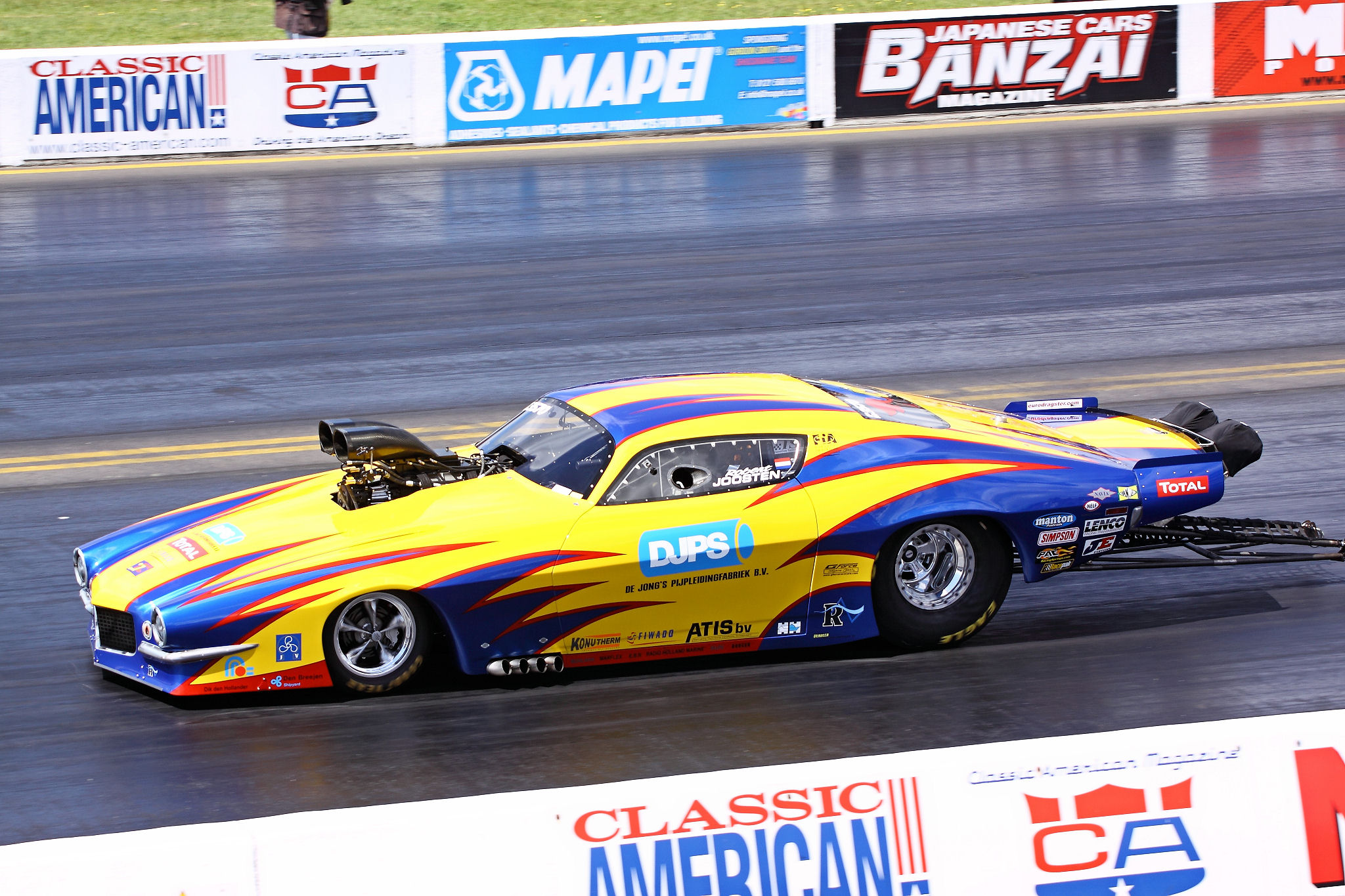
  FIA Pro Modified - Santa Pod 2010

The European Drag Racing Championship began with five separate categories until 2017 when the Top Methanol Dragster and the Top Methanol Funny Car were combined. Top Methanol Dragster was previously called Top Alcohol Dragster and Top Methanol Funny Car was previously called Top Alcohol Funny Car.

=== Regulations ===
==== Drivers ====
Anti-doping regulations are enforced, with each driver individually responsible for ensuring they know the most current regulations and that they comply. Each suit must comply with set regulations, including the inclusion of the FIA European Drag Racing Championship logo on their right hand chest area on the front of their suit. A minimum size of 8 centimetres by 8 centimetres must also be adhered to.

==== Cars ====
Cars display each driver's name and national flag. The FIA European Drag Racing Championship logo has to be exhibited on the side of each vehicle. A minimum size of 12 centimetres by 12 centimetres must also be adhered to and follow the placement structure:

- Dragsters: exterior, lower back corner of back wings spill plates
- Funny Cars: exterior, top back corner of back wings spills plates
- Pro Stock and Pro Modified: back quarter panel

It is also mandatory to display on the vehicle, the driver's FIA European Drag Racing Championship tournament number. An abbreviated code identifies not only the car owner, but the competition number also indicated the class of competition.

Drivers that rank top ten in the previous year's competition also display this rank on their vehicle in place of their race number or start number.

==== Safety Equipment ====
The driver's self-protective gear is monitored by FIA along with drag car safety equipment. Drivers wear flame resistant suits for protection, heart rate technology that allows monitoring of the drivers heart rate to prevent health concerns such as a heart attack, and helmets that are specified with headrest materials. The drag racing cars contain certified safety harnesses, air bags and parachutes. Single parachutes are recommended when drivers are exceeding 150 mph and double parachutes for speeds greater than 200 mph. Circuit safety equipment includes safety barriers, debris fences, and energy absorbing tyre barriers.

=== Qualifying to compete ===
Drivers are required to pay a fee in order to be allowed to race in the Championships at least 30 days prior to events. This €800 (plus VAT) fee is payable to the Championship Administration and enables drivers to participate in every round of the Championship. Normal race entry fees also apply. Specific registrations fees are as follows:

Entity	Fee
Swedish VAT registered company	1000€
VAT registered company within the EU	800€
Company outside the EU	800€
Private person incl 200VAT	1000€

Drivers from outside of Europe are not excluded from competing. All drivers are required to attain a FIA International Competition license specific to their drag category.

=== Race day ===
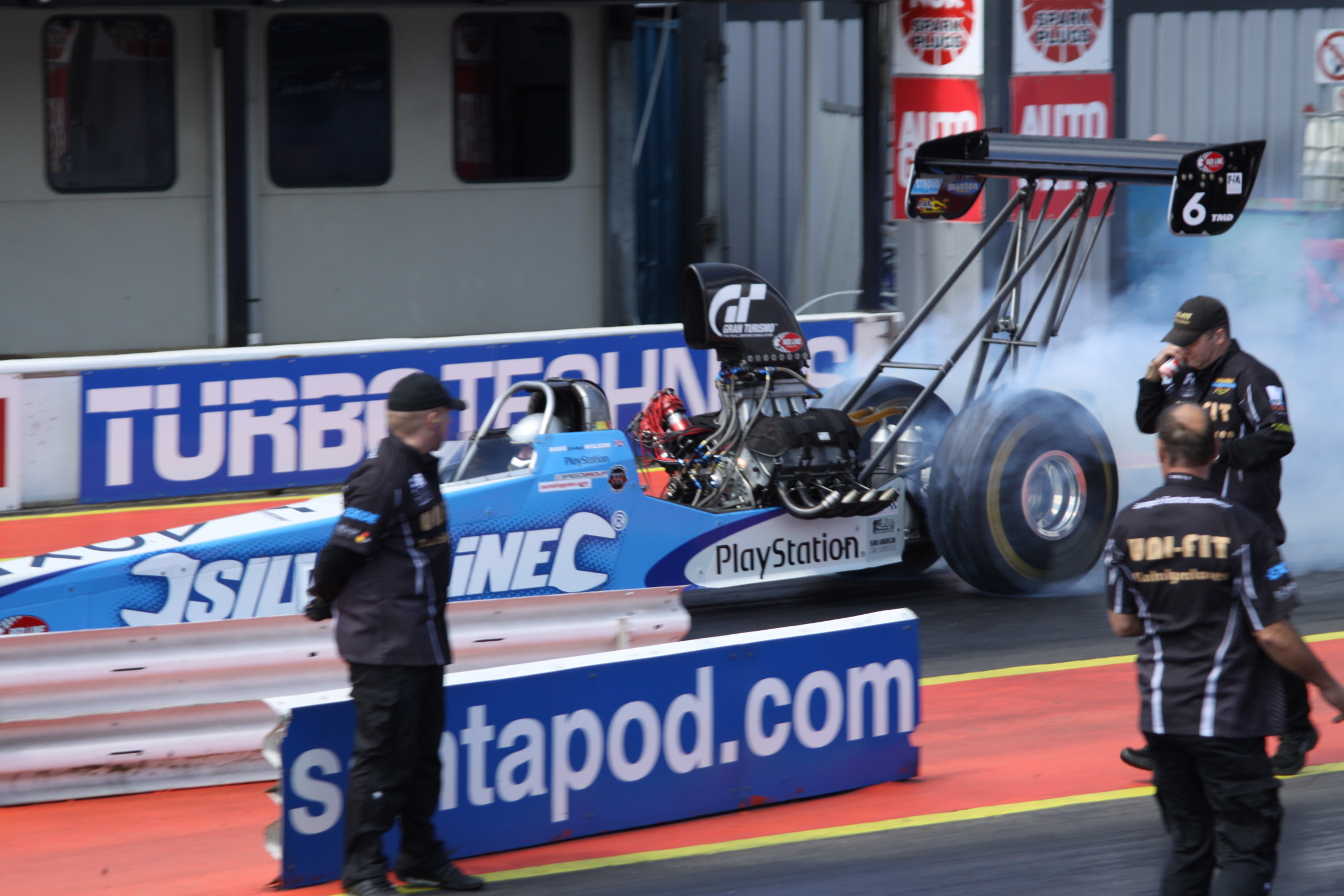
FIA Top Methanol Dragster pre-race burnout - Santa Pod

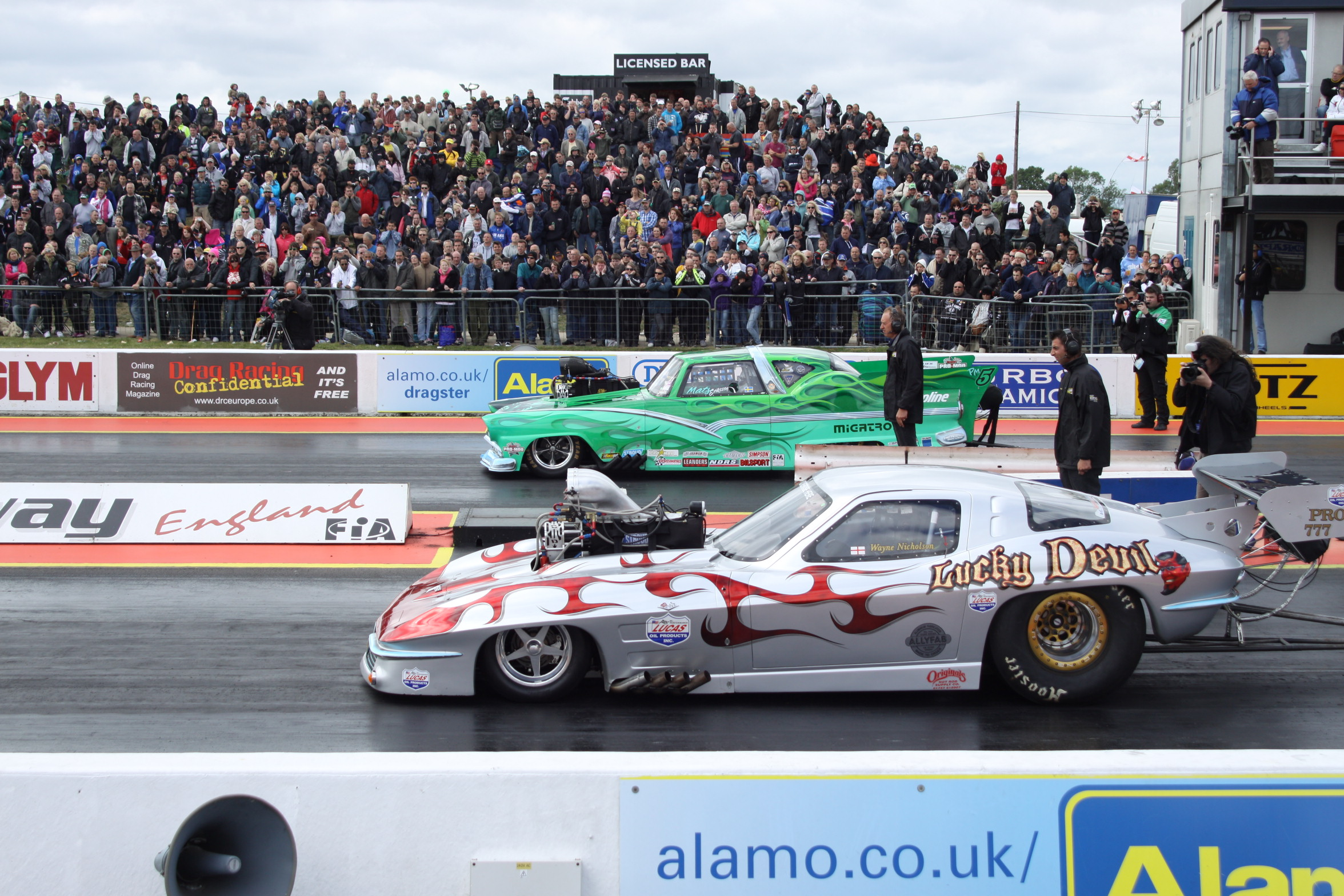
Drivers position their cars on the starting line at a FIA European Drag Racing Championship event

Burn-outs take place prior to the commencement of the race, creating heat on the tire, improving friction. Cars then line up at the starting line, this is known as staging. An electronic set of lights, known as a christmas tree, indicate the commencement of the race. The lights consist of two small amber lights at the top which are connected to a light beam that travels down the track. As the front tires break this beam, the car moves to 180 millimetres from the starting line itself. When all racers are staged, the race begins as the green light is activated on the christmas tree. If the drivers begin before the illumination of the christmas tree green light they are disqualified, and a red light is used to indicate the early start. Disqualifications also occur when a driver crosses the centre line on the race track between lanes, contacts a wall or track fixture, unsuccessful attendance or fails technical inspection. The maximum speed, reaction time and elapsed time are recorded for each race. The reaction time is a measure of the drivers take off after the illumination of the christmas tree green light. The time taken for the vehicle to travel from the start line to the finish is the elapsed time. The first driver to reach the finish line wins the race.

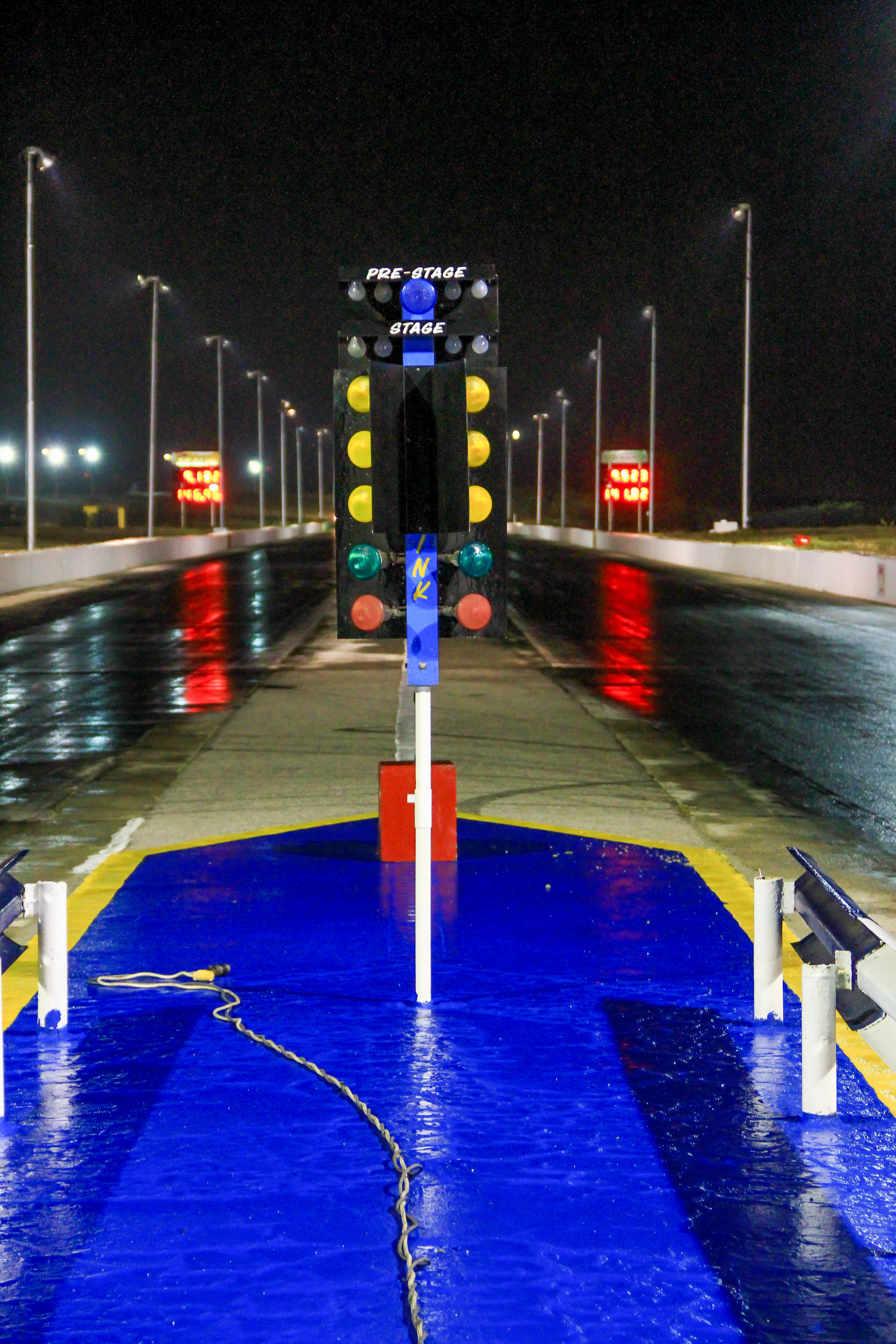
Drag racing christmas tree

== Point system ==
Points are awarded in two ways:

1. From the qualifying events that enable participants to proceed to the elimination rounds, and
2. From the elimination rounds that take place after the qualifying events.

The number of elimination rounds are determined by the number of cars in each event. The following table shows the current allocation for points in each round: Elimination Round Points are awarded:

1 to 2 Cars	Points
Winner Runner-up	40 points 20 points
3 to 4 cars	Points
Winner Runner-up 1st round loser	60 points 40 points 20 points
5 to 8 cars	Points
Winner Runner-up 3rd round loser 2nd round loser 1st round loser	80 points 60 points 60 points 40 points 20 points
9 to 16 cars	Points
Winner Runner-up 3rd round loser 2nd round loser 1st round loser	100 points 80 points 60 points 40 points 20 points

10 points are also awarded to each contestant that qualify in one run. Qualifying Position Points are awarded:

Position	Points
1st	8
2nd	7
3rd	6
4th	5
5th & 6th	4
7th & 8th	3
9th through 12th	2
13th through 16th	1

In 2013 points were introduced for the fastest three elapsed times in qualify rounds.

ET Times	Points
1st fastest	3
2nd fastest	2
3rd fastest	1

To break a tie, three steps take place:

1. The full season of racing is reviewed, with the driver with the most head to head victories winning the tie.
2. The full season of elimination racing is reviewed, with the driver who has won the most rounded winning the tie.
3. Tie-breaks points for the full season of event to be applied, with the highest point scorer winning the tie.

Season Results	Points
Event Winner	5
Runner-up	3
Semi Finalist	2
Quarter Finalist	1

=== Postponed Events ===
An event is classed as postponed if a portion of the event has to be rescheduled for any reason. If events are rescheduled, participants that have qualified but are unable to return will be permitted to automatically withdraw, receiving zero points. Participants that do not wish to be withdrawn must contact the Event Director or Clerk of the Course in order to receive any points that were earned up until the time of postponement.

=== Suspended Events ===
If any event is suspended prior to any qualifying race taking place, each participant that passed the tech inspection will be allocated 10 points.

If a qualifying event has taken place and subsequently the event is suspended, only points for the qualifying round and first round will be awarded. Any participant who did not qualify will receive zero points. All point allocations will adhere to the regulations of the FIA Drag Racing Championship.

During an elimination round, if an event is suspended, all participants that had not been eliminated at the commencement of that round will be allocated loser points for that round, as per the points table.

=== Points Rules ===
- Points are non-transferable from participant to participant.
- After qualifying ends, Low Elapsed Time attempts will not be allowed.
- Low Elapsed Times will be allowed on the final run of a participant prior to elimination.
- Participants whose cars have been damaged beyond repair will be given the option to leave the event prior to elimination, at the discretion of the event Steward, while maintaining points and financial awards.

=== Alternates ===
Ladders will be established at the end of qualification events. After this, pairings are unable to be changed. If a participate is unable to make the elimination first round, the fastest non-qualifier will be put in place as an alternate. Points and financial awards earned by the participant in the first round will still be awarded to the original qualifier. The original qualifier must be on the race track premises, along with the car at the commencement of the first round. The awards will be otherwise deducted, and the alternate will be given the round points and financial awards.

== Race Tracks ==
The European Drag Racing Championship currently consists of four championship events across three host countries: In previous years, the championship has been run over six rounds in four countries.

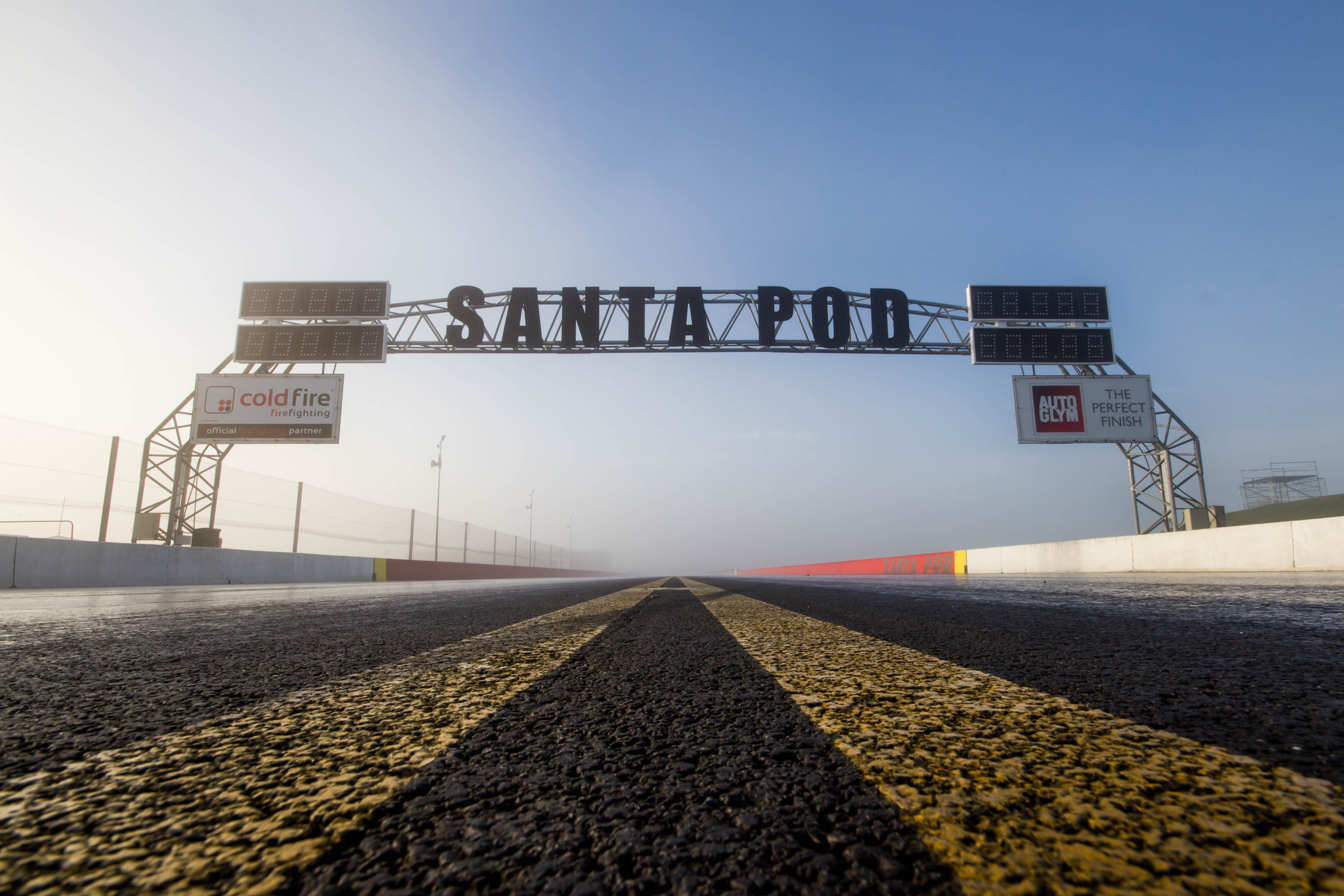
Santa Pod Raceway finish line

- Santa Pod Raceway in the UK
- Tierp Arena in Sweden
- Hockenheim Ring in Germany

Previous venues:

- Alastaro Circuit in Finland

Commencing in May at Santa Pod, and concluding with the finals annually in September in the same location. Traditionally, the second and fifth stages are held in Tierp Arena and the third and fourth stages in Alastaro Circuit and Hockenheim Ring. The races take place on a track known as the drag strip. Before the drag strip a feature referred to as a 'water box' is used by the racers to do burnouts. The typical distance of a drag strip is a quarter of a mile, 1320 feet/402 metres. A shut down area exists immediately after the finishing line enabling the vehicles to stop in a room designed especially for that task.

== Season Schedules ==
2025

- Round 1 – Santa Pod May, GBR May 23-26
- Round 2 – Tierp Arena, SWE August 07-10
- Round 3 – Hockenheimring, DEU August 29-31
- Round 4 – Santa Pod Raceway, GBR, September 04-07

2018

- Round 1 - Santa Pod Raceway, UK, 25–28 May
- Round 2 - Tierp Arena, Sweden, 7–10 June
- Round 3 - Alastaro, Finland, 28 June – 1 July
- Round 4 - HockenheimRing, Germany, 17–19 August
- Round 5 - Tierp Arena, Sweden, 23–26 August
- Round 6 - FIA European Finals, Santa Pod Raceway, UK, 6–19 September

2017

- Round 1 - Santa Pod Raceway, UK, 26–29 May
- Round 2 - Tierp Arena, Sweden, 15–18 June
- Round 3 - Alastaro, Finland, 29 June – 2 July
- Round 4 - HockenheimRing, Germany, 18–20 August
- Round 5 - Tierp Arena, Sweden, 24–27 August
- Round 6 - FIA European Finals, Santa Pod Raceway, UK, 8–10 September

2016

- Round 1 - Santa Pod Raceway, UK, 27–30 May
- Round 2 - Tierp Arena, Sweden, 16–19 June
- Round 3 - Alastaro, Finland, 7–10 July
- Round 4 - HockenheimRing, Germany, 19–21 August
- Round 5 - Tierp Arena, Sweden, 25–28 August
- Round 6 - FIA European Finals, Santa Pod Raceway, UK, 9–11 September

2015

- Round 1 - Santa Pod Raceway, UK, 22–25 May
- Round 2 - Tierp Arena, Sweden, 4–7 June
- Round 3 - Alastaro, Finland, 2–5 July
- Round 4 - HockenheimRing, Germany, 7–9 August
- Round 5 - Tierp Arena, Sweden, 20–23 August
- Round 6 - FIA European Finals, Santa Pod Raceway, UK, 3–6 September

2014

- Round 1 - Santa Pod Raceway, UK, 23–26 May
- Round 2 - Alastaro, Finland, 3–6 July
- Round 3 - HockenheimRing, Germany, 8–10 August
- Round 4 - Tierp Arena, Sweden, 21–24 August
- Round 5 - FIA European Finals, Santa Pod Raceway, UK, 4–7 September

2013

- Round 1 - Santa Pod Raceway, UK, 24–27 May
- Round 2 - Tierp Arena, Sweden, 13–16 June
- Round 3 - Alastaro, Finland, 4–7 July
- Round 4 - HockenheimRing, Germany, 9–11 August
- Round 5 - Tierp Arena, Sweden, 22–25 August
- Round 6 - FIA European Finals, Santa Pod Raceway, UK, 5–8 September

2012

- Round 1 - Santa Pod Raceway, UK, 2–4 June
- Round 2 - Tierp Arena, Sweden, 14–17 June
- Round 3 - Alastaro, Finland, 5–8 July
- Round 4 - Tierp Arena, Sweden, 23–26 August
- Round 5 - FIA European Finals, Santa Pod Raceway, UK, 6–9 September

NOTE: Hockenheimring (10-12 August) was cancelled after officials had issues with the track after all track prep was removed under FIA requests because the launch pad area is part of the runoff at the road course used by Formula One in July.

From 2012, the European Drag Racing Championship consisted of 6 rounds.

2011

- Round 1 - Santa Pod Raceway, UK, 27–30 May
- Round 2 - Tierp Arena, Sweden, 10–12 June
- Round 3 - Alastaro, Finland, 30 June - 3 July
- Round 4 - HockenheimRing, Germany, 12–14 August
- Round 5 - FIA European Finals, Santa Pod Raceway, UK, 8–11 September

2010

- Round 1 - Santa Pod Raceway, UK, 28–31 May
- Round 2 - Alastaro, Finland, 1–4 July
- Round 3 - Mantorp Park, Sweden, 29–1 August
- Round 4 - HockenheimRing, Germany, 13–15 August
- Round 5 - FIA European Finals, Santa Pod Raceway, UK, 9–12 September

== See also ==
- FIA
- List of FIA championships
- Drag Racing
- DragStrip
- Drag Racing Venues in Europe
