= Ida Zetterström =

Swedish dragracer

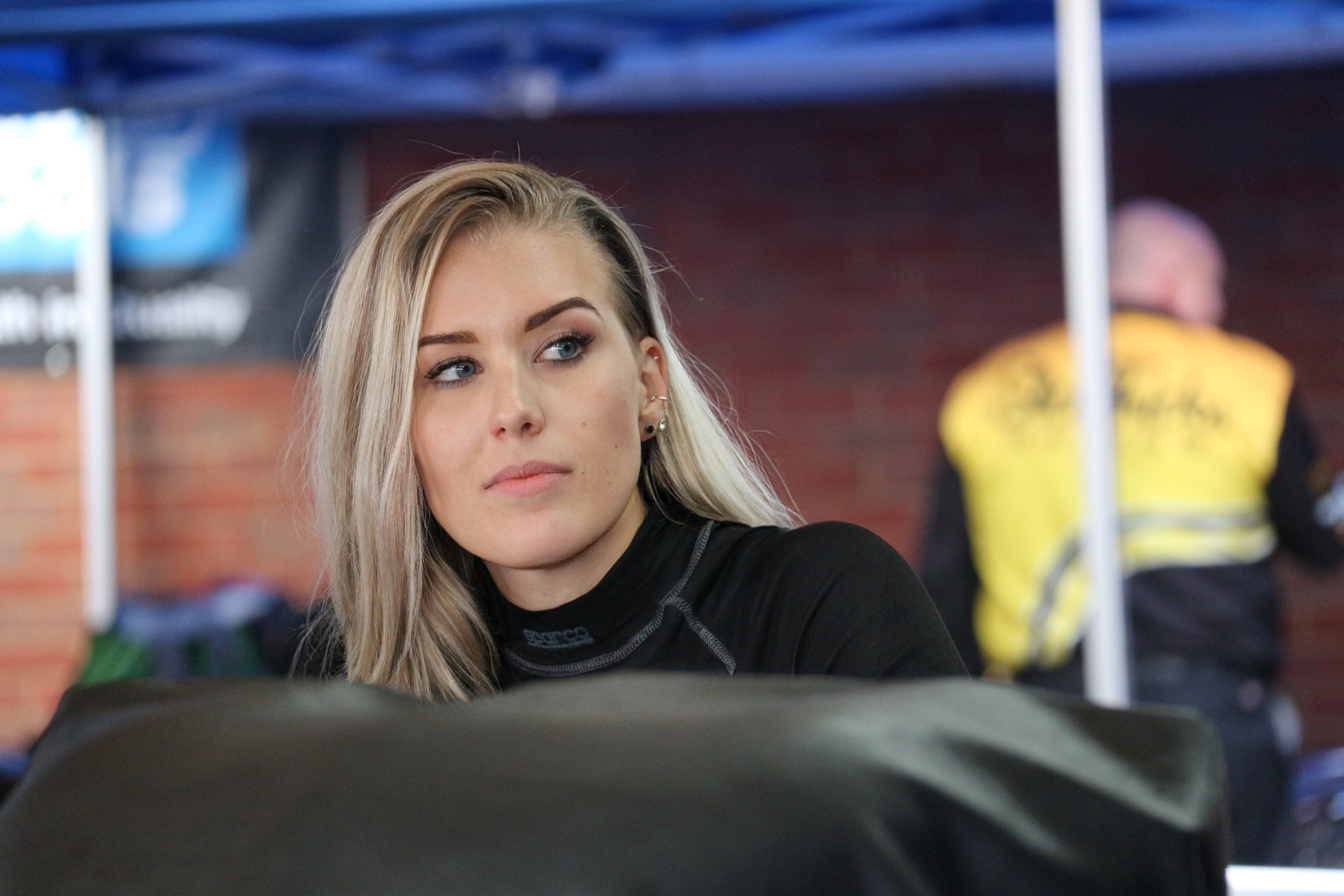
- Zetterström in 2021
- Nationality: Swedish
- Born: May 2, 1994 (age 32) Stockholm, Sweden

NHRA Mission Foods Drag Racing Series career
- Debut season: 2024
- Current team: JCM Racing
- Fastest laps: Best ET; 3.720 seconds; Best Speed; 334.32 mph (538.04 km/h)

Previous series
- FIA European Drag Racing Championship

Championship titles
- 2023 2019, 2020: FIA European Top Fuel Champion; Super Street Bike
- Statistics up to date as of September 15, 2025.

Ida Zetterström (born May 2, 1994), is a Swedish drag racing driver. She currently competes in Top Fuel in the NHRA Mission Foods Drag Racing Series for JCM Racing.

== Early life ==
Zetterström was born in Stockholm, Sweden and lived in Jomala, Åland, Finland. She started racing Junior Dragster when she was eight years old. At the age of 16, she earned her Super Comp license.

== Racing career ==
Zetterström began competing on motorcycles in the Super Street Bike class in 2017. She was the Super Street Bike Scandinavian Champion in 2019 and 2020. She became the first woman to win a championship in the class and was the world's fastest woman on a motorcycle with a top speed of 346.9 kilometers per hour on a distance of just over 400 meters (¼ mile). At the time, it was the second highest speed ever measured in Europe.

In European Drag Racing Championship Top Fuel dragster, she and the team set a new European record of 3.782 seconds in 2022. In July 2023, she set a new track record at Mantorp Park with 4.35 seconds and 246.68 mph. Closing the 2023 season, Zetterstrom had secured four Top Fuel wins and won the overall Championship.

Zetterström moved to the United States to drive at least five races for JCM Racing in the National Hot Rod Association, making her debut in 2024 in Brainerd at the Lucas Oil Nationals.
