= 2022 NHRA Camping World Drag Racing Series =

2022 NHRA Camping World Drag Racing Series season
- League: NHRA
- Sport: Drag racing
- Champions: Brittany Force (TF); Ron Capps (FC); Erica Enders (PS); Matt Smith (PSM)

NHRA seasons
- ← 2021 2023 →

The 2022 NHRA Camping World Drag Racing Season was announced on September 16, 2021.

It was the 67th season of the National Hot Rod Association's top drag racing competition. The NHRA will have 22 Top Fuel and Funny Car events, 19 Pro Stock events, and 15 Pro Stock Motorcycle events.

== Schedule ==
Schedule released September 16, 2021 (most recently revised June 16, 2022 with media rights and Pro Stock addition).

2022 NHRA Camping World Drag Racing Series Schedule
| Date | Race | Site | TV | Winners | | | |
| Date | Race | Site | TV | Top Fuel | Funny Car | Pro Stock | PS Motorcycle |
|---|---|---|---|---|---|---|---|
| Feb 17–20 | Lucas Oil Winternationals presented by ProtectTheHarvest.com | Pomona, CA | FS1 | Justin Ashley (1) | Robert Hight (1) | Erica Enders (1) | N/A |
| Feb 25–27 | NHRA Arizona Nationals | Chandler, AZ | FS1 | Mike Salinas (1) | Robert Hight (2) | Aaron Stanfield (1) | N/A |
| Mar 10–13 | Amalie Motor Oil NHRA Gatornationals | Gainesville, FL | FS1 | Tripp Tatum (1) | Matt Hagan (1) | Dallas Glenn (1) | Karen Stoffer (1) |
| Apr 1–3 | NHRA Four-Wide Nationals ^{4 Lanes} | Las Vegas, NV | FS1 | Brittany Force (1) | Ron Capps (1) | Erica Enders (2) | N/A |
| April 22–24 | NHRA SpringNationals | Baytown, TX | FS1 | Brittany Force (2) | Matt Hagan (2) | Erica Enders (3) | Steve Johnson (1) |
| Apr 29 – May 1 | Circle K NHRA Four-Wide Nationals ^{4 Lanes} | Concord, NC | FS1 | Mike Salinas (2) | John Force (1) | N/A | Steve Johnson (2) |
| May 13–15 | Virginia NHRA Nationals | Petersburg, VA | FS1 | Brittany Force (3) | Robert Hight (3) | JR Carr ^{MM} | Matt Smith (1) |
| Jun 3–5 | NHRA New England Nationals | Epping, NH | FS1 | Mike Salinas (3) | Matt Hagan (3) | Erica Enders (4) | N/A |
| Jun 17-19 | NHRA Thunder Valley Nationals | Bristol, TN | FOX | Justin Ashley (2) | Ron Capps (2) | Aaron Stanfield (2) | Jerry Savoie (1) |
| Jun 23–26 | Summit Racing Equipment NHRA Nationals | Norwalk, OH | FOX | Mike Salinas (4) | Robert Hight (4) | Erica Enders (5) | Angelle Sampey (1) |
| Jul 15–17 | Dodge Power Brokers NHRA Mile-High Nationals | Morrison, CO | FOX | Leah Pruett (1) | Robert Hight (5) | Matt Hartford (1) | Matt Smith (2) |
| Jul 22–24 | DENSO NHRA Sonoma Nationals | Sonoma, CA | FOX | Brittany Force (4) | Bob Tasca III (1) | Erica Enders (6) | Joey Gladstone (1) |
| Jul 29–31 | Flav-R-Pac NHRA Northwest Nationals | Kent, WA | FOX | Tony Schumacher (1) | Robert Hight (6) | Troy Coughlin Jr. (1) | N/A |
| Aug 12-14 | Menards NHRA Nationals presented by PetArmor | Topeka, KS | FS1 | Antron Brown (1) | Bob Tasca III (2) | Troy Coughlin Jr. (2) | Joey Gladstone (2) |
| Aug 18–21 | Lucas Oil NHRA Nationals | Brainerd, MN | FOX | Steve Torrence (1) | Bob Tasca III (3) | JR Carr ^{MM} | N/A |
| Aug 31– Sep 5 | Dodge Power Brokers NHRA U.S. Nationals ^{1.5} | Brownsburg, IN | FS1/FOX | Antron Brown (2) | Ron Capps (3) | Greg Anderson (1) | Matt Smith (3) |
Countdown to the Championship
| Sep 15-18 | Pep Boys NHRA Nationals | Mohnton, PA | FOX | Austin Prock (1) | Robert Hight (7) | Erica Enders (7) | Joey Gladstone (3) |
| Sep 23–25 | Betway NHRA Carolina Nationals | Concord, NC | FS1 | Antron Brown (3) | Ron Capps (4) | Aaron Stanfield (3) | N/A |
| Sep 30 - Oct 2 | NHRA Midwest Nationals | Madison, IL | FS1 | Steve Torrence (2) | Robert Hight (8) | Erica Enders (8) | Matt Smith (4) |
| Oct 13–16 | Texas NHRA FallNationals | Ennis, TX | FS1 | Justin Ashley (3) | Ron Capps (5) | Erica Enders (9) | Hector Arana Jr (1) |
| Oct 27–30 | NHRA Nevada Nationals | Las Vegas, NV | FS1 | Brittany Force (5) | Matt Hagan (4) | Erica Enders (10) | Hector Arana Jr (2) |
| Nov 10–13 | Auto Club NHRA Finals ^{1.5} | Pomona, CA | FS1 | Austin Prock (2) | Cruz Pedregon (1) | Greg Anderson (2) | Angie Smith (1) |

=== Additional rules for specially marked races ===
4 Lanes: The Four-Wide Nationals in both Las Vegas and Charlotte in the spring will compete with cars on four lanes.

- All cars will qualify on each lane as all four lanes will be used in qualifying.
- Three rounds with cars using all four lanes.
- In Rounds One and Two, the top two drivers (of four) will advance to the next round.
- The pairings are set as follows:
  - Race One: 1, 8, 9, 16
  - Race Two: 4, 5, 12, 13
  - Race Three: 2, 7, 10, 15
  - Race Four: 3, 6, 11, 14
  - Semifinal One: Top two in Race One and Race Two
  - Semifinal Two: Top two in Race Three and Race Four
  - Finals: Top two in Semifinal One and Semifinal Two
- Lane choice determined by times in previous round. In first round, lane choice determined by fastest times.
- Drivers who advance in Rounds One and Two will receive 20 points for each round advancement.
- In Round Three, the winner of the race will be declared the race winner and will collect 40 points. The runner-up will receive 20 points. Third and fourth place drivers will be credited as semifinal losers.

1.5: The U. S. Nationals and Auto Club Finals will have their race points increased by 50% . Drivers who qualify but are eliminated in the first round receive 30 points, and each round win is worth 30 points. The top four receive 10, 9, 8, and 7 points, respectively, for qualifying positions, with the 5–6 drivers receiving 6 points, 7–8 drivers receiving 5 points, 9–12 receiving 4 points, and 13–16 receiving 3 points. Also, the top four, not three, drivers after each session receive points for fastest times in each round (4-3-2-1).

MM: Pro Stock Car at this event is a non-championship race with the Mountain Motor formula, where cars can use carburetors or electronic fuel injection, do not have an engine displacement limit, and weighs a minimum of 2,450 pounds, compared to the NHRA Pro Stock formula that features electronic fuel injection, a 500ci (8193cc) engine displacement limit, and 2,350 pounds weight.
