= New England Dragway =

Race track in Brentwood, New Hampshire, US

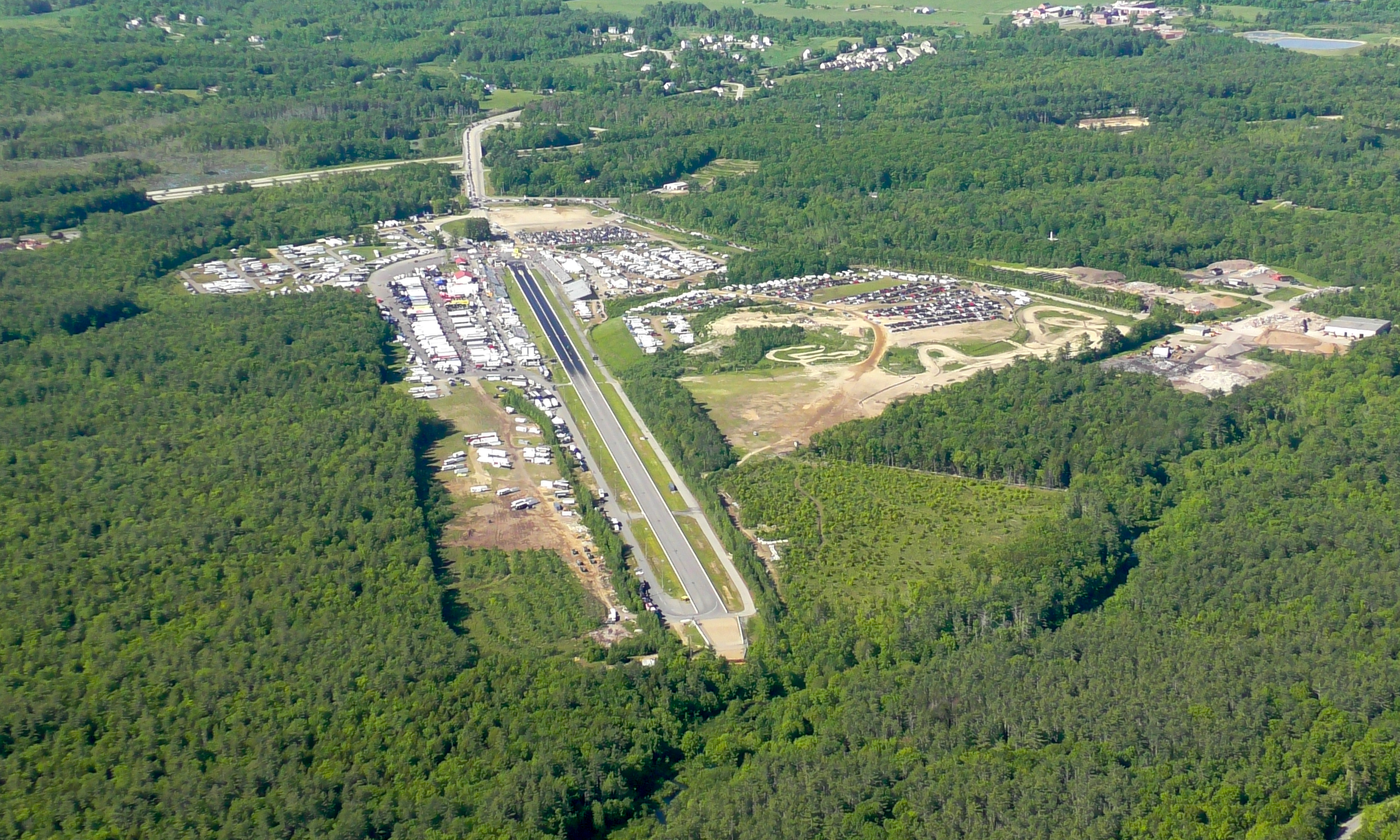
- Aerial view in 2017
- Location: Epping and Brentwood; New Hampshire, U.S.
- Coordinates: 43°01′15″N 71°01′38″W
- Capacity: 25,000
- Address: 280 Exeter Road; Epping, New Hampshire
- Opened: September 11, 1966; 60 years ago
- Major events: NHRA Mission Foods Drag Racing Series; NHRA New England Nationals
- Website: nedragway.com

Drag strip
- Surface: Concrete
- Length: 0.250 mi (0.402 km)

New England Dragway is a one-quarter-mile (0.40 km) dragway in the towns of Epping and Brentwood in Rockingham County, New Hampshire, United States. The track hosts National Hot Rod Association (NHRA) events including the New England Nationals as part of the NHRA Mission Foods Drag Racing Series. The track also hosts a regional event as part of the NHRA Lucas Oil Drag Racing Series.

== History ==
New England Dragway opened for racing on September 11, 1966. Organized drag racing in the New England area had begun in 1950 at various public and military airports in the region. In that same year, a small number of Boston-area enthusiasts formed the New England Timing Association (NETA) to promote the sport. NETA based its organization and rules on those used by the Southern California Timing Association (SCTA), and began hosting drag races on an irregular basis at airports in Newington, New Hampshire; Beverly, Massachusetts; and finally at Sanford, Maine. Three years later, five regional hot rod clubs joined forces to form the New England Hot Rod Council (NEHRC).

The NEHRC held its first official drag racing events in 1953 at the Newington Airport (also known as Pease Air Force Base). In 1955, they began hosting regularly scheduled events at Sanford which began to attract racers from all over New England. Sanford proved to be a popular drag racing venue that drew large spectator crowds and attracted the attention of numerous nationally known racers such as Don Garlits and Art Arfons.

By the mid-1960s, it became clear that airports were not completely satisfactory for conducting organized drag races. Conflicts with pilots, limited control over the condition of the racing surface, and the lack of permanent facilities made it difficult for volunteer organizations to set and maintain a regular schedule for events. Numerous races had to be canceled at the last minute due to this lack of control over the venues.

The NEHRC began looking for a suitable location to purchase land for the construction of a drag strip that would service the Boston market. After an exhaustive search, a large tract of land in New Hampshire on the border of the rural towns of Epping and Brentwood was purchased by a group of shareholders, and construction of the racing surface and permanent facilities was completed in the late summer of 1966.

The track was originally sanctioned by the American Hot Rod Association (AHRA), and was also qualified by the National Hot Rod Association (NHRA) as an officially recognized track for speed and elapsed time records. New England Dragway played host to an annual stop on the AHRA Grand American Series of Professional Drag Racing Series until that organization's demise in the mid-1980s. The NHRA then become the sanctioning body for the track but did not include it in their national event schedule.

In an effort to get a national event at the track, New England Dragway switched its sanctioning to the International Hot Rod Association (IHRA) in 1992. The IHRA held its North American Nationals at the track from 1992 until 2009.

In 2010, sanctioning returned to the NHRA, and in 2013, following improvements and upgrades to the facility, the drag strip began hosting the NHRA New England Nationals.

The 2020 New England Nationals were canceled due to the COVID-19 pandemic, and the 2023 New England Nationals were cancelled because of weather. That race was replaced by an entire round on Friday and Saturday at Bristol Dragway before the Sunday races.

New England Dragway was scheduled to host the New England Nationals as part of NHRA Mission Foods Drag Racing Series on the weekend of May 31 – June 2, 2024.

== Events ==
New England Dragway hosts weekly bracket racing events for locally and regionally-based non-professional drag racers on the weekends, and races for street-legal vehicles two times during the week. The track also hosts annual drag racing special events for import cars and nostalgia drag racers. For many years the track has also held major events featuring match racing between nitromethane and alcohol-powered funny cars, (Funny Cars Under The Stars), and jet-powered dragsters and funny cars (Jet Cars Under The Stars)

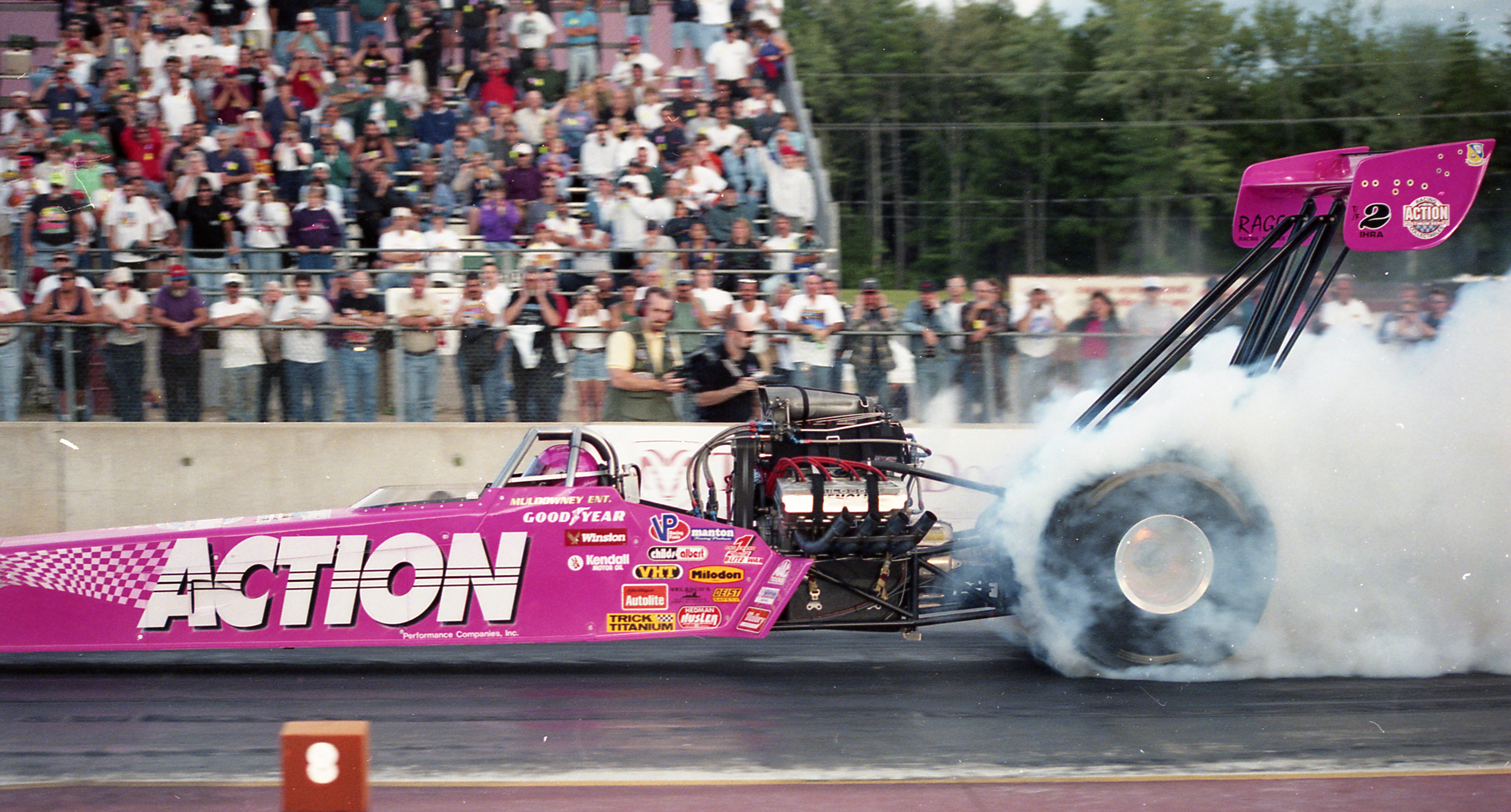
Shirley Muldowney at Nitro Cars Under The Stars in 1996 at New England Dragway

== Notable competitors ==
As the premier drag racing facility in New England, New England Dragway has played host to numerous well-known drag racers since its opening. In the late 1960s and 1970s, "Jungle Jim" Liberman was a frequent competitor at the track. "TV" Tommy Ivo and Bruce Larson also made regular appearances. On July 11, 1998, World Champion dragster driver Shirley Muldowney was the first racer to top the 300-mph mark at the track when she ran 302.82 mph in match race competition.

On June 2, 2024, 16-time NHRA Funny Car champion John Force, 75, won his 157th NHRA Mission Foods Drag Racing Series national event at New England Dragway. Three weeks later, Force suffered a career-ending crash at Virginia Motorsports Park.

== National event winners ==
NHRA New England Nationals Professional Class Winners
Event	Date	Year	Top Fuel	Funny Car	Pro Stock	Top Fuel Harley
2022 NHRA New England Nationals	June 3–5	2022	Mike Salinas	Matt Hagan	Erica Enders	-
2021 NHRA New England Nationals	June 11–13	2021	Billy Torrence	John Force	Aaron Stanfield	-
2019 NHRA New England Nationals	July 5–7	2019	Steve Torrence	Matt Hagan	John DeFlorian Jr. (MM)	Tii Tharpe
2018 NHRA New England Nationals	July 6–8	2018	Steve Torrence	Matt Hagan	Chris McGaha	Doug Vancil
2017 NHRA New England Nationals	June 2–4	2017	Brittany Force	Matt Hagan	Erica Enders	Tii Tharpe
2016 NHRA New England Nationals	June 3–6*	2016	Antron Brown	Ron Capps	Greg Anderson	Jay Turner
2015 NHRA New England Nationals	June 12–14	2015	Tony Schumacher	John Force	Greg Anderson	-
2014 NHRA New England Nationals	June 20–22	2014	Tony Schumacher	Ron Capps	Dave Connolly	-
2013 NHRA New England Nationals	June 21–23	2013	Spencer Massey	Courtney Force	Allen Johnson	

IHRA North American National Professional Class Winners
Event	Date	Year	Top Fuel	Funny Car	Mountain Motor Pro Stock	Top Fuel Harley	Pro Outlaw	Top Alcohol Funny Car	Pro Modified
2009 IHRA North American Nationals	September 11–13	2009	Del Cox Jr.	-	Bob Bertsch	-	-	-	Kenny Lang
2008 IHRA North American Nationals	September 5–7	2008	Tim Boychuck	Andy Kelley	Pete Berner	-	-	Paul Noakes	Jim Halsey
2007 IHRA North American Nationals	September 10–12	2007	Bobby Lagana Jr.	Dale Creasy Jr.	Frank Gugliotta	-	-	Mark Thomas	Mike Janis
2006 IHRA North American Nationals	September 8–10	2006	Bobby Lagana Jr.	Bob Gilbertson	Robert Patrick Jr.	-	-	Rob Atchison	Eddie Ware
2005 IHRA North American Nationals	September 9–11	2005	Doug Foley	-	Frank Gugliotta	-	-	Jim Sickles	Dennis Radford
2004 IHRA North American Nationals	September 10–12	2004	Bruce Litton	-	John Nobile	-	-	Jim Sickles	Pat Musi
2003 IHRA North American Nationals	September 5–7	2003	Clay Millican	-	Carl Baker	-	-	Rob Atchison	Shannon Jenkins
2002 IHRA North American Nationals	September 6–8	2002	Clay Millican	-	Brian Gahm	Steve Stordeur	-	Jimmy Rector	Mitch Stott
2001 IHRA North American Nationals	September 7–9	2009	Clay Millican	-	Gene Wilson	Doug Vancil	-	Jimmy Rector	Mike Janis
2000 IHRA North American Nationals	September 8–10	2000	Jim Head	-	Jon Yoak	Doug Vancil	Laurie Canister	Scott Weney	Troy Critchley
1999 IHRA North American Nationals	September 10–12	1999	Paul Romine	-	John Montecalvo	Bill Furr	Larry Snyder	Von Smith	Al Billes
1998 IHRA North American Nationals	September 11–13	1998	Doug Herbert	-	Stu Evans Jr.	Jay Turner	Larry Snyder	Von Smith	Scotty Cannon
1993 IHRA North American Nationals	September 10–12	1993	Bruce Larson	-	Robert Patrick Jr.	-	-	Jim Bailey	Bill Kuhlmann
1992 IHRA North American Nationals	September 11–13	1992	Doug Herbert	Tom Hoover	Billy Huff	-	-	Todd Paton	Ed Hoover

== New England Hot Rod Hall of Fame ==
The New England Hot Rod Hall of Fame is a memorial located at the entrance to the racing pits of New England Dragway listing more than 100 people, teams, and businesses that have had a significant impact on the hobby of hot rodding and the sport of drag racing in New England.

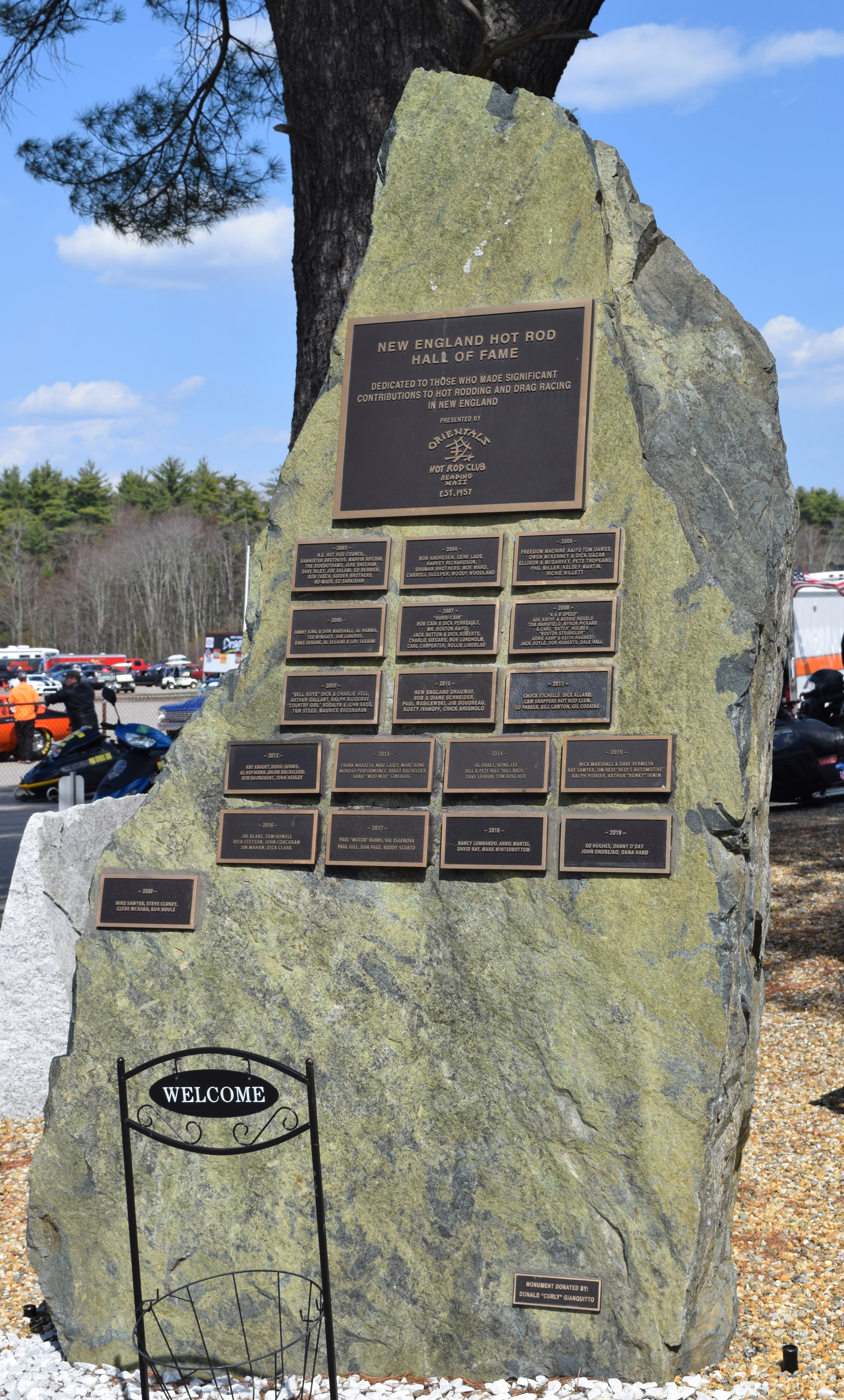
The New England Hot Rod Hall of Fame Memorial at New England Dragway

The New England Hot Rod Hall of Fame was created in 2005 by the Orientals Hot Rod Club of Reading, MA. Each year since the club has inducted at least four new honorees. The list of inductees includes hot rodders, drag racers, drag racing teams, photographers and journalists, promoters, businesses and business owners, and individuals involved in hot rodding and drag racing as support personnel at various drag racing facilities in the New England region.

As of 2021, there are 106 inductees. Sixty-two of them are individual hot rodders and/or drag racers, along with 14 drag racing teams, 16 businesses and business owners, six journalists and photographers, four employees of drag racing facilities, and four clubs or organizations. Many of the inductees can be categorized as belonging to more than one of those groups.

Notable inductees include Frank Maratta, founder of the Hartford Autorama Car Shows and builder and promoter of Connecticut Dragway; Chuck Etchells and Al Hofmann, professional funny car drivers from Connecticut; Arnie "Woo Woo" Ginsburg, a radio personality who provided the musical soundtrack for the hot rod cruising culture in the 1950s and 60s; Marc Rowe, a former racer and longtime race car builder; Moroso Performance, provider of aftermarket performance parts, and Marvin Rifchin, founder of the M&H Tire Company that provides specialty tires for drag racing.

== Current track records ==
Category	E.T.	Speed	Driver	Event	Ref
Top Fuel	3.664		Steve Torrance	2022 NHRA New England Nationals	
Top Fuel		335.57 mph (540.05 km/h)	Brittany Force	2024 NHRA New England Nationals	
Funny Car	3.822		Robert Hight	2017 NHRA New England Nationals	
Funny Car		336.74 mph (541.93 km/h)	Robert Hight	2017 NHRA New England Nationals	
Pro Stock	6.485		Shane Gray	2014 NHRA New England Nationals	
Pro Stock		214.72 mph (345.56 km/h)	Greg Anderson	2015 NHRA New England Nationals	

== See also ==
- Lee USA Speedway, located in nearby Lee
- Star Speedway, also located in Epping
