= Mission Foods =

American food company and subsidiary

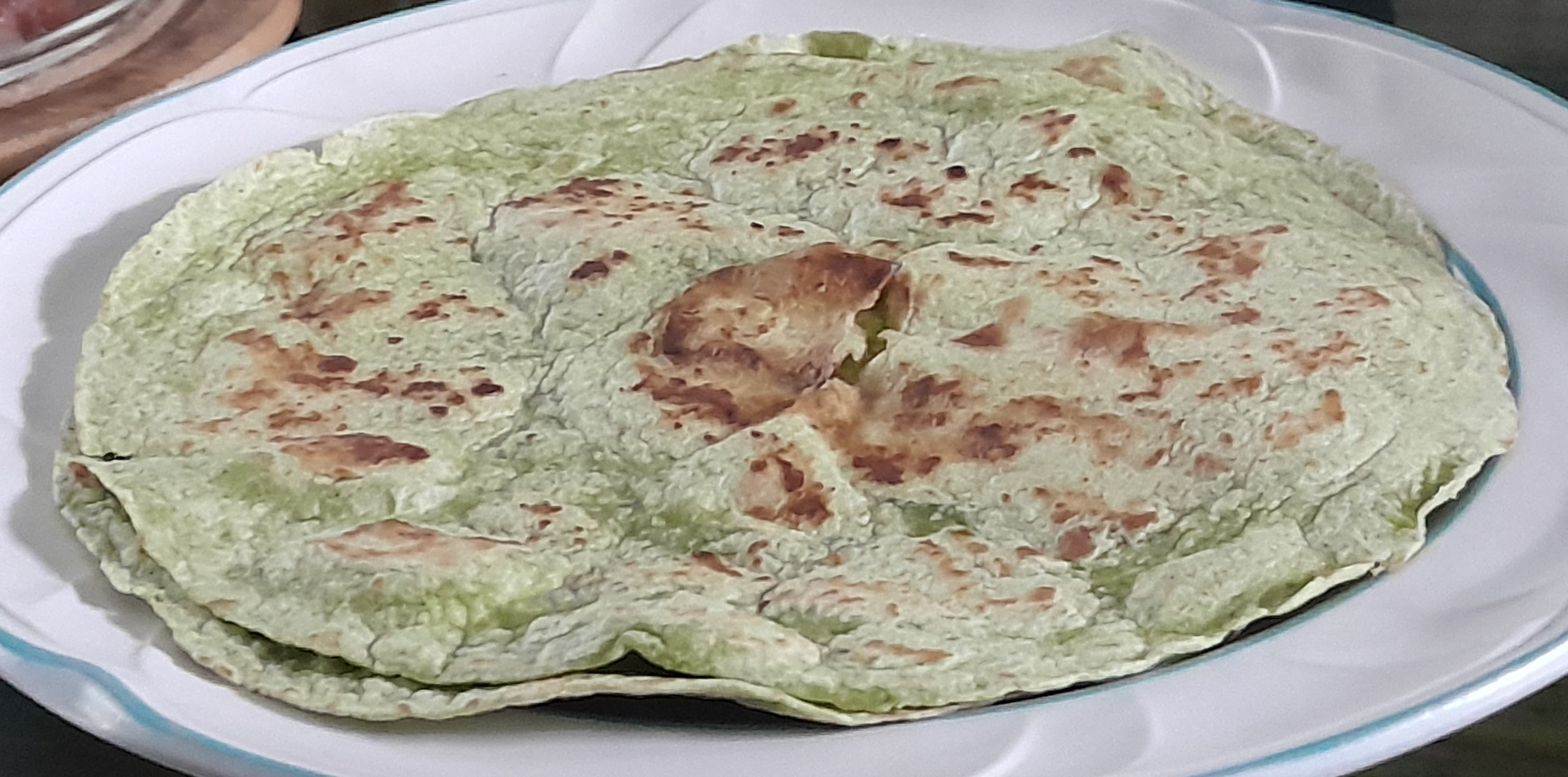
- A semi-seared Mission Foods tortilla
- Type: Subsidiary
- Industry: Food
- Founded: 1977
- Headquarters: Irving, Texas, USA
- Key people: Juan Gonzalez Moreno, Chairman of the Board and Chief Executive Officer of GRUMA
- Number of employees: More than 5,700
- Parent: Gruma
- Website: www.missionfoods.com

Mission Foods, a subsidiary of Gruma Corporation, is an American manufacturer of tortillas and tortilla-related products based in Irving, Texas.

== History ==
Mission Foods was founded as a subsidiary of Grupo Maseca in California in 1977 as a brand name to sell the company's tortillas in the American marketplace. It is one of the world's largest producers of flatbread, tortilla and corn flour products with factories in North and Central America, Europe, Asia and Australia. A tortilla manufacturing plant was opened in Dallas in 1982. Mission Foods launched the Mission brand in Australia in 2009 with a plant located in Epping, Victoria.

== Sponsorships ==
Mission sponsored a tortilla factory attraction between 2001 and 2011 in the then-named Disney California Adventure Park theme park. The factory demonstrated tortilla production on a miniaturized, low-speed automated production line, provided samples of tortillas, and demonstrated recipes to park guests.

=== Australia rules football ===
In January 2009, Australian media reported Mission Foods had agreed on a sponsorship deal with Australian rules football club the Western Bulldogs. The deal is worth $4.5 million over 3 years. In June 2020, Mission Foods and the Western Bulldogs announced a further three-year extension of their sponsorship agreement which will run to the end of 2023.

=== Netball ===
Mission Foods is a major netball sponsor. They have sponsored both Queensland Firebirds team and Netball Singapore. They have sponsored several international netball tournaments hosted in Singapore under including the 2011 World Netball Championships, the 2014 Asian Netball Championships and the Netball Singapore Nations Cup.

=== Motorsports ===
==== Formula One ====
In April 2019, Mission Foods was announced as a partner of McLaren for their Formula One team.

==== IndyCar ====
In April 2019, Mission Foods was also announced as a partner of Arrow McLaren for the Indianapolis 500 and continues to sponsor the team.

==== NHRA ====
Mission Foods is the sponsor of the National Hot Rod Association, with the NHRA Mission Foods Drag Racing Series starting in 2024.

==== NASCAR ====
Mission Foods also sponsors the NASCAR Xfinity Series race at Watkins Glen and the NASCAR Craftsman Truck Series race, also at Watkins Glen.

SCCA

In July 2026, Mission Foods was announced as the title sponsor of the Sports Car Club of America SCCA National Championship Runoffs at Road America.

== Product lines ==
Mission Foods has a range of tortilla products ranging from the traditional corn and flour tortillas to whole wheat and flavored varieties. Most of Mission Foods products are classified as kosher and halal. Mission also sells several varieties of tortilla chips.
