= Bristol Dragway =

Dragstrip in Bristol, Tennessee

Thunder Valley
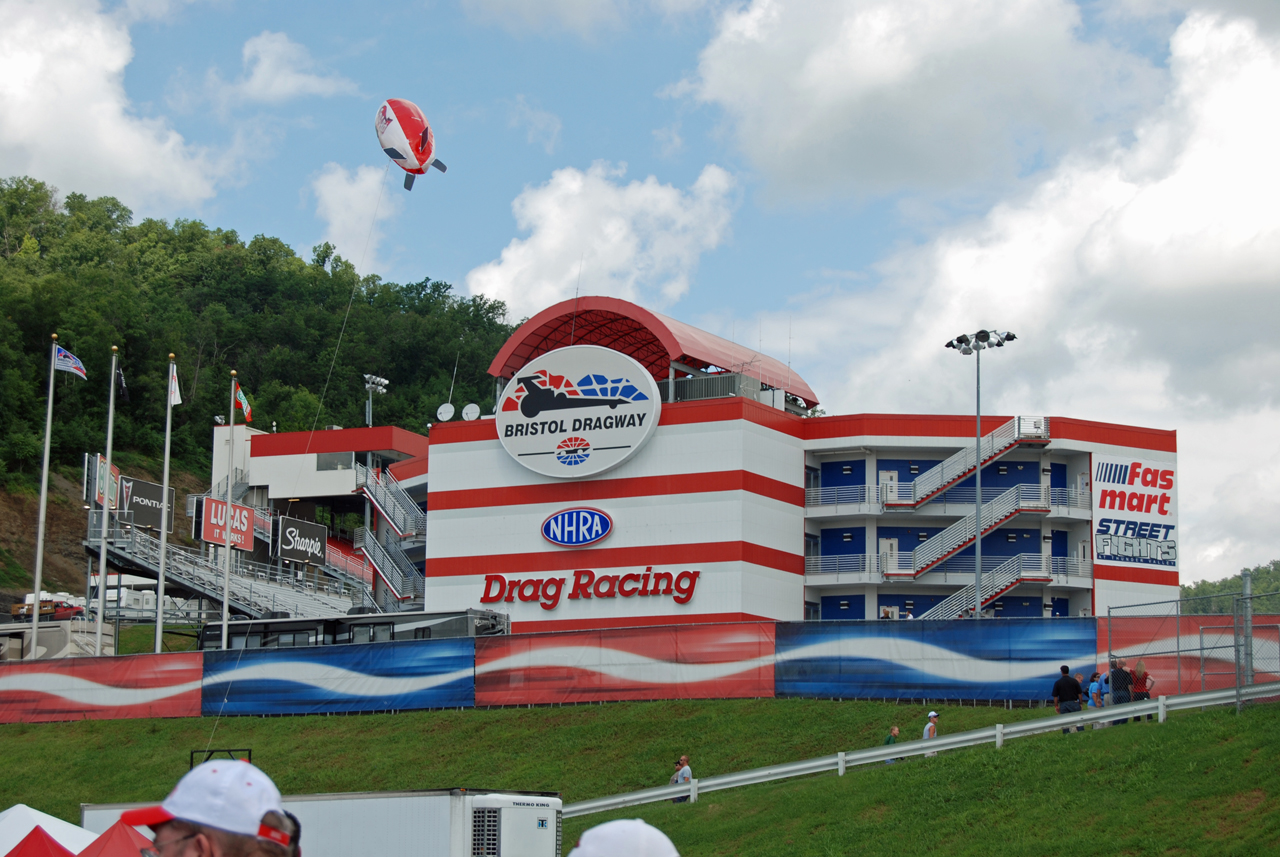
- Location: Bristol, Tennessee, United States
- Coordinates: 36.517°N 82.249°W
- Capacity: 30,000
- Owner: Speedway Motorsports
- Operator: Speedway Motorsports
- Address: 151 Speedway Blvd Ext
- Broke ground: 1965
- Major events: Current: NHRA Mission Foods Drag Racing Series; NHRA Thunder Valley Nationals

Drag Strip
- Surface: Concrete
- Length: 0.250 mi (0.402 km)

Bristol Dragway is a 30,000 capacity drag racing circuit. It is located in Bristol, Tennessee, United States. The stadium is located close to the Bristol Motor Speedway. It was originally built in 1965 and is often called "Thunder Valley" due to the acoustics created by its location between two mountains. Its track is 3,800 feet long.

== Current Track Records ==
| Category | E.T. | Speed | Driver | Event | Ref |
|---|---|---|---|---|---|
| Top Fuel | 3.667 | | Steve Torrance | 2021 NHRA Thunder Valley Nationals | |
| Top Fuel | | 336.49 mph (541.53 km/h) | Justin Ashley | 2023 NHRA Thunder Valley Nationals | |
| Funny Car | 3.884 | | Ron Capps | 2016 NHRA Thunder Valley Nationals | |
| Funny Car | | 330.31 mph (531.58 km/h) | Matt Hagan | 2021 NHRA Thunder Valley Nationals | |
| Pro Stock | 6.613 | | Greg Anderson | 2022 NHRA Thunder Valley Nationals | |
| Pro Stock | | 209.26 mph (336.77 km/h) | Bo Butner | 2016 NHRA Thunder Valley Nationals | |
| Pro Stock Motorcycle | 6.759 | | Matt Smith | 2024 Super Grip NHRA Thunder Valley Nationals | |
| Pro Stock Motorcycle | | 205.04 mph (329.98 km/h) | Matt Smith | 2024 Super Grip NHRA Thunder Valley Nationals | |
