= Matt Hagan =

American drag racing driver (born 1982)

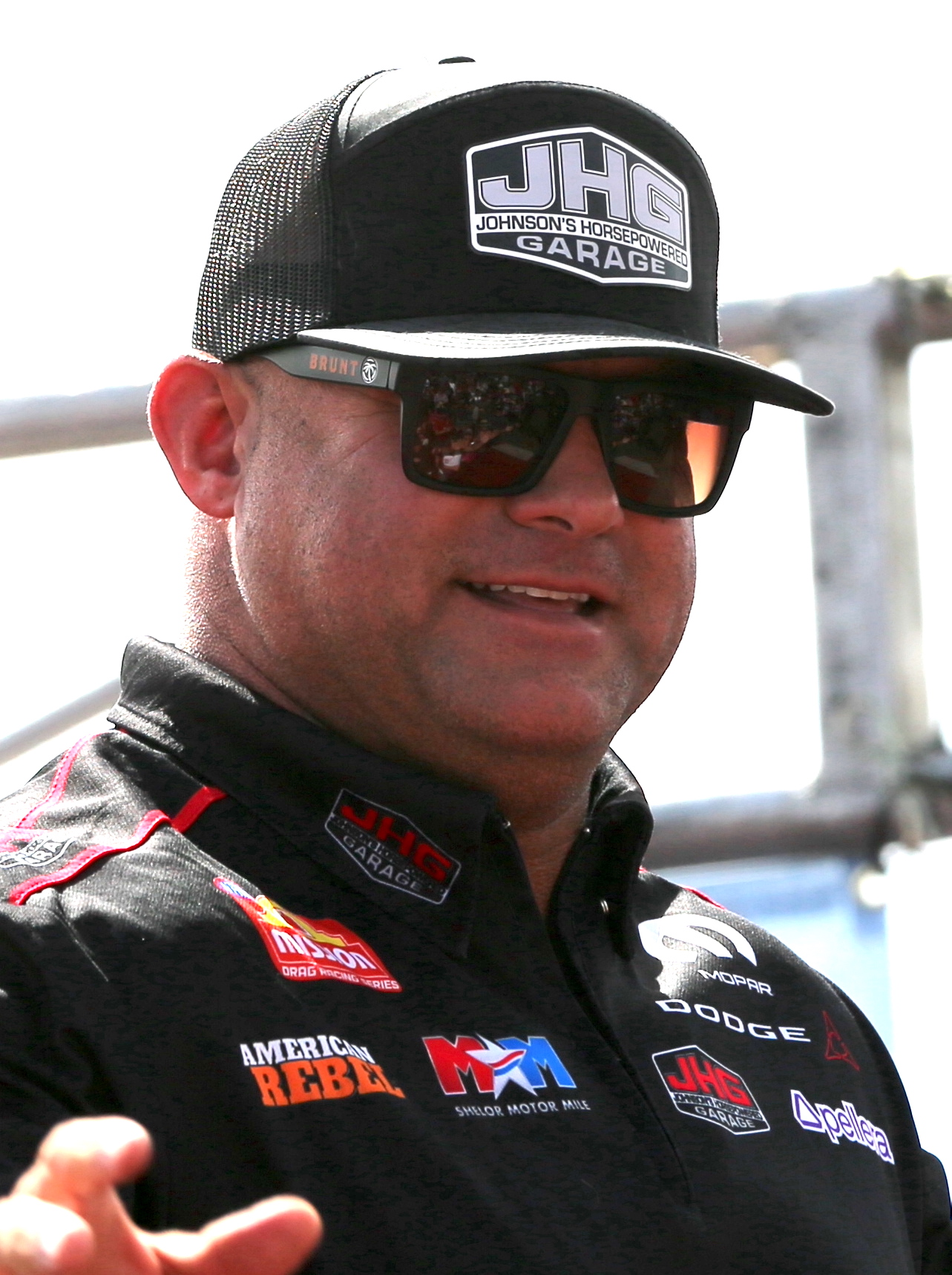
- Hagan at Sonoma Raceway in 2026
- Nationality: American
- Born: November 18, 1982 (age 43) Christiansburg, Virginia, U.S.

NHRA Mission Foods Drag Racing Series career
- Debut season: 2009
- Current team: Tony Stewart Racing
- Former teams: Don Schumacher Racing
- Championships: 4 (FC)
- Wins: 55
- Poles: 54
- Fastest laps: Best ET; 3.799 seconds; Best Speed; 338.85 mph (545.33 km/h)

Championship titles
- 2011, 2014, 2020, 2023: NHRA Funny Car Champion

Matt Hagan (born November 18, 1982) is a professional NHRA Funny Car driver in the NHRA Mission Foods Drag Racing Series for Tony Stewart Racing. Most notably, he was the 2011, 2014, 2020 and 2023 NHRA Funny Car World Champion. He has had 55 Career Event titles, as well been in 98 Career Final Rounds, and 54 Career No.1 qualifying positions in his career following the 2025 season. He is driver of the 14 Dodge Power Brokers Funny Car team led by Dickie Venables.

On October 14, 2021, Hagan was announced as the Funny Car driver for Tony Stewart Racing in 2022.

On September 1, 2017, Hagan was the second Nitro Funny Car driver to break the 3.800 E/T barrier with a 3.799@338.77MPH pass at Lucas Oil Raceway. That same pass made him the current Funny Car elapsed time record and top speed record holder at Lucas Oil Raceway.
