= Gateway Motorsports Park =

Motorsport track in Madison, Illinois, United States

World Wide Technology Raceway
"WWT Raceway" "Gateway"
- Logo (2024–present)

- Layout of the oval circuit (1997–present)
- Location: 700 Raceway Blvd, Madison, Illinois, United States, 62060
- Coordinates: 38°39′2.88″N 90°8′7.33″W
- Capacity: 57,000
- Owner: Curtis Francois (September 2011–present); Dover Motorsports (1998–November 2010); Chris Pook (1994–1998); Jody Trover (1985–1994)
- Broke ground: 1967 (former dragstrip); 1985 (former road course); 1995–1996 (oval / dragstrip); 2013 (kartplex)
- Opened: As a road course: 1985; As oval: May 1997
- Former names: St. Louis International Raceway (1967–1988); Gateway International Raceway (1988–2011); Gateway Motorsports Park (2012–2018)
- Major events: Current: NASCAR Cup Series; Enjoy Illinois 300 (2022–present); IndyCar Series; Bommarito Automotive Group 500 (2001–2003, 2017–present); NASCAR O'Reilly Auto Parts Series; Nu Way 225 (1997–2010, 2025–present); NHRA Mission Foods Drag Racing Series; NHRA Midwest Nationals (1997–2010, 2012–present); Future: ARCA Menards Series; Dutch Boy 150 (1986, 1997, 2001, 2004–2007, 2018–2020, 2027); Former: NASCAR Craftsman Truck Series; Toyota 200 (1998–2010, 2014–2024); Formula D (2018–2025); Trans-Am Series (1985, 2023–2024); NASCAR K&N Pro Series East & NASCAR K&N Pro Series West; Monaco Cocktails Gateway Classic 125 (2018–2019); AMA Superbike Championship (1995); Can-Am (1985–1986)
- Website: https://www.wwtraceway.com/

Oval (1997–present)
- Surface: Asphalt
- Length: 1.250 mi (2.012 km)
- Turns: 4
- Banking: Turn 1 & 2: 11° Turn 3 & 4: 9°
- Race lap record: 0:24.6317 ( (United States) Josef Newgarden, Dallara DW12, 2017, IndyCar)

Infield Road Course 1 (1997–present)
- Surface: Asphalt
- Length: 1.600 mi (2.575 km)
- Turns: 10
- Race lap record: 0:58.729 ( (United States) Chris Dyson, Ford Mustang Trans-Am, 2023, TA1)

Infield Road Course 2 (2019–present)
- Surface: Asphalt
- Length: 2.000 mi (3.219 km)
- Turns: 14

Drag Strip
- Surface: Asphalt
- Length: 0.250 mi (0.402 km)

Kartplex
- Surface: Asphalt
- Length: 0.89 km (0.55 mi)
- Turns: 11

Original Road Course (1985–1995)
- Length: 2.600 mi (4.184 km)
- Turns: 14
- Race lap record: 1:23.090 ( (United States) Bill Tempero, March 84C, 1986, Can-Am)

Gateway Motorsports Park (currently known as World Wide Technology Raceway for sponsorship reasons) is a motor racing facility in Madison, Illinois, United States, just east of St. Louis, close to the Gateway Arch. It features a 1.250 mi (2.012 km) oval that hosts the NASCAR Cup Series, NASCAR O'Reilly Auto Parts Series, and the IndyCar Series, 1.600 mi (2.575 km) and 2.000 mi (3.219 km) infield road courses used by Trans-Am Series, SCCA, and Porsche Club of America, a quarter-mile NHRA-sanctioned drag strip that hosts the annual NHRA Mission Foods Drag Racing Series Midwest Nationals event, and the Kartplex, a state-of-the-art karting facility.

The first major event held at the facility was the CART Series on Saturday May 24, 1997, the day before the Indy Racing League's Indianapolis 500. Rather than scheduling a race directly opposite the Indy 500 (as they had done in 1996 with the U.S. 500), CART scheduled Gateway the day before to serve as their Memorial Day weekend open-wheel alternative without direct conflict. For 2000, the race was moved to the fall. In 2001, it was dropped from the CART series schedule, and switched alliances to the Indy Racing League. After mediocre attendance, the event was dropped altogether after 2003. It was later re-added to the schedule for 2017.

In 1998, the then-named Gateway International Raceway was purchased by Dover Motorsports, a group that also owned what is now Memphis International Raceway, along with the Nashville Superspeedway and Dover International Speedway. On November 3, 2010, Dover Motorsports closed the facility. On September 8, 2011, the facility was re-opened by local St. Louis real estate developer and former Indy Lights driver Curtis Francois and renamed Gateway Motorsports Park, saving the facility days before being scrapped. Under its new leadership, World Wide Technology Raceway went from the brink of demolition to one of the very few tracks in the United States to host the NASCAR Cup Series, NTT IndyCar Series, and NHRA Drag Racing Series all during the same year. The track also hosts Formula Drift, the Lucas Oil Drag Racing Series and the Confluence Music Festival.

== Track history ==
The original road course built in 1985 was demolished by 1996 to make way for the oval track and drag strip used today.

=== Former tracks ===
St. Louis International Raceway was built in 1967 as a drag racing facility by Wayne and Ruth Meinert on property originally purchased by David Bergfield. Initially conceived as a 0.125 mi (0.201 km) drag strip, the track was extended to a full 0.250 mi (0.402 km) in 1971. Having been developed on dormant swampland that was long ago buried by the Mississippi River, the track soon adapted the nickname "The Swamp".

Throughout the 1970s, the raceway primarily held regional drag racing events. However, entering the early 1980s, the interest of adding a road racing circuit to the grounds began to mount, and in 1985 a road course was constructed by then-owner Jody Trover, featuring 2.600 mi (4.184 km) and 1.010 mi (1.625 km) configurations. The asphalt circuit had a 30 ft (9.1 m) track width, 55 pit boxes within the 880 ft (270 m) pit lane, and could officially hold 52,000 spectators. Parts of the existing drag strip were incorporated into the road course build. Coming into Turn 4 was a slight left-hander onto the drag strip's shutdown portion, and after snaking around the back half of the dragway, Turn 12 turned left onto the drag strip back towards the starting line to complete the lap. The course would welcome ARCA, IMSA, and the Trans-Am Series in its inaugural year.

Also in 1985, a 0.05 mi (0.080 km) quarter midget dirt track was established at the back right corner of the property when pulling into the facility.

In 1994, Chris Pook, promoter of the Grand Prix of Long Beach, acquired the facility for $21.5 million. The existing tracks were demolished over the course of 1995–1996 and a new oval speedway and drag strip were constructed at a cost of $25 million.

=== Current tracks ===
The 1.250 mi (2.012 km) oval is a favorite for many fans and racers alike due to the unique shape and different degrees of banking in each corner. The backstretch is confined to run parallel with Illinois Route 203, making Turns 1 & 2 a tighter radius than Turns 3 & 4. Turns 1 & 2 have similar characteristics to New Hampshire Motor Speedway while Turns 3 & 4 are similar to Phoenix Raceway. The track's egg shape mimics the legendary Darlington Raceway and Mobility Resort Motegi race tracks.

The infield of the oval track includes a road course that features a 2.000 mi (3.219 km) configuration.

=== Timeline of notable events ===
- On June 24 and June 25, 1972, Evel Knievel made a stop at the then-named St. Louis International Raceway for two motorcycle jumps. Arriving via his private plane that used the drag strip as a runway, he successfully jumped his Harley-Davidson XR-750 over 10 cars on both days.
- One of the last major events held on the original road course was Round 8 of the AMA Superbike Championship in 1995. Canadian Miguel Duhamel won the class in blistering hot conditions. The near triple-digit heat wave triggered local heat advisories which majorly impacted attendance.
- In 1997, CART, the NASCAR Busch Series, and the NHRA would all be newcomers to the revitalized Gateway International Raceway.
- Before the 1999 racing season, Gateway installed the now-named Wallace Grandstand in turns 1 & 2 of the oval track to increase seating capacity. The grandstand is named in honor of the Wallace family's trio of racing brothers who were born and raised in the St. Louis region—Rusty, Mike, and Kenny.
- Metallica's Summer Sanitarium Tour made a stop at Gateway on July 3, 2000. Other artists featured at the concert were Korn, Kid Rock, Powerman 5000 & System of a Down.
- The 2004 NHRA event was marked by tragedy as Top Fuel driver Darrell Russell was killed in a second round crash. Russell had qualified at the No. 1 position for the second time in his career just the day before. One of the drag strip grandstands is named "The Darrell Russell Stand" in his memory.
- In early January 2008, it was announced that the Missouri-Illinois Dodge Dealers would move their sponsorship from the NASCAR Craftsman Truck race to the NASCAR Nationwide Series race, and was called the Missouri-Illinois Dodge Dealers 250. At the 2008 event, Carl Edwards became the fourth driver to win two NASCAR Nationwide Series events at Gateway.
- 2008 marked a big year for the NHRA Midwest Nationals event at Gateway as legendary 16-time Funny Car Champion John Force secured his 1,000th competitive round win by defeating Ron Capps in the first round. Force accomplished the feat on his 59th birthday, making the milestone doubly special.
- The 2008 NASCAR Camping World Truck Series race at Gateway was sponsored by Camping World, becoming the Camping World 200. Coincidentally, the race was won by defending Truck Series champion Ron Hornaday Jr. driving the No. 33 Camping World-sponsored truck for Kevin Harvick Inc.
- On the last lap of the July installment of the 2010 Nationwide Series race, during the height of their rivalry, Carl Edwards turned Brad Keselowski coming out of Turn 4 onto the front-stretch to take the checkered flag. Edwards was penalized 60 points and fined $25,000.
- In 2010, Gateway received a second Nationwide Series race due to the closure of Memphis Motorsports Park. The date was the former late fall event at Memphis. This was the last NASCAR event held at Gateway until 2014, as Dover Motorsports announced it would not seek sanctioning for the three events held at the track in 2010. The facility made no announcements concerning any of the other track's events. The former Nashville Superspeedway received Gateway's place on the schedule in July, while the race date for October would still be vacant. The NHRA also did not schedule any races at Gateway for its 2011 season.
- On November 3, 2010, Dover Motorsports announced that Gateway was officially closing and ceasing all racing operations. On September 8, 2011, it was officially announced that Gateway would re-open in 2012 and host the 15th AAA Insurance NHRA Midwest Nationals from September 28–30, under the leadership of Curtis Francois. On December 6, 2012, USAC announced that the track would have a USAC Traxxas Silver Crown Series date in 2013 on June 1.
- In February 2013, Francois announced the hiring of Chris Blair as executive vice president and general manager. Plans were announced for the addition of a world class karting facility (which opened as the Gateway Kartplex in June 2014), an off-road venue (which opened in May 2015 with a TORC Series event) and a revitalization plan for the track's road course.
- On May 1, 2013, Curtis Francois finalized the purchase of Gateway Motorsports Park, officially making the facility locally owned and operated.
- On October 25, 2013, it was announced that the NASCAR Craftsman Truck Series would be returning to Gateway on June 14, 2014, for the first time since 2010. Bubba Wallace won the first NASCAR event under the track's new ownership.
- In October 2016, for the first time since the 2003 season, it was announced that the NTT IndyCar Series would be returning to Gateway on August 26, 2017, for the Bommarito Automotive Group 500. After IndyCar Series teams experienced issues with the surface during a May 2, 2017 open test on the oval, track officials undertook a multimillion-dollar renovation of the racing surface. The repaving project began June 19 and was completed in late July 2017.
- On April 17, 2019, World Wide Technology announced it had acquired naming rights for the track, renaming it to World Wide Technology Raceway.
- On June 26, 2019, a 2.000 mi (3.219 km) configuration of the road course was completed that utilizes Turns 1 & 2 of the oval track. This added stretch of track was constructed directly in front of the Wallace Grandstand and its inception was partially created as a new course for Formula Drift and the SpeedTour TransAm Series.
- In late December 2019, WWT Raceway purchased the adjacent Gateway National Golf Links, a 7,178-yard links-style golf course.
- On August 21, 2021, due to the success of the event, it was announced before the green flag of the Bommarito Automotive Group 500 that the NTT IndyCar Series would be returning to the track for a renewed five-year contract. The 2021 edition also saw former F1 competitor Romain Grosjean make his first ever career oval track start. His debut attempt would result in a 14th-place finish in the Dale Coyne Racing w/ Rick Ware Racing #51 Honda, respectively.
- On September 15, 2021, it was announced WWT Raceway would be added to the NASCAR Cup Series schedule for the very first time for the 2022 season. Five thousand ticket deposits were placed within the first 24 hours of the announcement. The inaugural event was secured into the NASCAR Cup Series schedule for June 5, 2022. On March 14, 2022, the Illinois Office of Tourism was announced as the official sponsor of the event, naming the race the Enjoy Illinois 300. On June 1, 2022, WWT Raceway officially announced a capacity crowd sellout for the event, a first in track history.
- Soon after being awarded a NASCAR Cup Series date for the 2022 season, another $40 million worth of upgrades will be dedicated to the facility. One of the first enhancements was extending the Steel And Foam Energy Reduction (SAFER) barriers down a large length of the oval track's backstretch wall. A request by NASCAR, this improvement meant the originally constructed "bump out" fencing down the back straightaway would be replaced with a swing gate, making the backstretch wall continuous. Other upgrades include a complete modernization of the oval track tower's rooftop and suites, addition of infield camping sites, rejuvenated team areas, and remodeling of concession and midway spaces. The projects will occur in phases and are scheduled for completion by early 2025.
- At the conclusion of qualifying for the 2022 edition of the Bommarito Automotive Group 500, Will Power earned his 67th IndyCar pole position, tying him for most all-time with Mario Andretti. Josef Newgarden won the main event for a third time in a row—fourth time overall.
- On April 20, 2023, the Gateway Garage Experience was announced as the latest infield enhancement before the 2023 NASCAR Cup Series event. Directly located in-between the pit road and garage area, the Gateway Garage Experience provides fans an up-close look at teams with their drivers both in preparation and during the race.
- At the conclusion of the 2023 Bommarito Automotive Group 500, Scott Dixon won the race by a 22.2256 second margin of victory, shattering the previous record held by Juan Pablo Montoya with an 11.804 second margin of victory in 2000.
- During round 1 of the 2024 Enjoy Illinois 300 qualifying session on June 1, 2024, Michael McDowell set a new NASCAR Cup Series track record with a 32.318s (139.241 mph) lap time.
- On August 29, 2024, it was announced that the track's NASCAR date would move from June to September and now be in the Round of 16 for the NASCAR Cup Series Playoffs. The NASCAR Xfinity Series will also make its return to the track in 2025 for the first time since 2010.

== Track records ==
=== Qualifying and race records ===
- NASCAR Cup Series qualifying: (United States) Michael McDowell, 32.318 s (139.241 mph), June 1, 2024
- NASCAR Cup Series Race: (United States) Austin Cindric, 2 h 48 min 3 s (97.965 mph), June 2, 2024
- NASCAR O'Reilly Auto Parts Series qualifying: (United States) Connor Zilisch, 32.935 s (136.633 mph), September 6, 2025
- NASCAR O'Reilly Auto Parts Series Race: (United States) Carl Edwards, 2 h 5 min 54 s (119.142 mph), July 29, 2006
- NASCAR Craftsman Truck Series Qualifying: (United States) Grant Enfinger, 32.405 s (138.867 mph), 2018
- NASCAR Craftsman Truck Series Race: (United States) Jack Sprague, 1 h 45 min 31 s
- NHRA Camping World Drag Racing Series fastest speed: (United States) Brittany Force (Top Fuel, 340.47 mph) September 26, 2025
- SCCA Formula Atlantic overall: (United States) Hans Peter, 53.635, March 29, 2008
- Championship Auto Racing Teams Race: (Colombia) Juan Pablo Montoya, 1 h 55 min 38 s (155.519 mph), September 17, 2000
- IndyCar single-lap record: (Australia) Will Power (189.709 mph) August 25, 2017
- IndyCar two-lap qualifying average: (Australia) Will Power (189.642 mph) August 25, 2017

=== Race lap records ===
As of September 2025, the fastest official race lap records at World Wide Technology Raceway (formerly St. Louis International Raceway) are listed as:

| Category | Time | Driver | Vehicle | Event |
Oval (1997–present): 1.250 mi (2.012 km)
| IndyCar | 0:24.6317 | Josef Newgarden | Dallara DW12 | 2017 Bommarito Automotive Group 500 |
| CART | 0:25.312 | Dario Franchitti | Reynard 97I | 1997 Motorola 300 |
| Indy NXT | 0:27.7521 | Caio Collet | Dallara IL-15 | 2025 Indy NXT by Firestone Outfront Showdown |
| Formula Atlantic | 0:30.086 | Case Montgomery | Swift 008.a | 2000 Gateway Formula Atlantic round |
| USAC Silver Crown | 0:30.900 | Kody Swanson | Silver Crown Car | 2022 Outfront 100 |
| Indy Pro 2000 | 0:31.4483 | Kory Enders | Tatuus PM-18 | 2019 Gateway Indy Pro 2000 round |
| NASCAR Truck | 0:32.815 | Noah Gragson | Toyota Tundra | 2018 Eaton 200 |
| NASCAR Cup | 0:32.944 | Denny Hamlin | Toyota Camry XSE | 2025 Enjoy Illinois 300 |
| NASCAR Xfinity | 0:33.492 | Connor Zilisch | Chevrolet Camaro SS | 2025 Nu Way 200 |
Infield Road Course 1 (1997–present): 1.600 mi (2.575 km)
| TA1 | 0:58.729 | Chris Dyson | Ford Mustang Trans-Am | 2023 Gateway Trans-Am round |
| TA2 | 1:00.512 | Ben Maier | Ford Mustang Trans-Am | 2024 Gateway Trans-Am TA2 round |
Original Road Course (1985–1996): 2.600 mi (4.184 km)
| Can-Am | 1:23.090 | Bill Tempero | March 84C | 1986 St. Louis Can-Am round |
| Trans-Am | 1:30.110 | Willy T. Ribbs | Mercury Capri | 1985 St. Louis Trans-Am round |

=== Drag strip records ===
| Category | E.T. | Speed | Driver | Event | Ref |
|---|---|---|---|---|---|
| Top Fuel | 3.631 | | Clay Millican | 2017 AAA Insurance NHRA Midwest Nationals | |
| Top Fuel | | 340.47 mph (547.93 km/h) | Brittany Force | 2025 NAPA Auto Parts NHRA Midwest Nationals | |
| Funny Car | 3.814 | | Austin Prock | 2024 NHRA Midwest Nationals | |
| Funny Car | | 338.60 mph (544.92 km/h) | Robert Hight | 2017 AAA Insurance NHRA Midwest Nationals | |
| Pro Stock | 6.492 | | Greg Anderson | 2015 AAA Insurance NHRA Midwest Nationals | |
| Pro Stock | | 213.47 mph (343.55 km/h) | Jason Line | 2012 AAA Insurance NHRA Midwest Nationals | |
| Pro Stock Motorcycle | 6.701 | | Gaige Herrera | 2023 NHRA Midwest Nationals | |
| Pro Stock Motorcycle | | 203.40 mph (327.34 km/h) | Matt Smith | 2023 NHRA Midwest Nationals | |

== Race history ==
=== NHRA Mission Foods Drag Racing Series results ===
| Season | Top fuel | Funny car | Pro stock | Pro stock motorcycle | Pro stock truck |
|---|---|---|---|---|---|
| 1997 | Joe Amato | Ron Capps | Warren Johnson | Jon Smith | |
| 1998 | Gary Scelzi | Frank Pedregon | Kurt Johnson | Matt Hines | Tim Freeman |
| 1999 | Gary Scelzi | John Force | Jim Yates | Angelle Sampey | Bob Panella |
| 2000 | Gary Scelzi | Jerry Toliver | Ron Krisher | Matt Hines | John Coughlin |
| 2001 | Doug Kalitta | Tony Pedregon | Warren Johnson | GT Tonglet | Taylor Lastor |
| 2002 | Kenny Bernstein | John Force | Jeg Coughlin Jr. | Angelle Sampey | |
| 2003 | Doug Kalitta | Del Worsham | Ron Krisher | Geno Scali | |
| 2004 | Doug Kalitta | Gary Scelzi | Greg Anderson | Steve Johnson | |
| 2005 | Brandon Bernstein | Ron Capps | Kurt Johnson | Angelle Sampey | |
| 2006 | Tony Schumacher | Tony Pedregon | Mike Edwards | Chip Ellis | |
| 2007 | Melanie Troxel | Ron Capps | Dave Connolly | Matt Smith | |
| 2008 | Rod Fuller | Tim Wilkerson | Kurt Johnson | Andrew Hines | |
| 2009 | Antron Brown | Del Worsham | Jeg Coughlin Jr. | Eddie Krawiec | |
| 2010 | Tony Schumacher | Robert Hight | Warren Johnson | Michael Phillips | |
| 2011 | Event not held. | | | | |
| 2012 | Antron Brown | Jack Beckman | Erica Enders | Eddie Krawiec | |
| 2013 | Antron Brown | John Force | Erica Enders | Matt Smith | |
| 2014 | Antron Brown | Courtney Force | Dave Connolly | Jerry Savoie | |
| 2015 | Antron Brown | Del Worsham | Drew Skillman | Hector Arana Jr. | |
| 2016 | Shawn Langdon | Jack Beckman | Alex Laughlin | Jerry Savoie | |
| 2017 | Steve Torrence | Ron Capps | Greg Anderson | LE Tonglet | |
| 2018 | Steve Torrence | Robert Hight | Tanner Gray | Matt Smith | |
| 2019 | Billy Torrence | Shawn Langdon | Erica Enders | Karen Stoffer | |
| 2020 | Doug Kalitta | Tommy Johnson Jr | Erica Enders | Matt Smith | |
| 2021 | Steve Torrence | Matt Hagan | Erica Enders | | |
| 2022 | Steve Torrence | Robert Hight | Erica Enders | Matt Smith | |
| 2023 | Clay Millican | Matt Hagan | Greg Anderson | Gaige Herrera | |
| 2024 | Tony Schumacher | Jack Beckman | Dallas Glenn | Gaige Herrera | |
| 2025 | Doug Kalitta | Matt Hagan | Greg Anderson | Gaige Herrera | |

== Annual events ==
=== Current events ===
- June: IndyCar Series Bommarito Automotive Group 500, Indy NXT Indy NXT by Firestone Outfront Showdown, USAC Silver Crown Series
- July: Formula Drift
- September: NASCAR Cup Series Enjoy Illinois 300, NASCAR O'Reilly Auto Parts Series Nu Way 225, NHRA Mission Foods Drag Racing Series NHRA Midwest Nationals
- October: NHRA Lucas Oil Drag Racing Series

=== Future events ===
- ARCA Menards Series
  - Dutch Boy 150 (1986, 1997, 2001, 2004–2007, 2018–2020, 2027)

=== Former events ===
- AMA Superbike Championship (1995)
- American Indycar Series (1988, 1990)
- Americas Rallycross Championship (2019)
- ARCA Midwest Tour
  - Illinois Lottery 40 (2016–2017)
- ASA National Tour (2000)
- ASA Late Model Series (2008–2009)
- Atlantic Championship Series (1998–2000)
- Can-Am (1985–1986)
- Indy Pro 2000 Championship
  - St. Louis Pro Mazda Oval Challenge (2017–2022)
- NASCAR Craftsman Truck Series
  - Toyota 200 presented by CK Power (1998–2010, 2014–2024)
- NASCAR K&N Pro Series East & West
  - Monaco Cocktails Gateway Classic 125 (2018–2019)
- NASCAR Midwest Series (1997–2003)
- NASCAR Southeast Series (1999)
- TORC: The Off-Road Championship (2015)
- Trans-Am Series (1985, 2023–2024)
- USAC Silver Crown Champ Car Series (1997–2001, 2013–2014, 2016, 2022)

=== Confluence Music Festival ===
The Confluence Music Festival is an annual multi-day event during the NASCAR Cup Series race weekend, featuring acclaimed and local artists.

| Year | Headlining artists |
|---|---|
| 2022 | Nelly, Old Dominion, Cole Swindell, Jimmie Allen |
| 2023 | Dierks Bentley, Flo Rida, Brothers Osborne, Bailey Zimmerman |
| 2024 | Ludacris, T-Pain, Riley Green, Adam Wainwright, Big & Rich with Gretchen Wilson |

=== Other events ===
During the winter months after the racing season concludes, World Wide Technology Raceway's oval track infield transforms into the WonderLight's drive-through Christmas light display.

== See also ==
- List of NASCAR race tracks
