= Memphis International Raceway =

Motorsport track in the United States

Darana Motorsports Park Millington
- D-oval (1998–2022)
- Location: 5500 Victory Lane, Millington, Tennessee, 38053
- Coordinates: 35°16′58″N 89°56′51″W
- Capacity: 35,000 (Oval) - 25,000 (Drag Strip)
- Owner: International Hot Rod Association (December 2025–present); IRG Sports & Entertainment; Palm Beach International Raceway (2011–2022); Dover Motorsports (July 1998–December 2010); Grand Prix Association of Long Beach (1996–1998); Ed Gatlin (1986–1995)
- Opened: 1986; Re-opening: Planned in 2026
- Closed: 17 June 2022; 4 years ago
- Former names: Memphis International Raceway (1986–May 1998, April 2011–June 2022); Memphis Motorsports Park (June 1998–March 2011)
- Major events: Current: IHRA (2011–2022, 2026); Former: ARCA Menards Series; Sioux Chief PowerPEX 200 (1998, 2001, 2020); NASCAR Nationwide Series; Kroger On Track for the Cure 250 (1999–2009); NASCAR Camping World Truck Series; MemphisTravel.com 200 (1998–2009); NASCAR K&N Pro Series East (2017–2019); NHRA Full Throttle Drag Racing Series (1988–2009); AMA Superbike Championship (1987); Trans-Am (1987); Atlantic Championship (1987)

D-oval (1998–2022)
- Surface: Asphalt
- Length: 0.750 mi (1.207 km)
- Banking: Turns - 11° Straights - 4° front, 3° back

Drag Strip
- Surface: Asphalt
- Length: 0.833 mi (1.340 km)

Road Course (1987–1998)
- Surface: Asphalt
- Length: 1.770 mi (2.848 km)
- Race lap record: 1:05.692 ( (United States) Pete Halsmer, Merkur XR4Ti, 1987, Trans-Am)

Darana Motorsports Park Millington (formerly known as Memphis International Raceway and Memphis Motorsports Park) is an auto racing park located near the Loosahatchie River in Shelby County, Tennessee, United States, approximately 10 mi (16 km) south of Millington, and a few miles north of the city of Memphis.

== History ==
The Memphis International Raceway (more commonly known as MIR) was founded in 1986 by Ed Gatlin, who along with a group of investors, bought a 400-acre tract of land within the northeastern section of Shelby County, and built a drag strip with an adjacent road course, including a dirt track and a go-kart track. The facility opened in 1987 with a drag strip and 1.770 mi (2.849 km) road course. It includes a 0.750 mi (1.207 km) tri-oval short track, built in 1998, which once hosted the NASCAR Nationwide Series and NASCAR Camping World Truck Series, as well as an ASA Late Model Series race. The 4,400 ft (1,340 m) drag strip hosts events such as International Hot Rod Association (IHRA) World Finals and Nitro Jam, Professional Drag Racers Association (PDRA), HOT ROD Power Tour, Super Chevy Show, Fun Ford Series and Mega Mopar Action Series.

The entire facility was purchased by the Grand Prix Association of Long Beach in 1996, and in 1997, a 0.750 mi (1.207 km) paved tri-oval was added on the site of the old dirt track, while a new dirt track was built on the site of the former go-kart track. The name of the facility was also changed to Memphis Motorsports Park and the tri-oval opened on June 5, 1998.

The following month, Memphis Motorsports Park was acquired by Dover Motorsports in connection with its purchase of the Grand Prix Association of Long Beach. Memphis Motorsports Park closed October 30, 2009, due to lack of finances. Its parent company, Dover Motorsports, Inc. announced that it was ceasing all operations at Memphis Motorsports Park and that it would not be promoting any events in Memphis in 2010. The Memphis facility was under an agreement of sale to Gulf Coast Entertainment but Gulf Coast was unable to secure financing. The track's Camping World Truck Series date was moved to Nashville Superspeedway and its Nationwide Series date to Gateway International Raceway, and later abandoned after a year. Dover Motorsports, Inc. auctioned off the complex on December 14, 2010, to Palm Beach International Raceway for $1.9 million.

=== Palm Beach International years ===
It was announced on January 31, 2011, that the deal between Palm Beach International and Dover Motorsports was finalized, and the track re-opened in April 2011. The track was also renamed to Memphis International Raceway, and a new logo was created to reflected the change which adopted a similar theme with its sister track in Palm Beach. The track became sanctioned with IHRA, which has held the IHRA Nitro Jam finale at Memphis since 2011.

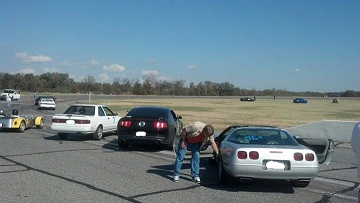
Picture of a NASA Autocross in November 2012 at Memphis International Raceway.

In 2013, MIR gained more events for the park, including the 2nd annual Ford Fun Weekend at Memphis (was hosted at MIR in 2012 as well), and the Mega Mopar Action Series. This was the first year where the three major domestic manufacturers (Chevy, Ford, and Dodge) held an event at Memphis in the same year under the new owners. The track also drew attention to the Mid South Region of NASA, which uses the road course for track events featuring High Performance Driving Events (HPDEs), Time Trial, Wheel to Wheel Racing, and NASA-X autocross events.

Retired NASCAR driver, Rusty Wallace opened up his driving experience and go kart facility on the NASCAR Oval in May 2013. MIR also picked up the Xtreme Xperience Supercar venue which allows anyone to drive vehicles such as Ferrari's, Lamborghini's, and Audi's around the track for a fee. Its first event was February 9 and 10, but the event was prematurely canceled on the 10th due to weather. A make-up event was rescheduled for a Sunday run on October 20, 2013. The ARCA series also made a return to the oval, making it the first racing event held on the oval since the new ownership in 2011. The Memphis 250 was held on October 26 with Brian Campbell being the race winner.

The track was sold sometime around March 2022 and held its last event on June 17, 2022; as of June 2025, 3 years after its last event, the track (including the drag strip and paved oval) currently sits abandoned.

=== IHRA reopening ===
As was the case with Atlanta Dragway, the new International Hot Rod Association, now owned by Darana Hybrid electrical-mechanical contractor owner Darryl H. Cuttell, has been eyeing the property as an acquisition for the 2026 season. In November 2025, it was reported by the drag racing Web site Competition Plus that both Memphis and Commerce are being considered for the 1/8 mile drag racing series in 2026. The December 2025 issue of the sanctioning body's Drag Review magazine showed the Millington circuit was a contracted track.

On November 25, 2025, the IHRA announced a Perimeter Chassis Late Model series that would participate on the Memphis oval in October 2026.

On December 11, 2025, during the Performance Racing Industry motorsport trade show in Indianapolis, the IHRA announced Memphis will host numerous IHRA events, including the IHRA Sportsman Finals from October 22–24, 2026 and the IHRA Outlaw Nitro Series Finals from November 5–7, 2026.

On December 23, 2025, the IHRA announced the acquisition of the circuit has closed and reconstruction would commence in 2026.

== Tracks ==
=== Drag strip ===
The drag strip immediately drew the attention of the NHRA and was awarded a sanction in 1988 as the host site of the Mid-South Nationals. While the NHRA has 140 member tracks, Memphis was one of only 23 to host a national event. It also was the section of the complex used by other events such as the Mid-South SCCA events and the Super Chevy Show. The last NHRA race at Memphis, O’Reilly NHRA Mid-South Nationals, was to be hosted on October 4, 2009, but a rain delay postponed the event to October 5, 2009. In the winner's circle were Jeff Arend (Funny Car), Morgan Lucas (Top Fuel), Jason Line (Pro Stock) and Michael Phillips (Pro Stock Motorcycle).

The strip will host IHRA events with its new owner, including a Nitro Jam event, as their sister track in Palm Beach is also affiliated with IHRA. The American Drag Racing League announced, on March 3, 2011, that they would hold an event during the weekend of May 20, 2011, at MIR. The IHRA Nitro Jam series continues to race at Memphis, and have set up another finale event for 2014.

The 2026 IHRA races will only be held for 1/8 mile racing.

=== Paved oval ===
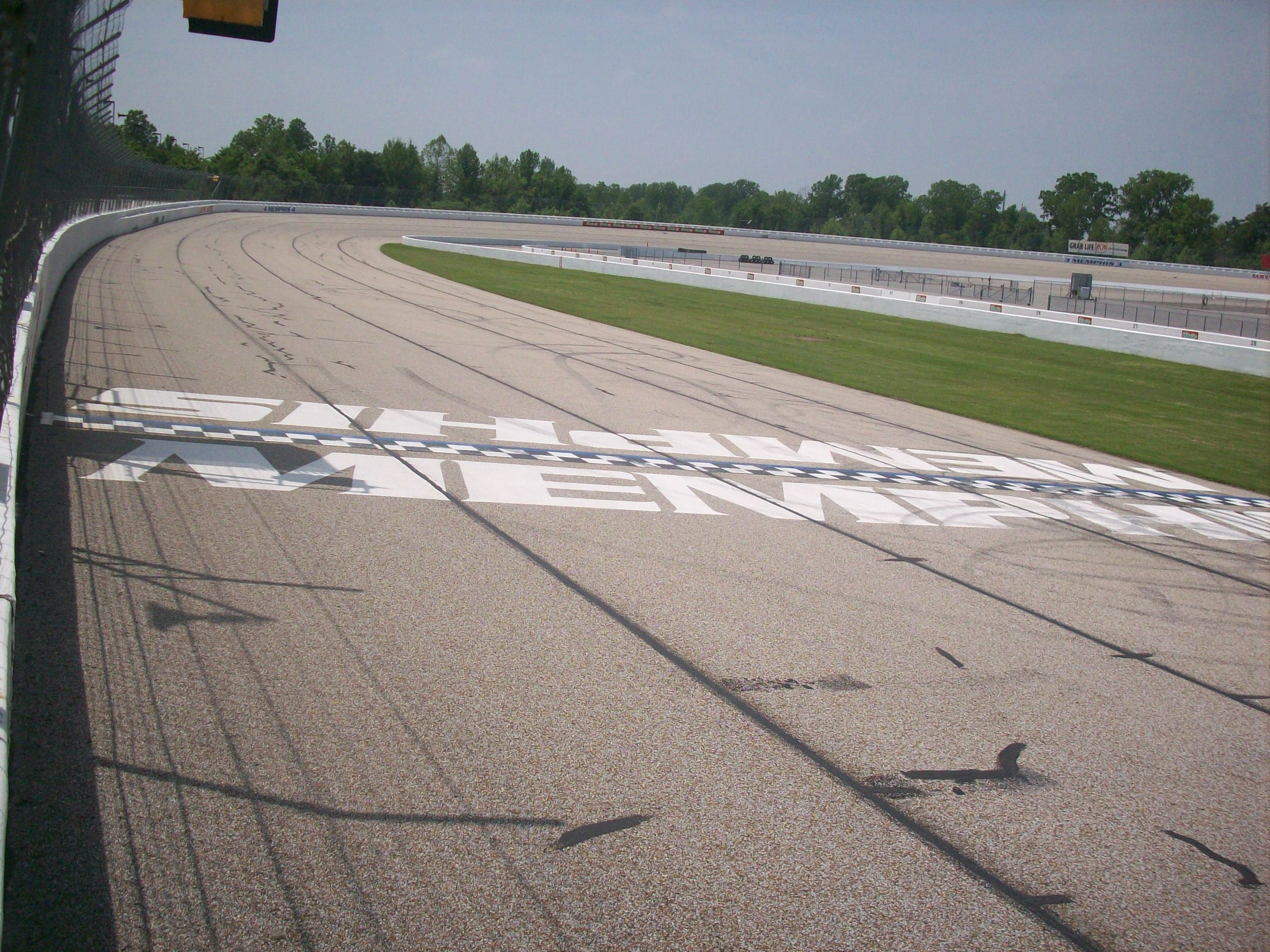
Start-finish line of the NASCAR oval

On September 13, 1998, before a sold-out crowd and a national television audience, the facility hosted its first NASCAR event—the NASCAR Craftsman Truck Series Memphis 200. NASCAR returned every year since with two events—the Truck Series in the summer, and the Nationwide Series in the fall. Ron Hornaday took home his second consecutive Elvis trophy in the last MemphisTravel.com 200 Camping World Truck Series race held at the oval. A late caution forced a green-white-checkered finish which gave Hornaday the edge on the restart to beat Brian Scott. On October 24, 2009, Brad Keselowski won the race at the oval by holding off Kyle Busch to the finish line on the 11th and final annual racing event, for both the Nationwide Series and the oval, as the track would not carry any racing events in 2010, when Dover Motorsports, Inc. announced the closure of Memphis Motorsports Park, a week after that race.

== Records ==
Series	Driver	Car	Date	Speed	Time	Layout
ARCA CRA Super Series	Derek Griffin	Chevrolet SS	October 26, 2013	124.804 miles per hour (200.85 km/h)	21.634	NASCAR Oval
NASCAR Busch Qualifying	Jeff Green	Chevrolet Monte Carlo	October 28, 2000	120.267 miles per hour (193.55 km/h)	22.450	NASCAR Oval
NASCAR Busch Race	Kevin Harvick	Chevrolet Monte Carlo	October 28, 2000	92.352 miles per hour (148.63 km/h)	2:01:49	NASCAR Oval
NASCAR Camping World Qualifying	Greg Biffle	Ford F-150	June 24, 1999	120.139 miles per hour (193.34 km/h)		NASCAR Oval
NASCAR Camping World Race	Travis Kvapil	Ford F-150	June 30, 2007	91.806 miles per hour (147.75 km/h)	1:38:02	NASCAR Oval
NHRA Top Fuel ET*	Brandon Bernstein	Hemi Powered Top Fuel	September 2008		3.825	Drag Strip
NHRA Top Fuel MPH*	Brandon Bernstein	Hemi Powered Top Fuel	September 2008	313.88 miles per hour (505.14 km/h)		Drag Strip
NHRA Funny Car ET*	Tim Wilkerson	Ford Mustang	August 2016		4.050	Drag Strip
NHRA Funny Car MPH*	Del Worsham	Toyota Camry	August 2016	316.81 miles per hour (509.86 km/h)		Drag Strip
NHRA Pro Stock ET	Allen Johnson	Dodge Stratus R/T	September 2008		6.591	Drag Strip
NHRA Pro Stock MPH	Greg Anderson	Pontiac GXP	September 2007	209.17 miles per hour (336.63 km/h)		Drag Strip
NHRA Pro Stock Bike ET	Chip Ellis	Suzuki Pro Stock Bike	September 2007		6.892	Drag Strip
NHRA Pro Stock Bike MPH	Chip Ellis	Suzuki Pro Stock Bike	September 2007	193.21 miles per hour (310.94 km/h)		Drag Strip

*Top Fuel and Funny Car based on 333 yards 1 foot (304.80 m) records under current NHRA regulations. Pro Stock and Pro Stock Motorcycle are still 440 yards (402.34 m).

== Events ==
Current

- October: International Hot Rod Association IHRA Sportsman Finals
- November: International Hot Rod Association IHRA Outlaw Nitro Series Finals

Former

- AMA Superbike Championship (1987)
- ARCA Menards Series
  - Sioux Chief PowerPEX 200 (1998, 2001, 2020)
- ASA National Tour (1999–2002)
- Atlantic Championship Series (1987)
- Global Rallycross (2017)
- NASCAR Camping World Truck Series
  - MemphisTravel.com 200 (1998–2009)
- NASCAR K&N Pro Series East
  - Memphis 150 (2017–2019)
- NASCAR Nationwide Series
  - Kroger On Track for the Cure 250 (1999–2009)
- NASCAR Southeast Series (1998–2002)
- NHRA Full Throttle Drag Racing Series (1988–2009)
- National Auto Sport Association (2011–2021)
- Trans-Am Series (1987)
- X-1R Pro Cup Series (2014)

== See also ==
- List of NASCAR race tracks
