= Dale Armstrong =

Canadian drag racer and crew chief

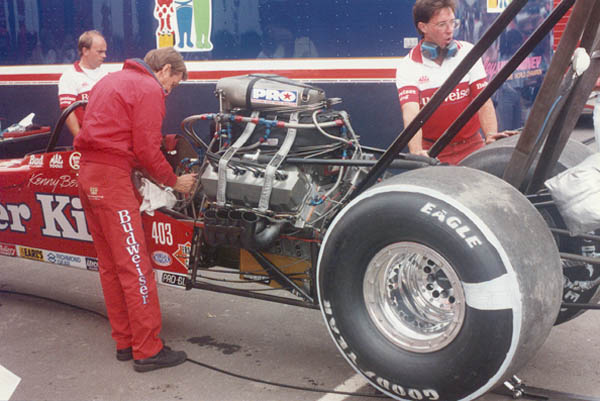
Armstrong (left) working on Kenny Bernstein's car

Dale Armstrong (1941 – November 28, 2014) was a Canadian drag racer and crew chief. After winning 12 National Hot Rod Association (NHRA) and 12 International Hot Rod Association (IHRA) events in the 1970s, including the Pro Comp title in 1975, he became Kenny Bernstein's crew chief. The combination produced four consecutive national championships in Funny Car (1985 to 1988) and another in Top Fuel. Bernstein became the first driver to top the 300 miles per hour mark in an engine tuned by Armstrong. Armstrong has been inducted in numerous halls of fame. He died on November 28, 2014, at his home in Temecula, California, at the age of 73. He had sarcoidosis.

== Career ==
Armstrong was born in Holden, Alberta, in 1941. He bought his first car, a 1936 Ford Coupe, for five dollars at age 14. In 1957, he began drag racing the car on a dragstrip at an airport near Calgary. It took him five attempts to make a 60-mile-per-hour (97 km/h) pass; he took out non-essential pieces of the car such as the back seat to lighten the load. His reputation for repairing cars quickly grew and soon there were cars lined up for repairs behind his family's garage. He began drag racing in NHRA's Northwest division in a Chevrolet Z-11 in the B/Factory Experimental class in a front-ended machine that had 11-second passes at 115 miles per hour (185 km/h). Armstrong and a friend towed his dragster to Southern California for the February 1964 Winternationals. In January 1965, he moved to Southern California and began campaigning a Chevrolet II at local tracks since he could compete up to five nights per week. He converted the car into a Funny Car and began running the car in early 1966 using the nickname "The Canuck". The car appeared on the cover of Hot Rod Magazine in December 1966; the article in the magazine said "Even a diehard Chevy lover would have trouble telling just what had been the original vehicle". The supercharged engine achieved runs in the 8-second bracket with a top elapsed time (e.t.) of 8.89 seconds. In 1969 he drove a Chevrolet Camaro in the Super Stock class and he followed it up with making passes in Funny Cars "Travelin' Javelin" and Tom Strum's Swapper.

Armstrong switched to the Injected Funny Car class in a 1973 Barracuda before moving to the new Pro Comp class in 1974. He joined Ken Veney's team and beat Veney in the finals of his first A/Fuel event at the Winternationals. He also won the AA/Altered U.S. Nationals for Jim Foust that season before moving to Pro Comp in 1975. While competing in Foust's Alcoholic BB/Funny Car, he won the Pro Comp championship including wins in the U.S. Nationals and Worlds. Armstrong continued racing in Pro Comp for three more years. During that time, he won eight more National events including the 1977 U.S. Nationals. In 1976, he won seven of nine IHRA Pro Comp National events and the championship.

Armstrong moved to Funny Car in 1980 and 1981 and had three final-round loses. He used Mike Kase's Dodge Omni at the 1981 World Finals to set a national record with a 5.891 second pass to break Bernstein's 5.90 mark. During the 1981 season, he had two accidents. Armstrong described the fiery 240 mph crash of his Dodge Challenger at Columbus, Ohio: "Yeah, that was kind of a bad one," he said. "It told me it was time to get out of driving."

=== Crew chief ===
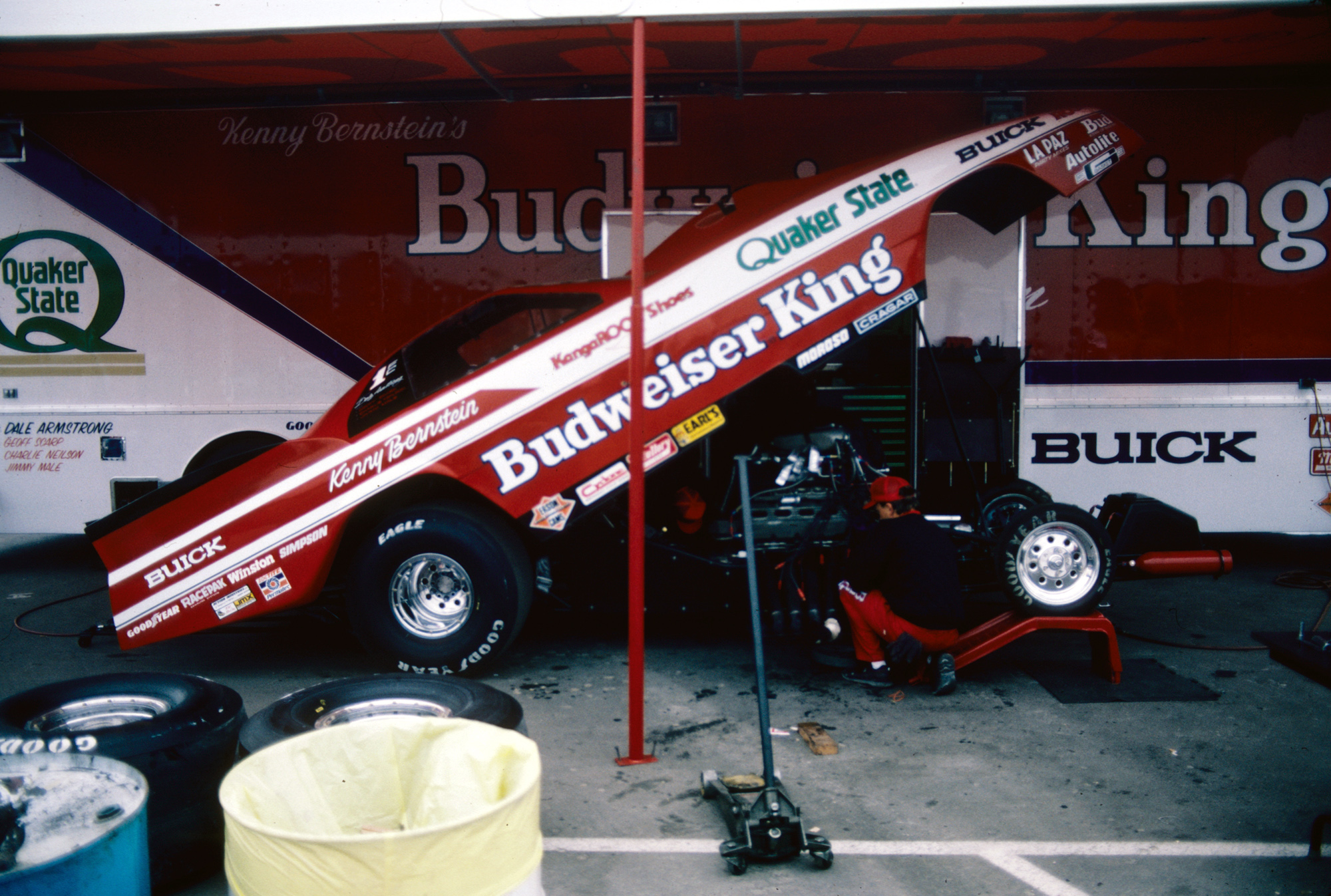
Bernstein's 1987 Funny Car after running a 5.364 pass, then the quickest pass in Funny Car history

Armstrong joined Bernstein's team as his crew chief in 1982. In late 1983, he took their new Ford Tempo-bodied Funny Car to a wind tunnel and found additional speed after some modifications. Bernstein had a 5.80 e.t. with an all-time-best 260.11-mile-per-hour (418.61 km/h) pass in the 1984 Gatornationals finals to beat John Collins. Bernstein ran third in points that season in his Budweiser Tempo. Armstrong tested an on-board computer to see when the clutch was engaged and when the spark plugs were firing.

Bernstein won the 1985 championship after winning six of 12 national events and reaching nine finals. The Armstrong-wrenched Tempo set two national records during the season. Bernstein continued winning in 1986; he won five of 14 events. He qualified number one eight times, set the low e.t. ten times, and reached eight finals. Bernstein had the first Funny Car 270 mile-per-hour pass at the U.S. Nationals (271.41 miles per hour (436.79 km/h) / 5.50 seconds) and lowered the record e.t. into the 5.4 second range with a 5.425-second run at the Chief Nationals.

Armstrong continued as Bernstein's crew chief in 1987 and they used a controversial Buick LeSabre body. Bernstein won a record-tying seven national events and achieved their third consecutive Winston points title. The Buick had the first 5.3 second run at the Winston All-stars race with a 5.39-second e.t. Bernstein tied another Don Prudhomme Funny Car record when he won his fourth straight championship in 1988. His Buick Reatta made six finals, winning three times, achieved six low e.t., and qualified number one five times. In 1989, Bernstein finished third in Funny Car before moving up into the Top Fuel class in the following season.

Armstrong continued as Bernstein's crew chief in Top Fuel, and the combination produced six wins in 1992 which tied a class record. In 1993, Wes Cerny developed a cylinder head / magneto combination that Armstrong tuned for the first 300 miles per hour run. At the Gator Nationals qualifying, Bernstein also set the record e.t. with a 4.823-second pass at 301.70 miles per hour (485.54 km/h) during qualifying for the Motorcraft Gatornationals in Gainesville. Armstrong said:

Being the crew chief on the first car to run 300 means more to me than any national event win or any Winston championship. There isn't any question at all. People will forget what years we won the Winston championship, but they'll never forget when the first 300 was run and who did it.

At the 1994 season-ending Winston Select Finals at Pomona, Bernstein broke the 310 mph barrier with 311.85 and 314.46 passes. In 1996, Bernstein won the Winston Top Fuel championship. In doing so, he was the first driver to win Winston championships in Top Fuel and Funny Car. Armstrong became one of the few crew chiefs to win titles in both classes.

Armstrong and Bernstein parted ways in 1997 after being together for 16 season; Bernstein had won 48 events and five championships with Armstrong. Armstrong joined Don Prudhomme's Miller Lite team at the end of that season. Larry Dixon drove Prudhomme's dragster on the first 4.4 second pass (4.486) at the Matco Tools SuperNationals. In 2000, Armstrong joined Jerry Toliver's World Wrestling team in Funny Car - the team led the Winston points in August before finishing third.

== Innovations ==
Armstrong became the first chief to test Funny Cars in a wind tunnel. Other innovations included equipping dragsters with data recorders, installing a two-stage lockup-style clutch, and a fuel delivery system with two sources. He developed dynamometer testing for nitromethane. Some innovations later outlawed because they were too costly or too fast for the track included a three spark plug per cylinder magneto and a two-speed supercharger.

== Legacy ==
Armstrong was inducted into the Canadian Motorsport Hall of Fame in 1995. He was named eleven times to Car Craft magazine's All-Star Drag Racing team; he received their Ollie lifetime achievement award with Bernstein in 1997. In 2001, the NHRA ranked him tenth on their Top Fifty drag racers of all time. He was inducted into the Motorsports Hall of Fame of America in 2010.
