= Blaine Johnson =

American drag racer (1962–1996)

- Born: May 22, 1962 Santa Maria, California, U.S.
- Died: August 31, 1996 (aged 34) Indianapolis, Indiana, U.S.

Top Fuel
- Years active: 1994–1996
- Teams: Johnson Racing
- Best finish: 5th in 1995–1996

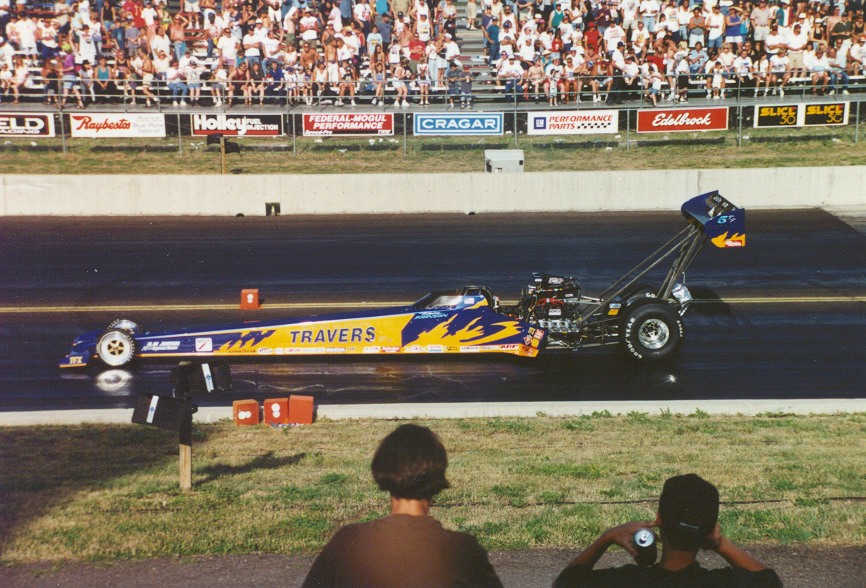
Blaine Johnson's last appearance at Denver

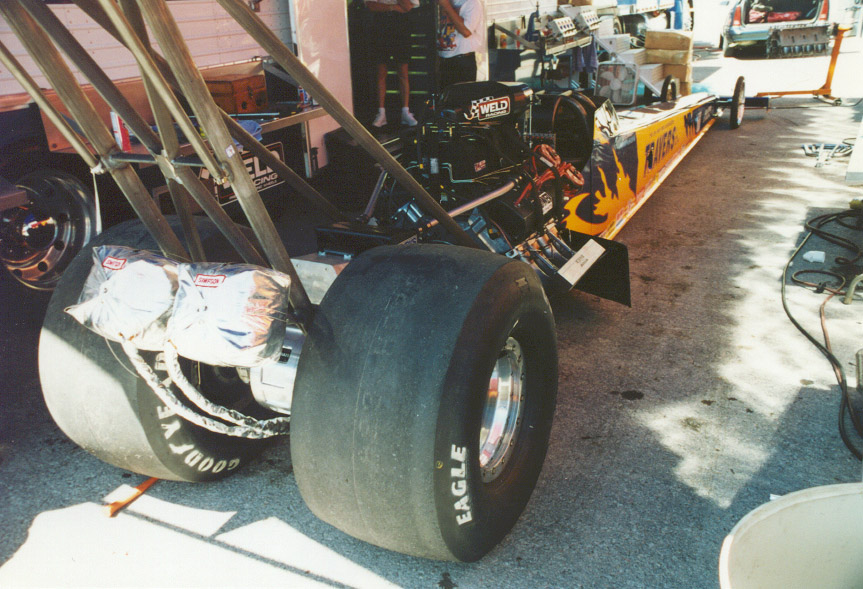
Johnson dragster

Blaine Hiram Johnson (May 22, 1962 – August 31, 1996) was an American professional drag racer.

Blaine, along with his lifelong crew chief and brother, Alan, were competitors in the NHRA Top Alcohol Dragster Series, a series which they entered in 1988. Johnson won four championships in that series (1990–1993). He entered the Top Fuel class in 1994 after receiving his competition license for that class prior to the beginning of the season that year.

At the time of his death, Johnson held a record 26 NHRA titles in the Alcohol Division, until he was later surpassed by Rick Santos.

However, on August 31, 1996, Johnson died from injuries sustained in a crash at the NHRA U.S. Nationals held at the Indianapolis Raceway Park. Johnson's engine exploded right as he reached the finish line. Debris from the engine cut down the rear tires; the thick rubber from the tires in turn sheared off the rear wing, causing a loss in aerodynamic downforce at the rear of the dragster, which caused Blaine to lose control. His out-of-control race car then slammed into a guardrail apex (an opening in the guardrail that existed for safety vehicles to enter the track), at around 300 m.p.h.. Johnson's car was heavily damaged as a result of the incident. He was sent to Indiana University Health Methodist Hospital, but was pronounced dead on arrival.

Johnson was the first Top Fuel driver to die on track since Pete Robinson at the 1971 Winternationals, and would remain the last driver to die until 2004, when Top Fuel driver Darrell Russell was killed during an event in Madison, Illinois.

Johnson's final pass was a track-record run of 4.61 seconds, which remained for two years before Gary Scelzi (who succeeded Blaine Johnson as the driver of Alan Johnson's dragster) would beat it. Johnson was also the Top Fuel national record holder at the time of his death (with a 4.59 second elapsed-time), a record that would stand until 1999 when Larry Dixon would beat it.

Blaine had amassed enough points in the first part of the year to finish fifth in the season ending points standings. At the awards ceremony after the end of the season, Top Fuel Champion Kenny Bernstein gave his championship trophy to Blaine's brother Alan. According to Alan, that particular trophy is in "a place of honor" at his home in Santa Maria.

The day after his death, on the first day of Eliminations, his opponent Tony Schumacher, performed drag racing's version of a "missing man" formation, idling down the track out of respect to Johnson. During the final round, event winner Cory McClenethan, who was in the lane opposite Johnson during his last ride down the track, stated very clearly, "And I'll tell you something else, when I get up there and get that trophy, it's going to Alan Johnson. Blaine, we love you, buddy."

Throughout the rest of the 1996 and deep into the 1997 seasons, the drivers in Top Fuel, and even some in Funny Car, sported stickers on their cars that read "In Memory of Blaine Johnson". Many drivers continued to have black tape across their car numbers in mourning, and 1996 Top Fuel points Champion Kenny Bernstein dedicated the remainder of the season to the memory of Blaine. After Alan Johnson picked Gary Scelzi to replace Blaine, he designed the new Winston No Bull dragster, which carried on the windscreen "In Memory of Blaine Johnson" for the remainder of the car's life. Blaine's brother, and crew chief, Alan Johnson, went on to be the crew chief for all three of Gary Scelzi's championships in Top Fuel, and was the crew chief for eight time Top Fuel Champion Tony Schumacher for five of his eight championships, amassing eight championships as a crew chief. He was part-owner of two car Al-Anabi Racing Top Fuel team. He presided over and tuned the team to three championships. The first title being in 2010 with driver Larry Dixon, then in 2011 with driver Del Worsham, and again in 2013 with driver Shawn Langdon. Alan is currently a co-crew chief with John Force Racing, tuning Top Fuel driver Brittany Force to her first ever Championship in 2017. Thus bringing his total to 12 championships.

On the National Hot Rod Association Top 50 Drivers, 1951–2000, Blaine Johnson was ranked No. 36.

In 1996, the NHRA established the Blaine Johnson Memorial Award, which is awarded annually to the person or group that best exemplifies the qualities of Blaine. The award is a small bronze bust of Blaine atop a wooden base, with a brass plaque etched with the winner's name and the words NHRA Blaine Johnson Memorial Trophy.

Since 1997, following the NHRA Finals in Pomona, the Johnson Family has hosted the Blaine Johnson Memorial Golf Tournament in which the race community and the public participate to earn funds for the Blaine Johnson Memorial Foundation. The Foundation was created by Blaine's family to provide funds for scholarships to students in the Automotive Technology Lab at Allan Hancock College that exemplify the drive and determination that Blaine exhibited on the track and in life. The foundation also provides material support to the department such as machines and tooling.

Preceded by Lee Shepherd	NHRA FullThrottle Drag Racing fatalities 1996	Succeeded by Darrell Russell
