= Travers Tool =

Travers Tool is a distributor of metalworking tools and industrial supplies. The company is based in Flushing, New York, and has distribution branches in or near New York City, Los Angeles, and Duncan, South Carolina.

Travers sells high speed steel cutting tools, solid carbide cutting tools, carbide indexable cutting tools, blades, abrasives, deburring tools, files, machinery, machine tools, machine tool accessories, measuring tools, inspection instruments, hand tools, power tools, pneumatic tools, welding equipment, fasteners, tooling components, stock materials, Maintenance, Repair and Operations (MRO) products, safety products and equipment, material handling equipment and reference books and software.

== History ==
Travers Tool Co., Inc. was started in 1924 by David Trevas. An aspiring young entrepreneur, David borrowed $1000 and asked a New York tool distributor to let him place a telephone on one of the empty desks at the office. After gaining some measure of success, David opened his first metalworking tool distribution office at 5 Court Square in Long Island City, New York. Because many of his customers did not pronounce his last name correctly, David Trevas named his company Travers Tool Co., Inc.

Seymour Trevas started working for his father in the 1930s. In the 1940s, Travers Tool was honored by receiving the coveted Navy E Award (for excellence) as a navy subcontractor. In the 1950s, Travers Tool relocated to 10-23 Jackson Avenue in Long Island City. In 1967, under the leadership of Barry Zolot, Seymour's son-in-law, the first Travers Tool mail order Master Catalog was created. This move served as a catalyst for significant growth for the company. In 1974, Travers Tool purchased and moved into a 25,000-square-foot (2,300 m^{2}), 2-story facility at 25-26 50th Street in Woodside, New York.

As business grew throughout the 1980s, Travers Tool moved into a larger facility at 128-15 26th Avenue, Flushing, New York and built a 75,000-square-foot (7,000 m^{2}) warehouse in Duncan, South Carolina.

== Racing sponsor ==
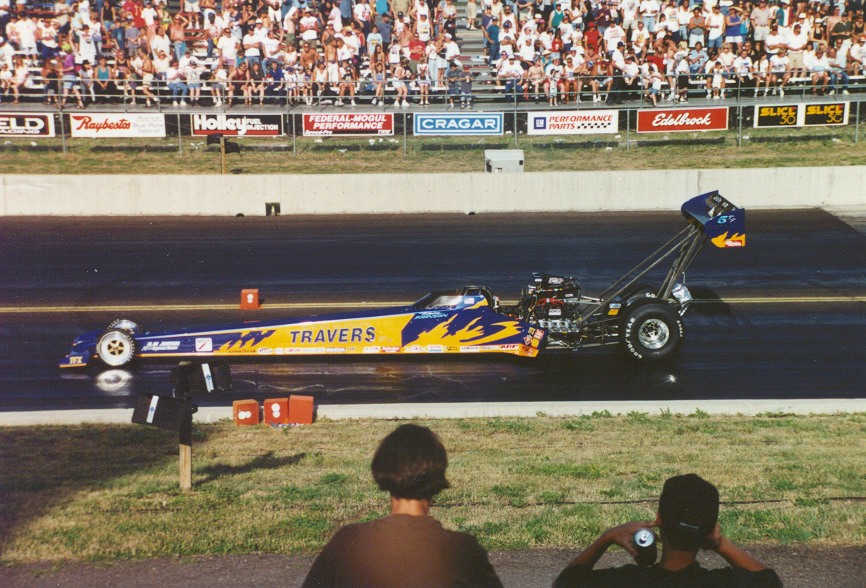
Blaine Johnson dragster

In 1994, Travers Tool Company went into sponsoring race cars, first, in the NHRA, when they sponsored Blaine Johnson for his entire career, which lasted from the 1994 Winter Nationals, to the 1996 U.S. Nationals, where Johnson was killed during qualifying, Travers Tool Company has not sponsored a driver since.
