= Del Worsham =

American NHRA driver (born 1970)

- Nationality: American
- Born: February 11, 1970 (age 56) Whittier, California, U.S.

Funny Car Driver career
- Debut season: 1990
- Current team: Worsham & Fink Racing
- Car number: 750 FC
- Former teams: Roger Primm Racing, Alan Johnson Racing, Kalitta Motorsports
- Starts: 412
- Wins: 33 (TF: 8 FC: 25)
- Fastest laps: TF: 3.73 et/ 327mph FC: 3.83 et/ 332mph
- Best finish: TF: 1st FC: 1st in 1992 (FC); 2011 (TF); 2015 (FC)

Previous series
- 1990-2016: IHRA Funny Car, NHRA Top Fuel Dragster, Funny Car

Championship titles
- 1992 2011 2015: IHRA Funny Car Champion; NHRA Top Fuel Champion; NHRA Funny Car Champion

Awards
- 1991 1998: NHRA Rookie of the Year; Blaine Johnson Award
- Statistics up to date as of 11/2015.

Del Worsham (born February 11, 1970, in Whittier, California) is an American NHRA driver who began his professional career as a driver in Pomona, California, in 1990. Worsham drives a Lucas Oil sponsored car Worsham Racing, a family team. Through the first five races of the 2011 season, he has amassed 33 career victories, eight in the Top Fuel Series and 25 in the Funny Car Series. In 1991, Worsham became the youngest driver (age 21) to win a Funny Car event and went on to win the NHRA Rookie of the Year. His best finish in the Point Standings first came in 2011 when he won the NHRA Full Throttle Championship in Top Fuel. In 2015, Worsham won the NHRA Mello Yello Championship in Funny Car. He became the third driver to win championships in both Top Fuel and Funny Car, joining Kenny Bernstein and Gary Scelzi in this category.

== NHRA career ==
Worsham made his first professional start at the last race of the 1990 NHRA season in Pomona, California. He competed primarily in the Funny Car series from his debut through the 2010 season. He did, however, split his time between Funny Car and Top Fuel from 1993 to 1995. At the beginning of the 2011 season, he switched to the Top Fuel series.

Worsham's best performance came in 2004 when he finished second place in the Funny Car Point Standings. His five victories and 41 elimination round wins that came in 2004 are also personal bests.

Worsham drove for his family's team from the beginning of his career until joining the Al-Anabi Racing Toyota Funny Car team in 2009. In 2017, Del re-joined his family team.

Del Worsham's Career Statistics (Funny Car Series)
Year	Starts	Wins	Points Finish	Round W-L
2010	23	0	6	21-23
2009	24	3	7	25-21
2008	24	1	13	11-16
2007	23	0	9	18-21
2006	23	0	11	12-20
2005	23	2	8	22-21
2004	23	5	2	41-18
2003	23	3	4	31-20
2002	23	4	3	35-18
2001	24	4	3	35-20
2000	23	0	8	17-22
1999	22	1	7	12-20
1998	22	0	10	13-19
1997	22	0	11	10-21
1996	19	0	7	17-17
1995	17	0	16	3-10
1994	5	0	19	2-3
1993	12	0	13	7-11
1992	18	0	4	24-18
1991	18	2	6	25-15
1990	1	0	35	0-1

=== 1991-1992: NHRA Rookie of the Year ===
After starting the last race of the 1990 season, Worsham began his professional drag racing career in 1991 driving his father's Nitro Funny Car. Seven races into the season, he won the Southern Nationals in Atlanta, Georgia. In doing so, Worsham, who was 21 years old at the time, became the youngest driver ever to win a Funny Car event. He continued his early success by winning the Summernationals in Englishtown, New Jersey, less than three months later. At the conclusion of the 1991 season, Worsham finished sixth in the Funny Car points standings and was named the NHRA Rookie of the Year.

Worsham followed up his strong performance in 1991 by placing second in three events: the U.S. Nationals, the Summernationals, and the Southern Nationals. Although he did not win a race, he placed fourth in the Funny Car points standings, a two-place improvement from his rookie year.

=== 1993-1995: Top Fuel and Funny Car ===
In 1993, Worsham participated in select Top Fuel races, ultimately starting eight times in the Top Fuel Series. He recorded a top speed of 300.20 mph while participating in Top Fuel. In the Funny Car Series, he finished runner-up only once, losing to John Force at the Winternationals in Pomona, California.

Worsham continued to participate in both the Top Fuel Series and Funny Car Series in 1994, starting 12 and five races, respectively. After an engine exploded during one of his races, Worsham missed 12 weeks of the season to heal the burns he sustained. In total, he advanced to the Quarterfinals three times and failed to advance each time.

1995 was the last year Worsham raced in the Top Fuel Series until the 2011 season. He raced only twice in the Top Fuel Series, however, while he made 17 starts in Funny Car. He made it to the semifinals once, and he finished 16th overall in the Point Standings.

=== 1996-1997: The Return to Funny Car ===
Racing in only the Funny Car Series in 1996, Worsham reached the semifinals five times within his 19 starts. Although he never made it to the final round, he finished seventh overall in the Point Standings, his best finish in three years.

In 1997, Checker-Schuck’s-Kragen Auto Parts became the primary sponsor of Worsham's team. Similar to the previous year, Worsham advanced to the semifinals three times but lost each time. He would finish 11th in the Point Standings.

=== 1998: Blaine Johnson Award Winner ===
In 1998, Worsham advanced to the final round at the inaugural race at Route 66 Raceway in Joliet, Illinois, marking the first time in six years he advanced past the semifinal round. He would lose to Whit Bazemore, however, and finished the season in 10th place in the Point Standings.

NHRA presented the 1998 Blaine Johnson Award to Del and his family at the end of the season. This prestigious award was created by NHRA to commemorate late Top Fuel driver Blaine Johnson, who died during a crash in August 1996 at the U.S. Nationals. According to the official NHRA website, "the award is presented to the individual, team or family who best demonstrates perseverance and dedication to NHRA Drag Racing."

=== 1999-2000 ===
Through 22 Funny Car starts, Worsham qualified for the championship rounds every time except once in 1999. In addition, Worsham won his first race since his rookie year by ousting Whit Bazemore at the Prolong Super Lubricants Northwest Nationals in Seattle, Washington. He would go on to finish seventh in the Point Standings.

In 2000, Worsham made 23 Funny Car starts and failed to qualify for the Sunday rounds only once. He advanced to the semifinals five times, but failed to advance to the final round. Overall, Worsham finished eighth in the Point Standings, marking the sixth time he had finished in the Top Ten in his career.

=== 2001-2003: Top-4 Finishes ===
Del Worsham's Career Statistics (Top Fuel Series)
Year	Starts	Wins	Points Finish	Round W-L
2011	22	8	1	53-14
1995	2	0	34	0-0
1994	12	0	20	1-3
1993	8	0	19	3-6

Worsham was one of only three Funny Car drivers to qualify for the championship rounds in all 24 Funny Car events in 2001. He advanced to the semifinals ten times, winning five of those races. In the five Final Round races he participated in, Worsham won four, the most single-season victories of his career at the time. His wins came at Houston, Texas (O'Reilly Nationals); Joliet, Illinois (Lucas Oil Products NHRA Nationals); Sonoma, California (FRAM Autolite Nationals); and Pomona, California (Auto Club of Southern California NHRA Finals). He also posted 35 victories in the elimination rounds against 20 losses. Those 35 victories would be a career-best for Worsham until 2004. Overall, he scored 1490 points, good enough for third place in the 2001 NHRA POWERade Championship Point Standings, 510 points behind 2001 Funny Car champion John Force. Because of his outstanding performance in 2001, Car Craft Magazine nominated Worsham for Funny Car Driver of the Year.

Worsham continued to race well in 2002, qualifying for all but one of the championship rounds. He advanced to the semifinals eight times, winning six of the eight races. He matched his win total from the previous year (four), winning at Chandler, Arizona (Checker-Schuck's-Kragen Nationals); Joliet, Illinois (Chicagoland Dodge Dealers NHRA Nationals); Denver, Colorado (Mopar Part Mile-High Nationals); and Ennis, Texas (O'Reilly Fall Nationals). He also matched his 2001 victory total (35) in the elimination rounds. This was the second consecutive year he won the June race at Route 66 Raceway in Joliet, Illinois. His four wins and six Final Round berths helped him finish third in the Point Standings for the second consecutive year, 337 points behind champion John Force.

Worsham qualified for all 23 Funny Car events in 2003; only three other drivers accomplished this feat that year. In six semifinal appearances, he advanced to the final round five times. He went on to win three races in 2003, which were at Bristol, Tennessee (Mac Tools Thunder Valley Nationals); Madison, Illinois (Sears Craftsman Nationals); and Pomona, California (Auto Club of Southern California NHRA Finals). In addition, he won 31 elimination rounds, only four less than the 35 wins he amassed in 2001 and 2002. Worsham would finish fourth in the Funny Car Series in 2003, 371 points behind champion Tony Pedregon.

=== 2004: Second in the Funny Car Point Standings ===
After strong performances in the previous three years, Worsham followed suit with his career-best NHRA performance to-date in 2004. Qualifying for all 23 Funny Car events, Worsham reached the semifinals 13 times. He advanced to the final round six times and posted a career-best five wins, tying John Force in that category for the season. Following his victory in Phoenix, Arizona, Worsham led the Funny Car Point Standings for the first time in his career. In addition, he won 41 elimination rounds, six more victories than his 2001 and 2002 totals and his career best to-date. He would go on to place second in the 2004 NHRA POWERade Championship Point Standings (297 points behind champion John Force), his best finish ever in an NHRA series and his fourth consecutive Top Four finish.

=== 2005: Eighth Straight Top-Ten Finish ===
Following his tremendous 2004 season, Worsham again qualified for the championship rounds at all 23 Funny Car events in 2005. He reached the semifinals five times and advanced twice. He won both of his Final Round appearances, which were at the K&N Filters SuperNationals (Englishtown, NJ) and the Mac Tools U.S. Nationals (Indianapolis, IN). Worsham finished eighth in the 2005 NHRA POWERade Championship Point Standings, marking the first time in five years he would finish outside of the Top Four. This was the eighth consecutive year, however, that he finished within the top-ten.

=== 2006-2007 ===
Within the first eight races of 2006, Worsham advanced to the Quarterfinals seven times. He only advanced to the semifinals twice, however, and failed to advance to the final round both times. He did not qualify for the championship rounds at Topeka, Kansas, breaking his qualifying streak at 98, which began in 2002. His 11th-place finish in the 2006 NHRA POWERade Championship Point Standings marked the first time in nine years that Worsham finished outside of the Top Ten drivers in Funny Car. Worsham's 12-20 record in elimination rounds in 2006 was also the first time he suffered more losses than wins since the 2000 season.

Although Worsham failed to qualify for the first two Funny Car events in 2007, he would qualify for the next 21, giving him the longest active streak among Funny Car drivers to end the season. He advanced to the semifinals five times and qualified for the final round twice. He lost both times, however (St. Louis, MO, and Sonoma, CA). He returned to the Top Ten in the 2007 Funny Car Point Standings, finishing ninth.

=== 2008: The Final Year of Family Ownership ===
Worsham qualified for 17 of the 24 Funny Car events in 2008, advancing to the semifinals twice. In the only Final Round appearance he made that year, Worsham beat Ashley Force Hood at the O'Reilly Spring Nationals in Houston, Texas. He ultimately finished 13th in the 2008 NHRA Full Throttle Championship Point Standings, his worst finish since 1995. In September 2008, Worsham was named the new driver of the Al-Anabi Racing Funny Car, effective after the 2008 NHRA Funny Car season.

=== 2009-2010: Al-Anabi Racing Funny Car Driver ===
The Alan Johnson Al-Anabi Racing Team debuted in 2009 with Worsham as their Funny Car driver, who was entering his 18th year as a professional NHRA driver. Worsham, who qualified for all 24 Funny Car events, advanced to the semifinals six times that year and won three of those races to advance to the final round. He won in all three of his Final Round appearances, his first multi-win season since 2005. His victories came at the O'Reilly NHRA Midwest Nationals (Madison, IL), the NHRA Thunder Valley Nationals (Bristol, TN), and the Virginia NHRA Nationals (Richmond, VA). He would qualify for the Countdown to One NHRA Playoffs for the first time in his career, and he would place seventh in the Funny Car Point Standings.

In 2010, Worsham qualified for all the Funny Car events for the second consecutive year, and he made it to the semifinals seven times. He only advanced to the final round once, however, and lost to Bob Tasca at Englishtown, New Jersey. Worsham would again qualify for the NHRA playoffs, beginning in ninth place in the Countdown to One. He improved three places in the playoffs, finishing in sixth place in the Funny Car Point Standings, his best finish since 2004.

At the end of the 2010 season, Al-Anabi Racing announced that it would not run in the Funny Car Series in 2011. Worsham, along with teammate and 2010 Top Fuel champion Larry Dixon, would each drive an Al-Anabi Racing Top Fuel dragster in 2011.

=== 2011: Al-Anabi Racing Top Fuel Driver ===
Worsham qualified for his first Top Fuel event since 1994 at the Kragen O'Reilly Auto Parts Winternationals in Pomona, California, and lost in the semifinals. The following race (Tire Kingdom Gatornationals in Florida), Worsham won his first Top Fuel event, beating out seven-time Top Fuel champion Tony Schumacher in the final round. At the SummitRacing.com Nationals in Las Vegas, Nevada, he advanced as far as the semifinals before losing to Brandon Bernstein. At the VisitMyrtleBeach.com 4-Wide Nationals, a Top Fuel event featuring a final round with four drivers, Worsham beat out teammate Larry Dixon, Spencer Massey, and Shawn Langdon for his second Top Fuel victory for the season and his career. On May 1, 2011, at the O'Reilly Auto Parts Spring Nationals, he would ultimately win his second consecutive Top Fuel event, defeating teammate Larry Dixon in the final round again.

On November 13, 2011, Worsham won his first NHRA Top Fuel title over Spencer Massey at Auto Club NHRA Final in Pomona, California. One week later he announced his retirement from driving, now that he's reached his goal of winning a championship in Top Fuel.

=== 2012: Kalitta Motorsports Crew Chief ===
Worsham retired after the end of the 2011 season, to join Kalitta Motorsports as a crew chief for the Toyota Camry Funny Car driven by Alexis DeJoria, daughter of John Paul DeJoria of the John Paul Mitchell Systems hair care line, and sponsored by Tequila Patrón, founded by John Paul.

=== 2013-2016: Kalitta Motorsports DHL Funny Car ===
On November 27, 2012, it was announced that Worsham would relinquish his crew chief position to Tommy DeLago and return to the driver’s seat for Kalitta Motorsports as the pilot of the DHL Toyota Camry Funny Car, replacing Jeff Arend who had driven the DHL Funny car since the latter part of the 2008 season until 2012.

=== 2017-Present: Worsham Racing Lucas Oil Funny Car ===
In late 2016, Worsham announced he would be rejoining his father, racing with the Family Team. The car would be sponsored for at least six races by Lucas Oil Products.

2019- Worsham was co crew chief for Shawn Langdon's Global Electronics funny car with Kalitta Motorsports.

Awards and achievements
Preceded by K.C. Spurlock	NHRA Rookie of the Year; 1991	Succeeded by Dannielle Deporter
Preceded by Tom Hoover	Blaine Johnson Award; 1998	Succeeded by Jim Head

== Personal life ==
Del married his wife Connie in February 1999. They have twin daughters.

== See also ==
- NHRA
- Top Fuel
- Funny Car
- Larry Dixon
- 2011 NHRA Full Throttle Drag Racing Series season
- 2010 NHRA Full Throttle Drag Racing Series season
- 2009 NHRA Full Throttle Drag Racing Series season
- 2008 NHRA Powerade Drag Racing Series season
- 2007 NHRA Powerade Drag Racing Series season
- 2006 NHRA Powerade Drag Racing Series season
