= Kenny Bernstein =

American drag racer and auto racing team owner

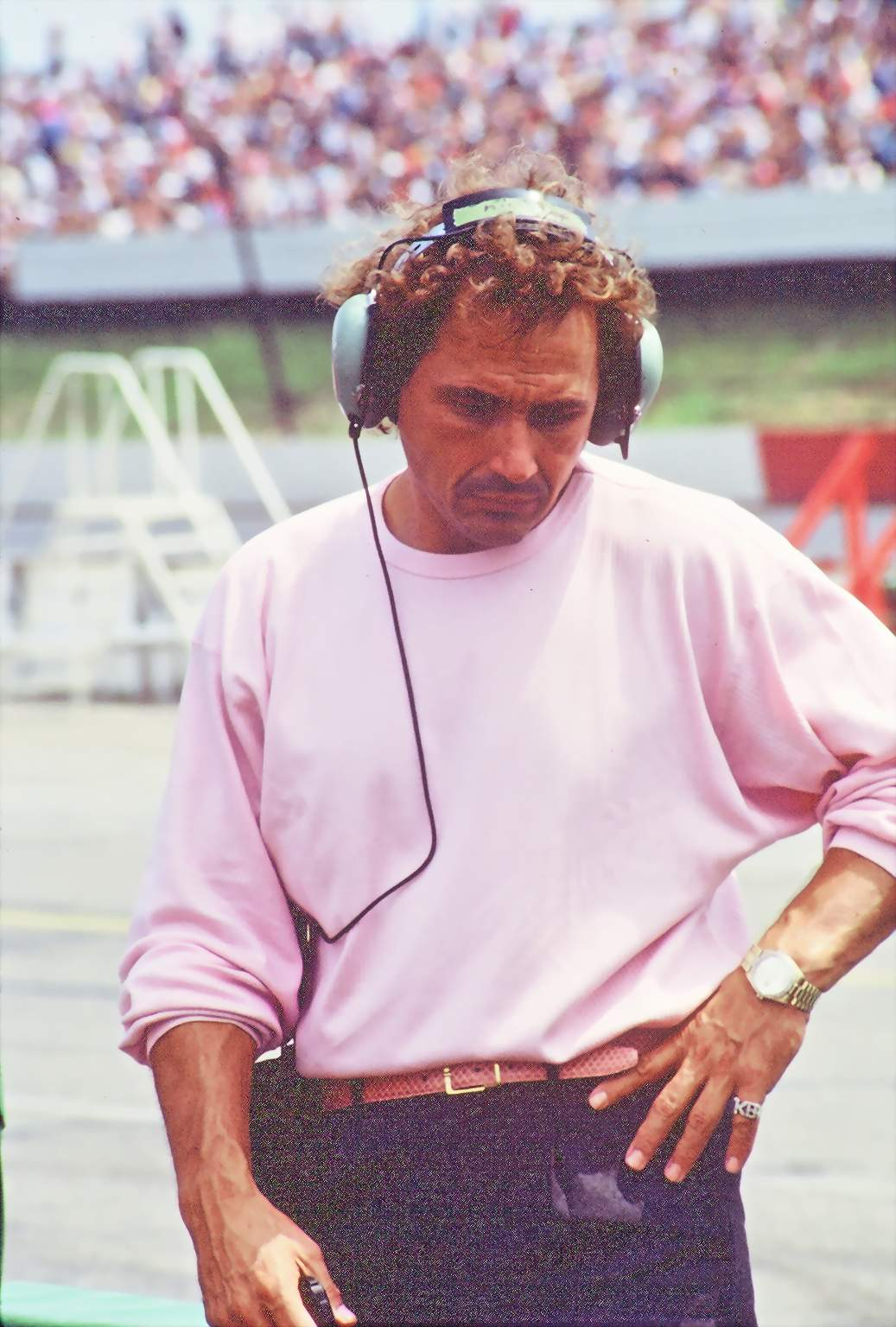
- Bernstein in 1986
- Born: September 6, 1944 (age 82); Clovis, New Mexico, U.S.
- Citizenship: United States
- Education: Monterey High School (Lubbock, Texas)
- Alma mater: University of Texas at Arlington
- Known for: Drag racing; first driver to break 300 mph (480 km/h) in the standing-start quarter mile
- Children: Brandon Bernstein (son)

NHRA Mello Yello Drag Racing Series
- Years active: 1978-2011
- Championships: 6 (4 FC, 2 TF)
- Wins: 69

Championship titles
- 1996, 2001 1985, 1986, 1987, 1988: NHRA Top Fuel Champion; NHRA Funny Car Champion

Awards
- 2009: Motorsports Hall of Fame of America

Kenneth Dale "Kenny" Bernstein (born September 6, 1944) is an American former drag racer and NASCAR and IndyCar team owner. He is a four-time NHRA Funny Car champion and a two-time NHRA Top Fuel Dragster champion, winning a combined 69 events. Bernstein was the first driver to break 300 miles per hour in the standing-start quarter mile, earning the nickname "King of Speed". He is also nicknamed "the Bud King" after his sponsor Budweiser King.

Bernstein owned King Racing, which he drove for in the NHRA and fielded various cars in other racing series such as IndyCar and NASCAR. Bernstein retired from full-time competition in 2002 and moved his son Brandon into the Bud King Top Fuel dragster, but returned to finish the season in place of his son after Brandon suffered a severe injury. With the exception of a brief return to Funny Car in 2007, Bernstein did not return to the car and instead continued to run his team until the end of the 2011 season when he left drag racing altogether.

== Early life ==
Bernstein attended Monterey High School in Lubbock, Texas; he played on the high school's football team. Bernstein was attending the Arlington State College (now University of Texas at Arlington) in 1966 for business administration when he decided to quit to become a drag racer. He did not have enough money, so he became a traveling salesman for Whistle Stop (a clothing line for teenage girls). He drove throughout Texas, Oklahoma, Arkansas, Louisiana, and Tennessee in a Cadillac. In the 1970s he founded and sold a tow truck company and the Chelsea Street Pub restaurant chain.

== Drag racing career ==
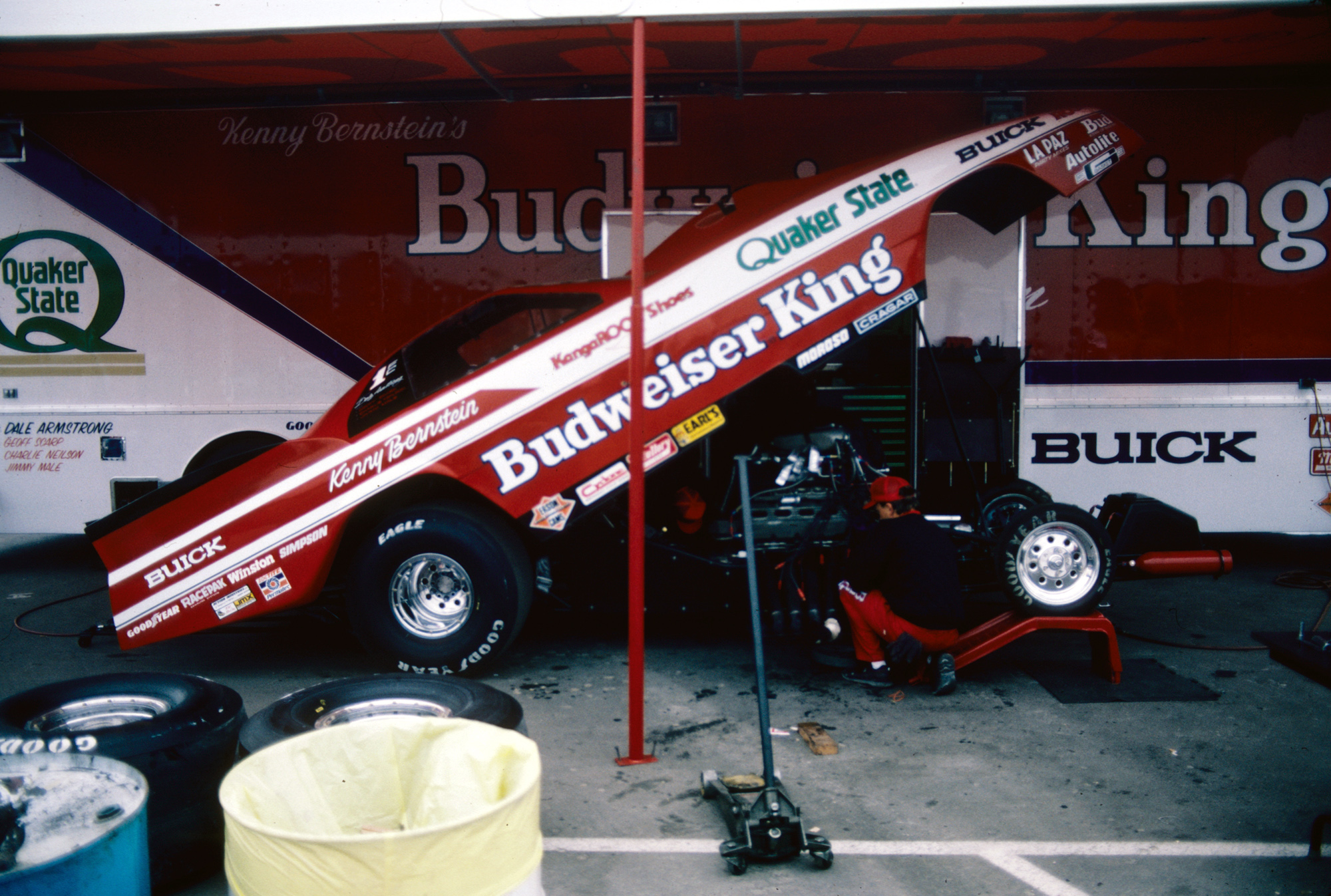
Bernstein's Funny Car in 1987

At the 1978 NHRA Summernationals at Englishtown, Bernstein drove the Chelsea King funny car. He first became a full-time professional Funny Car driver in 1979. The following year, he acquired a sponsorship deal from Anheuser-Busch (with its Budweiser brand), which lasted until 2009. Bernstein won his first Funny Car championship in 1985, and successfully defended his title over the next three seasons.

Bernstein and tuner Dale Armstrong would turn to land speed racers the Arivett brothers to design Bernstein's Bud King Buick LeSabre in 1987. This car would be dubbed the “Batmobile”. It would profoundly change Funny Car aerodynamics.

Bernstein's Top Fuel dragster in 1996

In 1990, following a change in NHRA rules, Bernstein began to drive in the Top Fuel Dragster class. Two years later, Bernstein became the first driver in any class to exceed 300 mph in competition. He won his first Top Fuel championship in 1996, becoming the first driver in NHRA history to win a championship in both of the nitro classes, however, Bernstein states that his 1996 championship was "somewhat tainted" due to the loss of driver Blaine Johnson. At the awards banquet that year, Bernstein gave up his championship trophy to Blaine's brother, and lifelong crew chief, Alan, who has gone on to win twelve more championship trophies himself, as crew chief for Gary Scelzi, Tony Schumacher, Larry Dixon, Del Worsham, Shawn Langdon and Brittany Force. Bernstein reclaimed the title in 2001, and is the only driver to have achieved multiple championships in both nitro categories.

Bernstein retired in 2002, handing driving duties of the "Budweiser King" to his son Brandon. However, he was pressed back into action as a substitute driver after Brandon Bernstein broke his back in June. Although he only raced in 15 events, Bernstein picked up right where he had left off, winning four straight Top Fuel events to close out the season, placing him sixth in season points. He returned to running his team after the season, but rumors began to persist that a comeback was in the works.

In September 2006, Bernstein announced that he would return to racing in the Funny Car division the following season, fielding the Monster Energy Dodge Charger for his own team. His return to active competition was not a good one to start, as he failed to qualify for the opening two events in the 2007 season, earning the minimum ten points each driver gets for making at least one qualifying run. Following those events, Bernstein fired his crew chief Ray Alley and replaced him with Jimmy Walsh, former crew chief for Top Fuel driver J.R. Todd.

Bernstein's results gradually improved over the season, but he did not make the inaugural Countdown to the Championship. He returned to retirement following the season and hired Tommy Johnson, Jr. to drive the Monster Energy Charger for 2008. Bernstein discontinued the team following that season.

Bernstein is the current president of the Professional Racers Organisation (PRO), a group of NHRA drivers, mechanics, and team owners, which has helped influence safety and prize money. In light of the crash that took the life of Eric Medlen, Bernstein has been influential in adjusting safety standards on NHRA race cars and safety restraints.

In 2008, as a direct result of the death of Funny Car driver Scott Kalitta, Bernstein, along with help from 14 time Funny Car champion John Force, six time Top Fuel champion Tony Schumacher, and NHRA's Track Safety Committee, developed a sensor that monitors the engines of Top Fuel dragsters and Funny Cars. Should the engine backfire at any time, the fuel pump will automatically shut off and the parachutes will instantly deploy. This measure is intended to reduce or eliminate circumstances that contributed to Kalitta's death.

After Budweiser stopped sponsoring his team, Bernstein signed Copart Inc. to sponsor Brandon's dragster. They were joined by Lucas Oil for 2011.

On November 15, 2011, two days after the close of the 2011 racing season, Bernstein announced his full retirement from NHRA racing as both driver and team owner.

== Owner ==
Bernstein owned King Racing, a NASCAR team that operated from 1986 to 1995. At the same he operated the Indy car team, King Motorsports. Bernstein is the only team owner to record victories in all three categories. His team raced at the 1988 Indianapolis 500 with Jim Crawford behind the wheel. Crawford, still recovering from leg injuries from the previous year, led 8 laps and finished 6th.

== Awards ==
- Named sixth on the National Hot Rod Association Top 50 Drivers, 1951–2000
- Kenny is the second race car driver to be elected into the International Jewish Sports Hall of Fame (2006). Jody Scheckter was elected in 1983.
- Bernstein was inducted into the Motorsports Hall of Fame of America in 2009.

== Legacy ==
- Bernstein and former crew chief Dale Armstrong are often credited with making aerodynamics a key part of Funny Car design, with a design loosely based on the Buick LeSabre, in 1987. Designed by the Arivett brothers, this car would be dubbed the “Batmobile”. It would profoundly change Funny Car aerodynamics.
- Bernstein's relationship with Budweiser was one of the longest sponsor-driver relationships in motorsports history with 30 years (either him or his son), that started in 1979.

== See also ==
- List of select Jewish racing drivers
