= Holden, Alberta =

Holden
- Village
- Village of Holden
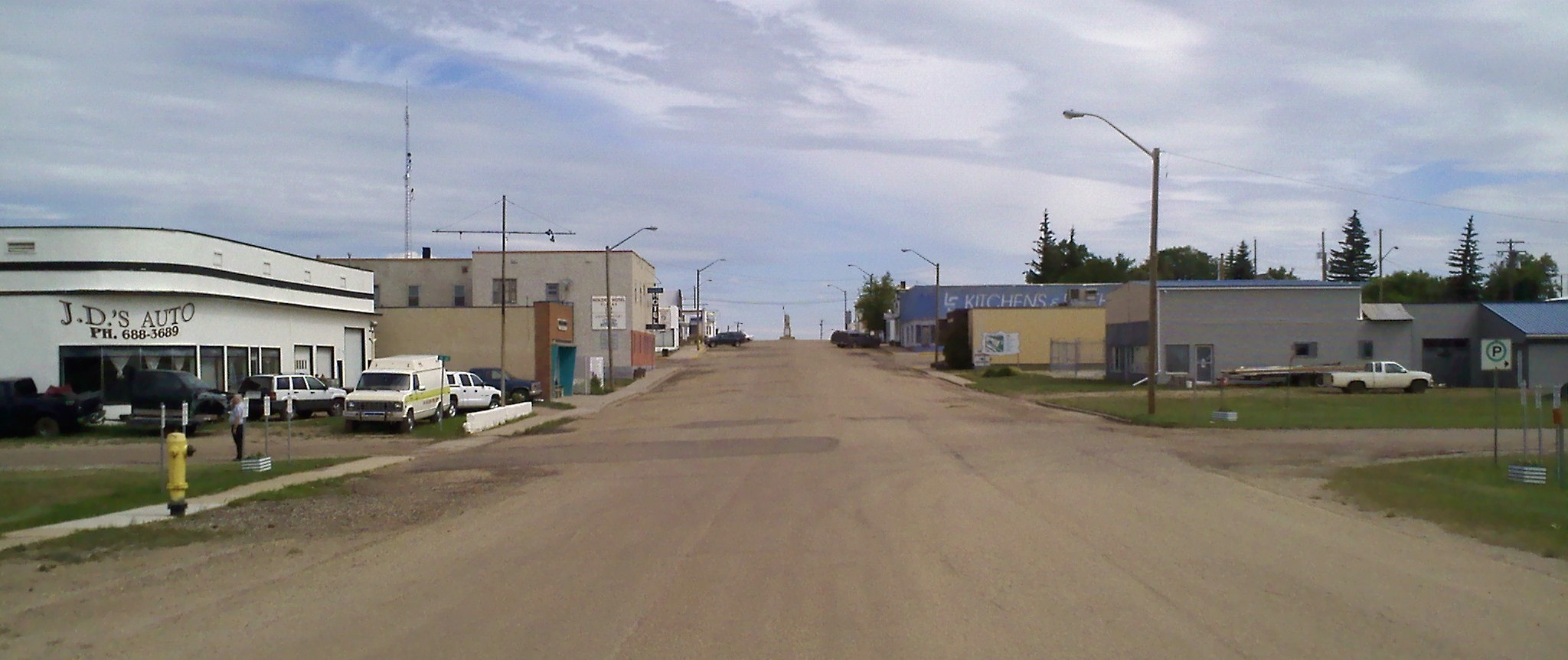
- Main street
- Motto: Share the Charm of Country Living
- Location within Alberta
- Coordinates: 53°13′59″N 112°14′6″W
- Country: Canada
- Province: Alberta
- Region: Central Alberta
- Census Division: No. 10
- Municipal district: Beaver County
- Incorporated
  - Village: April 14, 1909

Government
  - Mayor: Carl Marsh
  - Governing body: Holden Village Council: Tyler Beckett; Tammy Hill; Alan Ramshaw; Shawn Cole
  - CAO: Rosemary Offrey

Area (2021)
  - Land: 1.55 km^{2} (0.60 sq mi)
- Elevation: 686 m (2,251 ft)

Population (2021)
  - Total: 338
  - Density: 217.7/km^{2} (564/sq mi)
- Time zone: UTC−06:00 (Alberta Time)
- Postal Code: T0B 2C0
- Area code: 780
- Highways: 14; 855
- Waterways: Creeks in the area form the head of Vermilion River
- Website: Official website

Holden is a village in central Alberta, Canada. It is located south of Vegreville. The village is named after former Alberta MLA James Holden.

== Demographics ==
In the 2021 Census of Population conducted by Statistics Canada, the Village of Holden had a population of 338 living in 171 of its 205 total private dwellings, a change of −3.4% from its 2016 population of 350. With a land area of 1.55 km^{2} (0.60 sq mi), it had a population density of 218.1/km^{2} (564.8/sq mi) in 2021.

In the 2016 Census of Population conducted by Statistics Canada, the Village of Holden recorded a population of 350 living in 146 of its 167 total private dwellings, a change of −8.1% from its 2011 population of 381. With a land area of 1.74 km^{2} (0.67 sq mi), it had a population density of 201.1/km^{2} (521.0/sq mi) in 2016.

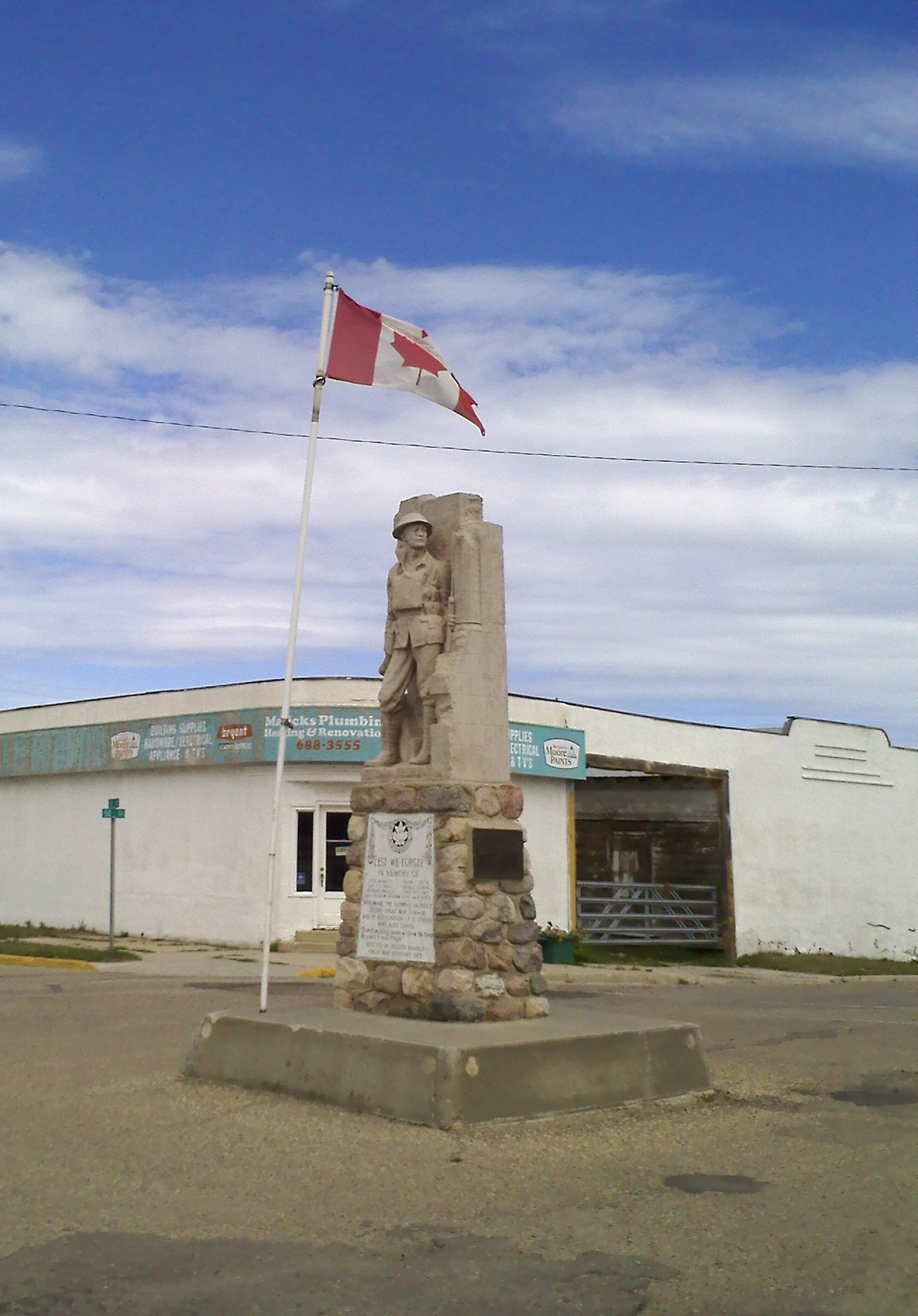
Cenotaph in middle of main street

== Notable people ==
- Dale Armstrong, drag racer
- Ted Newall, businessman

== See also ==
- List of communities in Alberta
- List of francophone communities in Alberta
- List of villages in Alberta
