= Rick Santos =

American drag racer (born 1959)

Rick Santos (born May 8, 1959) is an American retired drag racer known for winning five consecutive NHRA championships in the Top Alcohol Dragster category from 1997-2001.

Santos, who at age 24 had driven nothing faster than a Chevrolet Vega, began driving his father George's small-block-Chevy-powered Top Alcohol Dragster in 1984. His first win was at the 1986 Winternationals. In 1991, Santos won both the Winternationals and the NHRA Finals. Santos scored three wins in 1993, included at the prestigious U.S. Nationals. Santos' car at the time was popular with fans because his small-block Chevy combination was competitive in a class dominated by Hemi engines. The Santos family parked their car prior to the 1996 season due to rule changes that would require them to add 120 pounds to their car and thus take away their competitive edge.

Santos began driving for Jack O'Bannon Racing in 1996. O'Bannon's team had switched from boat racing to NHRA and retained crew chief Norm Grimes. The team hit the ground running and won five consecutive championships between 1997 and 2001. Santos and O'Bannon cut their racing schedule down to just three races in 2002, and Santos retired from driving at the end of that season.

Santos retired with 36 national event wins, 38 division wins, five NHRA championships, and 7 division championships. Santos operates S&S Automotive in San Leandro, California, and spends time with wife Kelly and sons Kyle and Nick.
