= World Wrestling =

World Wrestling may refer to:

- World Wrestling Entertainment, an American professional wrestling promotion
- World Wrestling Championships, an amateur wrestling championship.
