= Darrell Russell (dragster driver) =

American racing driver

Darrell James Russell (September 20, 1968 – June 27, 2004) was an American National Hot Rod Association (NHRA) drag racer. He was the 2001 NHRA Rookie Of The Year. At the time, he was the third driver to win in his Professional class debut.

Before becoming a driver in NHRA's Professional class of Top Fuel Dragster, Russell competed for several years in NHRA's Sportsman (amateur) class of Top Alcohol Dragster, a slower version of Top Fuel. In four seasons of competition driving Joe Amato's NHRA Top Fuel Dragster, he compiled a record of 106 round wins versus 75 losses. He won six events and was runner-up at 11 others, out of 81 events entered.

== Death ==
In 2004 at the NHRA Sears Craftsman Nationals at Gateway International Raceway in Madison, Illinois, near St. Louis, Russell was competing in the second round of eliminations against Scott Kalitta when his dragster went out of control and crashed just past the finish line. When the NHRA safety team got to Russell, he was unconscious, but breathing. Russell was extracted from his dragster by NHRA emergency services officials and transported by air to the St. Louis Medical Center, where he was later pronounced dead. His dragster broke up after he crossed the finish line. One of the rear Goodyear tires blew out, damaging the back part of the race car. Shrapnel caused by the exploding tire entered the driver's cockpit from the rear, fatally injuring Russell. Flying debris from the explosion killed him, not the impact from the crash.

Russell died of severe head injuries, even though he was wearing an approved racing helmet. He was the first racer to be killed at an NHRA national event since Blaine Johnson, in 1996. Gateway named one of its grandstands "The Darrell Russell Stand" in his memory.

Russell was interred in the Klein Cemetery in Pinehurst, Texas in Montgomery County. Over 2,000 people attended his funeral.

== Aftermath ==
After Russell's death, Goodyear quickly designed and released an improved version of their top fuel tire, and the NHRA required that all top fuel cars switch to the new tire for the race immediately following the Gateway event. The new tires are a harder compound, which improves puncture resistance and also causes the tires to expand less, improving safety. The NHRA also reduced the maximum nitromethane content of the fuel from 90% to 85% to reduce power, changed the maximum primary rear wing element angle to 2 degrees positive (measured when the dragster is at rest) to reduce downforce, and required that top fuel cars install a 2 mm (0.090 inch) thick titanium shield behind the driver's head to block shrapnel from reaching the driver. They also required that rear tires have no less than the minimum manufacturer recommended tire pressure, which is 7 psi (48 kPa). To enforce this, Goodyear officials check, and if needed, adjust rear tire pressures at the starting line to meet the 7 psi minimum requirement.
