= Gary Scelzi =

American racing driver (born 1960)

- Born: Gary Eugene Scelzi; August 11, 1960 (age 66) Fresno, California, U.S.

NHRA Powerade Drag Racing Series
- Years active: 1996 – 2008
- Teams: Alan Johnson Racing, Don Schumacher Racing
- Wins: 43

Championship titles
- 1997, 1998, 2000 2005: NHRA Top Fuel Champion NHRA Funny Car Champion

Gary Eugene Scelzi (born August 11, 1960) is an American dragster racer and midget car owner who has won the NHRA Camping World Drag Racing Series Top Fuel championship on three occasions and the Funny Car title once. In 1997 he won the title in his first full year of competition, after replacing Blaine Johnson, who had been killed at the 1996 US Nationals, while leading the top fuel championship, in the Johnson family-owned car. He has not competed in NHRA competition since the 2008 season.

== Racing career ==
Scelzi was hired by Alan Johnson to replace his brother Blaine, killed in a crash at the U. S. Nationals in 1996. Ironically, Mike Neff, Scelzi's crew chief for the 2005 Funny Car championship, moved to John Force racing to drive starting at the 2007 ACDelco Las Vegas Nationals to replace Eric Medlen, who was killed in a testing crash after the Mac Tools Gatornationals in 2007.

Scelzi went on to win three Top Fuel championships, but at the end of the 2001 season, with the Alan Johnson-owned team losing its Winston sponsorship because of the Master Settlement Agreement, and also partly due to a major accident he had that season, he jumped to Funny Car, with new sponsorship, and a Toyota Celica. The results were a disaster for Scelzi, and he resigned from his ride midway through the season, only to join Don Schumacher Racing for the 2003 season in an Oakley sponsored Dodge funny car.

Scelzi unseated the John Force Racing dynasty, defeating John Force and Robert Hight to win the 2005 NHRA Full Throttle Funny Car Championship, making it the first time since 1992 (Miner Bros Racing) with Cruz Pedregon driving, a team other than John Force Racing had won the NHRA Mello Yello Drag Racing Series Funny Car championship. That championship also made him only the second person in NHRA history to win championships in both Top Fuel and Funny Car, the other at the time being Kenny Bernstein. Del Worsham, of Kalitta Motorsports, would become the third in 2015.

In 2005, Scelzi accomplished a feat that only Kenny Bernstein had done, when he won his first Funny Car Championship, becoming the second driver in NHRA history to win championships in Top Fuel, and Funny Car. Bernstein accomplished this in 1996 as he won his first of two Top Fuel titles.

In 2006, Scelzi's midget was driven by 16-year-old driver Michael Faccinto of Hanford, California, who won the 2006 United States Auto Club National Ford Focus Midget Championship, including wins at the Turkey Night Grand Prix in Irwindale, California. Scelzi sold his Focus Midget at the end of 2006 and moved up to standard midgets with Dodge powerplants, with sponsorship from his Funny Car sponsors.

After the 2008 season, Scelzi retired from driving his Fuel Funny Car to focus on Scelzi Enterprises. He was succeeded by #2 points finisher in 2010, Matt Hagan, who drove the DieHard Dodge Charger for Don Schumacher Racing until leaving for the newly formed Tony Stewart Racing team in 2022.

In his spare time, Scelzi has raced midgets for fun, even competing in the Chili Bowl Nationals in Tulsa, OK, competing in a 2003 "celebrity" race against fellow drag racer Ron Capps and dirt trackers Danny Lasoski, Scott Bloomquist, Dave Darland, J. J. Yeley, and Tony Stewart. Scelzi also purchased a Ford Focus Midget (a spec-class midget) for personal pleasure and entered the 2005 USAC Turkey Night Grand Prix in Irwindale, CA, racing against a midget owned by fellow NHRA Funny Car champion Cruz Pedregon.

== Personal life ==
Scelzi's sons, Giovanni and Dominic are also race car drivers.
