= Shawn Langdon =

American drag racing driver

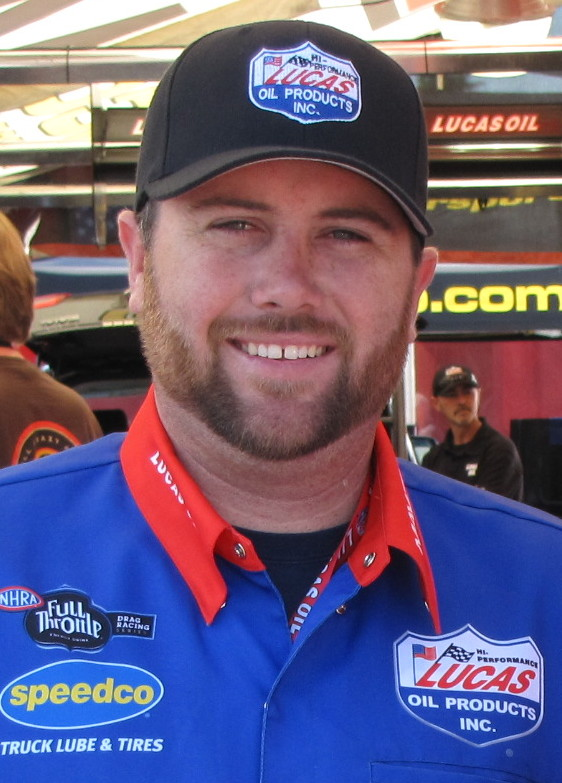
- Langdon in 2010
- Nationality: American
- Born: September 3, 1982 (age 44) Mira Loma, California, U.S.

NHRA Mission Foods Drag Racing Series career
- Debut season: 2009
- Current team: Kalitta Motorsports
- Car number: 4
- Crew chief: Brian Husen
- Championships: 1 (TF)
- Wins: 22 Pro (20 TF, 2, FC); 8 Sportsman
- Fastest laps: Best ET; 3.651 seconds; Best Speed; 338.68 mph (545.05 km/h)

Championship titles
- 2013 & 2026: NHRA Top Fuel Champion
- Statistics up to date as of November 15, 2026.

Shawn Michael Langdon (born 3 September 1982) is an American drag racer from Mira Loma, California. He won the 2013 NHRA Top Fuel championship.
