= Brandon Bernstein =

American racing driver

- Nationality: American
- Born: August 2, 1972 (age 54) Dallas, Texas, U.S.
- Relatives: Kenny Bernstein (father)

NHRA Mello Yello Drag Racing Series
- Years active: 2003-2013
- Teams: Morgan Lucas Racing
- Starts: 37
- Wins: 19
- Best finish: 3rd (3 times) in 2004, 2006–2007

Previous series
- 2000: Top Alcohol

Awards
- 2003: Auto Club Road to the Future Award

Brandon Bernstein (born August 2, 1972) is an American former drag racing driver. He is the son of NHRA legend Kenny Bernstein.

== Early life ==
Bernstein was born in Dallas, Texas, on August 2, 1972, the son of six-time NHRA Champion Kenny Bernstein. He worked with his dad's racing team when he was a teenager. Bernstein attended Texas A&M University and graduated with a Bachelor of Science degree in kinesiology, specializing in Sports Management in 1996.

== Racing career ==
In 2001, Bernstein competed in the NHRA Top Alcohol Series and eventually won Driver of the Year honors. In April of the same year, Brandon and father Kenny became the first father-son duo in NHRA history to win at the same national event when they "doubled" at the SummitRacing.com Nationals in Las Vegas. They doubled again at the Lucas Oil Products Nationals in Chicago in June 2001.

Bernstein (in the far lane) at the 2010 U.S. Nationals

In 2002, Bernstein worked solely as a crew member for his father's race team. In 2003, he made a sensational comeback to racing, winning three of the first eight events of the season. In April, he was in command of the points when he suffered a major accident at Englishtown that sidelined him for the remainder of the season. Despite his accident he was named rookie of the year.

In 2004, Bernstein became the second Bernstein to hold the NHRA speed record when he set it at Chicago. In 2005, Bernstein won two events. In 2006, he logged four event wins and three runner-up finishes, ultimately finishing third in the final points standings. In 2007, Bernstein won five events and contended for the championship but again finished third in a close battle. In 2008, his last season with co-crew chiefs Tim and Kim Richards, the team made four final-round appearances, finishing seventh in point standings. In 2009, under the guidance of crew chief Rob Flynn, Bernstein won in Richmond, Virginia, had four runner-up finishes and was No. 5 in 2009 NHRA Full Throttle point standings.

After losing his ride for Morgan Lucas Racing in 2013, Brandon became Al-Anabi Racing's general manager. He is currently the GM for Alan Johnson Racing.

== Personal life ==
Bernstein resides in Zionsville, Indiana, with his wife Tracey and their two children Lyla and Landon. In his free time, he likes computers, music, beach vacations, and golfing.

== See also ==
- List of select Jewish racing drivers
