= 2027 NHRA Mission Foods Drag Racing Series =

2027 NHRA Mission Foods Drag Racing Series season
- League: NHRA
- Sport: Drag Racing
- League champions: TBA Top Fuel; TBA Funny Car; TBA Pro Stock; TBA Pro Stock Motorcycle

NHRA seasons
- ← 2026 2028 →

The 2027 NHRA Mission Foods Drag Racing Series season is upcoming for the series. The schedule for the first four races in the season were announced on July 8, 2026.

The remainder of the national schedule was announced on August 27, 2026.

In 2026, the NHRA announced it is planning to celebrate the career of John Force in the sport of drag racing as they are calling it: 50 Years of Force.

On September 30, 2026 the NHRA announced brand new media deals with Fox Sports, CW Sports, and FloRacing for a multi year deal starting with this season.

== Schedule ==
| Date | Race | Site | TV | Winners | | | |
| Date | Race | Site | TV | Top Fuel | Funny Car | Pro Stock | Pro Stock Motorcycle |
|---|---|---|---|---|---|---|---|
| February 18–21 | NHRA Winternationals | In-N-Out Burger Pomona Dragstrip; Pomona, California | FOX Sports | | | | |
| February 26–28 | FMP NHRA Arizona Nationals Presented By NGK Spark Plugs | Firebird Motorsports Park; Chandler, Arizona | FOX Sports | | | | |
| March 11–14 | Gatornationals | Gainesville Raceway; Gainesville, Florida | FOX Sports | | | | |
| April 2–4 | NHRA 4-Wide Nationals | zMAX Dragway; Concord, North Carolina | FOX Sports | | | | |
| April 30–May 2 | NHRA Southern Nationals | South Georgia Motorsports Park; Adel, Georgia | FOX Sports | | | | |
| May 21–23 | NHRA Potomac Nationals | Maryland International Raceway; Mechanicsville, Maryland | FOX Sports | | | | |
| June 4–6 | NHRA New England Nationals | New England Dragway; Epping, New Hampshire | FOX Sports | | | | |
| June 11–13 | Super Grip NHRA Thunder Valley Nationals | Bristol Dragway; Bristol, Tennessee | FOX Sports | | | | |
| June 24–27 | Summit Racing Equipment NHRA Nationals | Summit Motorsports Park; Norwalk, Ohio | FOX Sports | | | | |
| July 9–11 | Gerber Collision & Glass Route 66 NHRA Nationals Presented By PEAK | Route 66 Raceway; Joliet, Illinois | FOX Sports | | | | |
| July 23–25 | DENSO NHRA Sonoma Nationals | Sonoma Raceway; Sonoma, California | FOX Sports | | | | |
| July 30–August 1 | Muckleshoot Casino Resort NHRA Northwest Nationals | Pacific Raceways; Kent, Washington | FOX Sports | | | | |
| August 19–22 | NHRA Brainerd Nationals | Brainerd International Raceway; Brainerd, Minnesota | FOX Sports | | | | |
| September 1–6 | Cornwell Quality Tools NHRA U.S. Nationals | Lucas Oil Indianapolis Raceway Park; Brownsburg, Indiana | CW | | | | |
Countdown to the Championship
| September 17–19 | Dodge NHRA Great Lakes Nationals Presented By MOPAR | U. S. 131 Motorsports Park; Martin, Michigan | CW | | | | |
| September 24–26 | NHRA Nationals at The Rock | Rockingham Dragway, Rockingham, North Carolina | CW | | | | |
| October 1–3 | NAPA Auto Parts NHRA Midwest Nationals | World Wide Technology Raceway; Madison, Illinois | CW | | | | |
| October 13–17 | Texas NHRA FallNationals | Texas Motorplex; Ennis, Texas | CW | | | | |
| October 28–31 | NHRA Las Vegas Nationals | Las Vegas Motor Speedway; Las Vegas, Nevada | CW | | | | |
| November 11–14 | In-N-Out Burger NHRA Finals | In-N-Out Burger Pomona Dragstrip; Pomona, California | CW | | | | |
