= Pinks (TV series) =

US television program

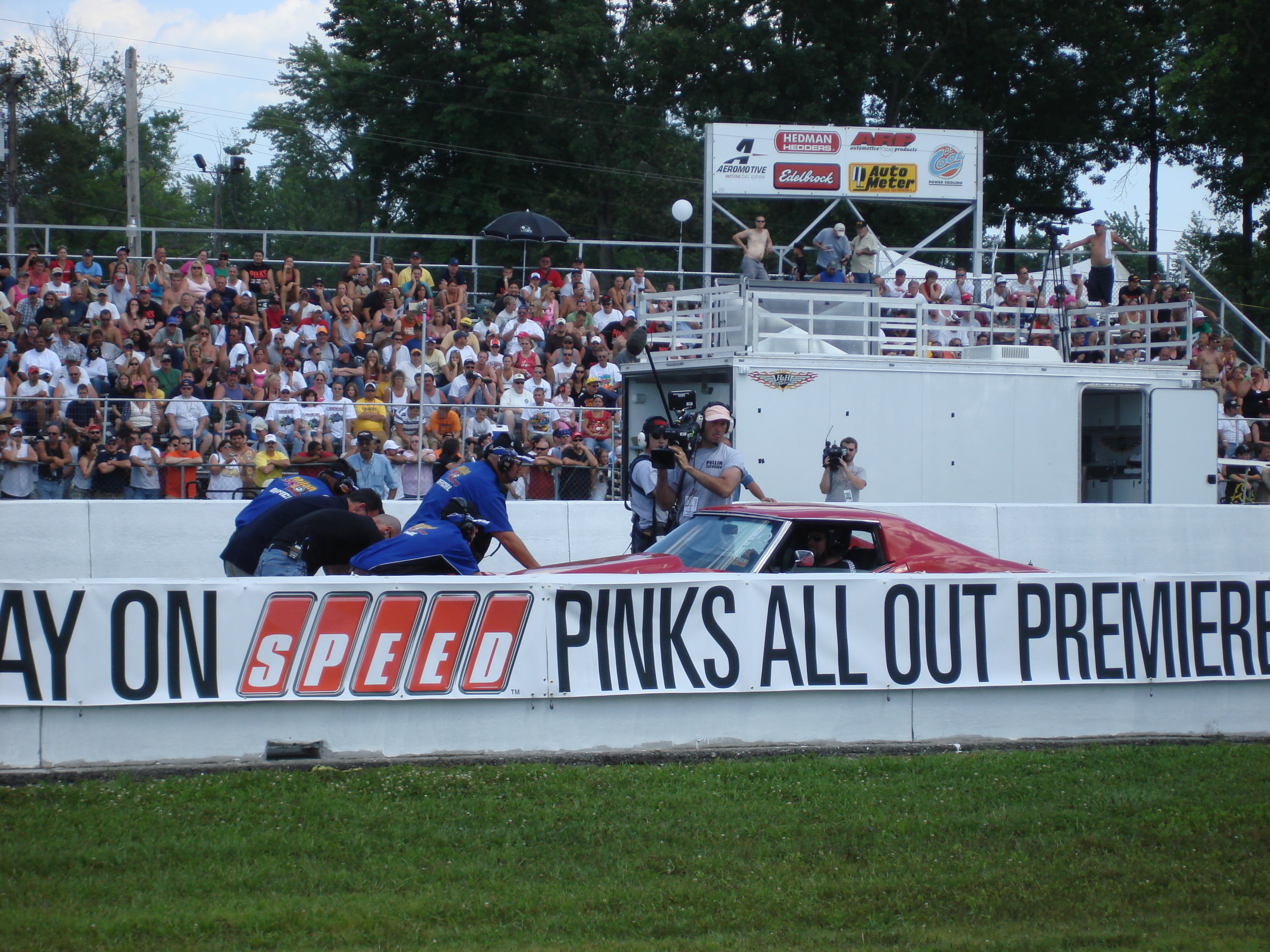
Taping Pinks All Out at Milan (MI) Dragway in 2007. An estimated 33,000 attended the session (there are 17,000 permanent grandstand seats), easily breaking the track's attendance record.

Pinks is the primary television series in a franchise series of television programs on Speed based on street racing, held at legal closed drag strips with a theme around drag racing. The original aired from 2005 to 2008, with the spinoff Pinks: All Out following in 2006 until 2010. The name of the show, and the tagline "Lose the race – lose your ride", refer to common slang of pink slips representing a vehicle's title document recording ownership, and the derivative street-racing phrase, "racing for pinks," meaning a race in which the winner earns the loser's car. (In California, until recently, the vehicle title was on a pink slip of paper.)

The original was aired by Speed in the United States and Canada, and also airs on Fox Sports 3 in Australia. The series is produced by Pullin Television. The 2016 version aired on Outdoor Channel and Fox Sports Racing starting in March 2016 Produced by Brian Bossone's production company Boss One Media llc.

Competitors compete in a drag race (although in the original Pinks, there was a stepladder shifter kart race in Series 1, and the original franchise was based more on illegal street racing) in the franchise. The formats differ between the franchise's formats.

In the original series, the illegal street racing style drag race has provisions of the winner claiming ownership of the losing vehicle.

The race format changed slightly through each season:

- Early Series 1 (2005): 2 out of 3 races
- Later Series 1-Series 4 (2005–2007): 3 out of 5 races
- Series 5 (2008): 4 out of 7 races

As the show starts, the host, staff, and contestants sign a binding contract that will transfer the legal title of the two cars in question to Pullin Television, the production company of the show. Since the production company owns the vehicles it guarantees that the show will award the titles to both cars to the winner of the race and eliminates the chance that the loser will refuse to forfeit his/her car after the race.

== Negotiations ==
Each team is allowed to inspect the opposing team's car to attempt to assess its performance before negotiations for the first race, or in cases where the negotiations are not held for the first race, before the second. Each team chooses a negotiator to act as its spokesperson to discuss the terms of each round. In recent seasons, the first round of each match is often held without negotiation except for terms over the use of nitrous oxide, and features a heads-up start (each car side by side with no time or length handicap)

Negotiations generally deal with starting position, similar to bracket racing (except it is negotiated in car lengths, not seconds), nitrous use, and other such issues, the purpose being to handicap the perceived stronger car and create an even race. In Series 5, negotiating car setup for bracket racing times were permitted. After the negotiations (which can last considerably longer than what is shown), the cars are sent to the start line for the burnout.

== Race ==
As is the case for a regular drag race, the cars are allowed to perform a burnout, after which they are staged according to the negotiated starting positions (if any). If a track official finds suspicious fluids leaking on the track, he may order the car shut down and the round automatically forfeited to the opponent. If there are mechanical or weather questions, the race may be delayed. In some cases, a show taping may be called off if the weather prevents a full race from being filmed.

Pinks uses a street-race-style arm-drop start rather than the "Christmas Tree" electronic starting system used in modern drag racing. The show's signature start signal was devised by show creator and host Rich Christensen. Christensen points at the driver of the car on his right (left lane), waits for the driver to respond with a thumbs up, then drops that arm. Christensen then repeats this with the driver on his left (right lane). Next, Christensen raises both arms, waits for 2 – 5 seconds and then lowers his arms to start the race, which eliminates a popular tactic in drag racing, the delay box, from being used by the car.

Officials, both from the show (since Series 2) and track, observe conditions and tape them for replay in case of false starts (leaving before the hands drop), race infractions (standard drag racing rules apply), and photo finishes. In the case of a photo finish, the video tape of the finish is brought to the start line to allow the teams to agree on the result.

== Fouls ==
As in drag racing, the following are declared fouls on Pinks and the offender loses the round:

- Leaving before Christensen drops his hands. It is a clean start if the car moves once the hands begin dropping. Officials may use replay to verify the legality of a start. If a driver leaves as soon as the hand begins to drop from its highest point, a driver is said to have tree'd their opponent.
  - If both cars jump, the first to jump loses (red light).
  - Rich will often point at the offending lane if he spots the infraction.
- Crossing either boundary line
- Leaking fluid during staging
  - At that point, Christensen will point to the opponent and point him down the track for a bye run and an automatic win.
- Breaking down and not finishing the run
  - Although it has never happened, it is unknown what would happen if one car commits a foul start and the opponent crosses the boundary line. In normal drag racing, the foul start driver wins.
- In Series 5, if negotiations call for bracket race rules, and one car clearly breaks out while the opponent does not break out, that can be grounds for disqualification for sandbagging.
  - Technical advisors will determine time through the timing traps as the scoreboard is turned off, officials still have the ability to observe track timing through the electronic timing system.
  - Times will be taken from standard points at the track and compared to the times from the vehicle's earlier races in order to see where the car "breaks out", with the timing of the racer's start taken into account.
  - The standard timing points in drag racing, excluding the 60-feet time (which Pinks does not use because of the nature of head starts), used by officials are at:
    - 330 feet
    - 660 feet
    - 1,000 feet
    - 1,320 feet
  - It is important that times be compared all along the track as opposed to merely the finish line as a driver, once he has reason to believe he's going to win the race, can easily "pedal" or "fender" his opponent giving him smaller margin of victory, and a higher lap time.

== Winning ==
The match ends when one driver has won the said number of rounds above (2, 3, or 4). After Christensen debriefs the two teams on the previous race, he announces the winner. He then hands the title of both cars to the race winner, and often the winner drives the loser's car down the strip after claiming the car by winning the match. A team may also concede because of a catastrophic breakdown. In the spirit of sportsmanship, such a win will often not include the loser's car and often calls for a rematch on a later episode, believing that they will not take the car unless it was a clear win on the track, and not by default.

== Notes ==
A common occurrence is "set matches", such as import vs. domestic, new vs. old models of a certain make, or races of popular former cars, such as current technical advisor Charles Hendrickson's "Woolly Mammoth", an altered 1976 Chevrolet Vega wagon that beat several more sporty cars. Other matches have featured motorcycles, trucks, and even snowmobiles.

Recent shows have been sponsored (with prizes going to the winner such as free Bridgestone tires or several cases of Shell Q Motor Oil), with Series Four featuring NAPA Auto Parts as the series presenting sponsor for both the regular and All Out series, owing to the show's growing popularity. Current sponsors are NAPA and Valvoline.

The arm-drop start prevents bracket racers from using the delay box, a popular device that is typically used in this genre of drag racing. Typically, with the Christmas tree, the delay box is designed to allow a driver to press the throttle pedal on the second amber, allowing the box to launch the car one second, or in the case on the third amber, a half-second later. The arm drop's unpredictability prevents this popular technique from being used, which forces drivers to watch the official to launch the car.

In 2008, the American Drag Racing League was forced to a Pinks-style arm drop start for the final two rounds of their 1/8 mile races when lightning damaged the Christmas tree at US 131 Motorsports Park in Martin, Michigan.

On the May 28, 2006 episode of WindTunnel with Dave Despain, the show's producer and host Rich Christensen claimed that some losing racers tried to buy back the vehicle after the race, which Rich tried to eliminate in later seasons. However, one race resulted in a win by default when the engine block overheated, leading to a win by "catastrophic failure". In the spirit of sportsmanship, the winner gave the car back to the loser, noting that a win by default caused by such severe mechanical failure is improper, and promised a future rematch. On multiple episodes Rich has allowed a car that has lost due to mechanical failure to be granted back or purchased back by its original owner so it may be raced again. In each of these cases the original episode was unusable due to the nature of the catastrophic failure, so had another race not been held, the episodes likely would have never aired. In 2008, a special episode, "Quitters, No Shows, and Breakdowns" featured many aborted races.

Because of the nature of the show's premise of racing for titles, taping the show is illegal in 40 states. This problem led to the development of a spinoff that does not involve titles and is legal to be taped in all 50 states.

== Pinks: All Out ==
The popularity of the original show led to a full drag meet devised by the staff, with this title in 2006. The goal is to take over 400 cars, run them in trial runs to see which 16 cars will provide the most competitive racing, then race those 16 cars against each other, all in the course of one day. The format later changed to 32 cars.

=== Qualifying ===
As the show opens, a scene shows Rich Christensen discussing how many cars have filed for entry, usually between 250–450, but some Season 3 races feature over 500 cars. The popularity of entries have resulted in the possibility of filing a Pinks entry to be nearly impossible (only 400 cars) that Christensen and the tracks have added "runoffs" weeks before the Pinks meet. Once entries have filled, most tracks will run a special qualifying race to fill out extra entries.

As cars prepare to compete, they are inspected by track officials and technical advisors, including former Pinks contestant turned technical advisor Brian Bossone, and cars are eliminated for problems that may lead to mechanical failure the most notable of which being fluids spilled onto the track, as that can take an hour or more to clean up so racing may resume. Starting in Season 3, automatic disqualification is called for any car that causes a leak of fluids that requires a long delay, especially in violation of track rules.

Unless situations require altering the schedule (inclement weather), the cars take part in one pass per car, using the Christmas tree. This pass uses the Pro Tree (all three ambers light at the same time, then the green four-tenths later) instead of the Standard Tree used by the sportsman drivers that participate in the show (each amber five-tenths after the other), and with the track clocks running and scoreboards displaying time.

At the end of the session, the show officials then determine the most competitive field (not necessarily the fastest) by finding a grouping of cars whose race time are very close together. Those cars are asked to return to the strip for an additional timed run to ensure there is no sandbagging. In the first few seasons, the clock displays were turned off so that only Pinks officials know the elapsed time of the cars. The Christmas tree is turned off, and either Rich or Kail Christensen start the run with the show's signature arm-drop start.

Sixteen cars (but more often 32 in recent years although there was a 64-car field once), known as the "All Out 16", are then chosen by the producers to compete in the main portion of the competition. The cars are not formally bracketed, so the producers and technical officials may determine the race by car types (often by the classic GM-Ford, Ford-FCA, or GM-FCA rivalries, or brand nationality), driver types (sometimes past Pinks grudges, family members, or region), or any manner which they may choose (closest in elapsed time). However the competition is generally limited to what the technical advisors (most of them racers) decide is the "most competitive" field. In many cases they will attempt to come up with something interesting to further qualify the field, for example a slower class being allowed to earn a spot in the final 16, but in every case the idea is to find a full class of at least 16 cars in which each car is running within a tenth to 2 tenths of a second of each other.

Starting in Season 3, the rules of the arm-drop qualifying pass were changed following evaluations. Cars are now paired by their elapsed time, with officials determining a "floating minimum" time that will be posted as the cars are staging. The cars must run faster than the posted time on the display near the starter to continue being considered. This again assists in weeding out sandbagging.

In all cases, the idea is to once again weed out teams that use the delay box, since the Pro Tree would throw off Sportsman racers whose reaction times are based on using a delay box (.500 or 1.000 seconds delay from throttle to launch), and the arm drop is based on a driver's reflexes, and not anything artificial.

The faster official time that is registered in the track computers will form the basis of the "dial-in" time which will be referenced during the race.

Some sessions (Milan (MI) Dragway and Summit Motorsports Park) require the sixteen cars initially selected to "hold" their positions in 16 drag races where they would race against other formidable opponents. This led to a change to 32 cars for most of Season 3.

For the 2015 series, the rules will call for two different classes with each bracket (8–10, 10–11, 11–13 cars, and motorcycles TBD). Two groups of 16 will be selected in each bracket.

=== Race ===
==== Pinks All Out 32 (Some Season 2 and Most Season 3 races) ====
Starting with some Season 2 races, and in most Season 3 races unless inclement weather or curfew force a condensed schedule (the 2009 Texas Motorplex race was condensed because of curfew; two 90-minute delays were caused by cleanup as a result of ethylene glycol coolant spilling on the track, a violation of drag strip rules prohibiting such coolants on the track), a group of 16 cars, dubbed in Season 3 as "Underdogs", will race another group of 16 cars, the "Defenders". Each pair of cars will race a single set of eliminations, using the signature Pinks arm-drop start. The winners advance to the Pinks All Out 16.

Standard bracket racing rules apply, with drivers being eliminated for infractions, and a breakout rule applies. If officials discover the winner of the race was running considerably faster than the fastest official time of the 16 cars, that car will be disqualified and the loser advances. Pinks technical advisors will review elapsed times in the timing tower to ensure no violation of breakout rules apply.

For the 2009 race at zMax Dragway, the field was started with 64 cars instead of 32. The 32 races took place with half on the left pair and half on the right pair of lanes.

In the final season (2010) of the original series, winning this round was worth a gift certificate worth around $500 from a sponsor.

==== Pinks All Out 16 ====
Season 1 and some races in Season 2 afterwards (starting in Season 3, only if weather becomes an issue) start with just the All Out 16, while some Season 2 and most Season 3 races begin with the first round, leading to the All Out 16. As in the first round, each pair of cars (there is no formal pairing) will race in single-elimination rounds using the arm drop start. In this round, the winner receives $1,000 that may be used as betting money in further rounds, and advances to the Pinks All Out 8.

At Charlotte Motor Speedway's zMax Dragway, the 32 winners of the first round (expanded to 64 cars) raced in eight four-car drag races administered like the Pinks All Out 16 round format. The winners of the four-car drag races advanced to the Pinks All Out 8 with the $1,000.

In later seasons, betting on winnings were prohibited, and drivers won straight prize money—typically $500.

In the 2015 revival series, the cars must be driven back to the starting line on their own power between rounds. No use of any pit equipment is permitted or the competitor is disqualified.

==== Pinks All Out 8 and 4 (all) and Championship round (revival series) ====
For each round leading up to the final, the driver's total cash winnings to that point ($1,000 to start Pinks All Out 8) may be used as betting money. Drivers may bet as much of their winnings in each round, but starting in Season 3, the limit is $500. Titles and money that was not awarded for a victory may not be bet. In addition to advancing to the next round, the winner gets whatever money their opponent bet, if any.

During the 2007 round taped at The Strip at Las Vegas Motor Speedway, all 16 All Out drivers agreed to bet all winnings for an "all in" tournament. No other taping has featured the all-in format.

The winners in the All Out 8 advance to the All Out 4, with the same format as the All Out 8 in regards to betting, and the winners of the All Out 4 advance to the All Out Final.

Again, in later seasons, the prize money format was changed to $750 in the All Out 8, and $1,000 in the All Out 4. No betting permitted.

In the 2015 revival series, the Championship round in each of the two brackets is determined the same way. The winner wins $2,500 for the bracket championship.

==== Championship round – Original Series ====
After the third round, the two remaining teams determine lane choice, and in earlier seasons, betting. In many circumstances at this point Rich Christensen will suggest the finalists duel for the prize money only. Then, the cars race in a best two-out-of-three match. Unless requested by a competitor because of a mechanical problem or in case of inclement weather, the cars must be driven back to the starting line on their own power between rounds and be staged for another race immediately. Once the cars are back at the staging area, the process for the next race begins immediately. This is referred to as "hot lapping".

The winner of the finals, in addition to any money bet by their opponent, also wins a $10,000 cash prize. In the original series, a tool chest with tools valued at over $7,000 from NAPA Auto Parts was also provided.

The only exception to this format came during the February 17, 2007 taping at Palm Beach International Raceway. An excessive number of track incidents (oil downs, crashes, debris) slowed the process, where the main elimination rounds started after midnight. With excessively low temperatures when the semifinal rounds were to start after 2:15 AM, the race was called after the second round by mutual consent of the four drivers remaining because of lane conditions. All four drivers split the $10,000 evenly, and one driver, as chosen by the others, won the tool chest.

==== Classic Pinks Final (2015) ====
The winners of the two brackets (12–13 seconds, for example) return to a Classic Final format similar to the original Pinks, except instead of car titles, the two teams can bet some of their winnings in the final, with the producers adding cash bonuses to the pot. Based on performance results from the bracket finals that will be given to both teams and the staff, the two teams can negotiate lengths, format (one round only or two out of three), and lane choice. The overall Pinks All Out champion under the 2015 format is the competitor who wins the match.

=== Sandbagging ===
The All Out format was created because of Rich Christensen’s displeasure with 'sandbagging’ – feathering or decelerating to create a false elapsed time and hide actual performance – on the original Pinks. This format, where brothers and technical directors Adam and Nate Pritchett rigorously select a group of closely matched cars, was made to provide the drama associated with closer racing.

To prevent sandbagging, if a car runs considerably faster than what they ran in practice during any elimination round, they are automatically disqualified ("Breakout"). Officials will be standing at the 1,000 and 1,320 foot markers to observe if a driver is sandbagging.

The show was originally to be titled "Ultimate Racer" but was later changed to the current "All Out" subtitle, a reference that the car is running at its maximum during the race.

=== Quick Eight ===
During taping sessions in 2007 and 2008, officials grew suspicious excessive sandbagging was taking place among racers. Some racers, the officials thought, were running slower times than their cars could run in an attempt to run "in the pack" where they predicted the crew would choose for the All Out 16.

In response to that, some 2008 rounds added a Quick Eight format, where the eight fastest cars would make one championship pass down the strip. The driver with the fastest elapsed time wins $10,000 and a second NAPA toolchest. In other rounds, the Quick Eight became a knockout round, with the eight fastest cars racing against each other in eliminations before the Pinks All Out 16. A pilot was taped during one 2008 taping for this concept to be split into a separate series.

The format has continued for live events in 2009, with the Quick Eight race (now usually run as a straight-up eight-car knockout format) before the Pinks All Out 32. The Quick Eight has their own prizes.

== Motorcycles in the Future ==
On October 4, 2008, Rich Christensen taped two pilots for future consideration, including a fourth concept of the Pinks franchise, at Maryland International Raceway in Budds Creek, MD.

This version, involving motorcycles, featured two classes (Street Bikes and Pro Elapsed Time) of motorcycles. A Pinks All Out 16 was formed from each class. Each class races, Pinks-style, in eliminations to determine their own winner. The winners of each class will participate in a classic Pinks best 4 out of 7 race, complete with classic rules (negotiations, et al.) where the winner wins a new custom motorcycle.

While the format was not picked up, the 2015 revival of Pinks : All Out will feature at least one motorcycle class to be taped as part of Pinks : All Out Week. An all-terrain vehicle 1/8 mile format was also taped and included into an episode.

== Staff ==
The show is hosted by Rich Christensen, who also employs his cousin Kail as an official. Former contestants Charles Hendrickson and Nathan Pritchett (the only person to have run matches with both a car and a motorcycle) are assigned to each team as technical advisors. Gavin Jerome is the roving public address announcer. Former contestant Brian Bossone has also been utilized as a technical adviser. Steve Meade, known as radio personality "Willie B" in Denver, and Clay Millican, NHRA Mello Yello Top Fuel driver, join the Pinks staff in 2009 as technical advisers.

== Rich Christensen and Brian Bossone (Boss One Media) Reacquires the Franchise and Future ==
At the end of the 2010–11 season, Fox Cable Networks did not renew Pinks : All Out due to the change from Speed to Fox Sports 1.

By 2012, as Fox wound down the Speed operations, the franchise was owned by 21st Century Fox. Meanwhile, another street-racing game show format from Lucas Oil owned MAVTV that Christensen developed, Won & Done, was airing. On March 24, 2014, Christensen confirmed on Dragzine.com that Rich Christensen Entertainment had leased the Pinks franchise rights from Fox and was working on a plan with Boss One Media's Brian Bossone for the future of the franchise.

On February 13, 2015, Christensen, Boss One Media and Rockingham Dragway owner Steve Earwood announced Pinks: All Out Week, an entire Independence Day weekend of taping of episodes. The show originally planned three classes (9.00–9.99, 10.00–10.99, 11.00–11.99), motorcycle classes (something that had not been part of the original Pinks: All Out), and a Quick Eight of under 8.99 seconds. Taping is scheduled between July 2–4, 2015 for multiple episodes, at least one each night. However, the immense popularity of registration has forced the show to change the car classes to 8.00–9.99 (8–10 seconds), 10.00–10.99 (10–11 seconds), and 11.00–12.99 (11–13 seconds). Two eighth-mile classes—an all-terrain vehicle class and Jr Dragsters—will also be added.

The new format began airing on Outdoor Channel on March 7, 2016.

== Attendance ==
Normally attendance at live tapings is high, with amateur races and concerts (usually featuring The Nadas, who perform the original show's ending theme "Walk Away") bookending the televised races.

In the June 29–30, 2007 taping of Pinks: All Out at Milan (MI) Dragway, 33,000 spectators attended the taping with 350 cars attempting to compete for the 16 slots.

On December 3, 2007, the 400 entries for a June 7, 2008 taping of Pinks: All Out at Summit Racing Equipment Motorsports Park in Norwalk, Ohio, were filled in 12 minutes.

On January 6, 2008, the 400 entries for a July 25, 2008 taping of Pinks: All Out at Old Bridge Township Raceway Park in Englishtown, New Jersey, were filled in less than 1 minute.

Rockingham Dragway, which was the host for the taping of the "NEW" 2016 episodes aired on Outdoor Channel, reported a high number of registrations(500) forcing the producers to adjust the classes planned for each of three days of Pinks : All Out competition, effectively turning the fast class to 8–9:99 ET second class to 10–10:99 second ET class and the slowest 11–12:99 second class along with an added Motorcycle, ATV and Jr Dragster class as well.

== Production ==
Produced by Pullin Television- 2005 -2010

Produced by Boss One Media – 2015 to present

Original music is composed and performed by Max Carl

The Narrator in the opening sequence for PINKS! Racing, seasons 1 through 5 is Frank P. Montenegro

The Narrator for PINKS! ALL OUT, seasons 1 through 3 is Frank P. Montenegro

The Narrator for PINKS: ALL OUT 2015 to present Gavin Jerome

== Alumni ==
Famous Pinks participants have included:

- Kris Thorne, NHRA Pro Modified champion.
- Justin "Big Chief" Shearer (Street Outlaws)
- Dave Comstock (Street Outlaws)
- Jeff "AZN" Bonnett (Street Outlaws)
