= Sacramento Raceway Park =

Coordinates: 38.5277°N 121.2953°W

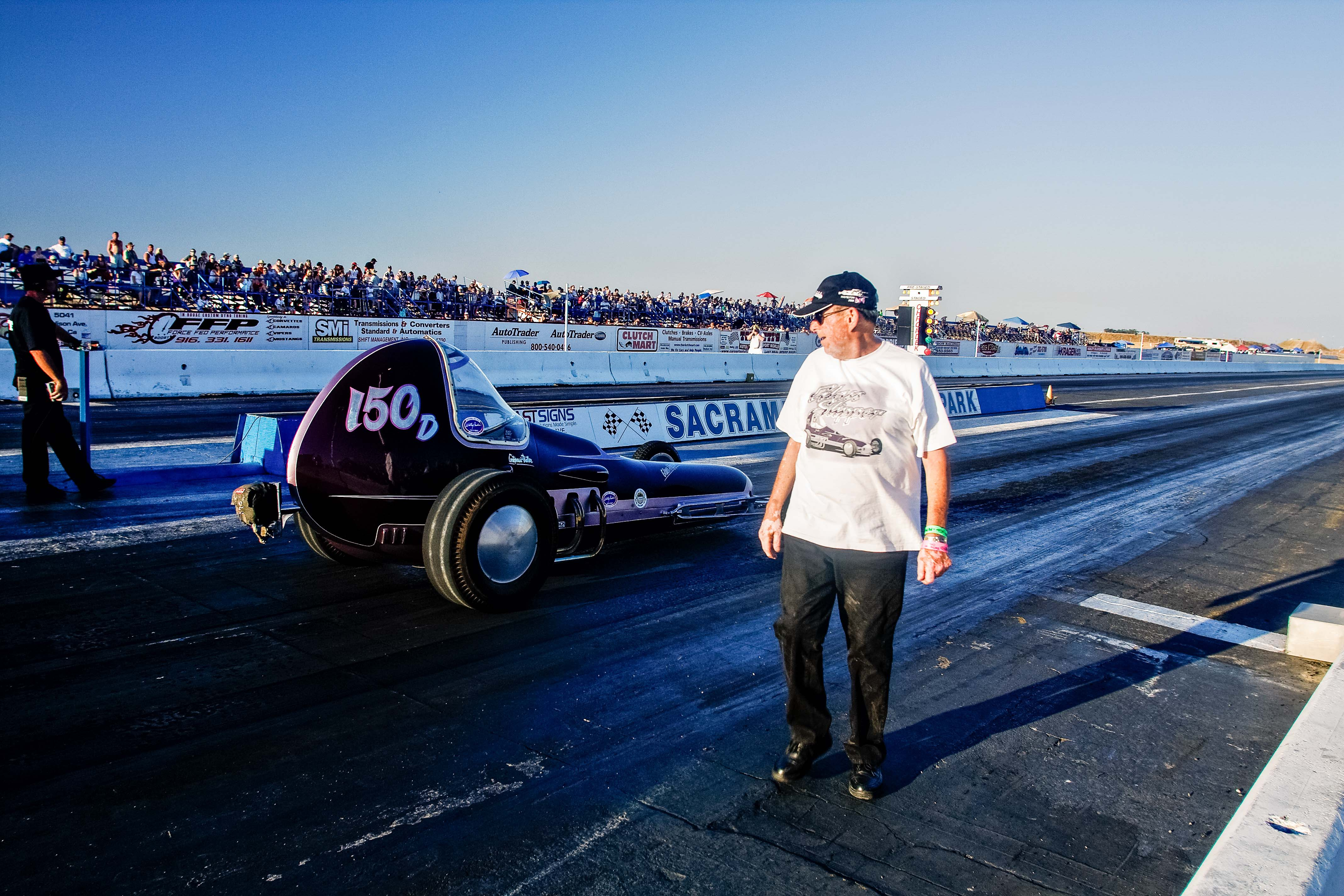
Glass Slipper lines up for a pass at Sacramento Raceway Park in 2009

Sacramento Raceway Park (SRP), commonly shortened to Sacramento Raceway or Sac Raceway, was a motorsports track on 198 acres (80 ha) near Rancho Cordova, California and the former Mather Air Force Base, known for holding weekly drag race events and annual Governors Cup Championship. It was completed in 1964 and the last races were held in November 2023.

== History ==
Vastine Smith built the first dragstrip at Sacramento Raceway Park in 1964, complete with a Christmas tree timing tower and two grandstands holding approximately 500 people in total; the site was in unincorporated Sacramento County east of Sacramento on Excelsior Road, just north of Jackson Highway and south of Mather Air Force Base. Betty Clark took over the management of the dragstrip in 1967 and renamed it Eldorado Raceway; later that year, Western Oil Development purchased the land and gave it its present name. Dave Smith leased SRP in early 1968 and operated weekly nighttime events after business hours: drag races on Wednesdays and Saturdays, and motocross on Sundays. He acquired the site in 1971.

By 2017, Dave Smith listed the site for sale at an asking price of $11 million, citing updated laws that would force operations to end by 2020. In September 2023, the owners of SRP announced they were in negotiations to sell the property to an undisclosed buyer, but would finish the 2023 racing season in November regardless of the sale status. The sale was completed on December 8.
