= Christmas tree (drag racing) =

Device used to start a drag races

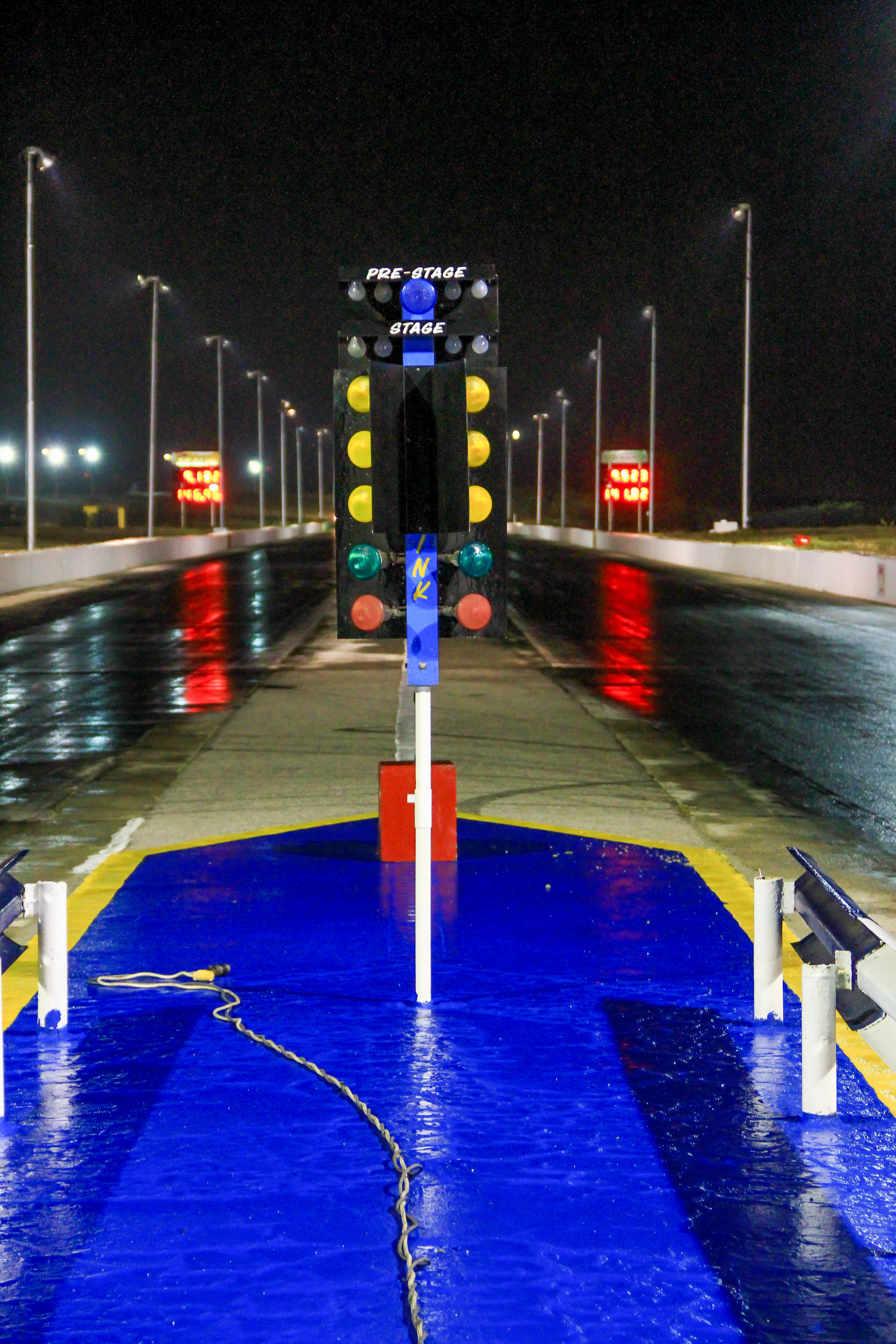
A pre-2011 CompuLink drag racing Christmas Tree as currently in use on the Curacao International Raceway.

Modern drag races are started electronically by a system known as a Christmas tree. A common Christmas tree consists of a column of seven lights for each driver or lane. Each side of the column of lights is the same. The current design of the Christmas Tree used at CompuLink venues for NHRA national events, which was first used in April 2011, consists, from the top down, of a blue LED light set (top and bottom halves), then three amber bulbs, then a green bulb and a red bulb. At other events, and non-CompuLink NHRA national events (and CompuLink prior to 2011), the function of the blue light set was performed by four smaller amber bulbs.

The lights are activated after the drivers are properly staged on the starting line by interrupting a set of two light beams across the track itself. One set is on the starting line, and the other set sits 7 in (180 mm) behind it.

== Light sequence ==
Christmas tree sequence
| Sequence | Name | Example | | Description |
| Sequence | Name | Typical | CL NHRA Natl | Description |
|---|---|---|---|---|
| 1 | Pre-Stage | | | Vehicles have advanced to the pre-staging point 7 in (180 mm) behind the starting line, breaking the first set of light beams on the track and activating the Christmas tree starting lights. |
| 2 | Stage | | | Vehicles are on the starting line, breaking the second set of light beams on the track. After one driver lights the staging lights, the other drivers must light their staging lights within seven seconds. |
| 3 | Countdown | | | The three large amber lights are used to count down. With a "standard" tree, they light sequentially with a 5/10 second delay in between; after the final light is lit, there is an additional 5/10 delay until the green light is lit. With a "professional" tree, all three light up simultaneously with a 4/10 second delay before the green light. In addition, in a standard tree with a handicap start, the light sequence starts for the slower car first, then the first light is turned on for the faster car after the difference between the two cars' dial-in is reached (for example, in a race between a 10.70 second car and an 11.30 second car, the first amber light is turned on in the lane with the 11.30 second car, and the sequence begins; the first amber light for the lane with the 10.70 second car is turned on .600 seconds later). |
| 4 | Go | | | The green light indicates a clean start, i.e., the vehicle did not advance past the starting line before the green light was lit. |
| F | Foul | | | The red light indicates a foul, generally triggered by moving over the starting line before the countdown is complete. |

=== Blue or small amber lights (staging) ===
CompuLink Christmas tree used at national events, 2011–present

Standard

Pro

When drivers are preparing to race, they move the vehicle and interrupt light beams 7 in (180 mm) behind the starting line. Crossing this beam activates the top half of the blue lights; or on CompuLink national trees prior to 2011 or any tree from another manufacturer, the top set of two small amber bulbs, labelled "Pre-Stage". At this point, with most modern starting lights, the tree is activated. Once pre-staged, drivers roll up an additional 7 in (180 mm) and interrupt the second beam, ensuring the front wheels stay behind the starting line, activating the bottom half of the blue lights or the lower two small amber bulbs, labelled "Stage".

After one driver activates stage lights (the bottom half of the blue lights or the lower set of small bulbs), the other driver(s) have seven seconds to follow suit and activate their stage lights, or they are timed out and automatically disqualified, even in qualifying (a red-light foul is ignored in qualifying). Once all drivers have crossed the staged sensor or are timed out, the automatic starting system will activate the next lighting sequence within 1.3 seconds of the last car being staged or being disqualified.

=== Large amber lights (countdown) ===
After this point, the lighting sequence will be different based on the type of tree and start that a race is using. The "Standard" or "Sportsman" tree will light up each large amber light consecutively with a 5/10 second delay in between them, then followed by the green light after another 5/10 second delay. A "Professional" tree will light up all of the large amber lights simultaneously, and then after a 4/10 second (except in Super Street, which is 5/10) second) delay, light up the green light.

=== Green (go) and red (foul) lights ===
Christmas tree. CompuLink trees from 1986–2011 and all non-CompuLink systems

Standard

Pro

On the activation of the green light from either style of tree, the drivers are supposed to start the race. The green light indicates the driver has not left the starting line early.

Leaving the "Staged" line before the green light activates will instantly stop the count down and result in a lighting of the red light, but not disqualification of the offending driver in heads-up starts only. In a Professional Tree or a Standard Tree with a heads-up start, if both drivers leave before the green light activates, only the first to leave will be charged with a red light. In a Standard Tree with staggered start times, a green light will be shown to the first driver, regardless if he jumped or not, and once the second driver takes the start, if one driver jumped the start, then that driver's lane will display the red light. If both drivers jump, only the driver whose infraction was worse will be shown the red light, as if it was a heads-up start.

A red light is not an immediate disqualification. In all situations where one driver caused a red light to be activated, if the driver that did not activate the red light in their lane commits a further foul during the run (crossing a lane boundary or hitting the barrier), and the driver who commits a red-light foul does not commit a further violation, the red light violation is overturned and the driver who crosses the boundary line is disqualified, with the driver who committed the red-light foul is declared the winner of the round. Both cars are disqualified if each crosses a boundary line, except in a final round, where only the first offender is tagged and the second car is automatically the winner. If one car crosses the boundary line to avoid an opponent who has entered his lane, that car is declared the winner by default.

However, if a driver leaves before the tree is activated (when the first yellow light is on), then that car is disqualified regardless of the actions of the other driver since it is the worse foul, meaning any red light or boundary line infraction by the opposing car is ignored. If both drivers leave before the tree is activated (two red lights showing), the steward at the start line and video evidence will be used to determine a winner. If it cannot be determined who left first, both cars are disqualified. If evidence shows one car caused the other to leave before the tree is activated, the first car is disqualified automatically, and all boundary line violations are ignored since the race did not legally begin and the first offender causes the second driver to be credited with an automatic competition single.

If a driver commits a foul start, the opponent does not have to complete the run, the driver simply has to make a legal pass to win. This includes shutting the engine off and not finishing the run.

== Origination ==
There continues to be controversy, even today, as to who the actual inventor of the Christmas Tree was. According to an article published in the September 13, 2013 issue of National Dragster, official magazine of the National Hot Rod Association (NHRA), it mentions in an old newspaper article from LaVerne, California, that Chrondek Corporation founder Oliver Riley was approached in 1962 by NHRA National Field Director Ed Eaton with an idea of a step-light countdown system. Research on a portable timing system was already in the works before this proposal. Due to the development of bracket racing in order to fill vehicle classes, where a slower car leaves ahead of the faster car during a pass, the slower car would begin further down the track from the other depending on elapsed time. The flagman (or starter) would stand a few feet ahead of the slower car, which caused a serious safety issue. Also, starting times by the flagman were not uniformly accurate. This new timing system would, hopefully, correct these problems. Dragtronics owner and NHRA Division 1 Director Lew Bond also helped with the development of the Christmas Tree, which was debuted by Chrondek at the 1963 U.S. Nationals in Indianapolis, Indiana.

Another claim regarding invention of the Christmas Tree is by Wilfred H. "W.H." David, Jr., founder of the Pel State Timing Association in Lafayette, Louisiana. He created the first Christmas Tree sometime in the late 1950s and sold the rights a few years later to Chrondek Corporation for mass production. The naming apparently came from the use of small glass Christmas tree lights David used for his miniature prototype.

== Tree changes ==
Christmas tree, 1963-86

Standard

Pro (1971)

The Christmas Tree has changed three times since its original debut in 1963 for the U.S. Nationals at Indianapolis Raceway Park. The original Tree had five amber lights, but no pre-stage or stage bulbs. A pair of small amber bulbs, originally located at the start line, known as the pre-stage and stage bulbs, were added in 1964 Winternationals, held at the Los Angeles Fairplex (which still conducts the races today). The small staging bulbs were gradually moved from the track to the Tree over several seasons. Each of the five yellow lights were lit consecutively at a .500 delay before the light turned green.

For the 1971 season, the Professional Tree was instituted; only the fifth of five yellow bulbs (the last) was lit, followed by four-tenths of a second later, the green light, for professional classes. As the Pro Stock class was having issues with hood scoops obscuring the bottom amber light, which was the only light lit before the green light, the NHRA instituted the first major overhaul of the Tree in 1986: two amber lights were removed on each side, giving the tree three amber lights before green. The NHRA said they could save around four minutes with the reduction of starts by one second in sportsman classes. The second change was made in the Professional tree configuration. All three amber lights turn on together before the tree turns green.

NHRA introduced another significant change to the Tree, switching to LEDs instead of incandescent bulbs, at Pomona in 2003. This saved changing as many as twenty bulbs at a meet due to filaments being broken by the vibration from exhausts of Top Fuel cars. It also led to a drop in reaction times.

Prior to the 2009 season, the starter activated the tree. The NHRA and drivers discovered drivers were aware when the NHRA official would trigger the switch after both cars were staged, so code was written to create a random delay between the second car staged and the lights starting in order to prevent drivers from "guessing" the tree activation.

Prior to the 2011 Charlotte spring race, the small amber bulbs were replaced with the current blue bulb. For the Charlotte and starting in 2018, Las Vegas, spring races, there are four horizontally-aligned blue bulbs, representing the four lanes (Charlotte and Las Vegas April races are four-lane races). Two weeks later at Royal Purple Raceway in Baytown, Texas, the current standard Christmas Tree was adopted, with only two blue bulbs for the two lanes.

Starting in 2016 for selected bracket races, CompuLink debuted the TruStart system for staggered start races. Prior to that, if the first driver left before the green, the light turned red automatically and the other driver was shown a green light, regardless of the infraction.

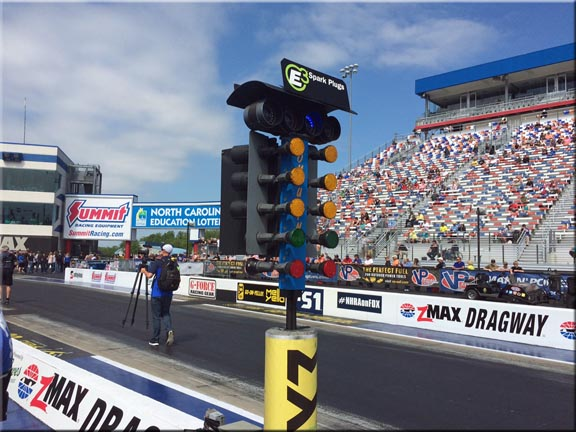
The four-lane LED CompuLink Christmas Tree with blue staging bulbs (post-2011) currently in use at zMax Dragway near Charlotte, North Carolina.

== Timing system manufacturers ==
Since 1984, the NHRA officially uses CompuLink timing systems at venues on their professional drag racing circuit (includes the Christmas Tree, control units, timing sensors, cables, program software and time slip printer). Many divisional tracks for both the NHRA and IHRA also use CompuLink, but current timing system manufacturers of similar operations including Accutime, TSI, PortaTree and RaceAmerica among others can be seen at various drag strips throughout the world so long as these timing systems comply to rules and regulations set forth by the respective drag racing organizations for which they are members. There are still a few drag strips which continue to use the much older Chrondek timing system, although the company was sold to Daktronics in the 1980s and parts for that system are no longer made. Most drag racing time scoreboards currently seen at the tracks are provided by Daktronics, RaceAmerica or Accutime. In the 2026 NHRA Mission Foods Drag Racing Series season, two NHRA venues (US 131 Motorsports Park and Rockingham Dragway) use the older style Accutime trees instead of the modern CompuLink tree.
