= 2026 NHRA Mission Foods Drag Racing Series =

North American drag racing season

2026 NHRA Mission Foods Drag Racing Series season

Season
- Races: 20
- Start date: March 8
- End date: November 15

Awards
- Drivers' champion: Shawn Langdon (Top Fuel); J.R. Todd (Funny Car); Dallas Glenn (Pro Stock); Gaige Herrera (Pro Stock Motorcycle)
- Rookie of the Year: Maddi Gordon (Top Fuel)

w

The 2026 NHRA Mission Foods Drag Racing Series season was announced back on August 28, 2025.

It was the 71st season of the National Hot Rod Association's top drag racing competition. This season also celebrated the 75th anniversary of the NHRA from their founding. The NHRA held 20 national events this season. Top Fuel, Funny Car and Pro Stock competed in all 20 events, which was one (Top Fuel and Funny Car) and three (Pro Stock Car) more than in the 2025 season. Pro Stock Motorcycle competed at 14 events, which for them it was the same as 2025 campaign. There was also All-Star Call Out races for each of the 4 pro classes, which were based on a format used by the Discovery television program Street Outlaws: No Prep Kings, where the drivers select their opponents in early rounds. Nineteen tracks hosted NHRA races, including three new national event tracks in well-established drag racing markets and one hosting its first ever national event but on the schedule for the first time since 1998. On December 12, 2025, Maple Grove Raceway owner Kenny Koretsky announced his intentions to sell the track to the IHRA, removing Maple Grove from the map after 40 years. The NHRA promptly announced on December 15, 2025 that U. S. 131 Motorsports Park in Martin, Michigan would replace Maple Grove on the Mission Foods Drag Racing Series schedule.

The 2026 season also was the first since John Force announced his retirement late in the prior year after more than 40 years as a driver. In addition, Brittany Force announced in 2025 she would be stepping away from her Top Fueler to start a family. Replacing her for 2026 was Josh Hart. After the conclusion of the 2025 season, the Prock family announced a surprise exit from John Force Racing, with Jordan Vandergriff being named to drive the Cornwell Tools Funny Car on December 12, 2025, during the Performance Racing Industry (PRI) trade show. In January 2026, the Prock family announced their move to Tasca Racing, with Austin driving Bob Tasca III's Ford Mustang for 2026. JFR also announced that Alexis DeJoria would be joining the team in a 3rd Funny Car, ending her tenure at JCM after 1 year.

In order to join JFR, Josh Hart sold off his personally owned Top Fuel team, Josh Hart Racing, over to Richard Freeman, who was the owner of the Pro Stock powerhouse, Elite Motorsports. Freeman then announced a technical alliance with Tony Stewart Racing, and that the dragster would be driven by Tony Stewart himself, as Leah Pruett would return to the Top Fuel seat at TSR after 2 seasons away. In a move many months in the making, Ron Capps Motorsports will be expanding to enter a Top Fuel car in 2026, with Maddi Gordon behind the wheel. In another expansion move, SCAG Racing announced the addition of another Top Fuel car to be driven by Will Smith.

The Top Fuel Call Out, which was held at the Gatornationals, had their field set on November 1, 2025, which was at the conclusion of the Nevada Nationals, the last professional race qualifying session of the 2025 season. Champion Doug Kalitta won the top seed and called out his opponent among Shawn Langdon (No. 2), Justin Ashley (No. 3), Tony Stewart (No. 5), Clay Millican (No. 6), Steve Torrence (No. 7, may skip the event; would be replaced by Josh Hart, No. 10), Shawn Reed (No. 8), and Antron Brown (No. 9, replaces Brittany Force, who retired).

== Schedule ==
The national event schedule was released on August 28, 2025. Then that was followed up by the Pro Stock & Pro Stock Motorcycle classes as well the Callouts all getting confirmed on October 2, 2025. The schedule was then revised when Rockingham was added on November 10, 2025. Then following the sale of Maple Grove Raceway announced December 12, 2025, that was followed by the NHRA removing the track on December 15, 2025, and they announced their replacement. The TV schedule was added to this page on February 13, 2026 the same day it was announced.

2026 NHRA Mission Foods Drag Racing Series Schedule
Date	Race	Site	TV	Winners			
Date	Race	Site	TV	Top Fuel	Funny Car	Pro Stock	Pro Stock Motorcycle
March 5–8	AMALIE Motor Oil NHRA Gatornationals ^{TFCO}	Gainesville Raceway; Gainesville, Florida	FS1	Josh Hart (I)	Chad Green (I)	Matt Hartford (I)	Richard Gadson (I)
March 20–22	FMP NHRA Arizona Nationals Presented By NGK Spark Plugs	Firebird Motorsports Park; Chandler, Arizona	FS1	Shawn Langdon (I)	Ron Capps (I)	Dallas Glenn (I)	N/A (Note: Pro Stock Motorcycle did not compete at this event.)
April 9–12	Lucas Oil NHRA Winternationals	In-N-Out Burger Pomona Dragstrip; Pomona, California	FS1	Tony Stewart (I)	Matt Hagan (I)	Greg Anderson (I)	N/A
April 24–26	NHRA 4-Wide Nationals ^{4 Lanes}	zMAX Dragway; Concord, North Carolina	FS1	Doug Kalitta (I)	Ron Capps (II)	Matt Hartford (II)	Gaige Herrera (I)
May 1–3	NHRA Southern Nationals	South Georgia Motorsports Park; Adel, Georgia	FS1	Shawn Langdon (II)	Jordan Vandergriff (I)	Dallas Glenn (II)	Matt Smith (I)
May 14–17	Gerber Collision & Glass Route 66 NHRA Nationals Presented By PEAK	Route 66 Raceway; Joliet, Illinois	FS1	Shawn Langdon (III)	Chad Green (II)	Aaron Stanfield (I)	Matt Smith (II)
May 29–31	NHRA Potomac Nationals Presented By JEGS	Maryland International Raceway; Mechanicsville, Maryland	FOX	Shawn Langdon (IV)	Austin Prock (I)	Greg Anderson (II)	Angie Smith (I)
June 5–7	NHRA New England Nationals Presented By bproauto (Note: Because of rain the Top Fuel and Funny Car winners got decided on Friday in Bristol during the 2nd qualifying session)	New England Dragway; Epping, New Hampshire	FOX	Leah Pruett (I)	Jack Beckman (I)	Dallas Glenn (III)	N/A
June 12–14	Super Grip NHRA Thunder Valley Nationals	Bristol Dragway; Bristol, Tennessee	FS1	Antron Brown (I)	Matt Hagan (II)	Matt Hartford (III)	Gaige Herrera (II)
June 25–28	Summit Racing Equipment NHRA Nationals ^{PSCO}	Summit Motorsports Park; Norwalk, Ohio	FOX	Maddi Gordon (I)	Ron Capps (III)	Aaron Stanfield (II)	Richard Gadson (II)
July 17–19	DENSO NHRA Sonoma Nationals Presented By PowerEdge ^{PSMCO}	Sonoma Raceway; Sonoma, California	FS1	Doug Kallita (II)	Jordan Vandergriff (II)	Greg Stanfield (I)	NC (Note: Non-championship speciality event for Pro Stock Motorcycle with only the top eight in the speciality round points participating.)
July 24–26	Muckleshoot Casino Resort NHRA Northwest Nationals	Pacific Raceways; Kent, Washington	FOX	Doug Kallita (III)	J.R. Todd (I)	Greg Anderson (III)	N/A
August 20–23	NHRA Brainerd Nationals	Brainerd International Raceway; Brainerd, Minnesota	FS1	Doug Kallita (IV)	Matt Hagan (III)	Greg Anderson (IV)	N/A
September 2–7	Cornwell Quality Tools NHRA U.S. Nationals ^{1.5} ^{FCCO}	Lucas Oil Indianapolis Raceway Park; Brownsburg, Indiana	FS1 & FOX	Shawn Langdon (V)	Jack Beckman (II)	Dallas Glenn (IV)	Matt Smith (III)
Countdown to the Championship
September 17–21	Dodge NHRA Great Lakes Nationals Presented By MOPAR (Note: Because of rain this race finished on a Monday)	US 131 Motorsports Park; Martin, Michigan	FS1	Shawn Langdon (VI)	Jordan Vandergriff (III)	Troy Coughlin Jr. (I)	John Hall (I)
September 25–27	NHRA Nationals at The Rock	Rockingham Dragway, Rockingham, North Carolina	FS1	Shawn Langdon (VII)	Matt Hagan (IV)	Greg Stanfield (II)	Richard Gadson (III)
October 2–4	NAPA Auto Parts NHRA Midwest Nationals	World Wide Technology Raceway; Madison, Illinois	FOX (Note: This race was regionalized depending on when viewers got an NFL game October 4 so it was shown at 2 pm eastern or 4:30 pm eastern)	Shawn Langdon (VIII)	Austin Prock (II)	Aaron Stanfield (III)	Gaige Herrera (III)
October 14–18	Texas NHRA FallNationals	Texas Motorplex; Ennis, Texas	FS1	Antron Brown (II)	J.R. Todd (II)	Dallas Glenn (V)	Matt Smith (IV)
October 29 – November 1	MOPAR NHRA Las Vegas Nationals Powered By Dodge (Note: Due to high winds the Pro Stock Motorcycle winner was not awarded until the Ponoma Finals)	Las Vegas Motor Speedway; Las Vegas, Nevada	FS1	Doug Kalitta (V)	Jordan Vandergriff (IV)	Dallas Glenn (VI)	Gaige Herrera (IV)
November 12–15	In-N-Out Burger NHRA Finals ^{1.5}	In-N-Out Burger Pomona Dragstrip; Pomona, California	FS1	Doug Kalitta (VI)	J.R. Todd (III)	Dallas Glenn (VII)	Gaige Herrera (V)

=== Schedule Changes ===
The 2026 schedule features several key changes to it. The Winternationals in Pomona was pushed back two weeks from its 2025 date. Sonoma and Seattle swapped dates from 2024.

The Las Vegas race in April was removed and it got replaced by a round in Adel, Georgia at South Georgia Motorsports Park, 2,200 miles east. It will be the first NHRA event in Georgia since 2021, as well as the return of the Southern Nationals which was previously held at Atlanta Dragway, one of four former NHRA national event circuits Darryl H. Cuttell, owner of a rival sanctioning body, acquired in the off-season.

The DMV race moves from Virginia Motorsports Park (also acquired by Cuttell from the Franklin family) to Maryland International Raceway in Mechanicsville, Maryland, which is 117 miles north of Dinwiddie.

The race that was in Mohnton, Pennsylvania, from Maple Grove Raceway was removed after the Koretsky family also sold their track to Cuttell. Then it was that announced U. S. 131 Motorsports Park, on December 11, 2025, would become an NHRA-sanctioned track, with that followed by an announcement that it was the replacement on December 15, 2025 for the series schedule.

The fall North Carolina race moves from Concord over to Rockingham Dragway, which is 82 miles southeast in Rockingham, North Carolina.

The Las Vegas race was a standard two-lane race, making the April Charlotte round the only four-lane race in the season.

=== Additional rules for specially marked races ===
4 Lanes: The National event in Charlotte will compete with cars in four lanes.

- All cars will qualify on each lane as all four lanes will be used in qualifying.
- Three rounds with cars using all four lanes.
- In Rounds One and Two, the top two drivers (of four) will advance to the next round.
- The pairings are set as follows:
  - Race One: 1, 8, 9, 16
  - Race Two: 4, 5, 12, 13
  - Race Three: 2, 7, 10, 15
  - Race Four: 3, 6, 11, 14
  - Semifinal One: Top two in Race One and Race Two
  - Semifinal Two: Top two in Race Three and Race Four
  - Finals: Top two in Semifinal One and Semifinal Two
- Lane choice is determined by times in the previous round. In first round, lane choice determined by fastest times.
- Drivers who advance in Rounds One and Two will receive 20 points for each round advancement.
- In Round Three, the winner of the race will be declared the race winner and will collect 40 points. The runner-up will receive 20 points. Third and fourth place drivers will be credited as semifinal losers.

1.5: The U.S. Nationals and In-N-Out Burger Finals will have their race points increased by 50% . Drivers who qualify but are eliminated in the first round receive 30 points, and each round win is worth 30 points. The top four receive 10, 9, 8, and 7 points, respectively, for qualifying positions, with the 5–6 drivers receiving 6 points, 7–8 drivers receiving 5 points, 9–12 receiving 4 points, and 13–16 receiving 3 points. Also, the top four, not three, drivers after each session receive points for fastest times in each round (4-3-2-1).

TF/FC/PS/PSM CO: All-Star Call Out competition for that category.

== Mission #2Fast2Tasty NHRA Challenge ==
The Mission #2Fast2Tasty NHRA Challenge was a collaboration that was created between both the NHRA and Mission Foods as it was introduced in the 2023 NHRA Camping World Drag Racing Series season. The challenge spices up Saturday qualifying schedule at regular-season events. Semifinalists from the previous race compete anew, culminating in a final during the last qualifying session. Winners gain a purse, as well as bonus points. At the U. S. Nationals (Monday finals), the event takes place on Saturday.

Bonus points are awarded as follows:

- Winner (3)
- Runner-up (2)
- Quickest losing semifinalist (1)

Bonus points earned from the challenge will be added to a driver’s total points at the start of the Countdown to the Championship playoffs.

2026 Mission #2FAST2TASTY Challenge Schedule
Date	Race	Winners			
Date	Race	Top Fuel	Funny Car	Pro Stock	Pro Stock Motorcycle
March 21	FMP NHRA Arizona Nationals Presented By NGK Spark Plugs	Doug Kalitta (I)	J.R. Todd (I)	Dallas Glenn (I)	N/A (Note: Vehicle class did not compete at this event.)
April 11	Lucas Oil NHRA Winternationals	Doug Kalitta (II)	Matt Hagan (I)	Dallas Glenn (II)	N/A
April 25	NHRA 4-Wide Nationals	Clay Millican (I)	Jordan Vandergriff (I)	Greg Anderson (I)	Gaige Herrera (I)
May 2	NHRA Southern Nationals	Not Held (Note: Late Friday night weather and a long delay in track drying and maintenance forced cancellation of the challenge.)			
May 16	Gerber Collision & Glass NHRA Route 66 Nationals Presented By PEAK	Shawn Langdon (I)	Alexis DeJoria (I)	Erica Enders (I)	Gaige Herrera (II)
May 30	NHRA Potomac Nationals Presented By JEGS	Shawn Langdon (II)	Austin Prock (I)	Aaron Stanfield (I)	Angie Smith (I)
June 6	NHRA New England Nationals Presented By bproauto	Doug Kalitta (III)	Jordan Vandergriff (II)	Greg Anderson (II)	N/A
June 13	Super Grip NHRA Thunder Valley Nationals	Doug Kalitta (IV)	Jordan Vandergriff (III)	Matt Hartford (I)	Richard Gadson (I)
June 27	Summit Racing Equipment NHRA Nationals	Shawn Langdon (III)	Austin Prock (II)	ASCO (Note: Class will not participate in the Challenge at this round because of the class All-Star Call Out taking place)	Richard Gadson (II)
July 18	DENSO NHRA Sonoma Nationals Presented By PowerEdge	Shawn Langdon (IV)	Ron Capps (I)	Dallas Glenn (III)	ASCO
July 25	Muckleshoot Casino Resort NHRA Northwest Nationals	Antron Brown (I)	Daniel Wilkerson (I)	Greg Stanfield (I)	N/A
August 22	NHRA Brainerd Nationals	Doug Kalitta (V)	J.R. Todd (II)	Greg Anderson (III)	N/A
September 5	Cornwell Quality Tools NHRA U.S. Nationals	Leah Pruett (I)	Austin Prock (III)	Cody Anderson (I)	Gaige Herrera (III)
Overall Winners		Doug Kalitta	Austin Prock	Greg Anderson	Gaige Herrera
