= Evans Tuning =

Evans Tuning, LLC.
- Company type: Private Company
- Industry: Automotive
- Founded: 2004
- Headquarters: Mount Bethel, Pennsylvania, United States
- Services: EFI Tuning, Fabrication, Engine Building
- Website: www.evans-tuning.com

Evans Tuning, LLC is an automotive engine tuning, and aftermarket modification shop that specializes in the reprogramming of engine control units (ECUs), to provide a smooth driving experience and safe engine conditions after modifications to a stock automotive configuration have been performed.

== Overview ==
The company was founded in 2004 by Jeffrey Evans and is located in Mount Bethel, Pennsylvania. The company was initially started in Easton, PA and in late 2009 moved to its current location in Mount Bethel. Additionally, the company started by only performing service to modified Honda and Acura models. Mid 2004, the company purchased its first 2WD Dynapack Dynomometer (dyno) and began their in-house dyno tuning operations. In early 2009 an additional 2WD Dynapack Dyno was purchased expanding their operation into an AWD dyno shop.

== Tuning Services ==
=== Dyno Tuning ===
Evans Tuning's dyno tuning service requires the car to be present for tuning. After a car has been put on the dyno it can be tuned (usually in real-time) and air/fuel ratios, timing, cam angles, and other adjustments can be made to optimize the engine. All of these tuning services are included with the standard tuning rate (which varies depending on the car and tuning system used).

The use of a Dynapack Dyno requires the wheels to be removed prior to tuning. Adapters are then bolted onto the wheel hubs using lug nuts to properly center them. The dyno is then connected to the adapters and locked into place.

=== eTuning ===
Evans Tuning began eTuning in February 2010. The eTuning service was discontinued in late 2014.

== Drag Racing ==
=== 2011 ===
Evans Tuning began drag racing again in 2011 after taking 4 racing seasons off with a 95 Acura Integra built for the True Street Class. The car was built for 2 years by Jeffrey Evans before it was ready for competition. It made its debut in the 4th Annual $10,000 Outlaw FWD Shootout with Brian Ballard driving during Fall Nationals at Old Bridge Township Raceway Park in Englishtown, NJ.

| Dates | Event | Track | Class | Car | Driver | Qualified | Best E.T. | Best MPH | Final position |
|---|---|---|---|---|---|---|---|---|---|
| 10/1 - 10/2 | Fall Nationals | Old Bridge Township Raceway Park | Outlaw | 95 Integra | Brian Ballard | 10th | 9.247 | 164.59 | 8th |
| 11/5 - 11/6 | World Cup Finals | Maryland International Raceway | True Street | 95 Integra | Jeffrey Evans | 1st | 8.980 | 167.34 | DNF |

==== Record and Crash ====
Jeffrey Evans was able to set a record in the class running an 8.980 @ 167.34MPH during the first round of qualifying and on the 3rd full power pass in the car. He was the first in the class to run an 8-second quarter mile at a True Street event in full legal race trim.

Control of the car was lost after it made it to the end of the track. The car swerved across lanes and crashed into the wall. Although Evans Tuning has said on their official Facebook page that they will compete it 2012, it is unknown whether this car will be repaired for next season.

=== 2012 ===
Evans Tuning is building a new race car based on the Honda EK hatchback chassis for the 2012 season. The car debuted at World Cup Finals at Maryland International Raceway piloted by Andrea Evans but had issues preventing it from running.

=== 2013 ===
The Evans Tuning True Street Civic made its first appearance of the 2013 season at Maryland International Raceway piloted by Andrea Evans.

| Dates | Event | Track | Class | Car | Driver | Qualified | Best E.T. | Best MPH | Final position |
|---|---|---|---|---|---|---|---|---|---|
| 8/25 | Summer IREV | Maryland International Raceway | True Street | 98 Civic | Andrea Evans | 1st | 9.21 | 164 | 2nd |
