= Glass Slipper (dragster) =

Body and chassis
- Body style: Streamliner dragster

Powertrain
- Engine: Injected small-block Chevy

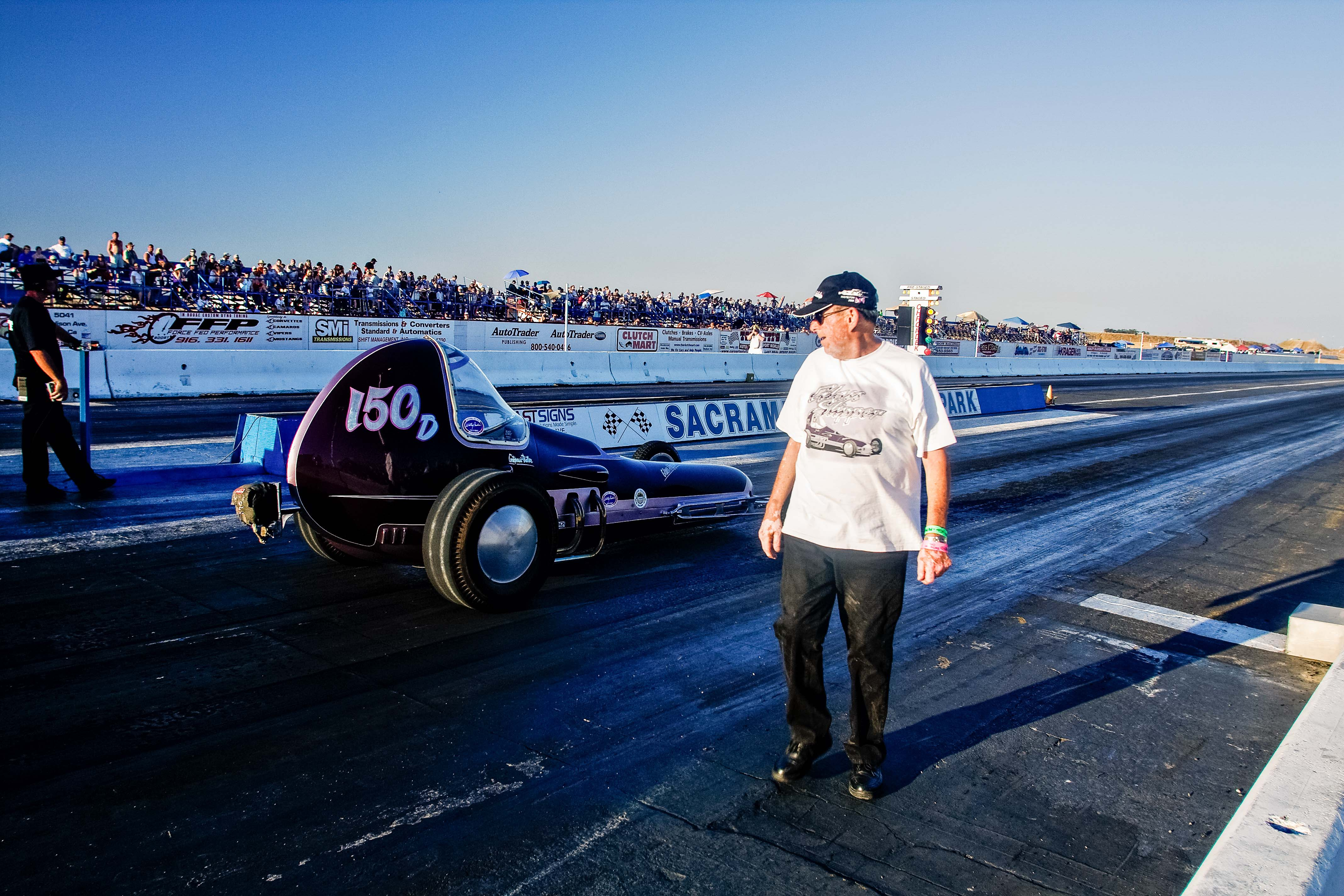
Glass Slipper at Sacramento Raceway

Glass Slipper is a pioneering streamliner dragster.

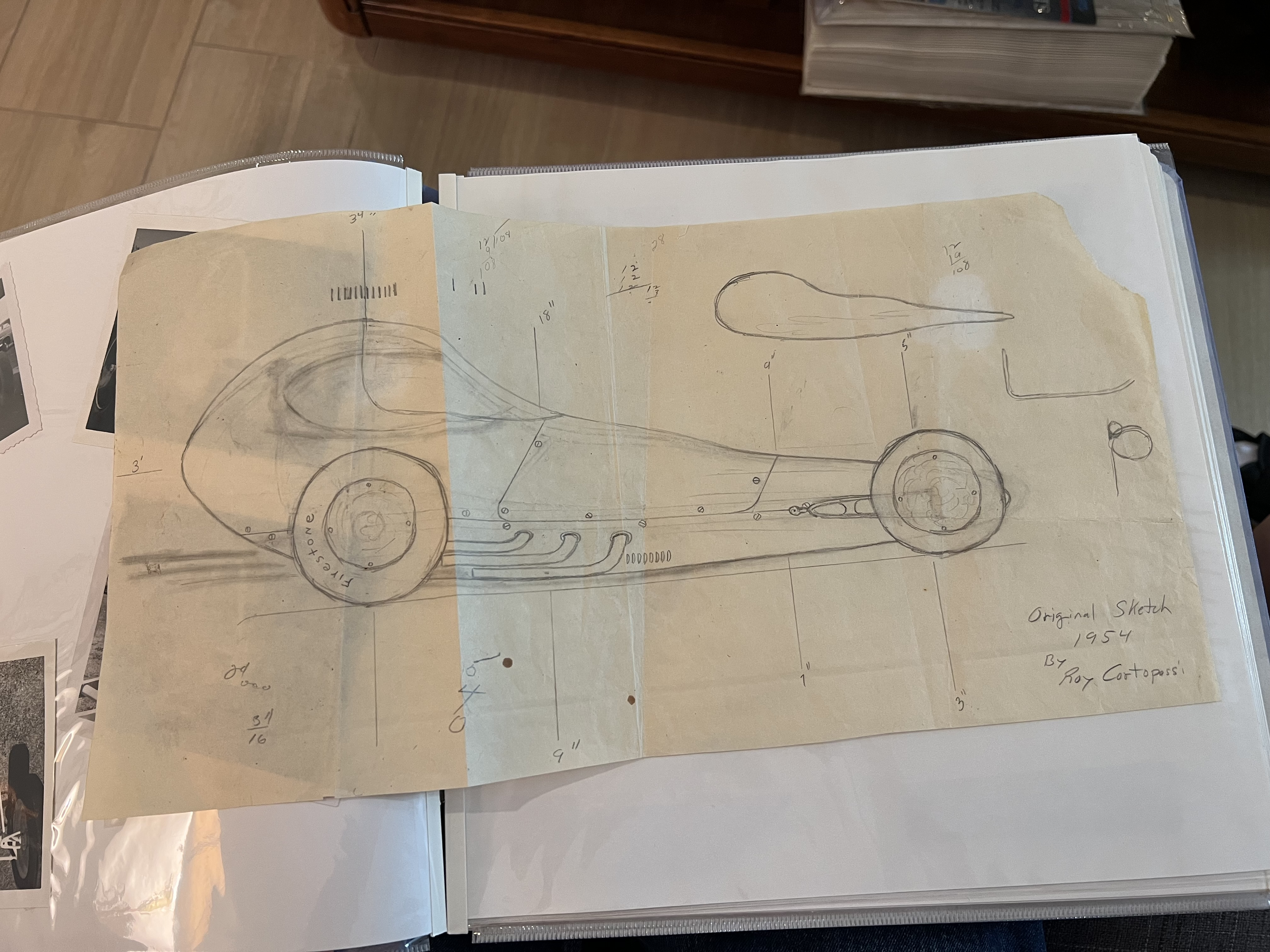
The original 1954 pencil conceptual sketch by Roy Cortopassi for the 'Glass Slipper' streamliner, demonstrating the early influence of aviation aerodynamics on drag racing design.

Making her debut in 1957, Glass Slipper was created by Califironia drag racers Roy and Ed Cortopassi. The workmanship was so good, she won "America's Most Beautiful Competition Car" at the 1957 Oakland Roadster Show.

Glass Slipper was a short-wheelbase front-engined digger with front hairpins, lakester-style wheel discs (Moon discs), covered frame rails, a closed cockpit, and exposed exhaust pipes, bearing a strong resemblance to a sprint car. She wore the livery of Capitol Speed Shop. She was powered by an injected small-block Chevy, distinguishing her from her blown contemporaries. She recorded a standing kilometer of 168.85 mph (271.74 km/h) under FIA International Acceleration Records at March Air Force Base in 1958.

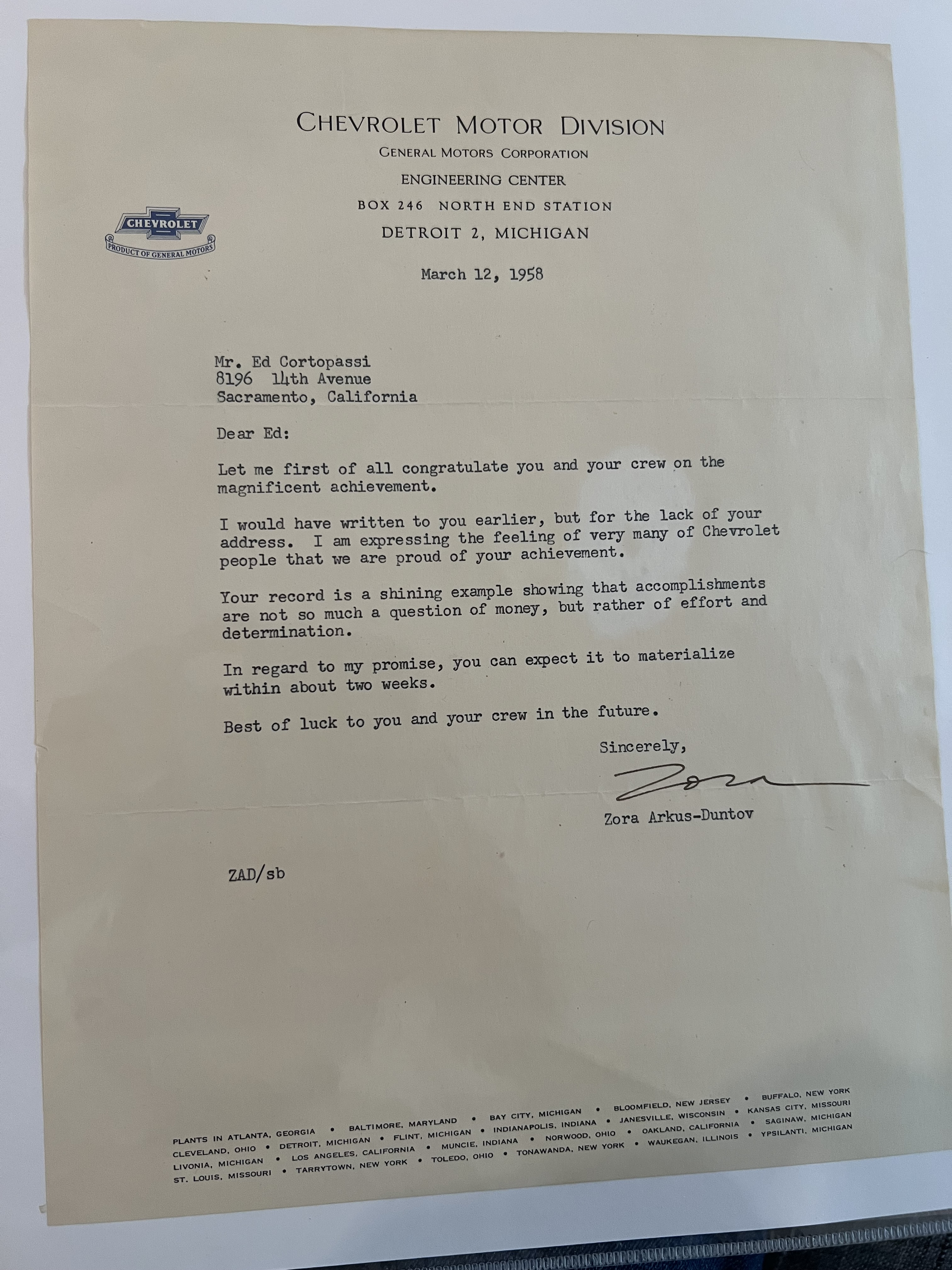
A March 1958 letter from Chevrolet engineer Zora Arkus-Duntov to racer Ed Cortopassi, acknowledging the Glass Slipper's performance records and alluding to unofficial factory support during the AMA racing ban.

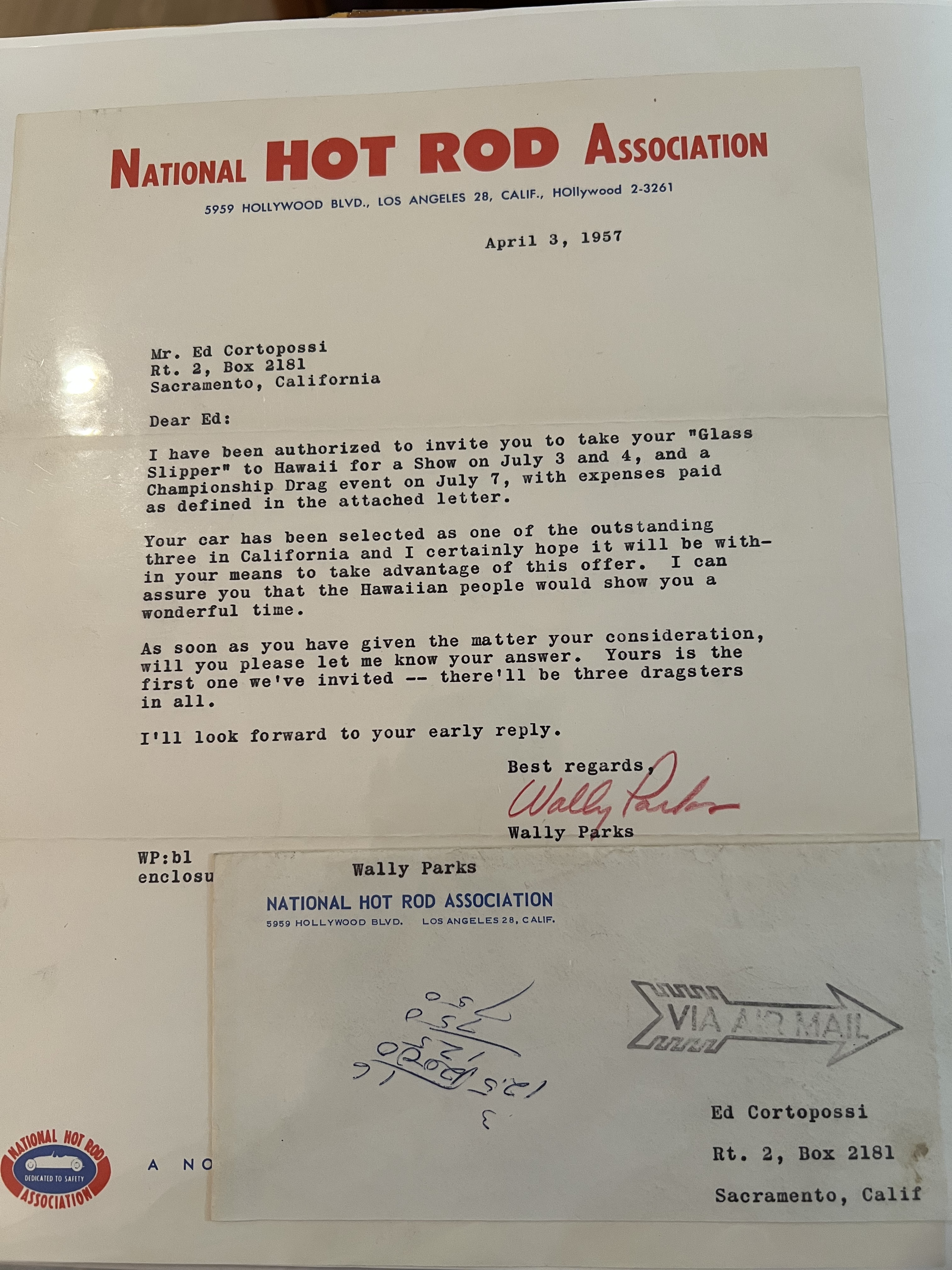
A 1957 letter from NHRA founder Wally Parks to Ed Cortopassi, selecting the Glass Slipper as one of California's 'outstanding three' cars and inviting the team to tour Hawaii.

After a fire subsequent to the record effort, in 1960, Glass Slipper reappeared with a GMC supercharger and Hilborn injection. This enabled the dragster to set a best e.t. of 8.93 seconds and a best speed of 172 mph (277 km/h) at Vacaville, California. She was retired in 1961.

In the 1990s, the car was restored.
