= Sandbagging (racing) =

Sandbagging describes someone who underperforms (usually deliberately) in an event. The term has multiple uses, such as a driver who competes in an event in a series below their level of expertise to finish high. In bracket drag racing and short track motor racing when a racer has a dial-in time/qualifying speed much slower than the car can actually perform. The term can also be used to describe a fast driver who holds back during a race until just before the end, when they suddenly pass up through the field to win the event.

== Drag racing ==
The function of sandbagging is to guarantee a win by outperforming the slower opponent at first, and then hitting the brakes near the finish line in time to just barely beat the opponent. However, sandbaggers run the risk of beating their dial-in time, thus disqualifying them from the race. Sandbaggers must be experienced in controlling this technique, and therefore, it should not be attempted by beginners. Sandbagging faces much criticism, as many argue that it is essentially cheating. In most bracket racing and some higher heads-up sportsman classes (the exception is Competition Eliminator, where a violation results in the index time being adjusted), rules discourage sandbagging by making breaking out the lowest level foul where if one driver breaks out provided no further foul occurs, the opponent wins, and if both break out, the car closer to the index wins. Most classes feature an absolute breakout time based on class (6.000 in Top Sportsman or Top Dragster), chassis certification (chassis certification for cars faster than 6.000, 7.500, or 10.000), or driver licencing limits (7.500 and 10.000), which results in an automatic disqualification and points penalty if that car or driver exceeds the absolute time.

=== Example ===
Racer A has a car that consistently runs a quarter-mile drag race in 12 seconds. Racer A gives a dial-in time of 15 seconds, therefore claiming that the car is 3 seconds slower than it actually is. Racer A goes against Racer B in an E.T. bracket race. In bracket races, both racers are supposedly equal since both have similar times. However, Racer B has an accurate dial-in time of 15 seconds while Racer A has an inaccurate dial-in time that gives Racer A the advantage. During the race, Racer A gets a clear advantage off the starting line. But to not be disqualified by racing faster than the dial-in time, Racer A slows near the finish line to just barely beat Racer B.

In the NHRA's three fixed-index categories, Super Comp (8.90 seconds), Super Gas (9.90 seconds), or Super Street (10.90 seconds), cars are often faster than the class limit. Drivers will deliberately be slow on the start and accelerate the car as it goes down the track, hoping to be as close to the index.

== Short track racing ==
The term is frequently used in for deliberately qualifying poorly at short track racing events. Some tracks/series start the fastest qualifiers at the rear of the field and the slowest qualifiers at the front of the field. So faster cars sometimes deliberately qualify poorly so they have to pass fewer cars (and only slower cars). To counteract sandbagging, tracks and series often invert some of the fastest qualifiers and start slower cars behind them. The number of cars to be inverted are typically not known to the drivers as they qualify, and often the fastest qualifier (who wins a cash bonus) will typically participate in a random drawing to determine the number of inverted cars after qualifying has concluded. Other tracks give bonus points to the fastest qualifier(s), which can drastically affect end of season awards. Still other tracks use "passing points" to reward the most cars passed in a heat race with a better chance to advance to the feature.

Usually, the sandbagging is used only in shorter races where a pit stop is not used, such as heat races and in feature races of fewer than 100 laps in a United States Auto Club or World of Outlaws event. In most races of 125 laps or greater where a pit stop is required, inversion of fields is impossible because pit strategy negates the need for the inversion.

To prevent sandbagging in World of Outlaws sprint car races, the winner and runner-up in each heat race, along with the two fastest qualifiers who have qualified for the feature but are not one of the top two drivers, participate in a short heat race-length race that determines the starting order for the first ten (or twelve if there are five heat races) starting positions in the feature.

== Demolition derby ==
In demolition derby, a driver may hit other cars weakly or avoid contact with other cars to lessen the damage to their cars to ensure better odds of surviving to win the derby as the last car running. Events often require a car to hit another car within a certain time limit, usually every 120 seconds or less, or be disqualified.

== Rallying ==
In some rallying series such as the World Rally Championship, the starting order in each race leg is determined by the overall standings of the previous leg. Because some track surfaces are faster once a few cars have passed, leading drivers may slow down in the final meters of the last stage of the first (and sometimes second) leg of the race and therefore let others clean the track the next leg.

== BMX racing ==
In BMX racing in the US, there are typically three levels of proficiency for amateur riders (ABA: Novice, Intermediate, Expert; NBL: Rookie, Novice, Expert). Generally, a racer is considered to be sandbagging when they deliberately avoid winning races, thus avoiding so-called "move up points" (which require a rider to race the next highest proficiency after a given number of races won). Sandbagging in BMX Racing is often practiced to ensure the rider stays at a lower proficiency long enough to compete in the NBL or ABA Grand National (held each year in September and November, respectively). This race is traditionally when year-end titles and awards are decided. Deliberate sandbagging is difficult to prove and, though track personnel have the authority to report such activity to their respective sanctioning body, disciplinary action or involuntary reclassification is seemingly quite rare. Sandbagging is a hotly debated issue in the BMX Racing community, and is such taboo that "call out threads" are sometimes started on message boards to publicly alert others in the community of a specific rider's conduct.

== Video games ==
Sandbagging is also prevalent in some racing games, particularly those that feature power-ups that either aid the user or hinder the opponent. In the Mario Kart video game series, players who are further behind have a higher chance to get the most powerful items. Players will sometimes sandbag to get items such as the Star or Lightning in order to batter the other racers, take shortcuts or defend themselves from other oncoming items. Team Race Sandbagging has become infamous with players holding back and getting the Lightning Item, which only affects racers on the opposing team, allowing the user's team to get a clear advantage. In Sonic & Sega All-Stars Racing, players may sandbag in order to get the powerful All-Star Moves, just to use them on the other players.

== RC car racing ==
In radio controlled car racing, participants can usually choose the classes in which they want to compete. Many tracks have levels such as rookie, sportsman, intermediate, and expert, for the same type of vehicle. So a driver may claim to be at the sportsman level when in fact they are easily fast enough to be competitive in intermediate, but they know they will have a much easier time winning if they compete in the lower class. This may happen more often at larger races that award trophies and other prizes, compared with local club races that usually award the winner only with a podium photo. Sandbagging is frowned upon by track owners and fellow competitors since it is clearly not a fair way to compete, so some race directors will bump someone up or ask them to move up if they feel they are in the wrong class. Some tracks have explicit rules where you have to bump up if you have won a certain number of races in one class. Often apparent sandbagging is not intentional, and is actually the result of someone sincerely misjudging their own skill level. This can happen if someone is new to the track and doesn't know their level in comparison to others, or if they have not competed for some time and are not sure they can immediately regain their previous skill level.
