= Rich Christensen =

American television producer

Rich Christensen is an American television producer from New Hampton, IA. Christensen went to school at the University of Northern Iowa. He is best known as the creator, lead executive producer and host of the racing shows Pinks and Pinks: All Out, the number two and three shows on the Speed Channel.
