= Maddi Gordon =

American drag racing driver (born 2004)

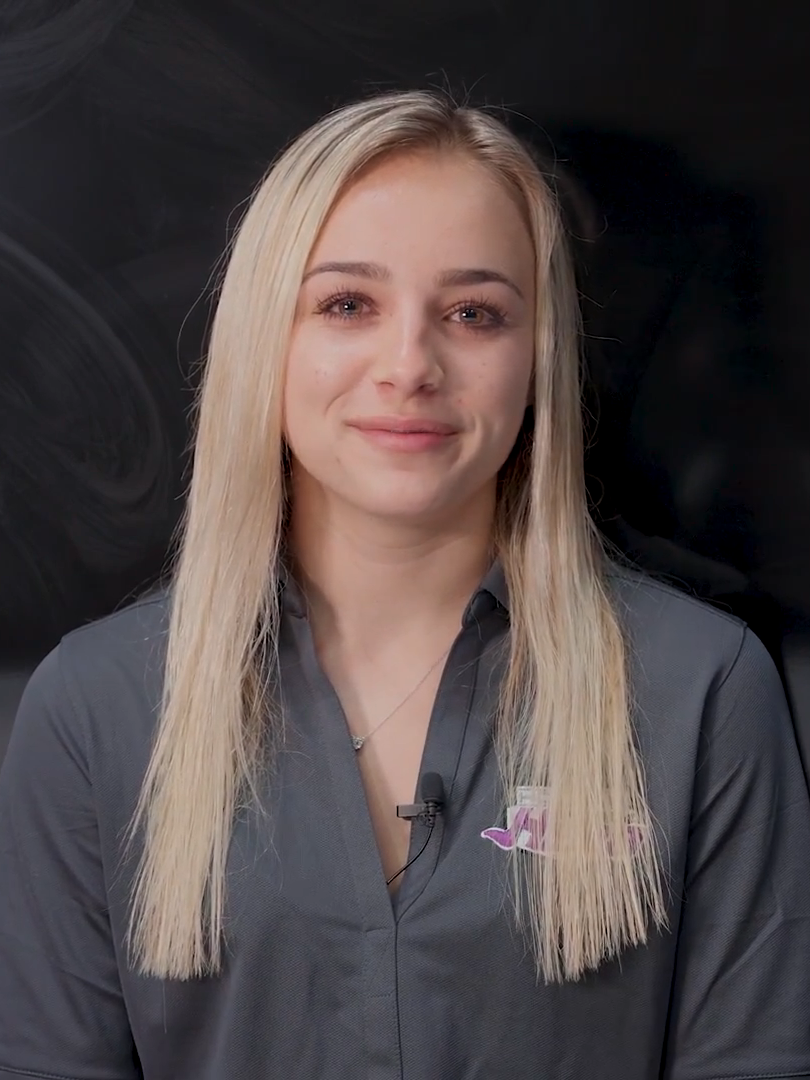
- Gordon in 2024
- Born: May 10, 2004 (age 22) Paso Robles, CA

NHRA Mission Foods Drag Racing Series career
- Debut season: 2026
- Current team: Ron Capps Motorsports
- Car number: 100
- Crew chief: Rob Flynn, Troy Fasching
- Championships: 1 (Top Alcohol Funny Car regional)
- Wins: Win Total; 3 (Top Alcohol Funny Car); 1 (Top Fuel Dragster); Final Round Appearances; 6 (Top Alcohol Funny Car)
- Fastest laps: Best ET; 3.734 seconds; Best Speed; 340.22 mph (547.53 km/h)
- Statistics up to date as of April 16, 2026.

Maddi Gordon (born May 10, 2004) is an American NHRA top fuel racer who drives for Ron Capps Motorsports.

Gordon made her top fuel NHRA debut in the 2026 Gatornationals, where she defeated Shawn Langdon and Tony Schumacher in elimination rounds before losing out to defending champion Doug Kalitta in the semifinals.

== Personal life ==
Gordon was born on May 10, 2004 to parents Doug and Kristina, and has a sister Macie. Her hometown is Paso Robles, California. Her father, Doug Gordon, is a three-time Top Alcohol Funny Car champion and won at Norwalk, OH, the same day Maddi earned her first Top Fuel victory on June 27, 2026.

== Motorsports career ==
=== Pre-top fuel debut ===
Gordon drove in several series before top fuel, succeeding in the Junior dragster, Top dragster, and Super comp series before racing in NHRA Top Alcohol Funny Car and becoming the 100th female racer to win an NHRA national event. On her debut, Gordon became the first ever third-generation NHRA Top Alcohol Funny Car driver.

=== NHRA top fuel ===
Gordon joined Ron Capps Motorsports in 2026 and drives the #100 Carlyle Tools top fuel car.
