= Delay box =

Slang used in drag racing

Delay box is a common slang term used in drag racing to describe an on-board timer which is a transbrake delay timer. A transbrake forces the race car to remain stationary at the starting line, in gear, regardless of how much engine power is applied. When the visual signal is given to start the race, the driver triggers the delay box to begin timing (precisely counting down). If the driver does not interrupt this timing device, the car is launched down the race track at the instant the timer expires (counts to zero). Delay box use was very controversial in the 1980s and 1990s, as it removed a portion of the advantages more experienced racers had. There was a period where technologists added and concealed homemade circuitry inside a delay box that violated some racing associations rules. Racing associations have imposed strict limits on delay boxes today, with manufacturers having to submit to an approval process, which has drastically reduced the number of makers of these devices.

== Mechanism ==
The delay box acts as an on-board timer for the transbrake (from transmission brake). A transbrake is a part of a racing automatic transmission used in drag racing, and are not found in manual transmissions. The electronic timer is packaged in a metal enclosure when sold to drag racers, thus the slang term delay box. This timer box is a very accurate type of monostable multivibrator (electrical engineers also call this type of multivibrator a "one shot"). The timer box acts like a time-delay relay. Many delay boxes actually have an internal relay to switch output current, but some models have solid state transistorized output circuits. The transistorized type made today almost always use power MOSFET type output circuitry. Drag racing delay boxes are designed to operate from the vehicles 12 volt DC electrical system. Some drag race cars now use 16 volt DC systems, in such a scenario the delay box has to be capable of working properly from 16 volts DC, as well as 12 volts DC.

The race car driver holds an electrical pushbutton switch depressed with a finger or a thumb of his right or left hand until he sees a specific desired visual cue. That electrical pushbutton switch is monitored by the delay box. As long as the race car driver holds the pushbutton depressed the delay box sends 12 Volts DC (or 16VDC) at many Amperes to the race car's transmission (where an internal electromagnetic solenoid located in or on the transmission energizes, which in turn positions a spool valve that directs hydraulic fluid pressure in the transmission valvebody that locks the transmission in forward and reverse gears at the same time).

When the transbrake is engaged at the drag race track starting line (driver holding the pushbutton depressed), the car is held stationary regardless of how much engine power is applied to the drive line. The driver typically applies full throttle at this time, and the car remains stationary at the starting line under full engine power. When the driver sees the desired visual cue before him, the driver promptly releases his finger (or thumb) from the pushbutton. This button release opens the contacts within the pushbutton switch signaling the delay box and the delay box now begins an internal countdown. When the countdown timer reaches zero, the delay box stops current flowing to the solenoid in the transmission and that causes the spool valve to return to its normal position. With the spool valve in its normal position hydraulic fluid pressure in the transmission is removed from the reverse clutch pack (but maintained in the forward clutch pack), this causes the drag race car to "launch" (often with great thrust) from the starting line, accelerating rapidly forward toward the finish line.

== History ==
Delay boxes began appearing in drag race cars in the 1980s. The early units were timers in a sheet metal box with an analog potentiometer and lock nut to establish a setpoint with no readout or feedback to the driver. These early units used a resistor / capacitor charging scheme to trigger a unijunction transistor to release an electromechanical relay. Such drag racing delay timers are very crude by today's standards. Nolen (IKE) Hamma is credited with introducing such early devices to drag racing. (currently DBA as Digital Delay, INC.) Ike Hamma is deceased. His family is assigned a patent for a type of delay timer, his son Charlie Hamma is the current president of Digital Delay Inc., a manufacturer of drag racing timers. Other entities contributed to delay box technology and also have Intellectual Property. Some of these other entities have delay box patents (Reid and Furrow), some entities did not pursue patents for their inventions even though their inventions may have predated those of known patent holders.

In the late 1980s units began appearing in the marketplace that were digital in nature rendering the analog, unijunction, R/C timer design obsolete.

The new digital delay box timers used decimal or binary coded decimal thumbwheel switches to set countdown timer values in digital logic. The thumbwheels also fed back a visual numerical value that the race car driver could use to help him calculate proper settings. A popular early digital unit of this type was designed and produced by Robert Furrow (B. F. Electronics of Weatherford, Oklahoma). Robert Furrow's delay box utilized a quartz crystal for timing accuracy and Transistor–transistor logic (TTL) integrated circuits. Furrow's digital delay box was a substantial improvement in accuracy and ergonomics but suffered in reliability. In the United States many B.F. Electronics delay timers were sold Nationwide.

Shortly thereafter the first microprocessor based delay box timer was introduced by Richard Beutnagel (Thorn Microsystems in Rochester, NY). Richard Beutnagel's design also used a quartz crystal time base for accuracy but without the TTL glue logic. The Thorn Microsystems unit utilized a single chip microcomputer from Intel, a professionally fabricated double sided printed circuit board with plated through holes, large BCD thumbwheel switches, and rugged solid state bipolar output circuitry (no electromechanical relay). The Thorn Microsystems design reduced parts count to "one chip" and one power transistor substantially reduced PCB (printed circuit board) solder interconnections for a significant enhancement in reliability. The firmware embedded within the Intel microcontroller chip performed all the timing and control functions required of the delay box with quartz crystal digital accuracy.

Many new TTL and CMOS glue logic designs continued appearing on the market for several more years. Names like Meziere, Terminator, K&R, ATI, Digital Delay (Ike Hamma), Biondo, Davis, D&D (Danny Duberry) and others figure prominently in the history of drag racing delay boxes. Some of the glue logic type designs had large LED (light emitting diode) readouts to display the timer setting, others featured attractive backlighted LCDs (liquid crystal displays), still others used thumbwheels of varying size and quality. All delay boxes on the market were quartz crystal accurate by the year 1990. Several years elapsed before other delay box designs appeared with embedded microprocessors.

Today, virtually all drag race delay boxes are microprocessor based with intelligent, backlit LCD readouts. The most popular models feature internal crossover time computation (allowing a driver to pick a visual cue from his opponents side of the Christmas tree, the delay box internally does simple math computations for the driver), bump up and bump down compensation (allows a driver to easily make small plus or minus timing adjustments quickly and remotely), crossover compensation (an offset time the driver can set when crossing over), safety interlock (prevents delay box from reactivating once the race car is in motion, a valuable feature), bypass (a feature where the delay box is deactivated before it can finish counting down, thus launching the car immediately), and other features.

== Controversial Use ==
Delay box use was very controversial in the 1980s and 1990s, with the peak of controversy occurring around 1993-1994. This continues to this day but the controversy has dropped substantially from its peak. Delay box use became controversial because experienced racers lost some advantage they had enjoyed over the younger, less experienced rivals. Veteran racers who were against the use of delay boxes complained to race track owners and drag racing sanctioning bodies that the delay boxes were unfair. Delay box usage does give a less experienced driver reaction time accuracy improvements that more experienced racers took time and money to learn. These old time racers said that delay box usage constituted cheating. The term "cheater boxes" was heard at the drag races for many years. Track owners around the United States began creating separate races on the same race day at their facility by dividing racers into two groups or classes, a box class and no-box class. "Some" racers began concealing the delay box and entering the no-box class, therefore actually cheating.

Delay box use was initially thought to be limited to transbrake equipped cars. Delay box use by motorcycle drag racers lagged far behind those in use by the car racers. These factors contributed to the delay box controversy because some racers felt their chosen equipment was incompatible with the use of delay boxes. This was untrue and educating the bracket racing community took time.

A significant reason motorcycle drag racers lagged in implementing delay box electronics is due to the wide variety of driveline configurations on dragbikes. Of the successful bracket racing drag race cars, most had automatic transmissions equipped with transbrakes. Innovation quickly adapted the delay box to cars with dual line locks (devices which locked the brakes on all four wheels electrically), and manual transmissions with the use of a hydraulic throw out bearing to hold the clutch plates apart, and also adapted to dragbikes that used pneumatics or hydraulics to actuate the clutch release, or centrifugal dragbike clutches known as "slider clutches" that engage with the engine's revolutions per minute (RPM) increase. When using a delay box on a motorcycle with a slider clutch, the engine RPM is electronically controlled (capped) by an electronic rev limiter connected to a delay box. When the delay box times out, the engine is allowed to freely rev-up engaging the clutch and launching the motorcycle downtrack. As you can see, delay boxes can be used on both cars and motorcycles. A transmission brake is not required to use a delay box for drag racing. When racers were educated to this, and also shown ways to utilize delay boxes on motorcycles, there was some alleviation of the early controversy.

Delay boxes improve starting line reaction time accuracy for drivers. Delay boxes do not do this autonomously. Driver interaction is still required to launch the vehicle and driver skill is still required to achieve a favorable reaction time. A small number of drag racers took to augmenting delay boxes, or paid technologists for circuitry to do so. These racers concealed customized homemade electronic circuits within the delay box enclosure in a stealthy manner which did violate some drag racing rules. The modifications involved circuitry which enhanced the race car's Elapse Time consistency. Vehicle Elapsed Time is a separate, but equally critical, variable to winning a bracket race. The unethical, hidden home brew circuits performed closed loop control of a drag race car's Elapsed Time ( E.T.). This type of electronic vehicle control was prohibited because it violates rules by automatically performing on-board tasks not triggered by the driver. This circuitry became inserted into a commercial delay box enclosure by the end user as a preferred hiding place. Such home brew circuitry created a "flare up" of the controversy related to electronics in drag racing, additionally, and unfairly tarnishing the delay box. Had these unethical, home brew circuits been hidden elsewhere (or had never been created), the delay box most likely would have been spared regulatory action.

== Regulation ==
The tampering became so widespread in the 1990s that the National Hot Rod Association (NHRA) required delay box manufacturers to make the delay boxes harder to modify by end users, and shrink enclosures so there was no room for additional contents. Sealing the delay box enclosure so it would be easy to see if it was tampered with was also part of the process. The NHRA also created rules specifying how a drag racer electrically wired his race car, requiring racers to leave wires unbundled so they could be quickly and easily traced by eye. Rules were also created limiting how many interconnects could attach to the wire between the delay box and the transmission. NHRA track officials were empowered to inspect the wiring to insure it met with the new rules. The NHRA also began requiring delay box manufacturers to pay a fee and submit delay box designs for the NHRA's approval. Then the NHRA instituted rules which allowed only NHRA approved delay boxes at its race tracks. This included revealing trade secrets to the NHRA, while the NHRA refused to enter into Non-Disclosure Agreements with the delay box manufacturers. Once submitted for NHRA approval, and paying the fee, delay box manufactures were not allowed to make any changes in design for any reason without resubmitting to the NHRA for re-approval and paying another fee. To obtain the NHRA's approval, delay box manufacturers had to accommodate the NHRA by making any design changes the NHRA mandated. Essentially the NHRA was now designing delay boxes by proxy. Furthermore, drag racers were prevented from using any delay box they made themselves at home. This is changed the face of drag racing in a huge way. Traditionally, grass roots drag racing was where racers could build their own chassis, engine, transmission, differential, vehicle plumbing & vehicle wiring, etc. Skilled racers could build their own race car with their own hands from parts wherever they acquired them. Racers were not required to buy anything pre-made if they didn't want to. Those days became history almost overnight. Virtually any racer innovation (electronic or mechanical) now came into question and could cause disqualification. An NHRA track could deny the ability to race at their track if they saw something homemade on a race car. The path to racing with the least worry about being disqualified was to buy everything for the car from approved NHRA manufacturers (other sanctioning bodies quickly followed suit, such as the IHRA, NMCA, and others).

Only a few delay box manufacturers were willing to pay NHRA delay box approval fees and submit designs for the NHRA's approval without getting a non-disclosure agreement. Nor did many delay box manufacturers wish to be forced to comply with NHRA design change demands. These manufactures promptly went out of business or transitioned into non-racing related markets. As a result, very few companies manufacture delay boxes for drag racing today and each design is close in functionality to the next. The reduced competition allows these few companies to enjoy the entire market to themselves. Innovation has virtually ceased in the market. The approved manufacturers of delay boxes also enjoy a bonus of reduced competition in the market for their other on-board race timers such as: throttle stop timers, data loggers (data recorders), shifter timers, RPM switches, electronic nitrous oxide injection controllers and other devices. Delay box manufacturers that do not receive NHRA approval are shut out of the entire drag race electronics market.

As mentioned above, in the paragraph one under "Controversial Use", many drag race track operators began dividing race day into "box" and "no box" classes, with "no box class" being prohibited from using any type of delay box in their race cars. However, electronic track timing systems were still used for the "no box class" meaning that a racer willing to cheat could rather easily conceal a delay box somewhere in his car (or on his person), and have an unfair advantage over his competitors. Race track operators therefore created a monumental task for themselves in enforcing rules against electronic devices in Bracket Racings "no box class", and as such, rarely pursue enforcement. On the occasions a track operator does attempt to catch cheaters with delay timers in the "no box" class, the enforcement task can be significantly complex and the results are usually controversial. This creates tension between all racers and between racers and the track operators as well.

The popular United States cable television program "Pinks" (Speed Channel) uses the TV shows host as a flagman with an arm drop technique at the start line (plus finish line human spotters, and camera "photo finishes" similar to those used in horse racing and dog racing). This simulates drag racing's historic roots of post WWII street racing of the 1940s, and non-electronic drag strip racing of the 1950s and 1960s. The delay box is useless in Pinks, since the first pass is run with the Pro tree (.400 three ambers) instead of the Standard Tree (.500 per light), and the second pass and all eliminations are run with an arm drop, which forces the driver to launch at the host's order, and not by a delay box.
