= ZMax Dragway =

Dragstrip in Concord, North Carolina

zMax Dragway

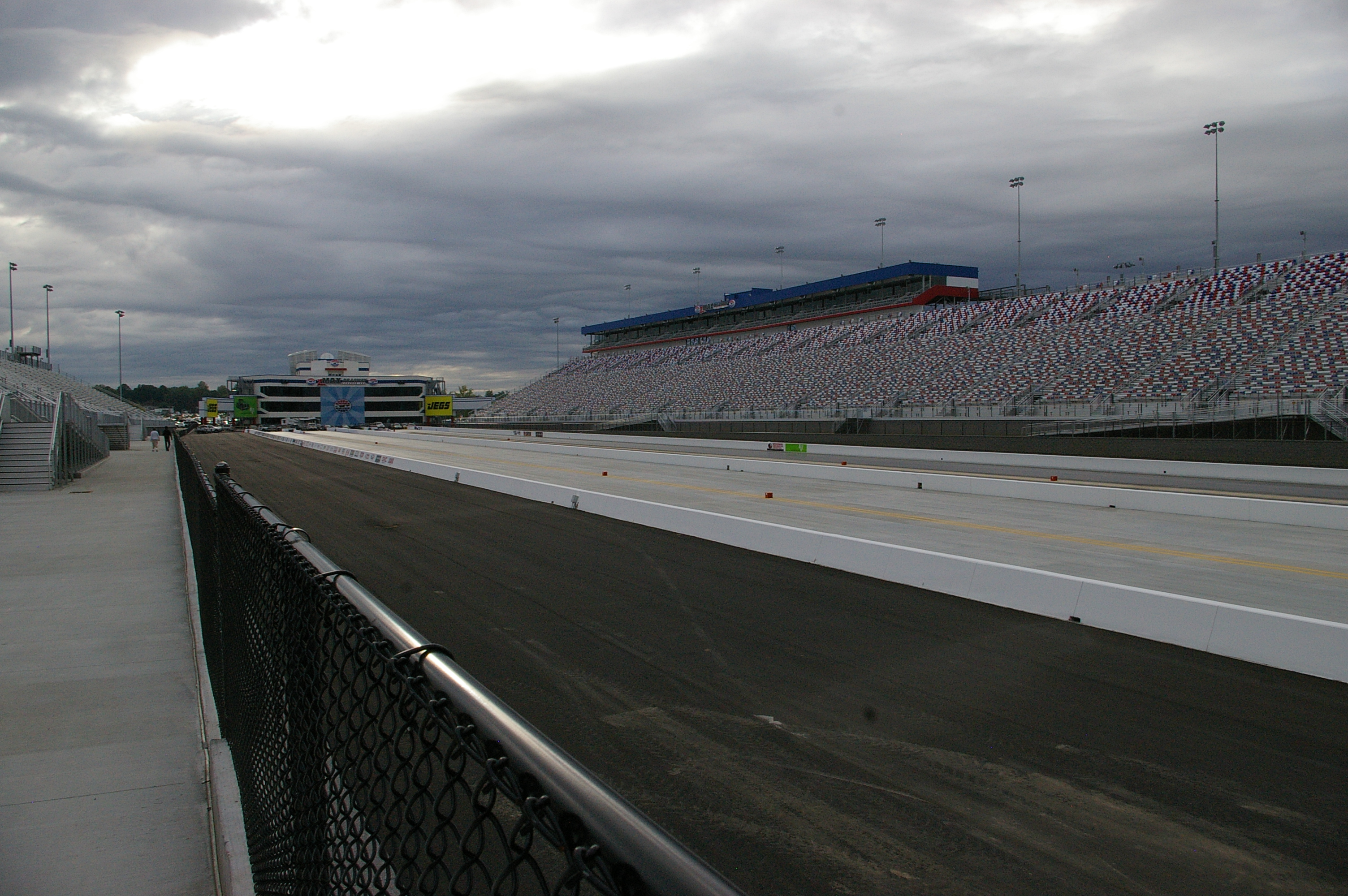
- Location: Concord, North Carolina, United States
- Coordinates: 35°21′41″N 80°41′14″W
- Capacity: 30,000
- Owner: Speedway Motorsports (2008–present)
- Operator: Speedway Motorsports (2008–present)
- Address: 6570 Bruton Smith Blvd
- Broke ground: 5 February 2008; 17 years ago
- Opened: 20 August 2008; 17 years ago
- Construction cost: $60 million
- Major events: Current: NHRA Mission Foods Drag Racing Series; NHRA Carolina Nationals (2008–2013, 2015–2019, 2021–2025); NHRA Four-Wide Nationals (2010–2019, 2021–present); SuperMotocross World Championship (2023–present)

Drag Strip (2008–present)
- Surface: Concrete
- Length: 0.250 mi (0.402 km)

zMAX Dragway is a drag racing facility located in Concord, North Carolina, adjacent to the Charlotte Motor Speedway. Opened in 2008, the facility hosts a variety of racing events.

== History ==
Completed in 2008, zMAX Dragway was developed by Speedway Motorsports and designed by Bruton Smith and his team. It was reportedly the first four-lane, all-concrete drag strip in the world, earning it the nickname "The Bellagio of Drag Strips". The facility also features two pedestrian tunnels beneath the track.

zMAX Dragway is a venue for the National Hot Rod Association (NHRA), hosting several major events annually including the NHRA Four-Wide Nationals. The NHRA Carolina Nationals, typically scheduled for September, is part of the NHRA Countdown to the Championship.

In addition to NHRA events, zMAX Dragway has hosted SuperMotocross World Championship races since 2023.

== Current Track Records ==
Category	E.T.	Speed	Driver	Event	Ref
Top Fuel	3.647		Mike Salinas	2023 betway NHRA Carolina Nationals	
Top Fuel		338.00 mph (543.96 km/h)	Mike Salinas	2023 betway NHRA Carolina Nationals	
Funny Car	3.824		John Force	2024 NHRA Four-Wide Nationals	
Funny Car		338.34 mph (544.51 km/h)	Bob Tasca III	2024 NHRA Four-Wide Nationals	
Pro Stock	6.455		Jason Line	2015 NHRA Four-Wide Nationals	
Pro Stock		215.78 mph (347.26 km/h)	Greg Anderson	2015 NHRA Four-Wide Nationals	
Pro Stock Motorcycle	6.671		Gaige Herrera	2024 NHRA Four-Wide Nationals	
Pro Stock Motorcycle		203.49 mph (327.49 km/h)	Eddie Krawiec	2021 NGK NTK NHRA Four-Wide Nationals	
