= Maryland International Raceway =

Dragstrip near Mechanicsville, Maryland

- Location: Mechanicsville, Maryland, United States
- Coordinates: 38°23′45″N 76°50′44″W
- Capacity: 11,000
- Owner: Royce Miller
- Address: 27861 Budds Creek Road
- Broke ground: 1964
- Opened: 1966
- Former names: St. Mary's Drag-O-Way, Budds Creek Raceway
- Major events: NHRA Mission Foods Drag Racing Series; NHRA Potomac Nationals (2026-)
- Website: www.goracemir.com

Drag Strip
- Length: 0.250 mi (0.402 km)

Maryland International Raceway, formerly Budds Creek Raceway, is a drag racing facility located in Mechanicsville, Maryland. Opened in 1966, it hosts a variety of events, including professional and sportsman drag racing competitions. The track measures 1/4 mile in length and features seating for approximately 11,000 spectators. It has been affiliated with multiple sanctioning bodies over its history, including NASCAR, NHRA, IHRA, and WDRA, and is set to rejoin the NHRA in 2026.

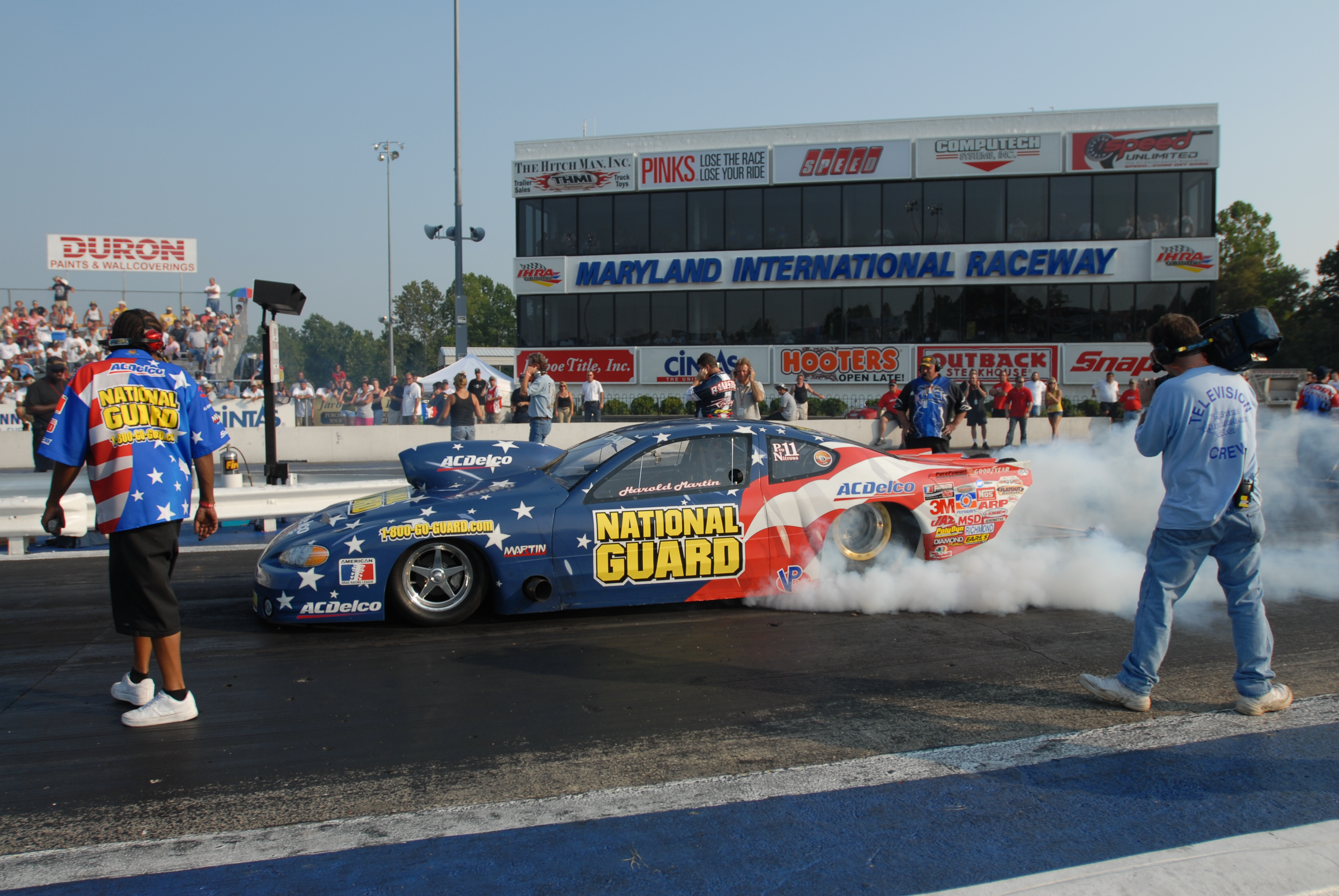
Maryland International Raceway in 2008

== History ==
The origins of Maryland International Raceway trace back to 1964, when local entrepreneur Joe LaRoque and his wife Alberta purchased 150 acres of farmland in St. Mary's County on Labor Day. LaRoque, who operated a trucking and excavation business, was inspired by his experiences in car clubs and a visit to California drag strips to build a dedicated racing facility.

Construction began in late 1964. The track, initially named St. Mary's Drag-O-Way, opened in July 1966 with the NASCAR Top Fuel Championships as its inaugural event, which drew 40 top fuel cars and early funny cars and was won by Ronnie Still in a Hemi Small Block Chevy.

LaRoque owned the facility for just over a year before selling it in 1967 to Bill Cairns, a local car dealership owner, who renamed it Budds Creek Raceway. Cairns ownership lasted until 1972. The track was then acquired by Tod Mack and Larry Clayton, who rechristened it Maryland International Raceway. Mack, a former NASCAR Drag Division employee who had assisted in the original track design, and Clayton implemented creative features, such as dual Christmas trees for four-lane racing and the development of the first digital timing system, DigiTime.

In late 1989, Royce and Linda Miller leased the track, retaining the Maryland International Raceway name. Royce Miller, a former MIR Super Pro Track Champion from 1984, led the facility to switch from NHRA sanctioning to the International Hot Rod Association (IHRA) at the start of the 1992 season. Under their management, MIR hosted notable IHRA events such as the President's Cup, Nitro Jam, Mountain Motor Nationals, and the World Cup Finals, as well as television programs like Pinks.

In 2015, IRG Sports & Entertainment acquired the facility from the Miller family, rebranding it as MDIR and making it their fifth drag racing property. Royce Miller re-acquired the track in late 2021, just before the World Cup Finals, and restored the MIR acronym at the start of the 2022 season.

In 2023, MIR switched its sanctioning body to the World Drag Racing Alliance (WDRA), emphasizing sportsman racing, with Miller joining the WDRA Track Advisory Council.

On August 27, 2025, the National Hot Rod Association (NHRA) announced that Maryland International Raceway would become an NHRA-sanctioned track starting in 2026 as part of the organization's 75th anniversary season. The track is scheduled to host the inaugural NHRA Potomac Nationals, a NHRA Mission Foods Drag Racing Series event, from May 29 to 31, 2026. This marks MIR's return to NHRA events after a hiatus since 1991, with the Potomac Nationals being broadcast on Fox.
