= Bracket racing =

Form of drag racing

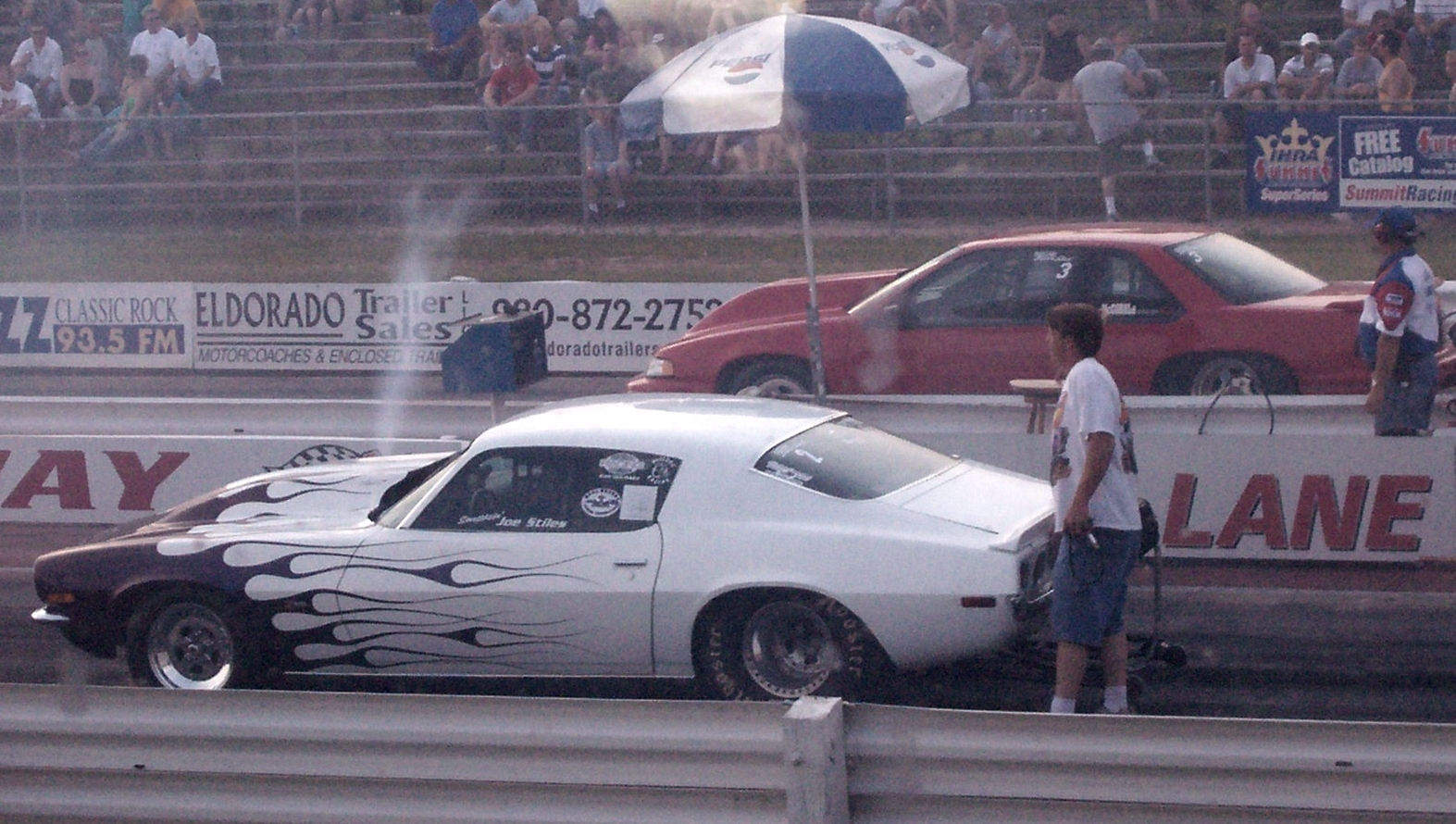

Bracket racing is a form of drag racing that allows for a handicap between predicted elapsed time of the two cars over a standard distance, typically within the three standard distances (1/8 mile, 1,000 foot, or 1/4 mile) of drag racing.

== History ==
Bracket racing began in the late 1960s, mainly in the western United States and Hawaii. It was initially called E.T. bracket racing, E.T. an abbreviation for Elapsed Time. By 1970, races were being held across the United States.

The National Hot Rod Association (NHRA) established a championship schedule for bracket racing in 1977.

In April 2016, TruSTART was introduced by Compulink Timing System Company at the Spring Fling Million race at Las Vegas Motor Speedway, and by July it was being distributed nationwide. The concept of TruSTART was to even out any competitive imbalances at the start of a bracket race.

== Goal ==
The effect of the bracket racing rules is to place a premium on consistency of performance of the driver and car rather than on raw speed, which in turn makes victory much less dependent on large infusions of money and more dependent on mechanical and driving skill. This includes reaction times, shifting abilities, and ability to control the car. Therefore, bracket racing (using the aforementioned handicapping system) is popular with casual weekend racers, some who even drive their vehicles to the track, race them, and then simply drive them home. This format allows for wide varieties of cars to race against each other. While traditional drag racing separates cars into a wide variety of classes based on power and weight, bracket racing classes can be simpler and can accommodate any vehicle with basic technical/safety inspection.

Race events organized in this way are sometimes called "run-what-ya-brung" or "You can't outdollar me, you have got to outdrive me."

== Format ==
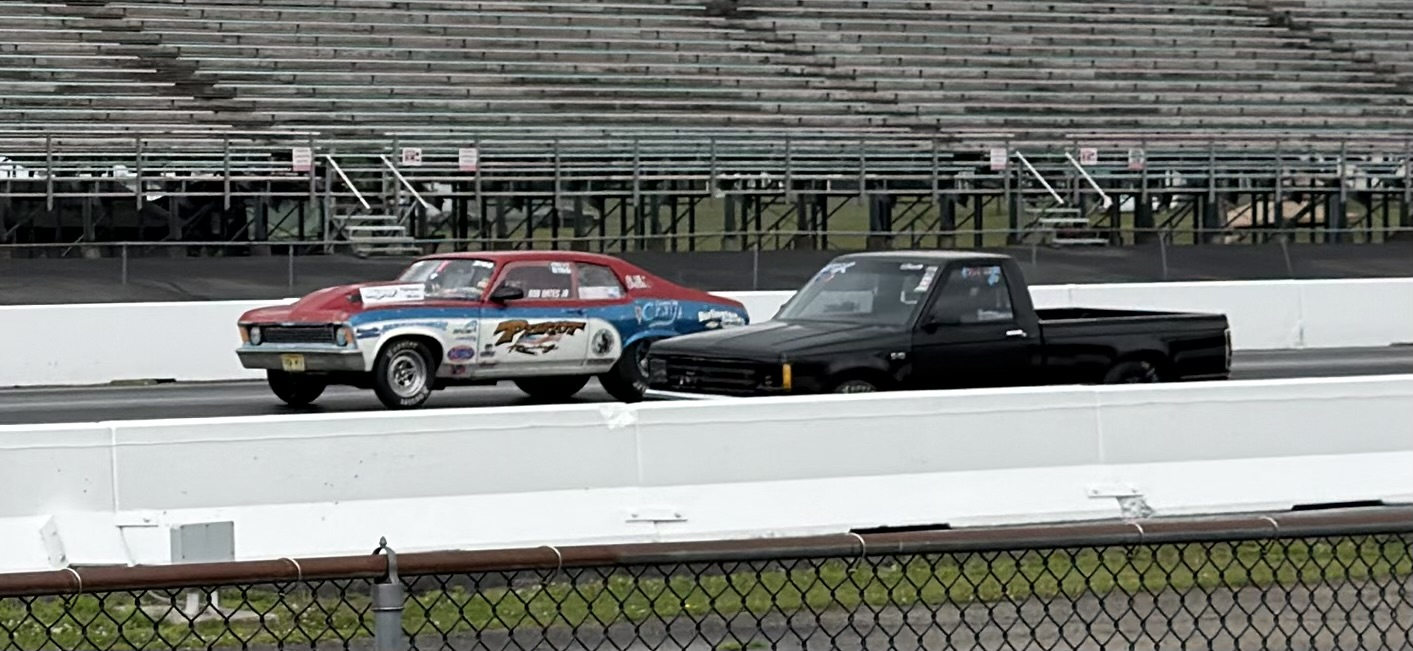

=== Dial-in ===
Each car chooses a dial-in time before the race, predicting the elapsed time the driver estimates it will take their car to cross the finish line. This prediction is based on drivers making practice runs. The slower car in the race is given the green light before the faster car by a margin of the difference between their two dial-in times. This is usually displayed on one or more windows so the starter can adjust the "Christmas tree" starting lights accordingly.

In principle, if both drivers have equal reaction times and their cars run exactly their posted dial-ins, both cars should cross the finish line at precisely the same time. In reality, this is an extremely rare occurrence. Measuring devices both at the start and at the end of the track post times down to 1/100000 of a second (0.00001s precision), which makes tied races almost impossible.

Some forms of bracket racing (NHRA Competition Eliminator, NHRA Stock groups) have cars classified by type, and the dial-in time is based on the type of car that is entered.

=== Reaction time ===
When a car leaves the starting line, a timer is started for that car. The difference between when the green light comes on and when the car actually leaves the starting line is called the reaction time. If a driver leaves before the light turns green, provided the Christmas Tree is already activated (first of three yellow lights is on in that lane), the Christmas Tree system will determine what happens. In a traditional system, if the driver leaving first leaves before the light turns green, that lane is displayed a red light. At events using the TruSTART system (including NHRA national events), the green light is displayed to the offending driver immediately, and then the second car is allowed to start. At that point, if both drivers leave before the light turns green in their lane, the Christmas Tree program for TruSTART determines which car left earlier in relation to the green light, and only that lane is shown a red light. The round is not complete, however, if there is a false start, as the offending driver may still win the round based on their opponent committing a more serious violation.

Sometimes, people incorrectly refer "reaction time" to the unrelated 60 foot takeoff time. The reaction time is merely an indication of how fast a driver reacted compared to when the green light came on. The 60 foot takeoff time is an indicator of how fast the vehicle started moving at the beginning of the race, regardless of the driver’s reaction time. If the driver launched the car with too much power for the available traction, he will have wheelspin and correspondingly will have a longer time to cross the 60 foot barrier if he were to drive with more finesse.

=== Breaking out ===
Breaking out is when a racer manages to cross the finish line in less time than the one they dialed-in beforehand. If only one car "breaks out", it is disqualified and the other one wins by default. In the event that both cars break out, the one closer to their dial-in time wins.

=== Absolute Breakout ===
An absolute breakout that is imposed based on the licensing of the vehicle and/or the driver. Unlike a standard breakout, where a driver can win in a double breakout and red light fouls override breakouts, an absolute breakout is an immediate disqualification and loss of all points earned at that event. Violations involving absolute breakout include:

- A car goes faster than the legal certification limit of the chassis. Examples include:
  - A Top Dragster or Top Sportsman car goes faster than 5.999 seconds (quarter-mile) or 3.659 seconds (eighth-mile). While 6.100 (3.700 in the eighth-mile) seconds is the NHRA breakout rule, the absolute breakout is 6.000 (3.660 in the eighth-mile) seconds.
  - A full bodied car that is certified for 7.50 seconds goes faster than 7.49 seconds.
  - A stock sedan with just a standard three-point harness goes faster than 11.49 seconds (five point harness required at that speed).
  - A vehicle goes 150 mph (240 km/h) or faster in the quarter-mile and does not have a parachute, required for cars that speed or faster.
- A driver goes faster than the legal limit of his competition licence. Examples include:
  - A driver's competition licence only is for cars 7.50 to 9.99 seconds, and his car goes faster than 7.49 seconds.
  - A driver's competition licence only is for cars slower than 10.00 seconds, and his car goes faster than 9.99 seconds.
  - A driver's competition licence in Super Street, Super Stock or Stock is for cars slower than 10.00 seconds with a terminal velocity limit of 135.00 MPH, and the car is faster than 9.99 seconds or goes 135.01 MPH or faster.
- In Junior Dragster, a driver goes faster than the absolute limit imposed by his competition licence or exceeds the intermediate warning twice.
  - Drivers age 5 cannot be faster than 20.00 seconds in the eighth mile during their solo passes.
  - Drivers 6-7 are restricted to 13.90 in the eighth mile, with a warning at 13.70 (or 7.00 in the sixteenth mile), with an absolute limit of 13.50 (or 6.80).
  - Drivers 8-9 are restricted to 11.90 in the eighth mile, with a warning at 11.70 (or 6.10), with an absolute limit of 11.50 (or 5.90).
  - Drivers 10-12 are restricted to 8.90 in the eighth mile, with a warning at 8.70 (or 4.70), with an absolute limit of 8.50 (or 4.50).
  - Drivers over 13 are restricted to 7.90 in the eighth mile, with a warning at 7.70 (or 4.20), with an absolute limit of 7.50 (or 4.10) and 85.00 MPH (chassis).
  - Drivers in Jr Comp are restricted to 6.90 in the eighth mile, with an absolute limit of 6.70 and 110.00 MPH.
  - Drivers who exceed the absolute limit are subject to further NHRA discipline in addition to disqualification and loss of all points from the event meeting.

Examples:

| Race | Dial-in | Race Time | Reaction Time | Outcome | Reason |
|---|---|---|---|---|---|
Race 1
| Driver A | 16.0 | 15.8 | 0.086 | Broke Out | Racer A broke out. |
| Driver B | 15.6 | 15.9 | 0.219 | WINS | Did not red light, nor broke out. |
Race 2
| Driver C | 16.1 | 16.0 | 0.280 | Broke Out (WINS) | Racer C is closer to the dial-in time. (0.1 seconds) |
| Driver D | 15.5 | 15.2 | 0.005 | Broke Out | Racer D broke out with a wider margin (0.3 seconds), so he loses. |
Race 3
| Driver E | 14.9 | 14.9 | -0.020 | Red Light | Red light overrides any break out violations. |
| Driver F | 15.8 | 15.7 | 0.205 | Broke Out (WINS) | Break outs are irrelevant once Driver E triggered the red light violation unless Driver F crosses any boundary line, fails to present his car for inspection after the run, or in some classes, breaks out with a time faster than the absolute limit for that class (such as Junior Dragster, which has age-set limits, or chassis and licence certifications in other classes). Red lights overturn break outs, but boundary line violations overturn red light fouls. Absolute break out violations overturn all. |
Race 4
| Driver G | 15.8 | 15.4 | -0.005 | Broke Out and Red Light (WINS) | Opponent crossing boundary line overturns both a foul start and breakout. |
| Driver H | 14.5 | DQ-CL | 0.200 | Boundary Line | Crossing the boundary line is an automatic disqualification and is worse than a red light or breakout. |
Race 5
| Driver G | 12.5 | 12.50 | -0.005 | Red Light | Both cars committed a red light foul, only this lane is tagged under the 2016 TruSTART programming, as the reaction time was worse. |
| Driver H | 13.2 | 13.21 | -0.002 | WINS | Though the vehicle left first and would be tagged with a red light, under 2016 TruSTART programming, the green light is shown to the driver at first. As the opponent's -.005 for the later start is worse than a -.002 reaction time, the red light is subsequently shown to that lane only. |

This eliminates any advantage from bending the rules by putting a slow dial-in time on the windshield to get a head start. However, some racers will purposely dial a slower time and then let off of the throttle or use their brakes near the end of the track in an attempt to use strategy to win the race rather than relying on the car to run the dial in.

=== Bracket Racing Strategy ===
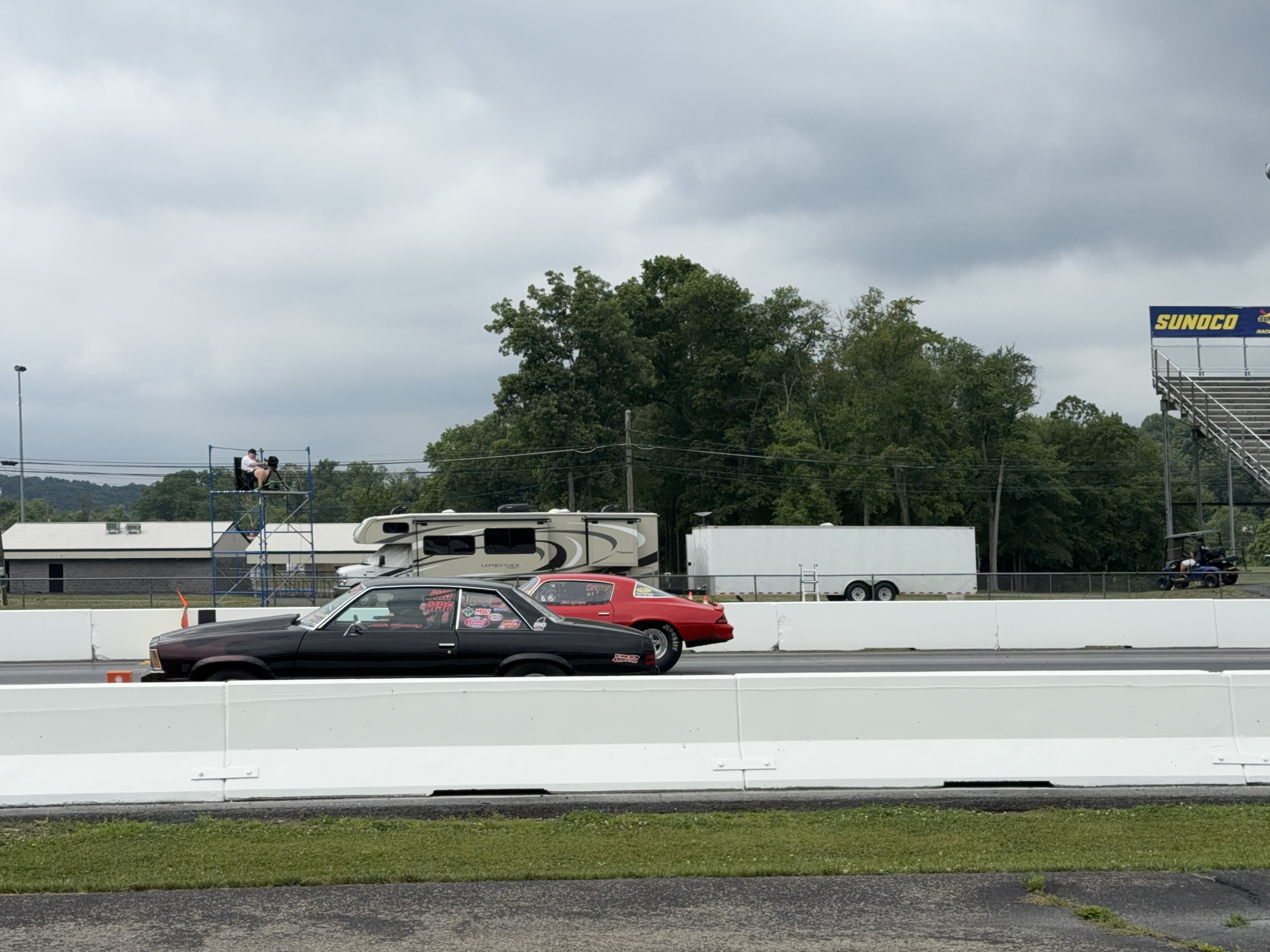

Bracket racing boils down mainly into one thing; putting up the best "package". The best package is technically the winner in every drag race. A "package" is : package = drivers reaction time + deviation from the dial-in.

For example:

Driver A has a reaction time of 0.025 and his car runs 9.653 on a 9.64 dial in. His package = 0.025 + (9.653-9.64) = 0.038

Driver B has a reaction time of 0.005 and his car runs 10.684 on a 10.66 dial in. His package = 0.005 + (10.684-10.66) = 0.029

In this scenario driver B wins despite his car running further off the number. But we can deduce even more than just that he won; we can see that he won by a (0.038 - 0.029) = 0.009 finish margin which is about 22 inches at about 140 mph.

The formula used to calculate the margin of victory is :

17.6 * finish margin * behind vehicle mph = finish margin in inches

Professional (and some amateur) bracket racing has evolved over the years into a drivers' sport. It used to consist of trying to get a good reaction time then hoping the car ran near the number. Drivers would avoid breaking out like the plague, dialing their cars 0.01 faster than it had ever gone before.

A key element of the competition is the driver's ability to match this predicted time as closely as possible without going faster, a practice referred to as 'running the number'. Competitors use various staging and driving techniques to achieve consistency and counter their opponent's performance.

=== Red Light and other fouls ===
If a car leaves the starting line before the green light comes on, a foul is recorded (a red-light start), and that car is provisionally disqualified. Traditionally, only the first car to foul start is shown the red light; an automatic green light is shown in the other lane at the appropriate time. Since 2016, many tracks (and the NHRA) now use TruSTART, which is new code written to the Christmas Tree. When the first car launches, a green light will be initially shown, even if the driver committed a foul start. Once the second driver leaves, if one driver has a negative reaction time (foul start), that driver's lane will be shown a red light. If both lanes show a negative reaction time, only the lane with the worse negative reaction time will be shown a red light (left lane -.021 and right lane -.020, red light on the left lane only). Another form of foul is to cross the dividing line between the two lanes, or the line at the edge of the racing surface, both of which negates a red light foul. A foul is worse than a break out; one car can break out but if the other car fouls, the car that breaks out advances to the next round unless it is an absolute breakout (in certain classes only). If both cars foul, the lesser of the violations is the winner; a break-out is the least serious violation, then a red light, crossing the boundary line at the edge of the surface, crossing the dividing line between the lanes, leaving before the tree is started, failure of technical inspection after the run, and then absolute breakout.

Both cars are disqualified in double fouls if both competitors cross either boundary line (edge of surface or dividing lane between lanes), but if one car has crossed the boundary line and the other car must cross the line to avoid the car that first crossed, the car that crossed the line to avoid a collision is automatically declared the winner and advances. Only one car is disqualified if both competitors commit different fouls of the other type. Both drivers are disqualified if they leave before the tree is started, but if video evidence can show which of the two drivers left first, only the first driver is disqualified. If one car leaves before the tree is started, the other driver is automatically the winner provided there is no absolute breakout or inspection violation, regardless of a further red light or crossing either boundary line (which by rule becomes a single run with a "no time, took green light" win status). In a final, in case of a double disqualification on boundary lines or leaving before the tree is started, only the first driver to foul (cross the boundary line, leave before tree started) will be tagged. The only way a double disqualification can occur in the finals is if both cars fail technical inspection or commit an absolute breakout violation. A driver who commits an absolute breakout is disqualified and subject to loss of points from the entire event. If there is an odd number of cars remaining in the next round, one driver earns competition bye in the subsequent round if an odd number of cars remain. No driver may receive more than one competition bye during an event.

In any single run, once a car is staged (bye run or opponent unable to stage), it automatically wins and does not need to cross the finish line. The driver will not be shown a red light for a foul start, as the red light is automatically placed in the other lane. However, if the car crosses a boundary line, the run will be disqualified. In such cases, the car will be scored as if it did not finish ("no time, took green light"), but advances to the next round. However, a disqualification for an absolute breakout or technical inspection failure will still be assessed if either infraction occurs. In a fully bracketed competition, the opponent in the next round will then be awarded a competition bye run based on an opponent unable to stage for being disqualified, but if there is an even number of cars, the pairings may be realigned to ensure there is no bye run in that round.

Most tracks enforce a rule that prohibits a driver from having more than one bracket-based bye run, when the number of cars remaining in a race is less than a power of two. A competition bye run, caused by an opponent unable to stage because of mechanical failure or disqualification of the scheduled opponent from the previous round, do not count towards the one bye run limit. If all cars remaining have had a previous bye run on bracket, the number for all competitors is reset to zero for purposes of the rule.
