= 1995 NHRA Winston Drag Racing Series season =

1995 NHRA Drag Racing Season
- League: NHRA
- Sport: Drag racing
- Champions: Scott Kalitta (Top Fuel); John Force (Funny Car); Warren Johnson (Pro Stock); John Myers (Pro Stock Bike)

NHRA seasons
- ← 1994 1996 →

The NHRA Winston Drag Racing Series which was the series of drag racing races that took place from 1975 and 2001. The series is currently now known as the NHRA Mission Foods Drag Racing Series. It also is the top competition division that is in the NHRA.

These are the official results for the 1995 Season.

== Schedule ==
1995 NHRA Winston Drag Racing Series Schedule
Date	Race	Site	Winners			
Date	Race	Site	Top Fuel	Funny Car	Pro Stock	Pro Stock Bike
February 2-5	Chief Auto Parts Winternationals	Pomona, California	Eddie Hill	Cruz Pedregon	Darrell Alderman	N/A
February 16–19	ATSCO Nationals	Phoenix, Arizona	Larry Dixon	John Force	Darrell Alderman	N/A
March 9–12	Slick 50 Nationals Presented By Western Auto	Houston, Texas	Mike Dunn	Al Hofmann	Scott Geoffrion	Michael Phillips
March 16-19 (Finished Following Weekend)	Mac Tools Gatornationals	Gainesville, Florida	Larry Dixon	John Force	Darrell Alderman	John Myers
April 7-9	Winston Select Invitational Non Points Event	Rockingham, North Carolina	Scott Kalitta	John Force	Darrell Alderman	N/A
April 20–23 (Finished On Monday)	Fram NHRA Nationals	Atlanta, Georgia	Cory McClenathan	John Force	Mark Osborne	David Schultz
May 4–7	Mid-South Nationals	Memphis, Tennessee	Cory McClenathan	Gary Clapshaw	Mark Pawuk	N/A
May 18–21	Mopar Parts Nationals	Englishtown, New Jersey	Larry Dixon	Cruz Pedregon	Bob Gildden	David Schultz
June 1-4	Virginia Is For Lovers Nationals	Richmond, Virginia	Cory McClenathan	John Force	Warren Johnson	David Schultz
June 8-11	Oldsmobile Springnationals	Columbus, Ohio	Scott Kalitta	Al Hofmann	Steve Schmidt	John Myers
June 29-July 2	Western Auto Parts Nationals Presented By Slick 50	Topeka, Kansas	Scott Kalitta	Cruz Pedregon	Warren Johnson	N/A
July 20–23	Mopar Parts Mile-High NHRA Nationals	Denver, Colorado	Scott Kalitta	John Force	Kurt Johnson	John Myers
July 28–30	NHRA Autolite Nationals	Sonoma, California	Mike Dunn	Al Hofmann	Jim Yates	N/A
August 4–6 (Finished On Tuesday)	NHRA Northwest Nationals	Seattle, Washington	Ron Capps	Al Hofmann	Warren Johnson	N/A
August 17–20	NHRA Champion Auto Stores Nationals	Brainerd, Minnesota	Mike Dunn	John Force	Warren Johnson	John Myers
August 30-September 4	U.S. Nationals	Indianapolis, Indiana	Larry Dixon	Cruz Pedregon	Warren Johnson	Rick Ward
September 14–17	NHRA Pioneer Keystone Nationals	Reading, Pennsylvania	Scott Kalitta	Chuck Etchells	Warren Johnson	John Myers
September 28–October 1	Sears Craftsman Nationals	Topeka, Kansas	Scott Kalitta	Cruz Pedregon	Steve Schmidt	John Myers
October 12–15	Chief Auto Parts Nationals	Dallas, Texas	Scott Kalitta	Chuck Etchells	Kurt Johnson	N/A
October 26-29	NHRA Winston Select Finals	Pomona, California	Blaine Johnson	Al Hofmann	Warren Johnson	John Myers
