= 2013 NHRA Mello Yello Drag Racing Series =

2013 NHRA Mello Yello Drag Racing Series season
- League: NHRA
- Sport: Drag racing
- Champions: Shawn Langdon (TF); John Force (FC); Jeg Coughlin (PS); Matt Smith (PSM)

NHRA seasons
- ← 2012 2014 →

The 2013 NHRA Mello Yello Drag Racing Series was announced by the NHRA on August 12, 2012.

There were 24 Top Fuel, Funny Car, and Pro Stock car events, and 16 Pro Stock Motorcycle events scheduled.

== Schedule ==
2013 NHRA Mello Yello Schedule
Date	Race	Site	Winners			
Date	Race	Site	Top Fuel	Funny Car	Pro Stock	PS Motorcycle
February 14–17	O'Reilly Auto Parts NHRA Winternationals	Pomona, Calif.	Shawn Langdon (1)	Courtney Force (1)	Vincent Nobile (1)	N/A
February 22–24	NHRA Arizona Nationals	Phoenix, AZ	Tony Schumacher (1)	Ron Capps (1)	Erica Enders-Stevens (1)	N/A
March 14–17	Amalie Motor Oil Gatornationals	Gainesville, Fla	Antron Brown (1)	Johnny Gray (1)	Allen Johnson (1)	Hector Arana, Jr. (1)
April 5–7	SummitRacing.com NHRA Nationals	Las Vegas, Nev.	Tony Schumacher (2)	Cruz Pedregon (1)	Allen Johnson (2)	N/A
April 19–21	Dollar General Four-Wide Nationals^{1}	Concord, N.C.	Spencer Massey (1)	Matt Hagan (1)	Mike Edwards (1)	Hector Arana, Jr. (2)
April 26–28	O'Reilly Auto Parts NHRA Spring Nationals	Houston, Texas	Bob Vandergriff (1)	Cruz Pedregon (2)	Jason Line (1)	Hector Arana, Jr. (3)
May 10–11 (Note: Originally scheduled May 3–5, the NHRA postponed the Summit Racing Equipment NHRA Southern Nationals due to heavy rains.)	Summit Racing Equipment NHRA Southern Nationals	Atlanta, Ga.	Antron Brown (2)	Johnny Gray (2)	Mike Edwards (2)	N/A
May 17–19	NHRA Kansas Nationals	Topeka, Kan.	Shawn Langdon (2)	Johnny Gray (3)	Jeg Coughlin, Jr. (1)	N/A
May 30 – June 2	Toyota NHRA Summernationals	Englishtown, N.J.	Shawn Langdon (3)	Matt Hagan (2)	Mike Edwards (3)	Michael Ray (1)
June 14–16	NHRA Ford Thunder Valley Nationals	Bristol, Tenn.	Steve Torrence (1)	John Force (1)	Rodger Brogdon (1)	N/A
June 20–23	Auto Plus NHRA New England Nationals	Epping, N.H.	Spencer Massey (1)	Courtney Force (2)	Allen Johnson (3)	John Hall (1)
June 27–30	O'Reilly Auto Parts Route 66 NHRA Nationals	Chicago, Ill.	Tony Schumacher (3)	Matt Hagan (3)	Jeg Coughlin, Jr. (2)	Michael Ray (2)
July 4–7	Summit Racing Equipment NHRA Nationals	Norwalk, Ohio	Khalid alBalooshi (1)	Johnny Gray (4)	Mike Edwards (4)	Matt Smith (1)
July 19–21	Mopar Mile-High NHRA Nationals	Denver, Colo.	Spencer Massey (2)	Cruz Pedregon (3)	Allen Johnson (4)	Shawn Gann (1)
July 26–28	NHRA Sonoma Nationals	Sonoma, Calif.	Shawn Langdon (4)	Ron Capps (2)	Vincent Nobile (2)	Hector Arana, Jr. (4)
August 2–4	O'Reilly Auto Parts NHRA Northwest Nationals	Seattle, Wash.	Morgan Lucas (1)	Matt Hagan (4)	Vincent Nobile (3)	N/A
August 15–18	Lucas Oil NHRA Nationals	Brainerd, Minn.	Spencer Massey (3)	Ron Capps (3)	Mike Edwards (5)	N/A
August 28 – September 2	Chevrolet Performance NHRA U.S. Nationals	Indianapolis, Ind.	Shawn Langdon (5)	Robert Hight (1)	Mike Edwards (6)	John Hall (2)
2013 Countdown to One
September 13–15	NHRA Nationals	Concord, N.C.	Morgan Lucas (2)	Robert Hight (2)	Jeg Coughlin, Jr. (3)	Andrew Hines (1)
September 19–22	AAA Texas NHRA Fall Nationals	Dallas, Texas	Doug Kalitta (1)	Cruz Pedregon (4)	Jason Line (2)	Eddie Krawiec (1)
September 27–29	AAA Insurance NHRA Midwest Nationals	St. Louis, MO	Antron Brown (4)	John Force (2)	Erica Enders-Stevens (2)	Matt Smith (2)
October 3–6	Auto-Plus NHRA Nationals	Reading, Pa.	Shawn Langdon (6)	John Force (3)	Jeg Coughlin, Jr. (4)	Matt Smith (3)
October 24–27	NHRA Las Vegas Nationals	Las Vegas, Nev.	Antron Brown (5)	John Force (4)	Shane Gray (1)	Matt Smith (4)
November 7–10	Automobile Club of Southern California NHRA Finals	Pomona, Calif.	Shawn Langdon (7)	Matt Hagan (5)	Rickie Jones (1)	Eddie Krawiec (2)

- NOTE: All races will be televised on ESPN or ESPN2.

^{1} The rules for the 4 Wide Nationals differ from other races:

- All cars will qualify on each lane as all four lanes will be used in qualifying.
- Three rounds with cars using all four lanes.
- In Rounds One and Two, the top two drivers (of four) will advance to the next round.
- The pairings are set as follows:
  - Race One: 1, 8, 9, 16
  - Race Two: 4, 5, 12, 13
  - Race Three: 2, 7, 10, 15
  - Race Four: 3, 6, 11, 14
  - Semifinal One: Top two in Race One and Race Two
  - Semifinal Two: Top two in Race Three and Race Four
  - Finals: Top two in Semifinal One and Semifinal Two
- Lane choice determined by times in previous round. In first round, lane choice determined by fastest times.
- Drivers who advance in Rounds One and Two will receive 20 points for each round advancement.
- In Round Three, the winner of the race will be declared the race winner and will collect 40 points. The runner-up will receive 20 points. Third and fourth place drivers will be credited as semifinal losers.

== New drivers ==
Brittney Force, daughter of John Force, made her NHRA debut driving in Top Fuel for John Force Racing.

== Notable events ==
New England Dragway has been added to the NHRA schedule with the New England Nationals, and featuring all four Professional race categories. Morgan Lucas announces he will exit the cockpit of his dragster after the season's end, to attend to future family business.

== Points standings ==
Top Fuel
Position	Driver	Points	Points Back	Chassis
1	Shawn Langdon	2653	–	Hadman
2	Antron Brown	2489	−164	DSR
3	Doug Kalitta	2488	−165	Hadman
4	Morgan Lucas	2422	−231	
5	Spencer Massey	2422	−231	DSR
6	Clay Millican	2404	−249	Hadman
7	Tony Schumacher	2394	−259	DSR
8	Khalid Albalooshi	2286	−367	Hadman
9	Bob Vandergriff Jr.	2251	−402	Hadman
10	Steve Torrence	2217	−436	Hadman

Funny Car
Position	Driver	Points	Points Back	Make
1	John Force	2688	–	Ford
2	Matt Hagan	2548	−140	Dodge
3	Jack Beckman	2445	−243	Dodge
4	Cruz Pedregon	2415	−273	Toyota
5	Robert Hight	2413	−275	Ford
6	Ron Capps	2406	−282	Dodge
7	Courtney Force	2403	−285	Ford
8	Del Worsham	2309	−379	Toyota
9	Johnny Gray	2309	−379	Dodge
10	Tim Wilkerson	2238	−450	Ford

Pro Stock
Position	Driver	Points	Points Back	Make
1	Jeg Coughlin Jr.	2572	–	Dodge
2	Allen Johnson	2514	−58	Dodge
3	Jason Line	2502	−70	Chevrolet
4	Mike Edwards	2482	−90	Chevrolet
5	Shane Gray	2480	−92	Chevrolet
6	Erica Enders-Stevens	2406	−166	Chevrolet
7	V. Gaines	2355	−217	Dodge
8	Greg Anderson	2345	−227	Chevrolet
9	Vincent Nobile	2298	−274	Dodge
10	Rodger Brogdon	2147	−425	Chevrolet

Pro Stock Motorcycle
Position	Driver	Points	Points Back	Make
1	Matt Smith	2633	–	Buell
2	Michael Ray Jr	2510	−123	Buell
3	Eddie Krawiec	2492	−141	Harley-Davidson
4	Hector Arana Jr.	2464	−169	Buell
5	Hector Arana	2456	−177	Buell
6	Scott Pollacheck	2385	−248	Buell
7	LE Tonglet	2383	−250	Suzuki
8	John Hall	2351	−282	Buell
9	Shawn Gann	2247	−386	Buell
10	Adam Arana	2244	−389	Buell
