= 1996 NHRA Winston Drag Racing Series season =

1996 NHRA Drag Racing Season
- League: NHRA
- Sport: Drag racing
- Champions: Kenny Bernstein (Top Fuel); John Force (Funny Car); Jim Yates (Pro Stock); David Schultz (Pro Stock Bike)

NHRA seasons
- ← 1995 1997 →

The NHRA Winston Drag Racing Series was the series of drag racing races which took place from 1975 and 2001. The series is currently now known as the NHRA Mission Foods Drag Racing Series. It is also the top competition division that is in the NHRA.

These are official the results for the 1996 Season.

== Schedule ==
1996 NHRA Winston Drag Racing Series Schedule
| Date | Race | Site | Winners | | | |
| Date | Race | Site | Top Fuel | Funny Car | Pro Stock | Pro Stock Bike |
|---|---|---|---|---|---|---|
| February 1-4 | Chief Auto Parts Winternationals | Pomona, California | Blaine Johnson | Al Hofmann | Jim Yates | N/A |
| February 22–25 | ATSCO Nationals | Phoenix, Arizona | Kenny Bernstein | John Force | Jim Yates | N/A |
| March 14-17 | Mac Tools Gatornationals | Gainesville, Florida | Blaine Johnson | John Force | Jim Yates | John Myers |
| March 28–31 | Slick 50 Nationals Presented By Western Auto | Houston, Texas | Kenny Bernstein | John Force | Mike Edwards | John Myers |
| April 12–14 | Winston Select Invitational Non Points Event | Rockingham, North Carolina | Blaine Johnson | John Force | Warren Johnson | N/A |
| April 18–21 | Fram NHRA Nationals | Atlanta, Georgia | Larry Dixon | Tony Pedregon | Kurt Johnson | David Schultz |
| May 2-5 | Pennzoil Nationals | Richmond, Virginia | Shelly Anderson | John Force | Warren Johnson | John Myers |
| May 16–19 | Mopar Parts Nationals | Englishtown, New Jersey | Joe Amato | John Force | Jim Yates | David Schultz |
| June 6–9 Finished June 15 | Pontiac Excitement Nationals Presented By Summit Racing | Columbus, Ohio | Cory McClenathan | Chuck Etchells | Chuck Harris | David Schultz |
| June 20–23 | Pennzoil Nationals | Memphis, Tennessee | Mike Dunn | John Force | Warren Johnson | N/A |
| July 4-7 | Western Auto Parts America Nationals Presented By Slick 50 | Topeka, Kansas | Scott Kalitta | John Force | Warren Johnson | N/A |
| July 18–21 | Mopar Parts Mile-High NHRA Nationals | Denver, Colorado | Eddie Hill | John Force | Jim Yates | Matt Hines |
| July 26–28 | NHRA Autolite Nationals | Sonoma, California | Blaine Johnson | Cruz Pedregon | Warren Johnson | N/A |
| August 2–4 | NHRA Northwest Nationals | Seattle, Washington | Shelly Anderson | John Force | Mike Edwards | N/A |
| August 15–18 | NHRA Champion Auto Stores Nationals | Brainerd, Minnesota | Kenny Bernstein | John Force | Warren Johnson | Matt Hines |
| August 28-September 2 | U.S. Nationals | Indianapolis, Indiana | Cory McClenathan | John Force | Kurt Johnson | John Myers |
| September 12–15 | NHRA Pioneer Keystone Nationals | Reading, Pennsylvania | Kenny Bernstein | Jeff Arend | Jim Yates | Angelle Seeling |
| September 26–29 | Sears Craftsman Nationals | Topeka, Kansas | Jim Head | John Force | Jim Yates | John Myers |
| October 10–13 | Chief Auto Parts Nationals | Dallas, Texas | Cory McClenathan | Dale Pulde | Jim Yates | N/A |
| October 24-27 | NHRA Winston Finals | Pomona, California | Joe Amato | John Force | Mike Edwards | John Smith |
