= 2012 NHRA Full Throttle Drag Racing Series season =

- League: NHRA
- Sport: Drag racing
- Champions: Antron Brown (Top Fuel); Jack Beckman (Funny Car); Allen Johnson (Pro Stock); Eddie Krawiec (Pro Stock Motorcycle)

NHRA seasons
- ← 2011 2013 →

The 2012 NHRA Full Throttle Drag Racing Season was announced on September 8, 2011. The schedule was revised on October 12, 2011, with the events at Maple Grove Raceway and Gateway International Raceway swapping dates.

There were 23 Top Fuel, Funny Car, and Pro Stock car events, and 16 Pro Stock Motorcycle events scheduled.

== Schedule ==
2012 NHRA Full Throttle Schedule
| Date | Race | Site | Winners | | | |
| Date | Race | Site | Top Fuel | Funny Car | Pro Stock | PS Motorcycle |
|---|---|---|---|---|---|---|
| February 9–12 | O'Reilly Auto Parts NHRA Winternationals | Pomona, Calif. | Spencer Massey (1) | John Force (1) | Greg Anderson (1) | N/A |
| February 17–19 | NHRA Arizona Nationals | Phoenix, AZ | Antron Brown (1) | Robert Hight (1) | Jason Line (1) | N/A |
| March 8–11 | Tire Kingdom Gatornationals | Gainesville, Fla | Morgan Lucas (1) | Robert Hight (2) | Mike Edwards (1) | Eddie Krawiec (1) |
| March 30–April 1 | SummitRacing.com NHRA Nationals | Las Vegas, Nev. | Spencer Massey (2) | Robert Hight (3) | Allen Johnson (1) | N/A |
| April 13–15 | NHRA Four-Wide Nationals^{1} | Concord, N.C. | Spencer Massey (3) | Robert Hight (4) | Greg Anderson (2) | N/A |
| April 27–29 | O'Reilly Auto Parts NHRA Spring Nationals | Houston, Texas | Morgan Lucas (2) | Mike Neff (1) | Vincent Nobile (1) | Andrew Hines (1) |
| May 4–6 | Summit Racing Equipment NHRA Southern Nationals | Atlanta, Ga. | Steve Torrence (1) | Ron Capps (1) | Greg Anderson (3) | Eddie Krawiec (2) |
| May 18–20 | Dollar General NHRA Summer Nationals | Topeka, Kan. | David Grubnic (1) | Jack Beckman (1) | Allen Johnson (2) | N/A |
| May 31–June 3 | Toyota NHRA SuperNationals | Englishtown, N.J. | Steve Torrence (2) | Johnny Gray (1) | Greg Anderson (4) | Eddie Krawiec (3) |
| June 15–17 | Ford NHRA Thunder Valley Nationals | Bristol, Tenn. | Tony Schumacher (1) | Ron Capps (2) | Mike Edwards (2) | N/A |
| June 28–July 1 | O'Reilly Auto Parts Route 66 NHRA Nationals | Chicago, Ill. | Antron Brown (2) | Jeff Arend (1) | Erica Enders (1) | Andrew Hines (2) |
| July 5–8 | Summit Racing Equipment NHRA Nationals | Norwalk, Ohio | Spencer Massey (4) | Mike Neff (2) | Vincent Nobile (2) | Andrew Hines (3) |
| July 20–22 | Mopar Mile-High NHRA Nationals | Denver, Colo. | Antron Brown (3) | Jack Beckman (2) | Allen Johnson (3) | Eddie Krawiec (4) |
| July 27–29 | NHRA Sonoma Nationals | Sonoma, Calif. | Antron Brown (4) | Johnny Gray (2) | Allen Johnson (4) | Eddie Krawiec (5) |
| August 3–5 | O'Reilly Auto Parts NHRA Northwest Nationals | Seattle, Wash. | Steve Torrence (3) | Courtney Force (1) | Erica Enders (2) | N/A |
| August 16–19 | Lucas Oil NHRA Nationals | Brainerd, Minn. | Morgan Lucas (3) | Ron Capps (3) | Erica Enders (3) | Eddie Krawiec (6) |
| August 29 – September 3 | Mac Tools U.S. Nationals | Indianapolis, Ind. | Tony Schumacher (2) | Mike Neff (3) | Dave Connolly (1) | Andrew Hines (4) |
2012 Countdown to One
| September 14–16 | O'Reilly Auto Parts NHRA Nationals | Concord, N.C. | Shawn Langdon (1) | Ron Capps (4) | Jason Line (2) | Andrew Hines (5) |
| September 20–23 | AAA Texas NHRA Fall Nationals | Dallas, Texas | Antron Brown (5) | Bob Tasca III (1) | Allen Johnson (5) | Michael Ray (1) |
| September 28–30 | AAA Insurance NHRA Midwest Nationals | Madison, IL | Antron Brown (6) | Jack Beckman (3) | Erica Enders (4) | Eddie Krawiec (7) |
| October 4–8 (Note: Finals postponed to Monday. Pro Stock Motorcycle final round was postponed due to rain. The two finalists raced for the title during one of the qualifying session at The Strip at Las Vegas Motor Speedway's Big O Tires Nationals on October 27.) | Auto-Plus NHRA Nationals | Reading, Pa. | Khalid alBalooshi (1) | Mike Neff (4) | V. Gaines (1) | Eddie Krawiec (8) |
| October 25–28 | Big O Tires NHRA Nationals | Las Vegas, Nev. | Bob Vandergriff (1) | Ron Capps (5) | Allen Johnson (6) | Eddie Krawiec (9) |
| November 8–11 | Automobile Club of Southern California NHRA Finals | Pomona, Calif. | Brandon Bernstein (1) | Cruz Pedregon (1) | Allen Johnson (7) | Andrew Hines (6) |

- NOTE: All races will be televised on ESPN or ESPN2.

^{1} The rules for the VisitMyrtleBeach.com 4 Wide Nationals differ from other races:

- All cars will qualify on each lane as all four lanes will be used in qualifying.
- Three rounds with cars using all four lanes.
- In Rounds One and Two, the top two drivers (of four) will advance to the next round.
- The pairings are set as follows:
  - Race One: 1, 8, 9, 16
  - Race Two: 4, 5, 12, 13
  - Race Three: 2, 7, 10, 15
  - Race Four: 3, 6, 11, 14
  - Semifinal One: Top two in Race One and Race Two
  - Semifinal Two: Top two in Race Three and Race Four
  - Finals: Top two in Semifinal One and Semifinal Two
- Lane choice determined by times in previous round. In first round, lane choice determined by fastest times.
- Drivers who advance in Rounds One and Two will receive 20 points for each round advancement.
- In Round Three, the winner of the race will be declared the race winner and will collect 40 points. The runner-up will receive 20 points. Third and fourth place drivers will be credited as semifinal losers.

== Notable events ==
Gateway Motorsports Park has reopened with former IndyCar Firestone Indy Lights driver Curtis Francois as the track owner, rejoining the NHRA schedule with the Midwest Nationals and featuring all four Professional race categories.

Top Fuel driver Hillary Will announced a return to the Full Throttle racing series, beginning at the Gatornationals on March 8. She will pilot the Dote Racing top-fuel dragster.

Pro Stock driver Jeg Coughlin announced he will return to Pro Stock category in 2012 with Fiat's Mopar brand of auto parts along with JEGS in a 2012 Dodge Avenger.

The 2012 Chevrolet Camaro Pro Stock will be legal as of the 2012 Tire Kingdom Gatornationals.

== Points standings ==
Top Fuel
| Position | Driver | Points | Points Back |
|---|---|---|---|
| 1 | Antron Brown | 2555 | – |
| 2 | Tony Schumacher | 2548 | −7 |
| 3 | Spencer Massey | 2505 | −50 |
| 4 | Shawn Langdon | 2450 | −105 |
| 5 | Brandon Bernstein | 2450 | −105 |
| 6 | Doug Kalitta | 2341 | −214 |
| 7 | Morgan Lucas | 2338 | −217 |
| 8 | Bob Vandergriff | 2336 | −219 |
| 9 | Steve Torrence | 2300 | −255 |
| 10 | David Grubnic | 2260 | −295 |

Funny Car
| Position | Driver | Points | Points Back |
|---|---|---|---|
| 1 | Jack Beckman | 2610 | – |
| 2 | Ron Capps | 2608 | −2 |
| 3 | Mike Neff | 2497 | −113 |
| 4 | Cruz Pedregon | 2429 | −181 |
| 5 | Courtney Force | 2383 | −227 |
| 6 | Johnny Gray | 2357 | −253 |
| 7 | Robert Hight | 2302 | −308 |
| 8 | Tim Wilkerson | 2293 | −317 |
| 9 | John Force | 2281 | −329 |
| 10 | Jeff Arend | 2267 | −343 |

Pro Stock
| Position | Driver | Points | Points Back |
|---|---|---|---|
| 1 | Allen Johnson | 2756 | – |
| 2 | Jason Line | 2571 | −185 |
| 3 | Vincent Nobile | 2512 | −244 |
| 4 | Erica Enders | 2507 | −249 |
| 5 | Greg Anderson | 2365 | −391 |
| 6 | Mike Edwards | 2347 | −409 |
| 7 | V. Gaines | 2324 | −432 |
| 8 | Ron Krisher | 2290 | −466 |
| 9 | Jeg Coughlin Jr. | 2271 | −485 |
| 10 | Larry Morgan | 2198 | −558 |

Pro Stock Motorcycle
| Position | Driver | Points | Points Back |
|---|---|---|---|
| 1 | Eddie Krawiec | 2773 | – |
| 2 | Andrew Hines | 2691 | −83 |
| 3 | Hector Arana Jr. | 2502 | −271 |
| 4 | Hector Arana | 2432 | −341 |
| 5 | Karen Stoffer | 2386 | −387 |
| 6 | Matt Smith | 2370 | −403 |
| 7 | Scott Pollacheck | 2323 | −450 |
| 8 | Michael Ray Jr | 2316 | −457 |
| 9 | LE Tonglet | 2292 | −481 |
| 10 | Shawn Gann | 2239 | −534 |
