= 1997 NHRA Winston Drag Racing Series season =

1997 NHRA Drag Racing Season
- League: NHRA
- Sport: Drag racing
- Champions: Gary Scelzi (Top Fuel); John Force (Funny Car); Jim Yates (Pro Stock); Matt Hines (Pro Stock Bike)

NHRA seasons
- ← 1996 1998 →

The NHRA Winston Drag Racing Series was a series of drag racing races which took place from 1975 and 2001. The series is currently known as the NHRA Mission Foods Drag Racing Series. It is the top competition division that is in the NHRA.

These are the results for the 1997 Season.

== Schedule ==
1997 NHRA Winston Drag Racing Series Schedule
Date	Race	Site	Winners			
Date	Race	Site	Top Fuel	Funny Car	Pro Stock	Pro Stock Bike
January 30–February 2	Chief Auto Parts Winternationals	Pomona, California	Gary Scelzi	John Force	Warren Johnson	N/A
February 20–23	ATSCO Nationals	Phoenix, Arizona	Gary Scelzi	John Force	Jim Yates	N/A
March 6–9	Mac Tools Gatornationals	Gainesville, Florida	Joe Amato	Al Hofmann	Jim Yates	David Schultz
March 20–23	Slick 50 Nationals Presented By Western Auto	Houston, Texas	Joe Amato	Tony Pedregon	Tom Martino	John Myers
April 4–6	Winston Invitational Non Points Race	Rockingham, North Carolina	Kenny Bernstein	John Force	Warren Johnson	Angelle Seeling
April 10–13	Fram NHRA Nationals	Atlanta, Georgia	Kenny Bernstein	Randy Anderson	Jim Yates	John Myers
April 24–27 Original Weekend /// Finished May 10	Pennzoil Nationals Presented By Trak Auto	Richmond, Virginia	Gary Scelzi	Chuck Etchells	Warren Johnson	Matt Hines
May 1–4	Castrol Lone Star Nationals	Dallas, Texas	Joe Amato	Randy Anderson	Warren Johnson	N/A
May 14–17	Mopar Parts Nationals	Englishtown, New Jersey	Cristen Powell	Kenji Okazaki	Darrell Alderman	Matt Hines
May 29–June 1	Western Auto Parts America Nationals Presented By Slick 50	Topeka, Kansas	Scott Kalitta	Whit Bazemore	Scott Geoffrion	N/A
June 12–15	Pontiac Excitement Nationals Presented By Summit Racing	Columbus, Ohio	Gary Scelzi	Tom Hoover	Tom Martino	Matt Hines
June 26–29	Sears Craftsman NHRA Nationals	Madison, Illinois	Joe Amato	Ron Capps	Warren Johnson	John Smith
July 17–20	Mopar Parts Mile-High NHRA Nationals	Denver, Colorado	Cory McClenathan	Whit Bazemore	Jim Yates	Matt Hines
July 25–27	NHRA Autolite Nationals	Sonoma, California	Cory McClenathan	Ron Capps	Jim Yates	N/A
August 1–3	NHRA Northwest Nationals	Seattle, Washington	Cory McClenathan	Whit Bazemore	Mike Edwards	N/A
August 14–17	NHRA Champion Auto Stores Nationals	Brainerd, Minnesota	Cory McClenathan	John Force	Kurt Johnson	Matt Hines
August 27-September 1	U.S. Nationals	Indianapolis, Indiana	Jim Head	Whit Bazemore	Kurt Johnson	John Myers
September 11–14	NHRA Pioneer Keystone Nationals	Reading, Pennsylvania	Cory McClenathan	John Force	Jim Yates	Matt Hines
September 25–28	Sears Craftsman Nationals	Topeka, Kansas	Kenny Bernstein	John Force	Jim Yates	Angelle Seeling
October 2–5	AutoZone NHRA Nationals Presented By Pennzoil	Memphis, Tennessee	Jim Head	John Force	Jim Yates	Matt Hines
October 16–19	NHRA Revell Nationals Presented By HiLo/O'Reilly Auto Parts	Dallas, Texas	Cory McClenathan	Al Hofmann	Jim Yates	N/A
October 23–26	Matco Tools SuperNationals	Houston, Texas	Gary Scelzi	Dean Skuza	Jeg Coughlin	N/A
November 6–9	NHRA Winston Finals	Pomona, California	Joe Amato	Tony Pedregon	Kurt Johnson	Matt Hines

== Points ==
Points were awarded as follows:

=== Qualifying ===
Position	Base	1st	2nd	3rd	4th	5th	6th	7th	8th	9th	10th	11th	12th	13th	14th	15th	16th	17th+
Points	10	8	7	6	5	4	4	3	3	2	2	2	2	1	1	1	1	0

=== Eliminations ===
Position	W	RU	SL	R2L	R1L	ET
Points	100	80	60	40	20	20

== Points Standings ==
=== Legend ===
Color	Result
Gold	Winner
Silver	Runner Up
Bronze	Semi Loser
Green	Round 2 Loser
Blue	Round 1 Loser
Red	Did Not Qualify
Blank	Did Not Enter
Font	Definition
Regular	Elimination Points
Superscript	Qualifying Points
*	Elapsed Time National Record

=== Top Fuel ===
Position	Driver	POM	PHO	GAI	HOU	ATL	RCH	ENN	ENG	TOP	COL	MAD	DEN	SON	SEA	BRA	IND	REA	TOP2	MEM	ENN2	HOU2	POM2	Points
1	Gary Scelzi	100^{18}	100^{14}	60^{16}	60^{15}	80^{18}	100^{18}	60^{14}	60^{14}	80^{17}	100^{15}	80^{18}	40^{12}	40^{16}	80^{18}	20^{16}	40^{17}	20^{16}	60^{17}	60^{17}	60^{16}	100^{18}	80^{17}	1837
2	Cory McClenathan	60^{14}	20^{11}	40^{17}	40^{17}	40^{12}	80^{17}	60^{16}	40^{13}	20^{16}	40^{17}	40^{14}	100^{18}	100^{14}	100^{14}	100^{17}	80^{16}	100^{14}	20^{16}	40^{18}	100^{18}	60^{16}	40^{15}	1660
3	Joe Amato	*80^{16}	20^{13}	100^{18}	100^{18}	20^{14}	20^{14}	100^{18}	20^{18}	60^{18}	60^{18}	100^{17}	20^{17}	60^{17}	40^{17}	40^{18}	40^{18}	40^{11}	80^{18}	20^{13}	80^{17}	20^{17}	100^{12}	1597
4	Scott Kalitta	40^{11}	40^{14}	60^{14}	40^{12}	0^{10}	40^{13}	40^{15}	60^{15}	100^{14}	60^{12}	60^{16}	40^{13}	80^{15}	20^{13}	60^{14}	20^{11}	60^{18}	20^{12}	40^{14}	60^{15}	40^{14}	20^{16}	1301
5	Kenny Bernstein	60^{17}	80^{15}	40^{15}	20^{12}	100^{13}	40^{13}	20^{12}	20^{17}	40^{15}	20^{13}	60^{15}	20^{11}	40^{13}	40^{16}	20^{11}	20^{12}	80^{14}	100^{14}	40^{15}	20^{12}	60^{11}	40^{13}	1279
6	Bob Vandergriff	20^{13}	40^{17}	40^{12}	80^{16}	0^{10}	60^{16}	40^{13}	20^{14}	20^{11}	20^{11}	40^{14}	40^{11}	20^{12}	40^{13}	80^{13}	60^{13}	20^{12}	40^{13}	20^{11}	40^{13}	40^{13}	20^{12}	1083
7	Larry Dixon, Jr.	20^{12}	20^{12}	0^{10}	20^{11}	40^{11}	20^{15}	80^{17}	40^{16}	20^{12}	40^{12}	20^{11}	20^{13}	20^{11}	60^{14}	40^{14}	20^{15}	40^{15}	40^{11}	80^{16}	40^{12}	80^{13}	20^{18}	1071
8	Mike Dunn	20^{15}	60^{13}	80^{12}	40^{12}	20^{14}	60^{11}	20^{12}	20^{13}	40^{13}	40^{14}	20^{12}	60^{12}	40^{14}	20^{12}	20^{12}	20^{12}	40^{12}	20^{15}	60^{14}	20^{12}	20^{14}	20^{14}	1044
9	Jim Head	20^{12}	20^{12}	40^{12}	20^{14}	60^{12}	0^{10}	0^{10}	20^{11}	0^{10}	20^{11}	20^{13}	20^{14}	0^{10}	20^{12}	40^{13}	100^{13}	60^{17}	20^{13}	100^{13}	20^{14}	20^{15}	60^{14}	955
10	Shelly Anderson	40^{14}	40^{16}	20^{13}	60^{13}	20^{12}	20^{11}	40^{13}	40^{12}	20^{12}	20^{13}	40^{13}	20^{12}	20^{11}	20^{12}	20^{11}	20^{11}	40^{13}	40^{12}	40^{12}	0^{10}	20^{12}	20^{11}	889
11	Bruce Sarver	20^{12}	20^{12}	20^{12}	20^{12}	20^{15}	40^{12}	40^{14}	80^{12}	60^{14}	20^{12}	40^{12}	20^{14}	20^{12}			20^{14}	20^{13}	60^{14}	20^{12}	20^{13}	20^{12}	20^{13}	856
12	Eddie Hill	0^{10}	20^{11}	20^{11}	0^{10}	40^{12}	20^{11}	20^{12}	20^{12}	20^{12}	20^{16}	20^{12}	20^{16}	20^{18}	60^{12}	60^{15}	40^{12}	20^{11}	20^{12}	20^{12}	40^{12}	40^{12}	40^{12}	853
13	Tony Schumacher	0^{10}	40^{12}	20^{13}	0^{10}	60^{11}	20^{12}	20^{11}	20^{12}	20^{12}	80^{14}	20^{12}	80^{12}	20^{12}	40^{11}	20^{12}	0^{10}	20^{11}	40^{11}	0^{10}	0^{10}	20^{11}	20^{12}	811
14	Cristen Powell	40^{13}	0^{10}	20^{11}	20^{11}	20^{11}	20^{11}		100^{11}		20^{12}		40^{15}		20^{15}	20^{12}	40^{14}	20^{12}			40^{14}		60^{11}	663
15	Doug Herbert	20^{11}	20^{11}	0^{10}	0^{10}	20^{11}	0^{10}	0^{10}	40^{11}	20^{11}	20^{11}	20^{11}	60^{11}			20^{12}	0^{10}			20^{11}	20^{11}	20^{11}	20^{11}	514
16	Rhonda Hartman	0^{10}		0^{10}		0^{10}	0^{10}	20^{11}	20^{11}	40^{13}	0^{10}	0^{10}					60^{11}	20^{11}	20^{11}	20^{12}	0^{10}	40^{11}	0^{10}	411
17	Pat Dakin			20^{11}	20^{13}		20^{12}		0^{10}		0^{10}	20^{11}					20^{11}	20^{12}	20^{12}		20^{11}	20^{12}		305
18	Connie Kalitta	40^{12}	60^{18}	20^{14}	40^{14}	40^{17}																		275
19	David Grubnic	0^{10}	20^{11}		20^{11}			20^{11}		20^{11}				20^{11}	20^{11}		0^{10}				0^{10}		0^{10}	226
20	Spike Gorr	20^{11}	0^{10}		0^{10}			0^{10}					20^{11}	60^{11}			0^{10}				20^{11}	0^{10}	0^{10}	224
21	Tommy Johnson Jr.			20^{11}	20^{11}	20^{13}	20^{14}	20^{12}		40^{11}														212
22	Tim Gibson	0^{10}	0^{10}		0^{10}			0^{10}						0^{10}	20^{11}				20^{11}			0^{10}	40^{11}	173
=	Mike Smith			0^{10}					0^{10}		40^{11}	20^{11}					0^{10}	0^{10}		20^{11}	0^{10}	0^{10}		173
24	Dave Promnitz	20^{11}	0^{10}		0^{10}									40^{12}			0^{10}				0^{10}	0^{10}	0^{10}	143
25	Doug Foxworth				0^{10}	0^{10}		20^{11}		0^{10}								0^{10}		0^{10}	20^{11}	0^{10}		122
26	Paul Romine					20^{16}	40^{12}										20^{12}							120
27	Robert Reehl	0^{10}	0^{10}											20^{13}	20^{11}		0^{10}						0^{10}	104
28	Vicky Fanning							0^{10}					0^{10}			40^{11}		0^{10}		0^{10}	0^{10}			101
29	Terry Mullins																			20^{11}		0^{10}	0^{10}	51
30	Luigi Novelli					0^{10}						0^{10}					0^{10}			0^{10}				40
31	Marshall Topping	0^{10}	0^{10}	0^{10}																				30
32	David Busby									0^{10}		0^{10}												20
33	Jim Bailey											0^{10}												10
=	Wayne Bailey										0^{10}													10
=	Bobby Baldwin																						0^{10}	10
=	Fred Farndon																					0^{10}		10
=	Bruce Litton																0^{10}							10
=	Glenn Mikres												0^{10}											10
=	Shirley Muldowney																				0^{10}			10
=	Jack Ostrander			0^{10}																				10
=	Rit Pustari																	0^{10}						10
=	Mike Ranney												0^{10}											10
=	Gary Ritter												0^{10}											10
=	Ron Smith														0^{10}									10

=== Funny Car ===
Position	Driver	POM	PHO	GAI	HOU	ATL	RCH	ENN	ENG	TOP	COL	MAD	DEN	SON	SEA	BRA	IND	REA	TOP2	MEM	ENN2	HOU2	POM2	Points
1	John Force	100^{18}	100^{16}	40^{16}	40^{15}	80^{18}	60^{18}	80^{18}	60^{15}	40^{13}	20^{12}	60^{17}	60^{15}	40^{13}	60^{17}	100^{16}	60^{18}	100^{17}	100^{18}	100^{13}	80^{14}	60^{13}	80^{15}	1865
2	Tony Pedregon	60^{15}	20^{13}	20^{12}	100^{16}	60^{15}	20^{14}	40^{14}	20^{13}	40^{18}	20^{15}	20^{13}	40^{17}	80^{18}	80^{13}	60^{17}	40^{14}	20^{11}	60^{15}	40^{17}	60^{16}	80^{18}	100^{17}	1411
3	Whit Bazemore	40^{12}	60^{12}	0^{10}	60^{17}	40^{11}	20^{11}	40^{12}	40^{14}	100^{13}	80^{17}	40^{12}	100^{18}	40^{12}	100^{16}	40^{18}	100^{17}	40^{16}	60^{17}	0^{10}	20^{14}	40^{12}	40^{14}	1405
4	Chuck Etchells	40^{13}	40^{12}	40^{12}	60^{14}	20^{13}	100^{16}	40^{14}	80^{18}	20^{14}	20^{14}	40^{14}	80^{12}	60^{15}	20^{15}	40^{13}	40^{15}	80^{18}	40^{13}	40^{14}	40^{15}	20^{16}	20^{18}	1298
5	Ron Capps	0^{10}	20^{11}	20^{12}	0^{10}	20^{12}	40^{11}	20^{11}	60^{11}	20^{14}	20^{14}	100^{15}	40^{12}	100^{17}	20^{18}	80^{15}	60^{16}	20^{13}	40^{13}	60^{12}	60^{18}	40^{17}	40^{12}	1174
6	Randy Anderson	20^{12}	0^{10}	20^{15}	40^{14}	100^{14}	60^{13}	100^{16}	20^{16}	80^{17}	20^{18}	20^{18}	20^{14}	20^{11}	40^{12}	40^{14}	20^{14}	40^{13}	80^{14}	20^{18}	20^{11}	20^{12}	60^{11}	1167
7	Cruz Pedregon	20^{14}	0^{10}	40^{18}	80^{18}	40^{14}	80^{15}	60^{17}	20^{17}	40^{16}	40^{13}	80^{16}	20^{13}	20^{12}	40^{14}	20^{12}	40^{12}	60^{12}	0^{10}	80^{15}	0^{10}	60^{14}	20^{14}	1166
8	Dean Skuza	0^{10}	80^{15}	60^{14}	20^{11}	20^{12}	40^{12}	20^{12}	20^{13}	20^{15}	40^{11}	20^{13}	60^{14}	40^{12}	20^{13}	20^{14}	20^{11}	60^{14}	40^{11}	20^{13}	20^{13}	100^{14}	60^{16}	1083
9	Kenji Okazaki	20^{14}	40^{18}	20^{13}	40^{13}	20^{11}	40^{12}	20^{12}	100^{11}	60^{12}	60^{12}	20^{11}	20^{12}	60^{16}	40^{14}	20^{12}	40^{12}	0^{10}	20^{11}	20^{11}	0^{10}		40^{12}	959
10	Gary Densham	20^{13}	40^{17}	60^{13}	0^{10}	20^{17}	20^{14}	20^{11}	20^{12}	40^{11}	20^{16}	60^{12}	20^{16}	20^{11}	20^{12}	60^{13}	20^{13}	20^{12}	20^{12}	40^{11}	40^{13}	20^{13}	40^{12}	924
11	Del Worsham	20^{16}	60^{13}	20^{11}	40^{12}	20^{12}	0^{10}	20^{11}	40^{12}	20^{12}	60^{12}	20^{12}	20^{11}	20^{14}	60^{11}	40^{12}	20^{12}	20^{12}	40^{14}	20^{12}	20^{11}	20^{11}	20^{12}	885
12	Mark Oswald	0^{10}	0^{10}	80^{12}	20^{11}	40^{13}	20^{13}	60^{15}	20^{14}	20^{11}	40^{12}	20^{12}	20^{13}	20^{13}	20^{11}	20^{11}	20^{11}	40^{11}	20^{12}	20^{12}	40^{12}	40^{15}	20^{13}	867
13	Al Hofmann	80^{17}	20^{11}	100^{17}			20^{12}	20^{13}	20^{11}		0^{10}		20^{11}	20^{12}	40^{11}	20^{11}	0^{10}	20^{15}	20^{16}	60^{14}	100^{17}	20^{11}	20^{13}	832
14	Tim Wilkerson	20^{11}	20^{14}	20^{14}	20^{12}	60^{12}	20^{11}	20^{12}	40^{12}	60^{12}	20^{13}	0^{10}	20^{11}	40^{14}	20^{12}	20^{11}	80^{12}		20^{12}	40^{16}	40^{12}			813
15	Tom Hoover	40^{12}	0^{10}	40^{11}	20^{11}					20^{11}	100^{11}	40^{14}	40^{12}	20^{11}	20^{12}	20^{11}	20^{11}	20^{11}	20^{12}	0^{10}	20^{12}	40^{11}	0^{10}	683
16	Freddie Neely	0^{10}	20^{11}	20^{11}	20^{12}	20^{16}		0^{10}								20^{12}	20^{13}	20^{14}			0^{10}	20^{11}		290
17	Gary Bolger	40^{11}	20^{12}	20^{11}	20^{11}	40^{11}	20^{11}	0^{10}	0^{10}	0^{10}	0^{10}	0^{10}												277
18	Richard Hartman	60^{12}	20^{14}		20^{12}				20^{11}	0^{10}	40^{11}										20^{11}			261
19	Ray Higley	20^{11}	40^{12}	0^{10}			20^{17}	40^{13}			0^{10}	0^{10}		0^{10}	0^{10}									223
20	Mitch McDowell	0^{10}	0^{10}							0^{10}			40^{11}	20^{11}	20^{11}				20^{11}				20^{11}	205
21	Cory Lee					0^{10}	40^{12}	20^{11}	40^{12}	0^{10}		20^{11}												186
22	Jim Blake										20^{11}	40^{11}	0^{10}			0^{10}			20^{11}	20^{11}				164
23	Jim Epler																0^{10}	40^{12}		20^{12}	20^{12}	20^{12}		158
24	Wyatt Radke	20^{11}															0^{10}	20^{11}		20^{11}	20^{11}		0^{10}	144
25	Dale Creasy, Jr.															0^{10}	20^{11}	0^{10}	0^{10}	0^{10}	0^{10}	20^{12}	0^{10}	123
26	Mark Sievers	0^{10}	20^{11}												0^{10}								20^{11}	82
27	Ronny Young							0^{10}		20^{11}		0^{10}								0^{10}	0^{10}	0^{10}		81
28	Paul Smith			0^{10}		20^{11}						20^{11}												72
29	Dale Pulde									20^{12}													20^{11}	63
30	Norman Wilding			0^{10}															0^{10}		0^{10}	0^{10}	0^{10}	50
31	Jeff Arend				20^{13}	0^{10}																		43
32	Don Sosenka												0^{10}							0^{10}	0^{10}	0^{10}		40
33	Bobby Baldwin	0^{10}		0^{10}								0^{10}												30
=	Larry Gould							0^{10}		0^{10}		0^{10}												30
=	Leonard Seroka												0^{10}								0^{10}	0^{10}		30
=	Walt Fuller	0^{10}	0^{10}										0^{10}											30
37	Jerry Caminito								0^{10}									0^{10}						20
=	Greg Daebelliehn	0^{10}																					0^{10}	20
=	Brent Fanning																		0^{10}	0^{10}				20
=	Bob Weickgen't																	0^{10}		0^{10}				20
41	Dave Benjamin														0^{10}									10
=	Keith Jackson												0^{10}											10
=	Paula Martin		0^{10}																					10
=	Ricky Ruiz																						0^{10}	10

=== Pro Stock ===
Position	Driver	POM	PHO	GAI	HOU	ATL	RCH	ENN	ENG	TOP	COL	MAD	DEN	SON	SEA	BRA	IND	REA	TOP2	MEM	ENN2	HOU2	POM2	Points
1	Jim Yates	60^{18}	100^{17}	100^{15}	40^{17}	100^{17}	60^{14}	60^{13}	60^{18}	60^{18}	40^{18}	80^{18}	100^{18}	100^{18}	80^{15}	80^{15}	20^{15}	100^{18}	100^{17}	100^{14}	100^{17}	40^{15}	20^{18}	1963
2	Warren Johnson	*100^{17}	80^{18}	60^{18}	20^{18}	60^{18}	*100^{18}	100^{18}	20^{17}	20^{12}	40^{12}	100^{17}	60^{14}	60^{15}	60^{14}	60^{18}	20^{16}	60^{17}	20^{14}	20^{15}	80^{13}	40^{17}	60^{13}	1629
3	Kurt Johnson	80^{14}	40^{13}	60^{17}	60^{16}	80^{15}	80^{17}	40^{12}	40^{12}	40^{13}	40^{17}	60^{16}	80^{16}	40^{14}	60^{18}	100^{16}	100^{18}	40^{14}	20^{15}	20^{18}	40^{18}	20^{12}	100^{14}	1575
4	Bruce Allen	20^{12}	20^{11}	20^{13}	80^{12}	40^{14}	40^{12}	60^{15}	80^{16}	60^{17}	40^{15}	20^{15}	20^{15}	60^{13}	20^{11}	20^{13}	60^{11}	40^{13}	40^{14}	40^{14}	20^{12}	0^{10}	20^{12}	1110
5	Steve Schmidt	20^{13}	20^{11}	40^{14}	60^{15}	60^{11}	40^{16}	20^{14}	40^{14}	20^{14}	20^{11}	40^{12}	60^{17}	40^{13}	40^{17}	60^{17}	40^{17}	20^{12}	20^{11}	40^{11}	20^{16}	40^{14}	20^{15}	1085
6	Tom Martino	0^{10}	20^{11}	0^{10}	100^{13}	40^{12}	20^{12}	40^{12}	20^{11}	40^{13}	100^{13}	20^{11}	40^{12}	0^{10}	40^{12}	40^{12}	0^{10}	0^{10}	20^{11}	20^{13}	0^{10}	20^{11}	80^{11}	910
7	George Marnell	40^{11}	40^{14}	20^{12}	20^{12}	0^{10}	20^{14}	20^{11}	60^{12}	20^{14}	20^{14}	40^{14}	20^{13}	40^{17}	20^{13}	40^{12}	20^{12}	40^{15}	40^{12}	60^{12}	40^{11}	0^{10}	0^{10}	895
8	Troy Coughlin	40^{16}	40^{15}	20^{13}	40^{14}	20^{12}	20^{12}	40^{12}	40^{11}	0^{10}	80^{13}	0^{10}	20^{11}	0^{10}	20^{16}	0^{10}	20^{14}	0^{10}	0^{10}	0^{10}	60^{14}	60^{12}	40^{16}	831
9	Larry Morgan	0^{10}	0^{10}	0^{10}	20^{11}	40^{14}	0^{10}	0^{10}	0^{10}	80^{11}	0^{10}	0^{10}	20^{14}	40^{16}	40^{14}	40^{12}	40^{14}	60^{14}	40^{12}	40^{11}	20^{15}	20^{14}	60^{11}	823
10	Scott Geoffrion	0^{10}	0^{10}	0^{10}	0^{10}	20^{13}	0^{10}	80^{16}	40^{12}	100^{15}	20^{14}	60^{14}	20^{12}	0^{10}	20^{11}	20^{11}	60^{11}	0^{10}	40^{13}	20^{11}	20^{12}	20^{12}	20^{14}	821
11	Mike Edwards	20^{12}	0^{10}	80^{11}	0^{10}	20^{12}	0^{10}	40^{17}	20^{12}	20^{12}	20^{11}	20^{12}	20^{13}	20^{12}	100^{12}	20^{11}	0^{10}	40^{13}	80^{11}	0^{10}	0^{10}	0^{10}	40^{13}	814
12	Mark Pawuk	60^{14}	60^{14}	40^{14}	0^{10}	0^{10}	40^{13}	20^{12}	20^{13}	40^{12}	20^{12}	20^{12}	0^{10}	20^{12}	20^{11}	0^{10}	0^{10}	0^{10}	20^{13}	20^{13}	60^{12}	20^{11}	40^{11}	779
13	Darrell Alderman	0^{10}	20^{12}	40^{12}	0^{10}	0^{10}	60^{15}	0^{10}	100^{15}	20^{16}	40^{12}	20^{11}	20^{11}	0^{10}	0^{10}	20^{11}	0^{10}	0^{10}	0^{10}	60^{12}	0^{10}	20^{11}	0^{10}	668
14	Mike Bell						20^{11}	20^{11}	20^{13}	20^{11}	20^{11}	20^{13}	0^{10}	20^{11}	20^{13}	20^{13}	20^{12}	80^{16}	20^{16}	40^{17}	20^{11}	60^{13}	0^{10}	632
15	Mike Thomas	20^{12}	20^{12}	0^{10}	0^{10}	40^{13}	20^{11}	20^{13}	0^{10}	0^{10}	20^{11}	0^{10}	40^{12}	20^{11}	0^{10}	0^{10}	40^{12}	20^{12}	20^{12}	20^{16}	20^{14}	20^{16}	0^{10}	597
16	Pete Williams	40^{12}	40^{13}	20^{11}	20^{13}	20^{12}	20^{12}	20^{14}	20^{14}	40^{12}	60^{16}	40^{11}								0^{10}	0^{10}	0^{10}		510
17	Ron Krisher	0^{10}	0^{10}	0^{10}	20^{12}	20^{11}	0^{10}	0^{10}	0^{10}		0^{10}	0^{10}	20^{11}	20^{11}	20^{12}	20^{14}	40^{13}	20^{11}	20^{12}	0^{10}	0^{10}	0^{10}	20^{12}	449
=	Allen Johnson	20^{11}	0^{10}	0^{10}	0^{10}	0^{10}	0^{10}	0^{10}	20^{11}	0^{10}	0^{10}	0^{10}	40^{11}	0^{10}	0^{10}	20^{12}	0^{10}	0^{10}	60^{11}	0^{10}	0^{10}	40^{12}	20^{11}	449
19	V. Gaines		20^{11}	0^{10}	0^{10}	0^{10}	0^{10}	0^{10}	0^{10}	0^{10}	0^{10}	20^{11}	0^{10}	20^{12}	20^{12}	40^{14}	80^{13}	0^{10}	0^{10}	0^{10}	20^{11}	0^{10}	0^{10}	444
20	Terry Adams	0^{10}	0^{10}	20^{11}	20^{11}	20^{11}	20^{11}	20^{11}	20^{11}	0^{10}	20^{12}	40^{12}	40^{12}	0^{10}	0^{10}	0^{10}	0^{10}							392
21	Dester Cambron	20^{11}	20^{12}	0^{10}	20^{11}	0^{10}	0^{10}	0^{10}	0^{10}		0^{10}		0^{10}	80^{14}	40^{11}	20^{11}	0^{10}	0^{10}	0^{10}	0^{10}				380
22	Mark Osborne																	20^{11}	60^{18}	80^{11}	0^{10}	80^{18}	20^{17}	345
23	Ray Franks	0^{10}	0^{10}	40^{12}	40^{11}	20^{11}	0^{10}	0^{10}	0^{10}	0^{10}	0^{10}	0^{10}	0^{10}	0^{10}	0^{10}	0^{10}	0^{10}	0^{10}	0^{10}	0^{10}	0^{10}	0^{10}	0^{10}	324
24	Larry Nance		20^{12}	0^{10}		0^{10}	0^{10}	20^{11}	0^{10}	0^{10}	0^{10}		0^{10}	0^{10}	0^{10}		20^{11}	20^{11}	0^{10}	20^{12}			0^{10}	267
25	David Nickens	0^{10}			0^{10}	0^{10}		0^{10}		20^{11}	0^{10}	20^{13}	0^{10}	20^{12}			20^{11}		0^{10}	0^{10}	0^{10}	0^{10}	0^{10}	237
26	Jeg Coughlin Jr																				40^{13}	100^{11}	40^{12}	216
27	Grant Lewis			0^{10}		0^{10}			0^{10}								0^{10}	20^{12}	0^{10}	0^{10}	20^{12}	20^{13}	0^{10}	167
28	Rickie Smith	40^{13}	0^{10}	0^{10}	20^{12}	0^{10}	20^{11}	0^{10}													0^{10}			166
29	Frank Iaconio	20^{11}	0^{10}	0^{10}													20^{12}	20^{12}	0^{10}	20^{12}				157
30	Gordie Rivera		0^{10}							0^{10}				20^{11}	0^{10}						40^{11}		20^{12}	144
31	Larry Davis	0^{10}	0^{10}	0^{10}	0^{10}	0^{10}		0^{10}		0^{10}	0^{10}	0^{10}	0^{10}	0^{10}	0^{10}		0^{10}			0^{10}				140
32	Tom Hammonds								0^{10}	0^{10}	0^{10}	0^{10}	0^{10}	0^{10}	0^{10}	0^{10}	0^{10}	20^{11}						121
33	Danny Coffman	0^{10}	0^{10}	0^{10}		0^{10}	0^{10}			0^{10}	0^{10}	0^{10}					0^{10}		0^{10}	0^{10}				110
=	Arturo Delgado				0^{10}	0^{10}		0^{10}		0^{10}		0^{10}	0^{10}				0^{10}		0^{10}		0^{10}	0^{10}	0^{10}	110
=	Robert Patrick Jr.						0^{10}	0^{10}	0^{10}	0^{10}	0^{10}					0^{10}	0^{10}	0^{10}		0^{10}	0^{10}	0^{10}		110
36	Lewis Worden			20^{12}	0^{10}			0^{10}		0^{10}	0^{10}	0^{10}					0^{10}		0^{10}					102
37	Ed Heck			0^{10}	0^{10}	0^{10}	0^{10}		0^{10}		0^{10}	0^{10}					0^{10}	0^{10}		0^{10}				100
38	Brad Klein	0^{10}	0^{10}		0^{10}					0^{10}		0^{10}	0^{10}						0^{10}		0^{10}	0^{10}		90
39	Larry Peternel					0^{10}			0^{10}		0^{10}	0^{10}						0^{10}		0^{10}	0^{10}	0^{10}		80
40	Mark Ingersoll			20^{11}				0^{10}		0^{10}		0^{10}								0^{10}				71
41	Carty Beal		0^{10}		0^{10}	0^{10}		0^{10}		0^{10}			0^{10}						0^{10}					70
=	Tim Jost	0^{10}	0^{10}		0^{10}												0^{10}		0^{10}			0^{10}	0^{10}	70
43	Bob Benza			0^{10}		0^{10}			0^{10}			0^{10}					0^{10}	0^{10}						60
=	Barry Grant		0^{10}						0^{10}		0^{10}	0^{10}		0^{10}	0^{10}									60
=	Billy Huff	0^{10}	0^{10}		0^{10}	0^{10}	0^{10}										0^{10}							60
46	Robert Harman				0^{10}			0^{10}		0^{10}											0^{10}	0^{10}		50
=	Adam Landolfi			0^{10}			0^{10}		0^{10}								0^{10}	0^{10}						50
=	Jim Ray				0^{10}		0^{10}			0^{10}	0^{10}	0^{10}												50
=	Harry Scribner	0^{10}	0^{10}											0^{10}							0^{10}	0^{10}		50
50	Carl Beal				0^{10}	0^{10}							0^{10}						0^{10}					40
=	Jeff Wick											0^{10}							0^{10}		0^{10}	0^{10}		40

=== Pro Stock Motorcycle ===
Position	Driver	GAI	HOU	ATL	RCH	ENG	COL	MAD	DEN	BRA	IND	REA	TOP2	MEM	POM2	Points
1	Matt Hines	80^{17}	60^{18}	80^{15}	*100^{18}	*100^{18}	100^{18}	60^{18}	100^{17}	100^{18}	80^{18}	100^{18}	80^{18}	100^{17}	100^{17}	1525
2	John Myers	60^{16}	100^{17}	100^{16}	60^{15}	60^{15}	80^{17}	60^{17}	60^{14}	40^{15}	100^{17}	40^{14}	40^{15}	40^{14}	60^{16}	1118
3	David Schultz	*100^{18}	40^{14}	60^{17}	20^{14}	60^{17}	60^{15}	80^{16}	80^{18}	80^{16}	60^{16}	40^{15}	40^{16}	60^{16}	60^{12}	1080
4	John Smith	40^{15}	40^{13}	40^{14}	40^{16}	80^{16}	40^{13}	100^{15}	40^{13}	40^{14}	40^{14}	80^{16}	60^{14}	60^{15}	80^{14}	982
5	Angelle Seeling	40^{14}	60^{16}	20^{18}	40^{17}	40^{14}	60^{16}	40^{14}	40^{14}	60^{17}	60^{15}	60^{17}	100^{17}	80^{18}	40^{18}	965
6	Hector Arana	40^{13}	80^{15}	20^{11}	80^{14}	40^{14}	20^{11}	40^{14}	20^{12}	20^{11}	20^{11}	40^{12}	60^{14}	40^{14}	20^{12}	718
7	Greg Underdahl	40^{13}	20^{12}	60^{13}	20^{12}	20^{13}	20^{14}	40^{13}	60^{15}	60^{14}	40^{14}	20^{13}	20^{12}	20^{13}	40^{14}	665
8	Steve Johnson	60^{12}	20^{14}	20^{12}	40^{13}	40^{12}	40^{14}	20^{12}	20^{12}	20^{11}	40^{13}	20^{13}	40^{12}	40^{12}	40^{12}	634
9	Gary Tonglet	20^{12}	40^{12}	40^{13}	20^{13}	20^{12}	20^{12}	20^{12}	20^{16}	20^{13}	40^{13}	20^{14}	40^{12}	40^{13}	20^{13}	560
10	Stephanie Reaves	20^{12}	0^{10}	20^{11}	40^{12}	20^{12}	40^{13}	40^{12}	40^{13}	20^{13}	20^{12}	40^{12}	20^{13}	20^{12}	20^{12}	529
11	Ron Ayers	20^{12}	20^{12}	20^{11}	20^{11}	20^{11}	20^{11}	20^{13}	20^{12}	40^{12}	20^{12}	20^{12}	20^{12}	20^{12}	20^{13}	466
12	Redell Harris	0^{10}	40^{12}	0^{10}	0^{10}	0^{10}	0^{10}	20^{11}	20^{11}	20^{12}	20^{12}	20^{11}		20^{12}	20^{11}	322
13	Paul Gast	20^{14}		40^{14}		40^{13}	20^{11}					60^{12}			40^{15}	299
14	Geno Scali	0^{10}	20^{11}	0^{10}	20^{11}		20^{12}	20^{12}		40^{12}	20^{11}			20^{11}	20^{11}	291
15	C.J. Smith	0^{10}	0^{10}	0^{10}	20^{11}	20^{11}	40^{12}	20^{11}	0^{10}	20^{12}	20^{12}		20^{13}			282
16	Brian DeLong	20^{11}	20^{11}	0^{10}	0^{10}	0^{10}	0^{10}	20^{11}	20^{12}		20^{11}	20^{11}		20^{11}		258
17	Joseph Bartone	20^{11}	20^{13}	20^{12}	60^{12}	20^{11}	20^{12}									231
18	Joe DeSantis	0^{10}			20^{12}	20^{11}	20^{11}			0^{10}	20^{11}	0^{10}	20^{11}	20^{11}		217
19	Brian Ayers	0^{10}	0^{10}	0^{10}	0^{10}	0^{10}			40^{11}	20^{11}	0^{10}	20^{11}				173
20	Russell Nyberg	20^{11}	20^{11}	20^{12}	20^{11}	0^{10}										135
21	John Mafaro	20^{11}		20^{12}		20^{12}						20^{11}				126
22	Larry Cook								20^{11}	20^{11}					20^{11}	93
23	Rob Korn									0^{10}		0^{10}	20^{11}	0^{10}	0^{10}	71
24	Broderick Jackson		20^{11}	20^{11}												62
=	Nigel Patrick												20^{11}		20^{11}	62
26	Blaine Hale								0^{10}				20^{11}			41
=	Rob Short											0^{10}		20^{11}		41
28	Curt Woodward	0^{10}		0^{10}			0^{10}				0^{10}					40
29	Stephen Inoue								20^{11}							31
30	Bruce Dickson						0^{10}						0^{10}	0^{10}		30
=	Will Johnese	0^{10}	0^{10}								0^{10}					30
=	Horace Wright	0^{10}		0^{10}							0^{10}					30
33	Don DeTurck									0^{10}		0^{10}				20
=	Fumiki Tanaka	0^{10}													0^{10}	20
35	Richard Avon	0^{10}														10
=	Reggie Cole										0^{10}					10
=	Jeff DeWar				0^{10}											10
=	Bernard King		0^{10}													10
