= 2014 NHRA Mello Yello Drag Racing Series =

2014 NHRA Mello Yello Drag Racing Series season
- League: NHRA
- Sport: Drag racing
- Champions: Tony Schumacher (TF); Matt Hagan (FC); Erica Enders-Stevens (PS); Andrew Hines (PSM)

NHRA seasons
- ← 2013 2015 →

The 2014 NHRA Mello Yello Drag Racing Season was announced on August 29, 2013.

There were 24 Top Fuel, Funny Car, and Pro Stock car events, and 16 Pro Stock Motorcycle events scheduled.

== Schedule ==
2014 NHRA Mello Yello Schedule
Date	Race	Site	Winners			
Date	Race	Site	AA/TF Top Fuel Dragster	AA/FC Funny Car	Pro Stock	PS Motorcycle
February 6–9	Circle K NHRA Winternationals	Pomona, California	Khalid alBalooshi (1)	John Force (1)	Jason Line (1)	N/A
February 21–23	Carquest Auto Parts NHRA Arizona Nationals	Phoenix, Arizona	Antron Brown (1)	Alexis DeJoria (1)	Allen Johnson (1)	N/A
March 13–16	Amalie Motor Oil Gatornationals	Gainesville, Fla	Doug Kalitta (1)	Robert Hight (1)	Allen Johnson (2)	Steve Johnson (1)
March 28–30	SummitRacing.com NHRA Nationals	Las Vegas, Nev.	Tony Schumacher (1)	Alexis DeJoria (2)	Erica Enders-Stevens (1)	N/A
April 11–13	Dollar General Four-Wide Nationals^{1}	Concord, N.C.	Antron Brown (2)	Robert Hight (2)	Jimmy Ålund (1)	Andrew Hines (1)
April 25–27	O'Reilly Auto Parts NHRA Spring Nationals	Houston, Texas	Antron Brown (3)	Robert Hight (3)	Erica Enders-Stevens (2)	N/A
May 16–18	Summit Racing Equipment NHRA Southern Nationals^{2}	Atlanta, Ga.	Spencer Massey (1)	Robert Hight (4)	Jeg Coughlin (1)	Eddie Krawiec (1)
May 23–25	NHRA Kansas Nationals	Topeka, Kan.	Spencer Massey (2)	Courtney Force (1)	Allen Johnson (3)	N/A
May 29 – June 1	Toyota NHRA Summernationals	Englishtown, New Jersey	Richie Crampton (1)	Cruz Pedregon (1)	Jeg Coughlin (2)	Andrew Hines (2)
June 13–15	NHRA Ford Thunder Valley Nationals	Bristol, Tenn.	Shawn Langdon (1)	Tommy Johnson, Jr. (1)	Erica Enders-Stevens (3)	N/A
June 19–22	Auto Plus NHRA New England Nationals	Epping, N.H.	Tony Schumacher (2)	Ron Capps (1)	Dave Connolly (1)	Angie Smith (1)
June 26–29	O'Reilly Auto Parts Route 66 NHRA Nationals	Chicago, Ill.	Antron Brown (4)	Matt Hagan (1)	Vincent Nobile (1)	Hector Arana, Jr. (1)
July 3–6	Summit Racing Equipment NHRA Nationals	Norwalk, Ohio	Antron Brown (5)	John Force (2)	Erica Enders-Stevens (4)	Andrew Hines (3)
July 18–20	Mopar Mile-High NHRA Nationals	Denver, Colo.	J. R. Todd (1)	Robert Hight (5)	Allen Johnson (4)	Andrew Hines (4)
July 25–27	NHRA Sonoma Nationals	Sonoma, Calif.	Khalid alBalooshi (2)	Courtney Force (2)	Jason Line (2)	Eddie Krawiec (2)
August 1–3	O'Reilly Auto Parts NHRA Northwest Nationals	Seattle, Wash.	Doug Kalitta (2)	John Force (3)	Jason Line (3)	N/A
August 14–17	Lucas Oil NHRA Nationals^{3}	Brainerd, Minn.	Morgan Lucas (1)	Races abandoned before finals		N/A
August 27 – September 1	Chevrolet Performance NHRA U.S. Nationals	Brownsburg, IN	Richie Crampton (2)	Ron Capps (2)	Jason Line (4)	Eddie Krawiec (3)
August 27 – September 1	Chevrolet Performance NHRA U.S. Nationals	Brownsburg, IN	Richie Crampton (2)	Alexis DeJoria (3)	Shane Gray (1)	Eddie Krawiec (3)
2014 Countdown to One
September 12–14	NHRA Pep Boys Carolina Nationals^{4}	Concord, N.C.	Races abandoned before first round.			
September 18–21	AAA Texas NHRA Fall Nationals	Ennis, Texas	Tony Schumacher (3)	Matt Hagan (2)	Johnathan Gray (1)	Eddie Krawiec (4)
September 18–21	AAA Texas NHRA Fall Nationals	Ennis, Texas	Tony Schumacher (4)	Courtney Force (3)	Dave Connolly (2)	Andrew Hines (5)
September 26–28	AAA Insurance NHRA Midwest Nationals	St. Louis, MO	Antron Brown (6)	Courtney Force (4)	Dave Connolly (3)	Jerry Savoie (1)
October 2–5	Auto-Plus NHRA Nationals	Reading, Pa.	Tony Schumacher (5)	Matt Hagan (3)	Rodger Brogdon (1)	Eddie Krawiec (5)
October 30 – November 2	NHRA Las Vegas Nationals	Las Vegas, Nev.	Spencer Massey (3)	Del Worsham (1)	Erica Enders-Stevens (5)	Andrew Hines (6)
November 13–16	Automobile Club of Southern California NHRA Finals	Pomona, Calif.	Morgan Lucas (2)	Matt Hagan (4)	Erica Enders-Stevens (6)	Hector Arana Jr. (2)

- NOTE: All races will be televised on ESPN or ESPN2.

^{1} The rules for the 4 Wide Nationals differ from other races:

- All cars will qualify on each lane as all four lanes will be used in qualifying.
- Three rounds with cars using all four lanes.
- In Rounds One and Two, the top two drivers (of four) will advance to the next round.
- The pairings are set as follows:
  - Race One: 1, 8, 9, 16
  - Race Two: 4, 5, 12, 13
  - Race Three: 2, 7, 10, 15
  - Race Four: 3, 6, 11, 14
  - Semifinal One: Top two in Race One and Race Two
  - Semifinal Two: Top two in Race Three and Race Four
  - Finals: Top two in Semifinal One and Semifinal Two
- Lane choice determined by times in previous round. In first round, lane choice determined by fastest times.
- Drivers who advance in Rounds One and Two will receive 20 points for each round advancement.
- In Round Three, the winner of the race will be declared the race winner and will collect 40 points. The runner-up will receive 20 points. Third and fourth place drivers will be credited as semifinal losers.

^{2} Due to poor track conditions and rain, Final Eliminations were run on May 19.

^{3} Indianapolis: The first winner in Funny Car and Pro Stock (car) is the winner of the Brainerd round that was cancelled because of weather and darkness.

^{4} Texas Motorplex: Charlotte was cancelled because of rain and track conditions after the first round of Top Fuel and Funny Car had finished and half of the first round of Pro Stock (car) had concluded. Therefore, there are two full races at the Texas Motorplex for Pro Stock Motorcycle, one race and 3 1/2 rounds for Pro Stock, and one race and three rounds for the two nitro classes.

== Notable events ==
Morgan Lucas announced on October 14, 2013, that he was stepping aside from his full-time ride and announced his replacement driver, Richie Crampton.

Tommy Johnson, Jr. will now drive a funny car for Don Schumacher Racing, replacing Johnny Gray.

== Final standings ==
Top Fuel
Position	Driver	Points	Points Back	Chassis
1	Tony Schumacher	2594	–	DSR
2	J.R. Todd	2463	−131	Hadman
3	Spencer Massey	2430	−164	DSR
4	Shawn Langdon	2419	−175	Hadman
5	Doug Kalitta	2407	−187	Hadman
6	Steve Torrence	2406	−188	Hadman
7	Antron Brown	2405	−189	DSR
8	Khalid al-Balooshi	2326	−268	Hadman
9	Richard Crampton	2299	−295	Lucas
10	Brittany Force	2249	−345	Ford

Funny Car
Position	Driver	Points	Points Back	Make
1	Matt Hagan	2628	–	Dodge
2	John Force	2585	−43	Ford
3	Tommy Johnson Jr.	2442	−186	Dodge
4	Courtney Force	2421	−207	Ford
5	Robert Hight	2414	−214	Ford
6	Del Worsham	2393	−235	Toyota
7	Alexis DeJoria	2382	−246	Toyota
8	Ron Capps	2375	−253	Dodge
9	Tim Wilkerson	2310	−318	Ford
10	Cruz Pedregon	2244	−384	Toyota

Pro Stock
Position	Driver	Points	Points Back	Make
1	Erica Enders-Stevens	2639	–	Chevrolet
2	Jason Line	2600	−39	Chevrolet
3	Dave Connolly	2481	−158	Chevrolet
4	Shane Gray	2463	−176	Chevrolet
5	Jeg Coughlin Jr.	2445	−194	Dodge
6	Allen Johnson	2403	−236	Dodge
7	Jonathan Gray	2385	−254	Chevrolet
8	Vincent Nobile	2364	−275	Chevrolet
9	V Gaines	2269	−370	Dodge
10	Chris McGaha	2168	−471	Chevrolet

Pro Stock Motorcycle
Position	Driver	Points	Points Back	Make
1	Andrew Hines	2689	–	Harley-Davidson
2	Eddie Krawiec	2620	−69	Harley-Davidson
3	Hector Arana Jr.	2472	−217	Buell
4	Matt Smith	2416	−273	Buell
5	Steve Johnson	2369	−320	Suzuki
6	Scotty Pollacheck	2350	−339	Buell
7	Hector Arana	2319	−370	Buell
8	John Hall	2253	−436	Buell
9	Angie Smith	2223	−466	Buell
10	Michael Ray Jr.	2144	−545	Buell
