= 1998 NHRA Winston Drag Racing Series season =

1998 NHRA Drag Racing Season
- League: NHRA
- Sport: Drag racing
- Champions: Gary Scelzi (Top Fuel); John Force (Funny Car); Warren Johnson (Pro Stock); Matt Hines (Pro Stock Bike); Larry Kopp (Pro Stock Truck)

NHRA seasons
- ← 1997 1999 →

The NHRA Winston Drag Racing Series was a series of drag racing races which took place from 1975 and 2001. The series is currently known as the NHRA Mission Foods Drag Racing Series. It is the top competition division that is in the NHRA.

These are the results for the 1998 Season.

This was the first season where Pro Stock Truck competed as a pro class in the series.

== Schedule ==
1998 NHRA Winston Drag Racing Series Schedule
Date	Race	Site	Winners				
Date	Race	Site	Top Fuel	Funny Car	Pro Stock	Pro Stock Bike	Pro Stock Truck
January 29–February 1	Chief Auto Parts Winternationals	Pomona, California	Larry Dixon	Ron Capps	Jim Yates	N/A	N/A
February 19–22	ATSCO Nationals	Phoenix, Arizona	Cory McClenathan	Chuck Etchells	Warren Johnson	N/A	N/A
March 5–8 Planned // Rescheduled March 13-14	Mac Tools Gatornationals	Gainesville, Florida	Kenny Bernstein	Cruz Pedregon	Warren Johnson	Matt Hines	N/A
March 19–22	Pennzoil Nationals Presented By HiLo/O'Reilly Auto Parts	Houston, Texas	Cory McClenathan	Tony Pedregon	Warren Johnson	N/A	David Nickens
April 3–5	Winston Invitational No Points Special Event	Rockingham, North Carolina	Kenny Bernstein	Cruz Pedregon	Mark Osborne	Antron Brown	N/A
April 16–19 // Race Finished April 20	Fram NHRA Nationals	Atlanta, Georgia	Cory McClenathan	Cruz Pedregon	Mark Osborne	Matt Hines	Larry Kopp
April 23–26	Pennzoil Nationals Presented By Trak Auto	Richmond, Virginia	Cory McClenathan	Chuck Etchells	Warren Johnson	Matt Hines	N/A
April 30-May 3	Castrol Lone Star Nationals Presented By HiLo/O'Reilly Auto Parts	Dallas, Texas	Joe Amato	Ron Capps	Mike Edwards	N/A	N/A
May 14–17	Mopar Parts Nationals	Englishtown, New Jersey	Joe Amato	John Force	Jeg Coughlin	Angelle Seeling	Larry Kopp
May 28–31	Fram Route 66 Nationals	Chicago, Illinois	Kenny Bernstein	Whit Bazemore	Mike Thomas	Matt Hines	Larry Kopp
June 11–14	Pontiac Excitement Nationals Presented By Summit Racing	Columbus, Ohio	Kenny Bernstein	Frank Pedregon	Jeg Coughlin	Matt Hines	N/A
June 25–28	Sears Craftsman NHRA Nationals	Madison, Illinois	Gary Scelzi	Frank Pedregon	Kurt Johnson	Matt Hines	Tim Freeman
July 16–19	Mopar Parts Mile-High NHRA Nationals	Denver, Colorado	Cory McClenathan	Tony Pedregon	Jeg Coughlin	Matt Hines	N/A
July 24–26	NHRA Autolite Nationals	Sonoma, California	Doug Kalitta	Cruz Pedregon	Warren Johnson	N/A	John Lingenfelter
July 31–August 2	Prolong Super Lubricants NHRA Northwest Nationals Presented By Al's Auto Supply	Seattle, Washington	Joe Amato	Ron Capps	Warren Johnson	N/A	Craig Eaton
August 20–23	VisionAire NorthStar Nationals	Brainerd, Minnesota	Gary Scelzi	Ron Capps	Tom Martino	Matt Hines	N/A
September 2-7	U.S. Nationals	Indianapolis, Indiana	Gary Scelzi	John Force	Mike Edwards	Matt Hines	Larry Kopp
September 17–20	NHRA Pioneer Keystone Nationals	Reading, Pennsylvania	Gary Scelzi	Dean Skuza	Kurt Johnson	Angelle Seeling	N/A
October 1-4 Original Weekend // Resumed Weekend October 16-17	NHRA Parts America Nationals	Topeka, Kansas	Cory McClenathan	Ron Capps	Warren Johnson	N/A	Craig Eaton
October 8–11	AutoZone NHRA Nationals Presented By Pennzoil	Memphis, Tennessee	Joe Amato	Al Hofmann	Warren Johnson	Angelle Seeling.	Bob Panella Jr.
October 22–25	NHRA Revell Nationals Presented By HiLo/O'Reilly Auto Parts	Dallas, Texas	Gary Scelzi	John Force	Warren Johnson	N/A	Larry Kopp
October 29–November 1 // Finished On November 2	Matco Tools SuperNationals	Houston, Texas	Gary Scelzi	Cruz Pedregon	Jeg Coughlin	John Smith	N/A
November 12–15	NHRA Winston Finals	Pomona, California	Kenny Bernstein	Chuck Etchells	Richie Stevens	Matt Hines	Brad Jeter
