= 2015 NHRA Mello Yello Drag Racing Series =

2015 NHRA Mello Yello Drag Racing Series season
- League: NHRA
- Sport: Drag racing
- Champions: Antron Brown (TF); Del Worsham (FC); Erica Enders-Stevens (PS); Andrew Hines (PSM)

NHRA seasons
- ← 2014 2016 →

The 2015 NHRA Mello Yello Drag Racing Season was announced on August 25, 2014.

There were 24 Top Fuel, Funny Car, and Pro Stock car events, and 16 Pro Stock Motorcycle events scheduled.

== Schedule ==
2015 NHRA Mello Yello Schedule
Date	Race	Site	Winners			
Date	Race	Site	Top Fuel Dragster	Top Fuel Funny Car	Pro Stock	PS Motorcycle
February 5–8	Circle K NHRA Winternationals	Pomona, California	Shawn Langdon (1)	Matt Hagan (1)	Jason Line (1)	N/A
February 20–22	CARQUEST Auto Parts NHRA Arizona Nationals	Phoenix, AZ	Tony Schumacher (1)	Matt Hagan (2)	Rodger Brogdon (1)	N/A
March 12–15	Amalie Motor Oil NHRA Gatornationals	Gainesville, Fla.	Spencer Massey (1)	Ron Capps (1)	Greg Anderson (1)	Karen Stoffer (1)
March 27–29	NHRA Four-Wide Nationals^{1}	Concord, N.C.	Antron Brown (1)	Jack Beckman (1)	Larry Morgan (1)	Andrew Hines (1)
April 10–12	NHRA SummitRacing.com Nationals	Las Vegas, Nev.	Richie Crampton (1)	John Force (1)	Erica Enders-Stevens (1)	N/A
April 24–26	O'Reilly Auto Parts NHRA SpringNationals	Houston, Texas	Doug Kalitta (1)	Ron Capps (2)	Erica Enders-Stevens (2)	N/A
May 15–17	Summit Racing Equipment NHRA Southern Nationals	Atlanta, Ga.	Antron Brown (2)	Tim Wilkerson (1)	Jason Line (2)	Hector Arana (1)
May 22–24	NHRA Kansas Nationals	Topeka, Kan.	Richie Crampton (2)	Jack Beckman (2)	Erica Enders-Stevens (3)	N/A
June 4–7	Toyota NHRA Summernationals	Englishtown, N.J.	Antron Brown (3)	Matt Hagan (3)	Greg Anderson (2)	Jerry Savoie (1)
June 12–14	NHRA New England Nationals	Epping, N.H.	Tony Schumacher (2)	John Force (2)	Greg Anderson (3)	N/A
June 19–21	NHRA Thunder Valley Nationals	Bristol, Tenn.	Richie Crampton (3)	Matt Hagan (4)	Erica Enders-Stevens (4)	N/A
July 2–5	Summit Racing Equipment NHRA Nationals	Norwalk, Ohio	Doug Kalitta (2)	Jack Beckman (3)	Greg Anderson (4)	Karen Stoffer (2)
July 9–12	Route 66 NHRA Nationals	Chicago, Ill.	Tony Schumacher (3)	Tommy Johnson, Jr. (1)	Allen Johnson (1)	Hector Arana, Jr. (1)
July 24–26	Mopar Mile-High NHRA Nationals	Denver, Colo.	Steve Torrence (1)	Jack Beckman (4)	Larry Morgan (2)	Eddie Krawiec (1)
July 31 – August 2	NHRA Sonoma Nationals	Sonoma, Calif.	Antron Brown (4)	Jack Beckman (5)	Chris McGaha (1)	Eddie Krawiec (2)
August 7–9	NHRA Northwest Nationals	Seattle, Wash.	J. R. Todd (1)	Tommy Johnson, Jr. (2)	Chris McGaha (2)	N/A
August 20–23	Lucas Oil NHRA Nationals	Brainerd, Minn.	Richie Crampton (4)	Robert Hight (1)	Erica Enders-Stevens (5)	Eddie Krawiec (3)
September 2–7	Chevrolet Performance NHRA U.S. Nationals	Indianapolis, Ind.	Morgan Lucas (1)	Jack Beckman (6)	Erica Enders-Stevens (6)	Jerry Savoie (2)
2015 Countdown to One
September 18–20	NHRA Carolina Nationals	Concord, N.C.	Antron Brown (5)	Del Worsham (1)	Erica Enders-Stevens (7)	Andrew Hines (2)
September 25–27	AAA Insurance NHRA Midwest Nationals	St. Louis, MO	Antron Brown (6)	Del Worsham (2)	Drew Skillman (1)	Hector Arana, Jr. (2)
October 1–4	NHRA Keystone Nationals	Reading, Pa.	Antron Brown (7)	Jack Beckman (7)	Chris McGaha (3)	Andrew Hines (3)
October 15–18	AAA Texas NHRA Fall Nationals	Dallas, Texas	Richie Crampton (5)	Del Worsham (3)	Erica Enders-Stevens (8)	Jerry Savoie (3)
October 29 – November 1	NHRA Toyota Nationals	Las Vegas, Nev.	Doug Kalitta (3)	Robert Hight (2)	Erica Enders-Stevens (9)	Andrew Hines (4)
November 12–15	Automobile Club of Southern California NHRA Finals	Pomona, Calif.	Shawn Langdon (2)	Del Worsham (4)	Allen Johnson (2)	Eddie Krawiec (4)

- NOTE: All races will be televised on ESPN or ESPN2. This will be ESPN's last year televising the NHRA. Fox Sports will take over the rights in 2016.

^{1} The rules for the 4-Wide Nationals differ from other races:

- All cars will qualify on each lane as all four lanes will be used in qualifying.
- Three rounds with cars using all four lanes.
- In Rounds One and Two, the top two drivers (of four) will advance to the next round.
- The pairings are set as follows:
  - Race One: 1, 8, 9, 16
  - Race Two: 4, 5, 12, 13
  - Race Three: 2, 7, 10, 15
  - Race Four: 3, 6, 11, 14
  - Semifinal One: Top two in Race One and Race Two
  - Semifinal Two: Top two in Race Three and Race Four
  - Finals: Top two in Semifinal One and Semifinal Two
- Lane choice determined by times in previous round. In first round, lane choice determined by fastest times.
- Drivers who advance in Rounds One and Two will receive 20 points for each round advancement.
- In Round Three, the winner of the race will be declared the race winner and will collect 40 points. The runner-up will receive 20 points. Third and fourth place drivers will be credited as semifinal losers.

== Notable events ==
- The Qatar Racing Club terminated funding for all motorsports activities in North America, leaving the 2015 season plans for the Al-Anabi Racing Team in question.
- John Force Racing announced a multi-year agreement with General Motors to race under the Chevrolet brand. The team has also secured a Primary Sponsorship on John Force's car, and an Associate Sponsorship on his other cars from Peak Antifreeze and BlueDEF.
- NHRA and ESPN mutually agreed to end their television coverage agreement following the 2015 season. The 2016 season was to be the final year of a five-year rights extension deal that took effect in 2012.

== Final standings ==
Top Fuel
Pos.	Driver	Points	Points Back	Chassis
1	Antron Brown	2692	–	DSR
2	Tony Schumacher	2461	−231	DSR
3	Richie Crampton	2430	−262	MLR
4	Larry Dixon	2412	−280	Hadman
5	Doug Kalitta	2388	−304	Hadman
6	Shawn Langdon	2387	−305	DSR
7	Brittany Force	2363	−329	Force
8	Steve Torrence	2342	−350	Hadman
9	J.R. Todd	2307	−385	Hadman
10	Dave Connolly	2303	−389	Hadman

Funny Car
Pos.	Driver	Points	Points Back	Make
1	Del Worsham	2664	–	Toyota
2	Jack Beckman	2608	−56	Dodge
3	Tommy Johnson	2548	−116	Dodge
4	Ron Capps	2490	−174	Dodge
5	Matt Hagan	2418	−246	Dodge
6	Robert Hight	2370	−294	Chevrolet
7	John Force	2332	−332	Chevrolet
8	Alexis De Joria	2313	−351	Toyota
9	Cruz Pedregon	2286	−378	Toyota
10	Tim Wilkerson	2259	−405	Ford

Pro Stock
Pos.	Driver	Points	Points Back	Make
1	Erica Enders	2712	–	Chevrolet
2	Greg Anderson	2492	−220	Chevrolet
3	Allen Johnson	2443	−269	Dodge
4	Chris McGaha	2442	−270	Chevrolet
5	Drew Skillman	2433	−279	Chevrolet
6	Vincent Nobile	2389	−323	Chevrolet
7	Larry Morgan	2376	−336	Chevrolet
8	Jason Line	2331	−381	Chevrolet
9	Shane Gray	2299	−413	Chevrolet
10	Jonathan Gray	2286	−426	Chevrolet

Pro Stock Motorcycle
Pos.	Driver	Points	Points Back	Make
1	Andrew Hines	2608	–	Harley-Davidson
2	Eddie Krawiec	2565	−43	Harley-Davidson
3	Gerald Savoie	2550	−58	Suzuki
4	Matt Smith	2428	−180	Victory
5	Hector Arana Jr.	2419	−189	Buell
6	Chip Ellis	2400	−208	Buell
7	Karen Stoffer	2376	−232	Suzuki
8	Hector Arana	2323	−285	Buell
9	James Underdahl	2220	−388	Suzuki
10	Scott Pollacheck	2192	−416	Buell
