= 1999 NHRA Winston Drag Racing Series season =

1999 NHRA Drag Racing Season
- League: NHRA
- Sport: Drag racing
- Champions: Tony Schumacher (Top Fuel); John Force (Funny Car); Warren Johnson (Pro Stock); Matt Hines (Pro Stock Bike); Bob Panella Jr. (Pro Stock Truck)

NHRA seasons
- ← 1998 2000 →

The NHRA Winston Drag Racing Series was a series of drag racing races which took place from 1975 and 2001. The series is now known as the NHRA Mission Foods Drag Racing Series. It is the top competition division of the NHRA.

These are the results for the 1999 Season.

== Schedule ==
1999 NHRA Winston Drag Racing Series Schedule
Date	Race	Site	Winners				
Date	Race	Site	Top Fuel	Funny Car	Pro Stock	Pro Stock Bike	Pro Stock Truck
February 4–7 race finished Monday February 8	AutoZone Winternationals	Pomona, California	Mike Dunn	Tony Pedregon	Jeg Coughlin	N/A	Randy Daniels
February 25–28	Checker Schuck's Kragen Nationals Presented By Pennzoil	Phoenix, Arizona	Joe Amato	John Force	Kurt Johnson	N/A	N/A
March 18–21	Mac Tools Gatornationals	Gainesville, Florida	Mike Dunn	John Force	Warren Johnson	Angelle Seeling	Mark Osborne
April 8–11	O'Reilly Nationals Presented By Pennzoil	Houston, Texas	Doug Herbert	John Force	Kurt Johnson	N/A	Mark Osborne
April 22–25	Castrol Nationals Presented By O'Reilly Auto Parts	Dallas, Texas	Gary Scelzi	Tony Pedregon	Warren Johnson	Antron Brown	N/A
April 28–May 2 race finished Monday May 3	Pennzoil Nationals Presented By Trak Auto	Richmond, Virginia	Cory McClenathan	John Force	Allen Johnson	N/A	Brad Jeter
May 13–16	Advance Auto Parts NHRA Southern Nationals	Atlanta, Georgia	Gary Scelzi	John Force	Warren Johnson	Angelle Seeling	Randy Daniels
May 20–23 race finished Tuesday May 25	Mopar Parts Nationals	Englishtown, New Jersey	Joe Amato	John Force	Richie Stevens	Angelle Seeling	Mike Coughlin
June 3–6	Fram Route 66 Nationals	Chicago, Illinois	Mike Dunn	Tim Wilkerson	Warren Johnson	Matt Hines	Bob Panella Jr.
June 10–13	Pontiac Excitement Nationals Presented By Summit Racing	Columbus, Ohio	Doug Herbert	Phil Burkart	Warren Johnson	Antron Brown	John Coughlin
June 24–26	Sears Craftsman NHRA Nationals	Madison, Illinois	Gary Scelzi	John Force	Jim Yates	Angelle Seeling	Bob Panella Jr.
July 8–10 race finished Sunday July 11	Winston No Bull Showdown	Bristol, Tennessee	Class Competed With Funny Car	John Force	Jeg Coughlin	Matt Hines	Randy Daniels
July 15–18	Mopar Parts Mile-High NHRA Nationals	Denver, Colorado	Joe Amato	Tony Pedregon	Jeg Coughlin	David Schultz	N/A
July 30–August 1	Prolong Super Lubricants NHRA Northwest Nationals Presented By Al's Auto Supply	Seattle, Washington	Joe Amato	Del Worsham	Kurt Johnson	N/A	N/A
August 6–8	Autolite NHRA Nationals	Sonoma, California	Doug Kalitta	Whit Bazemore	Jim Yates	N/A	N/A
August 19–22	Colonel's Truck Accessories NHRA Nationals	Brainerd, Minnesota	Larry Dixon	John Force	Jeg Coughlin	Craig Treble	N/A
September 1–6	U.S. Nationals	Indianapolis, Indiana	Cory McClenathan	Frank Pedregon	Warren Johnson	Matt Hines	Mike Coughlin
September 16–19	True Value Keystone Nationals	Reading, Pennsylvania	Joe Amato	Tommy Johnson Jr.	Jeg Coughlin	Matt Hines	N/A
September 30-October 3 race finished Monday October 4	Advance Auto Parts Nationals	Topeka, Kansas	Doug Herbert	John Force	Mike Edwards	N/A	Bob Panella Jr.
October 7–10	AutoZone NHRA Nationals Presented By Pennzoil	Memphis, Tennessee	Doug Herbert	Tommy Johnson Jr.	Mike Edwards	Angelle Seeling.	Brad Jeter
October 21–24	O'Reilly Fall Nationals Presented By Castrol Syntec	Dallas, Texas	Tony Schumacher	John Force	Warren Johnson	N/A	Brad Jeter
October 28–31	Matco Tools SuperNationals Presented By Racing Champions	Houston, Texas	Larry Dixon	John Force	Rickie Smith	Tony Mullen	N/A
November 11–14	Automobile Club of Southern California NHRA Finals	Pomona, California	Mike Dunn	Jerry Toliver	Jeg Coughlin	Antron Brown	Steve Johns
