= NHRA Factory Stock Showdown =

Class of drag racing

Factory Stock Showdown
- Upcoming season or competition: 2026
- League: National Hot Rod Association
- Sport: Drag Racing
- Founded: 2012
- First season: 2016
- Most recent champion: Mark Pawuk (2025)
- Sponsor: Flexjet
- Website: https://nhra.com

Factory Stock Showdown (FSS) (in the NHRA), or Pro Stock (in the IHRA) is a class of drag racing designed to showcase the Chevrolet COPO Camaro, Dodge Challenger Drag Pak, and the Ford Mustang Cobra Jet.

FSS continues to be a fan favorite with growing popularity over the last ten years. The popularity of this class of racing is in large part due to the recognizable cars. All three of the types of cars that race in the FSS are standard monocoque chassis cars that are body in white from the factory with all drag racing running gear installed at the factory, using production chassis of the cars on the road.

While cars competing in FSS are of the same type you see on the road, they do have numerous safety enhancements and rules that are required to be eligible to run in FSS events. Cars are limited to 9" wide tires, must have full safety cages, independent fuel cells, weight limits and other general racing safety requirements. These safety enhancements are in place to allow these cars to run the 1/4 mile at speeds no faster than 7.50 seconds. Since its inception the FSS class has gone faster every year and the NHRA has put restrictions in place to ensure safety and parity between the cars

Drivers competing in the NHRA Factory Stock Showdown Series earn championships points at each of the NHRA National events at which they compete. The points are accumulated throughout the year, and an annual champion is crowned at the conclusion of the season.

While the NHRA FSS is the original and preeminent racing series for Factory Stock cars the growth and popularity of FSS racing has been seen through expansion in other series. These include the National Muscle Car Association's (NMCA) Factory Super Car series and Drag Illustrated's Factory Stock Classic as examples. In 2026, the International Hot Rod Association eliminated the traditional 500 cubic inch formula for Pro Stock in favour of using the "Pro Stock" moniker for Factory Stock Showdown cars.

== History ==
=== 2012 ===
The FSS class was started with a single event at the US Nationals.

Winner - Bo Butner

=== 2013 ===
FSS expanded to three events.

=== 2014 ===
FSS Expanded to four events.

=== 2016 ===
The School of Automotive Machinists and Technology (SAM Tech) became the series sponsor.

=== 2017 ===
SAM Tech NHRA Factory Stock Showdown added a fifth event.

Champion - David Barton

=== 2018 ===
Expanded to a seven-race series with a 16-car qualifying field.

Champion - Lean Pruett

=== 2019 ===
Expanded to and eight event schedule.

Champion - Drew Skillman

=== 2020 ===
Champion - Aaron Stanfield

=== 2021 ===
In 2021 Constant Aviation became the title sponsor and introduced the Factory Stock Showdown Bounty prize. The Bounty prize is a $1000 bounty that is put on the winner of the previous event. Whomever eliminates the holder of the Bounty at the next event earns the bonus. If the same driver wins the next event than the Bounty is rolled forward until it is awarded.

Champion - Aaron Stanfield

=== 2022 ===
Champion - David Barton

=== 2023 ===
In 2023 Flexjet will be the title sponsor and the series will be expanded from 8 to 10 races

Champion - Aaron Stanfield

=== 2024 ===
The schedule is reduced back to eight races. Mark Pawuk became the first Stellantis champion since 2017.

Champion - Mark Pawuk

=== 2025 ===
Champion - Mark Pawuk

=== 2026 ===
The series expands to a ninth round in the championship season, for a total of 9 of 20 rounds. However, because of weather issues, one round was abandoned (Martin, Michigan) and replaced with a doubleheader round in Madison, Illinois

== 2026 Flexjet NHRA Factory Stock Showdown Schedule. ==
Date	Event	Location
March 5-8	Amalie Motor Oil NHRA Gatornationals	Gainesville Raceway, Gainesville, Fl
April 24-26	NHRA Four-Wide Nationals	zMAX Dragway, Charlotte, NC
May 14-17	Gerber Collision & Glass Route 66 NHRA Nationals presented by PEAK	Route 66 Raceway, Chicago, IL
June 12-14	Super Grip NHRA Thunder Valley Nationals	Bristol Dragway, Bristol, Tenn.
June 25-28	Summit Racing Equipment NHRA Nationals	Summit Motorsports Park, Norwalk, Ohio
Sept. 2-7	Cornwell Quality Tools NHRA U.S. Nationals	Lucas Oil Indianapolis Raceway Park, Indianapolis
Oct. 2-4	NAPA Auto Parts Midwest Nationals Doubleheader	World Wide Technology Raceway, Madison, Illinois
Oct. 12–14	38th annual Texas NHRA FallNationals	Texas Motorplex, Ennis, Texas
