= Atlanta Dragway =

Racing facility in Banks County, Georgia

Darana Dragway Commerce
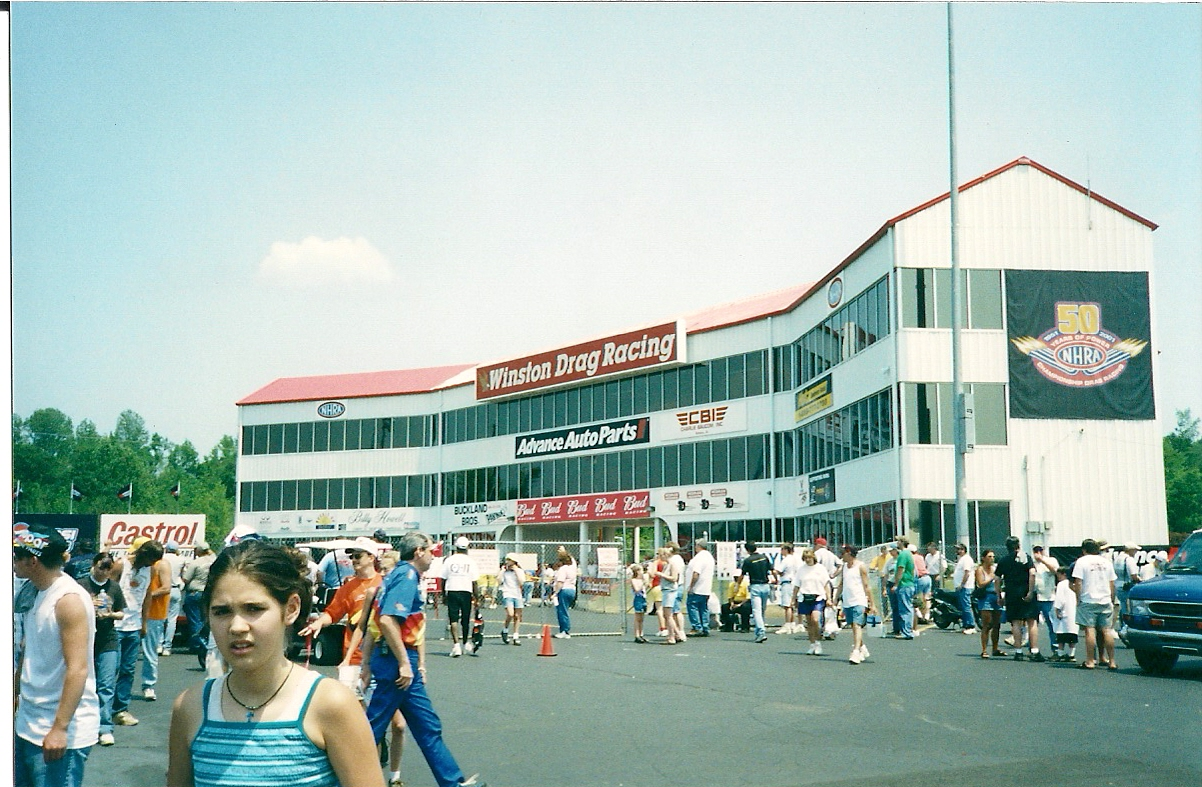
- Atlanta Dragway in 2001
- Location: Banks County, near Commerce, Georgia, United States
- Coordinates: 34°15′50.06″N 83°28′21.93″W
- Owner: International Hot Rod Association
- Address: 500 E. Ridgeway Road
- Opened: 1976
- Closed: 2021
- Major events: NHRA Mission Foods Drag Racing Series; NHRA Southern Nationals (1981–2021)
- Website: http://www.atlantadragway.com

Drag Strip
- Surface: Concrete
- Length: 0.125 mi (.201 km)

Darana Dragway Commerce is a proposed drag racing facility located in Banks County, Georgia, just north of Commerce, Georgia. Originally Atlanta Dragway from 1976 to its 2021 closure, the track hosted From 1981 until 2021, it hosted the NHRA Mission Foods Drag Racing Series Southern Nationals.

== History ==
Atlanta Dragway was built in 1975 by Gene Bennett and originally had been graded out for an airport. The original airport tower served as the original timing tower, and the track direction was the same as the airport without asphalt, just Georgia red clay. In 1980, the track was sold to Norman Pearah and became an NHRA-sanctioned track. Back then, the track was only opened twice a year for major events.

The track was purchased in 1987 by Pro Stock driver Gary Brown and partners J.D. Stevens and Rudy Bowen. The track underwent major reconstruction to put in new aluminum grandstand seating, permanent restrooms and rebuilt concession buildings. In 1989, the thirteen-year-old track was resurfaced with a concrete launching pad and a new timing system. In addition to the track modification, a reconditioned VIP tower complete with a timing deck, press center and corporate suites was built in 1990.

NHRA purchased the track in 1993. They resurfaced the track and added an updated timing system in 1999. The tower restrooms were remodeled and all concession, tower and ticket buildings were rewired. In 2003, the track's FM radio and public address system were both upgraded. In 2008 NHRA history was made at the track when Ashley Force Hood became the first female driver to win a Funny Car event. NHRA has announced intentions to sell the property after the 2021 meet.

NHRA announced that the "2021 NHRA Southern Nationals would be the final major NHRA national event to be held at historic Atlanta Dragway in Commerce, GA."

The property was sold to Terra Commerce for demolition of the tower (which was completed) and grandstands, but not the drag strip itself. On February 4, 2025, Banks County Planning Commission rejected Terra Commerce's plans to redevelop the venue as a mixed-use unit of over 1,200 homes and 300,000 square feet of commercial development in a unanimous vote, 5-0, after considerable objections by local residents.

Later in 2025, many drag racing insiders told Bobby Bennett's Competition Plus site that the International Hot Rod Association was considering purchasing the facility as part of expanding the 2026 schedule. A working draft of the IHRA's 2026 schedule speculates that the property could be acquired by the organisation, which would host 1/8 mile drag races as a late-autumn round after rebuilding, as the IHRA has committed itself in 2026 to exclusively participating in 1/8 mile drag racing. The announcement was posted in December 2025 for the sanctioning body's Drag Review magazine as a contracted track. The IHRA, however, was unable to formally announce the event during the December 11-14 Performance Racing Industry trade show in Indianapolis. The schedule announcement did, however, keep the proposed October date for the track open while the IHRA finishes negotiations with Banks County and contractors for the rebuilding that would include grandstands and a timing tower. The proposed date would be the season finals for the IHRA. IHRA official Scott Woodruff attended the Banks County Planning Commission meeting on February 3, 2026, where a 5-0 vote to zone the property for motorsport use cleared that hurdle. A week later, Banks County Board of Commissioners approved the conditional use permit for the track with a new provision prohibiting racing on Sundays before 12 noon. This permits the IHRA to close on the deal and prepare for construction work for the venue to permit racing for the intended IHRA World Finals on October 22-24, although the IHRA could move the event to a later date.

On February 18, 2026, the IHRA formally announced the acquisition of the circuit, with the IHRA Outlaw Nitro Series World Finals set for October 22-24, 2026. The race will be an eighth-mile event for professional categories, except IHRA Pro Stock (which under 2026 rules is the equivalent of the NHRA's Factory Stock Showdown) and some sportsman categories.

== Winners ==
Year	Top Fuel	Funny Car	Pro Stock	Pro Stock Motorcycle
1981	Shirley Muldowney	Tripp Shumake	Lee Shepherd	
1982	Lucille Lee	Raymond Beadle	Lee Shepherd	
1983	Gary Beck	Frank Hawley	Lee Shepherd	
1984	Joe Amato	Billy Meyer	Lee Shepherd	
1985	Don Garlits	Kenny Bernstein	Butch Leal	
1986	Dan Pastorini	Ed McCulloch	Warren Johnson	
1987	Darrell Gwynn	Kenny Bernstein	Bob Glidden	
1988	Eddie Hill	Ed McCulloch	Warren Johnson	
1989	Dick Lahaie	Mike Dunn	Bob Glidden	John Mafaro
1990	Lori Johns	Ed McCulloch	Larry Morgan	Dave Schultz
1991	Kenny Bernstein	Del Worsham	Bob Glidden	Dave Schultz
1992	Don Prudhomme	John Force	Don Beverley	Dave Schultz
1993	Eddie Hill	John Force	Warren Johnson	Dave Schultz
1994	Connie Kalitta	John Force	Scott Geoffrion	Dave Schultz
1995	Cory McClenathan	John Force	Mark Osborne	Dave Schultz
1996	Larry Dixon	Tony Pedregon	Kurt Johnson	Dave Schultz
1997	Kenny Bernstein	Randy Anderson	Jim Yates	John Myers
1998	Cory McClenathan	Cruz Pedregon	Mark Osborne	Matt Hines
1999	Gary Scelzi	John Force	Warren Johnson	Angelle Sampey
2000	Gary Scelzi	John Force	Jeg Coughlin	Angelle Sampey
2001	Mike Dunn	Frank Pedregon	Jim Yates	Antron Brown
2002	Larry Dixon	Whit Bazemore	Allen Johnson	Angelle Sampey
2003	Larry Dixon	Tony Pedregon	Warren Johnson	Geno Scali
2004	Cory McClenathan	Whit Bazemore	Greg Anderson	Angelle Sampey
2005	Doug Kalitta	John Force	Greg Anderson	GT Tonglet
2006	Doug Kalitta	Tony Pedregon	Dave Connolly	Antron Brown
2007	Brandon Bernstein	Robert Hight	Greg Anderson	Karen Stoffer
2008	Antron Brown	Ashley Force	Mike Edwards	Andrew Hines
2009	Morgan Lucas	Jack Beckman	Mike Edwards	Eddie Krawiec
2010	Larry Dixon	Robert Hight	Jeg Coughlin	Andrew Hines
2011	Antron Brown	Jack Beckman	Jason Line	LE Tonglet
2012	Steve Torrence	Ron Capps	Greg Anderson	Eddie Krawiec
2013	Antron Brown	Johnny Gray	Mike Edwards	N/A
2014	Spencer Massey	Robert Hight	Jeg Coughlin	Eddie Krawiec
2015	Antron Brown	Tim Wilkerson	Jason Line	Hector Arana
2016	Doug Kalitta	Matt Hagan	Jason Line	Eddie Krawiec
2017	Steve Torrence	Ron Capps	James E Butner III	LE Tonglet
2018	Leah Pruett	Courtney Force	Vincent Nobile	Eddie Krawiec
2019	Steve Torrence	Ron Capps	N/A	Andrew Hines
2020	Cancelled during the Covid-19 pandemic			
2021	Antron Brown	Bob Tasca III	Greg Anderson	Scotty Pollacheck
