= Houston Raceway Park =

Racetrack

- Location: Baytown, Texas, United States
- Coordinates: 29.7903°N 94.8807°W
- Capacity: 30,000
- Address: 2525 S Farm-to-Market 565 Road
- Opened: 1988
- Closed: 2023
- Former names: Royal Purple Raceway
- Major events: NHRA Camping World Drag Racing Series

Drag Strip
- Surface: Concrete/Asphalt
- Length: 0.250 mi (0.402 km)

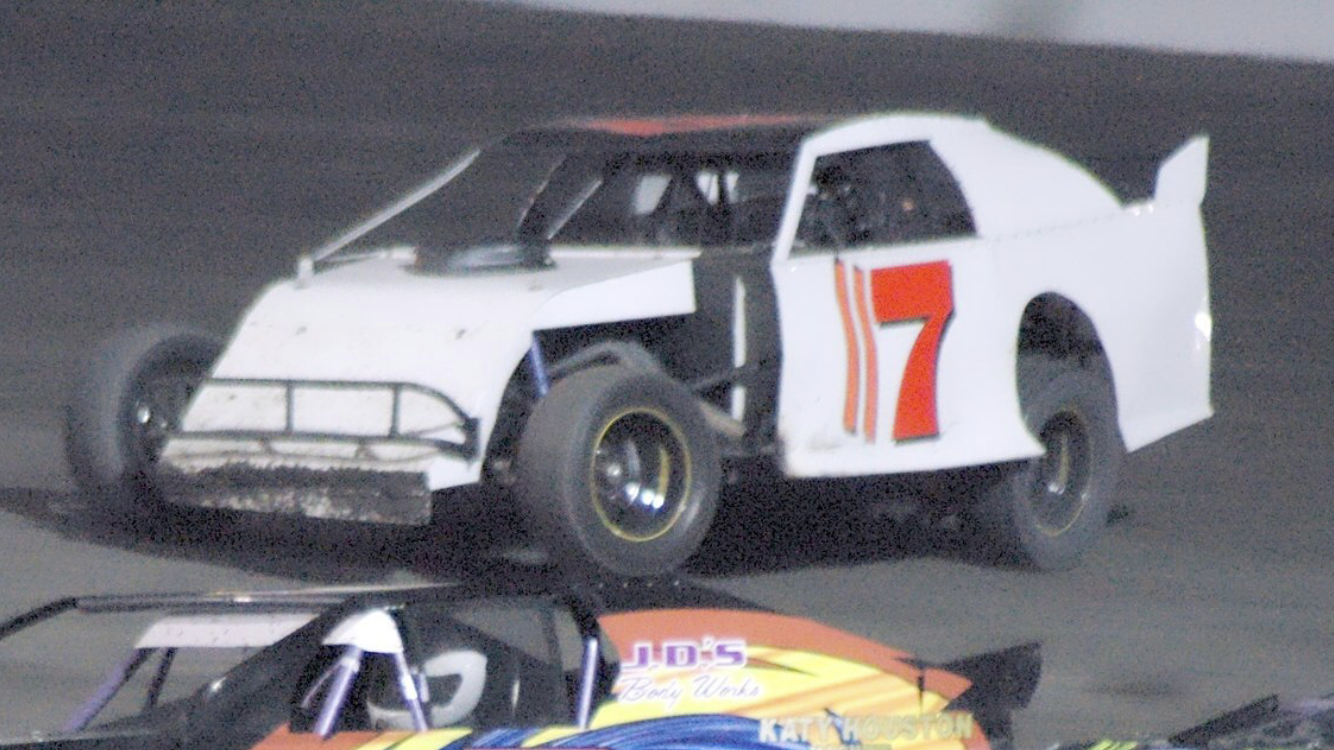
Brennan Poole in a UMP modified at Houston Raceway Park in 2008

Houston Raceway Park, formerly known as Royal Purple Raceway, was a quarter-mile dragstrip in Baytown, Texas, just outside Houston.

== History ==
Built in 1988, the Park is situated on 500 acres on the eastern edge of the greater Houston metropolitan area and is Houston's only major multi-purpose motorsports venue. The dragstrip has a three-story tower building that incorporates 23 VIP suites, a media center and race control facilities equipped with timing and scoring equipment. In 2000, Houston Raceway Park opened a new high banked 3/8 mile dirt oval at the facility.

Houston Raceway Park had an exclusive contract with the National Hot Rod Association to host an NHRA National Event within a 200-mile radius of the Houston metropolitan area. The event was renamed the NHRA Spring Nationals for the 2002 season.

On July 14, 2021, Houston Raceway Park and the NHRA announced that the facility will permanently be closing after the 2022 NHRA SpringNationals event. It was held April 22-24, 2022. The property will become part of a business expansion project for the adjacent international logistics service provider and port operator Katoen Natie.

== Capacity ==
Houston Raceway Park's paved pit area holds approximately 400 racing rigs, with additional pit parking available on grass. The spectator parking lots have a capacity of over 10,000 cars, along with a special VIP parking area capable of holding an additional 600 vehicles.

The Park has a seating capacity of 30,000 with additional grandstand seating brought in during major events to accommodate reserved seat requests. Houston Raceway Park has permanent rest room facilities and concession buildings, located near spectator seating on both sides of the race track.

== See also ==
- Galveston Bay Area
