= AMC Ambassador =

Large-sized cars produced by American Motors Corporation

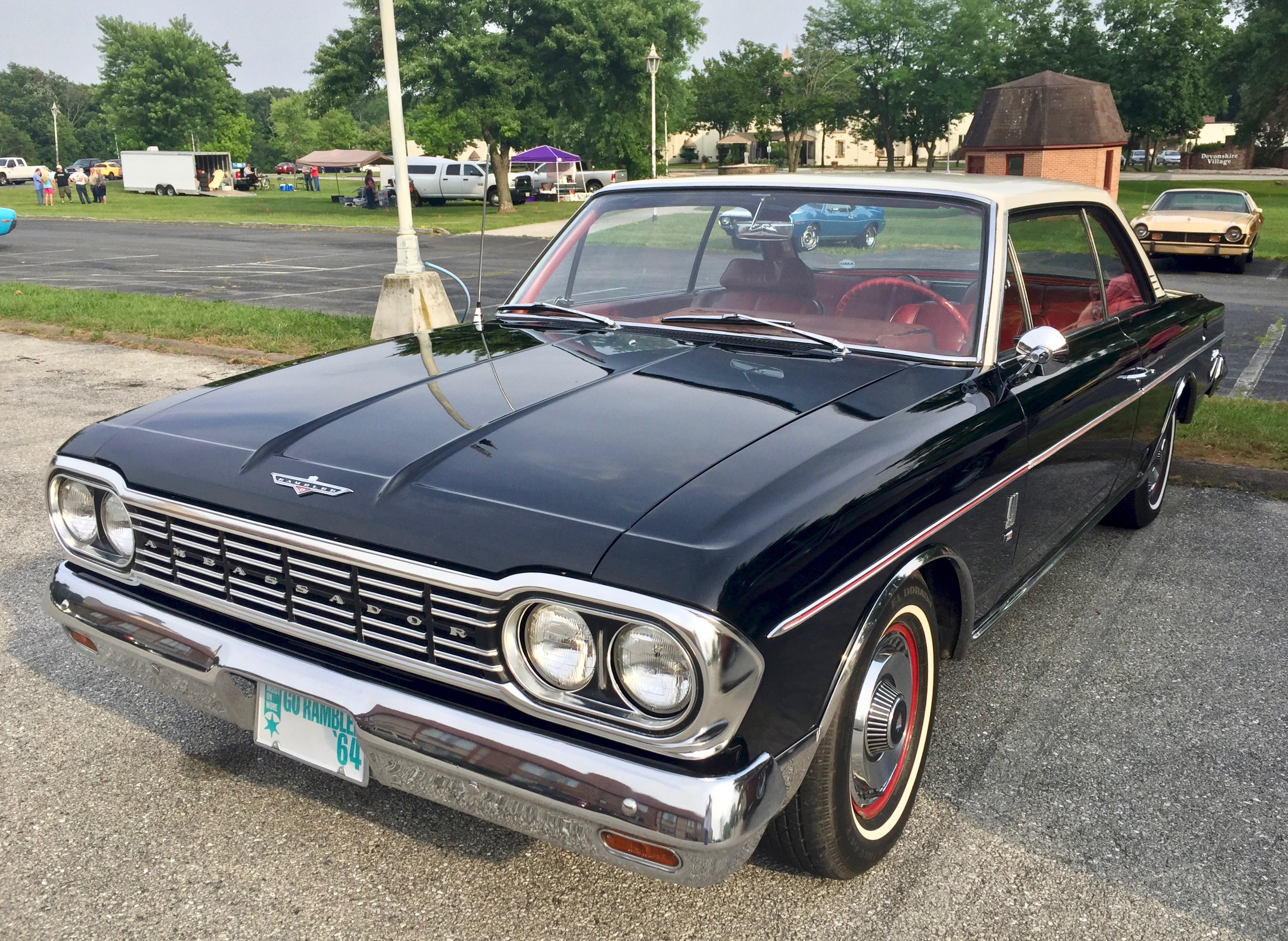
- 1964 Rambler Ambassador 990-H

Overview
- Manufacturer: American Motors Corporation (AMC)
- Also called: Ambassador by Rambler; American Motors Ambassador; Rambler Ambassador; IKA Ambassador
- Production: 1957–1974
- Model years: 1958–1974
- Assembly: Kenosha Factory, U.S.; Port Melbourne, Australia (AMI); Córdoba, Argentina (IKA); Brampton Assembly, Canada; San José, Costa Rica (ECASA); Monterrey, Mexico (Planta REO)

Body and chassis
- Class: Mid-size/Full-size
- Layout: FR layout

Chronology
- Predecessor: Nash Ambassador; Nash Statesman; Hudson Hornet; Hudson Wasp
- Successor: AMC Matador

The Ambassador is an automobile manufactured and marketed by American Motors Corporation (AMC) from model year 1957 through 1974. Over its eight generations, Ambassadors were available in two- and four-door sedans, two- and four-door hardtops, four-door station wagons, and two-door convertibles. The cars were classified as a full-size car from 1957 through 1961, a mid-size from 1962 until 1966, and again as a full-size car from 1967 through 1974. The Ambassador was positioned at the top as the flagship line for the automaker, featuring more standard equipment, higher levels of trim, or increased size.

When discontinued, the Ambassador nameplate was in use from 1927 until 1974, making it the longest continuously used car nameplate until then. Initially referring to a top trim level between 1927 and 1931, Nash used the Ambassador nameplate for their premium models. After merging with Hudson to form AMC, the nameplate was first used as the Ambassador V-8 by Rambler, then as the Rambler Ambassador, and finally as the AMC Ambassador.

Ambassadors were manufactured at AMC's Lake Front plant in Kenosha, Wisconsin, until 1974, and at AMC's Brampton Assembly in Ontario, Canada, between 1963 and 1966. Australian Motor Industries (AMI) assembled Ambassadors from knock-down kits with right-hand drive from 1961 until 1963. The U.S. fifth-generation Ambassadors were manufactured by Industrias Kaiser Argentina (IKA) in Córdoba, Argentina, from 1965 until 1972, and assembled by ECASA in Costa Rica from 1965 through 1970. Planta REO assembled the first-generation Ambassadors in Mexico at its Monterrey, Nuevo León plant. Fifth- and seventh-generation Ambassadors were modified into custom stretch limousines in Argentina and the U.S.

== Background ==
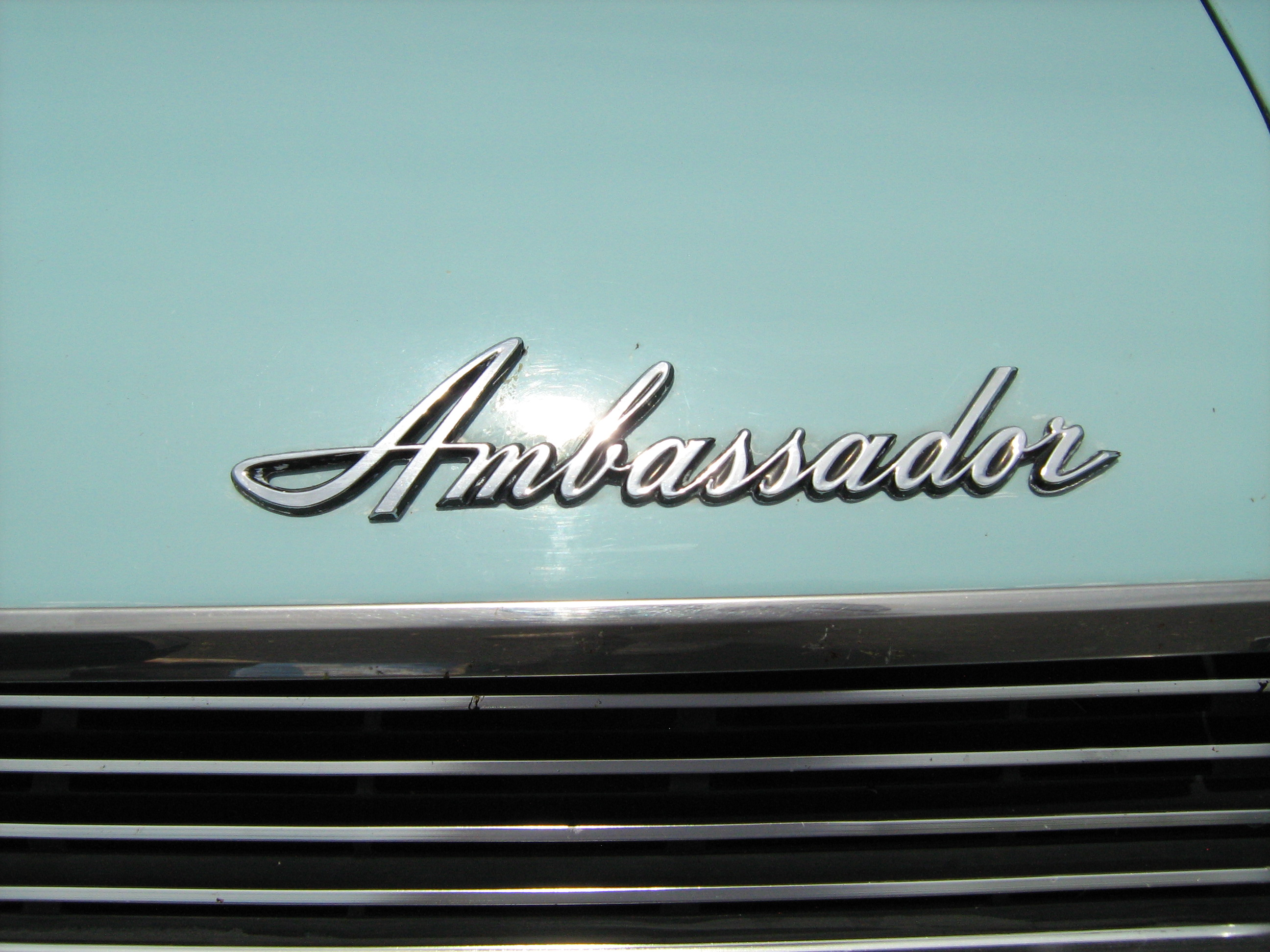
Ambassador emblem (1958–1961) and name badge (1967–1973)

The Ambassador nameplate, boasting one of the longest continuous runs in American automotive history, originated with Nash Motors in the late 1920s. and was a consistent symbol of luxury, prestige, and advanced engineering for decades.

=== Origins with Nash Motors ===
The first application of the Ambassador name by Nash Motors occurred during the 1927 model year. Initially, it was introduced not as a standalone model, but as a high-trim designation for a specially appointed four-door, five-passenger sedan. This established the Ambassador as a top-tier offering, signifying a heightened level of equipment, comfort, and refinement within Nash's burgeoning lineup.

By 1932, the Ambassador nameplate had evolved into its distinct model range and its position as the flagship and top-of-the-line offering in the Nash lineup. Throughout the pre-war years, the Nash Ambassador became renowned for its lavish equipment, robust construction, and high quality, earning it the nickname of "the Kenosha Duesenberg" — a nod to its Wisconsin manufacturing home and the car's opulent nature. Competition for the Ambassador during the 1930s included Packard, Lincoln, and the Duesenberg. These are "Approved Classics" by the Classic Car Club of America (CCCA).

The nameplate was later applied to the marque's top-of-the-line models, symbolizing prestige and advanced engineering. The Ambassador served as a platform for technological advancements, such as unibody construction (as Nash termed it, "Unitized Body"), and it was among the first popular domestic automobiles to feature this advanced structural design, laying the crucial groundwork for modern automotive engineering. Following World War II, the Ambassador continued as Nash's premier offering, undergoing significant redesigns, including the distinctive aerodynamic "Airflyte" styling. The Nash Ambassador was first with standard stacked quad headlamps. At the time, a design that violated some state laws regarding headlights, but a feature that later became popular on many cars. After the 1954 merger of Nash-Kelvinator and Hudson Motors to form American Motors Corporation, the Nash Ambassador continued to be produced under the Nash brand and dealer system, maintaining its identity within the newly formed company.

=== Reorientation under AMC ===
The unexpected death of AMC's visionary founder and CEO, George W. Mason, in October 1954, marked a pivotal transition for the nascent corporation. George Romney, whom Mason had been grooming as his successor, ascended to president and CEO. He inherited a company facing stiff competition from the domestic "Big Three" (General Motors, Ford, and Chrysler). Romney recognized that success in the postwar marketplace demanded substantial sales volumes to amortize the prohibitively high vehicle tooling and production costs. He declared that "competing with the 'Big Three' was the road to disaster" and that "the only way to compete against Detroit's Big Three was to beat them at their own game.".

Romney's primary strategic pivot was to concentrate AMC's efforts on the compact-car market segment, with its highly successful Rambler models. This segment was a strategic niche where the dominant domestic automakers had not yet introduced dedicated compact offerings, giving AMC a crucial competitive advantage. Despite this new focus, the Nash Ambassador, a legacy of the pre-merger Nash Motors, continued to be marketed under the new corporate umbrella for a transition from 1954 through 1957.

The 1954 Nash Ambassador models were largely carryovers from their 1953 predecessors, maintaining the distinctive "Airflyte" styling. An innovation was the first American automobile to feature a front-end, fully integrated heating, ventilating, and air-conditioning system. The marketplace in 1954 was dominated by an intense sales war between Ford and General Motors, which impacted the business of independent automakers like Hudson, Kaiser, Nash, Packard, and Studebaker. Ford and Chevrolet aggressively pushed their standard-size models to dealers, often with deep discounts, leading to declining sales for the independents. The newly formed AMC saw its compact-sized Rambler models (sold by Nash and Hudson dealers) grow while those of the Ambassador declined, with 21,428 built in 1954.

The 1955 model year Ambassadors included a facelift under the direction of Edmund E. Anderson that featured wrap-around windshields and a new oval grille with integrated headlights. New front fenders now had wheel arches to expose more of the front wheels and tires. For the first time, the Ambassadors were available with a V8 engine supplied by Packard and Packard's Ultramatic automatic transmission.

The Ambassador models underwent a significant restyle for 1956. A "V-line" theme adorned the cars, featuring a variety of two- and three-tone color schemes. The Ambassador lineup was streamlined, offering Nash I6 and a larger V8 engine from Packard. However, AMC introduced its in-house developed 250 cu in (4.1 L) V8 engine in April 1956. The 1957 Nash Ambassador models included numerous features and were notable for being among the first cars equipped with "quad" headlights as standard equipment. These were distinctively stacked vertically within the front fender "pontoons". The standard engine for the 1957 Ambassador was AMC's own V8, a modern overhead valve design displacing 327 cu in (5.4 L).

While Romney championed the compact car strategy, developing a redesigned 1958 Nash Ambassador based on a stretched and re-skinned 1956 Rambler body was underway. Designers at AMC also crafted a re-trimmed Hudson equivalent, tentatively named the "Rebel," intended for Hudson dealers. However, Romney made a difficult but decisive choice as sales of the traditional large-sized Ambassador and Hudson Hornet models continued declining. Romney essentially "represented a rejection of the standard way of running a U.S. automaker". In 1956, he determined that consumer confidence in these historic Nash and Hudson nameplates had waned beyond recovery. The decision to discontinue two iconic brands came so late that some early promotional materials for the forthcoming 1958 Ambassador even had the Nash and Hudson names airbrushed out.

After producing fewer than 3,600 large-sized Nash cars in 1957, the final Nash Ambassador rolled off the Kenosha, Wisconsin, production line on 25 June 1957. This marked the end of the Nash brand, as Romney, believing both Nash and Hudson were no longer relevant, retired both names to focus AMC's resources entirely on the successful Rambler line, which was officially registered as a separate marque for 1957.

== First generation (1958–1959) ==
First generation
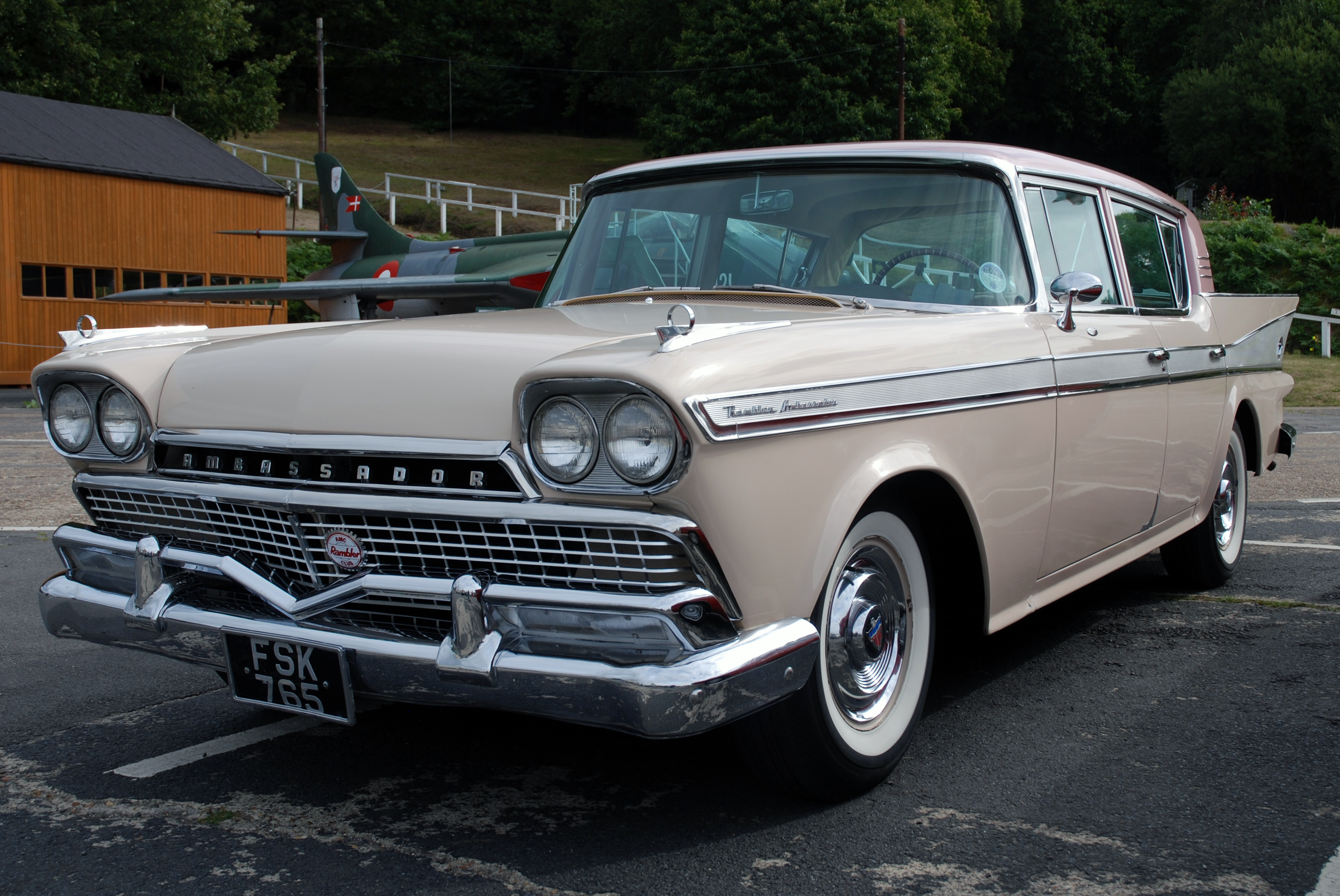
- 1958 Ambassador V8, Custom sedan

Overview
- Also called: Ambassador V8 by Rambler
- Model years: 1958–1959

Body and chassis
- Body style: 4-door sedan; 4-door hardtop sedan; 4-door station wagon; 4-door hardtop station wagon

Powertrain
- Engine: 327 cu in (5.4 L) V8
- Transmission: 3-speed automatic

Dimensions
- Wheelbase: 117 in (2,972 mm)

=== 1958 ===
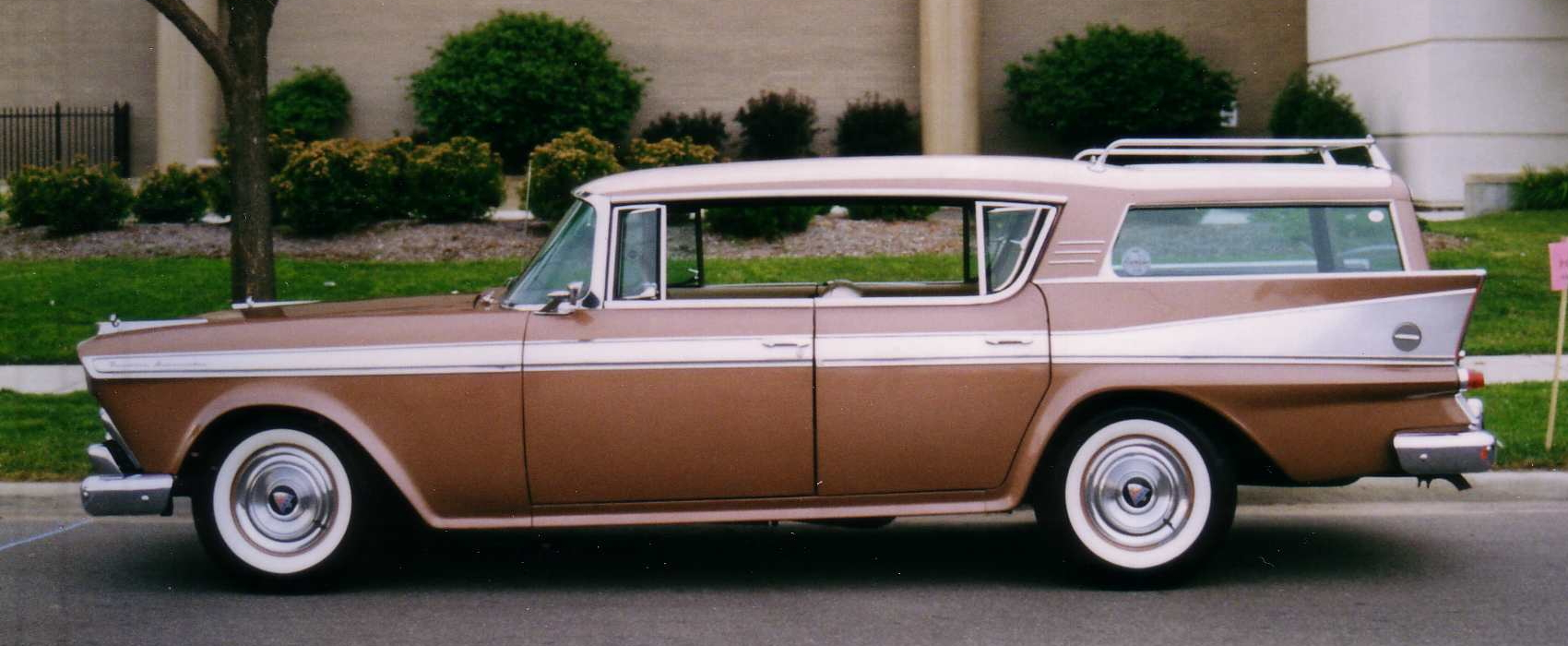
1958 AMC Ambassador hardtop (pillarless) Cross Country station wagon

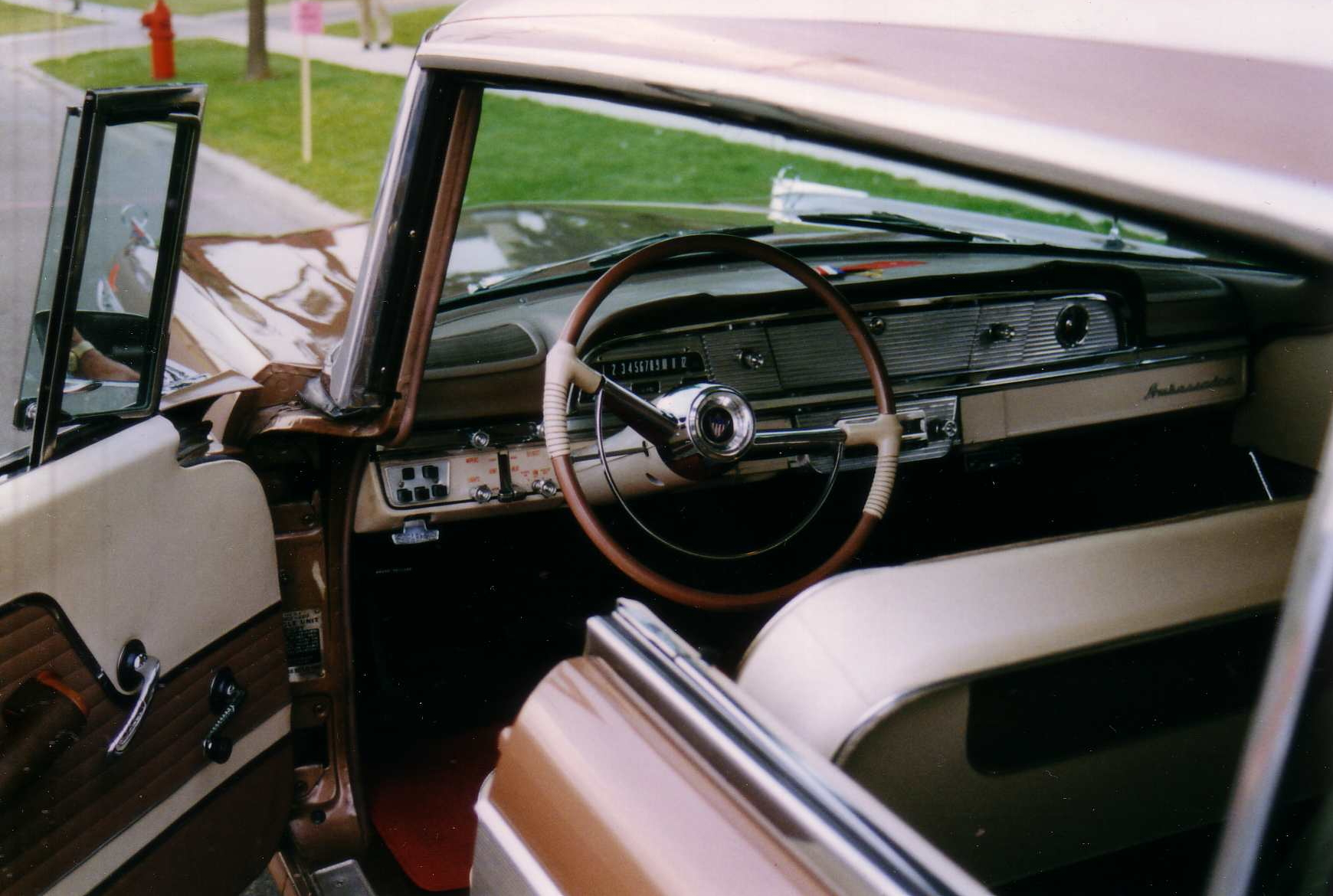
Ambassador Cross Country station wagon interior

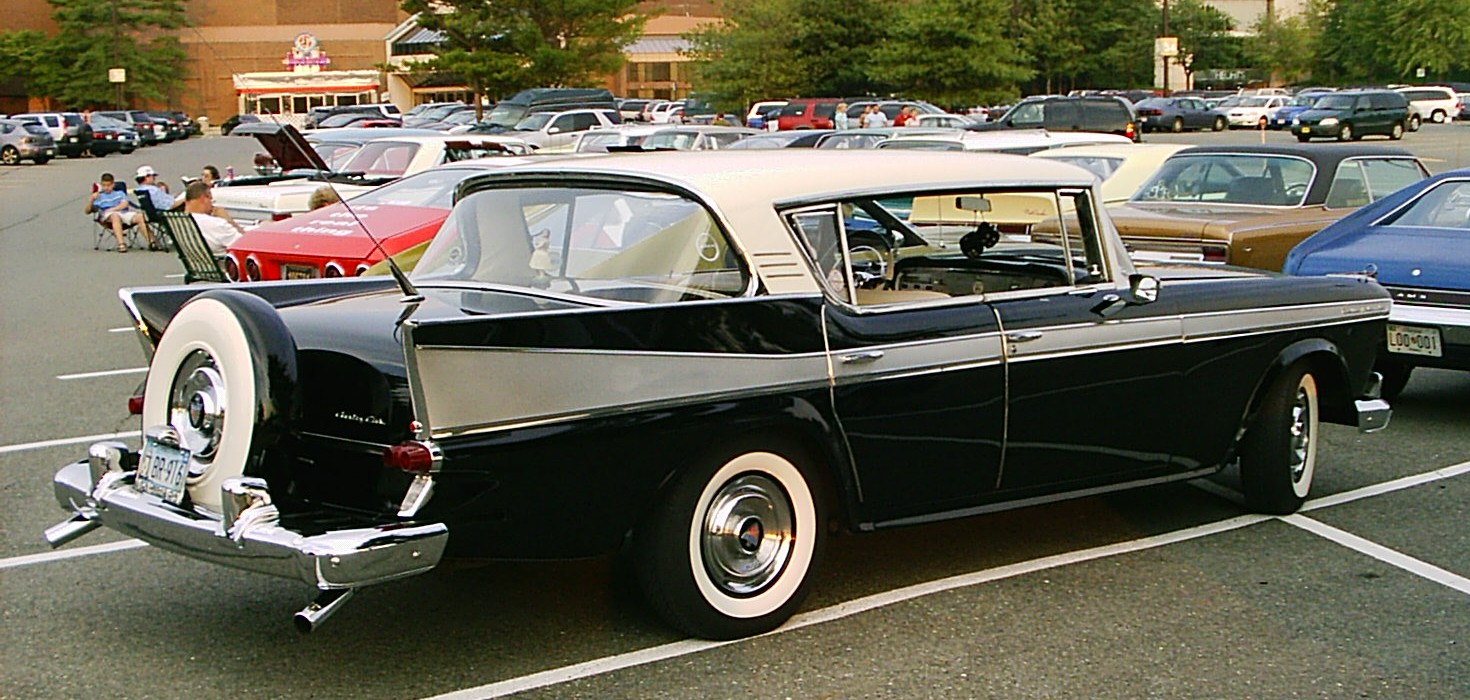
1958 Ambassador Custom hardtop sedan with continental tire

The 1958 Ambassador became a "full-size" compact car in the Rambler model line. This was a change from the plans to produce a stretched 117-inch (2,972 mm) wheelbase version of the Rambler platform for Nash dealers to be the new Nash Ambassador and another version for Hudson dealers. During September 1957, just before committing to the production of the new long-wheelbase versions of the Hudson and the Nash, CEO Romney dropped the Nash and Hudson marques.

With the legacy brands of the predecessor automakers canceled, work on a replacement large car continued, and on 8 October 1957, AMC introduced the 1958 "Ambassador V-8 by Rambler" on a 117-inch (2,972 mm) wheelbase. The body received a total reskinning with "surfaces stretched taut over an unabashedly square-rigged framework" removing any traces of the previous, Nash derived, roundness or "tubbiness". Its features included the new 327 cu in (5.4 L) AMC V8 engine mated to a BorgWarner supplied three-speed automatic transmission with push-button gear selection on the dashboard. The engine featured a four-barrel carburetor and dual exhausts. This was the hydraulic lifter version of AMC's 327 V8 rated at 270 hp (201 kW; 274 PS) and 360 lb⋅ft (488 N⋅m) of torque.

Management had found that the public associated the Rambler name with small economy cars and did not want the upscale nature of the new Ambassador to be so closely associated with Rambler's favorable, but economical image. Therefore, a decision was made that the larger Ambassador would be marketed as the Ambassador V-8 by Rambler to identify it with the Rambler name's burgeoning success, but to indicate an air of exclusivity by showing it to be a different kind of vehicle. However, the car wore "Rambler Ambassador" badges on its front fenders.

Ambassador body styles for 1958 included a four-door sedan and a hardtop sedan, a four-door pillared station wagon, and a pillarless Cross Country station wagon. This wagon body style was an industry first in the 1956 Nash and Hudson Rambler line, on which all the 1958 Ramblers were based.

Model identification was located on the car's front fenders and deck lid. Super trim level Ambassadors featured painted side trim that complemented the body color; Custom models featured a silver anodized aluminum panel on sedans and vinyl woodgrain decals on station wagons. The 1958 Ambassador came equipped with such luxury items as an electric clock, twin front and rear ashtrays, Nash's traditional "deep coil" spring suspension front and rear, split-back reclining front seats that fold down into a bed, as well as upscale fabrics for the interior. Numerous safety features (such as deep-dished steering wheels and padded dashboards) came standard, while lap seat belts were optional.

The 1958 Ambassador is substantially longer than the 108-inch (2,743 mm) wheelbase Rambler Six and Rebel V8. However, both lines shared the same basic body, styling, and visual cues. However, the Ambassador's extra nine inches (230 mm) of wheelbase (and, therefore, overall length) were added ahead of the cowl, meaning the passenger compartment had the same volume as the smaller Ramblers. The Ambassadors came with plusher interior and exterior trims, while the front end incorporated the Rebel "V-Line" grille from the prototype Hudson model. Through effective market segmentation, the Ambassador was positioned to compete with the larger models offered by other automakers.

American Motors first produced its V8 in 1956, a modern overhead valve engine displacing 250 cu in (4.1 L), with a 3.25-inch stroke, forged steel crankshaft, which when equipped with a 4-barrel carburetor, was rated at 215 hp (160 kW; 218 PS). For 1957, AMC bored the 3 1/2-inch 250 CID V8 to 4 inches and 327 cu in (5.4 L) displacement, which, when offered in the Rambler Rebel used solid lifters and Bendix electronic fuel injection, was rated at 288 hp (215 kW; 292 PS). Although AMC's 327 CID V8 shares its displacement with the Chevrolet small-block, AMC's 327 came out five years before Chevrolet offered its 327 V8.

The Ambassador had an excellent power-to-weight ratio for its time and provided spirited performance with 0 to 60 mph (0 to 97 km/h) times of less than 10 seconds, with low 17-second times through a quarter-mile (402 m) dragstrip. It could be equipped with a limited-slip differential, as well as power brakes, power steering, power windows, and air conditioning. "The Ambassador was Rambler's economy flagship, and road testers liked the speed, room, luxury features, and engineering integrity".

The new positioning of the Rambler brand in a larger car line with added features resulted in sales of 14,570 Ambassadors for 1958. The new model was positioned in the mid-priced class alongside Pontiac and Mercury. The interiors were nicely appointed interiors and the Ambassador even featured the obligatory for the era tailfins. However, buyers in the mid-priced bracket were not drawn in large numbers to the bigger Rambler. The recession of 1958 saw a sharp worldwide economic downturn which made mid-model year reintroduction of the compact Nash Rambler, produced from 1950 through 1954, as the "new" 1958 Rambler American an unprecedented comeback and a sales success for AMC during a deteriorating marketplace.

=== 1959 ===
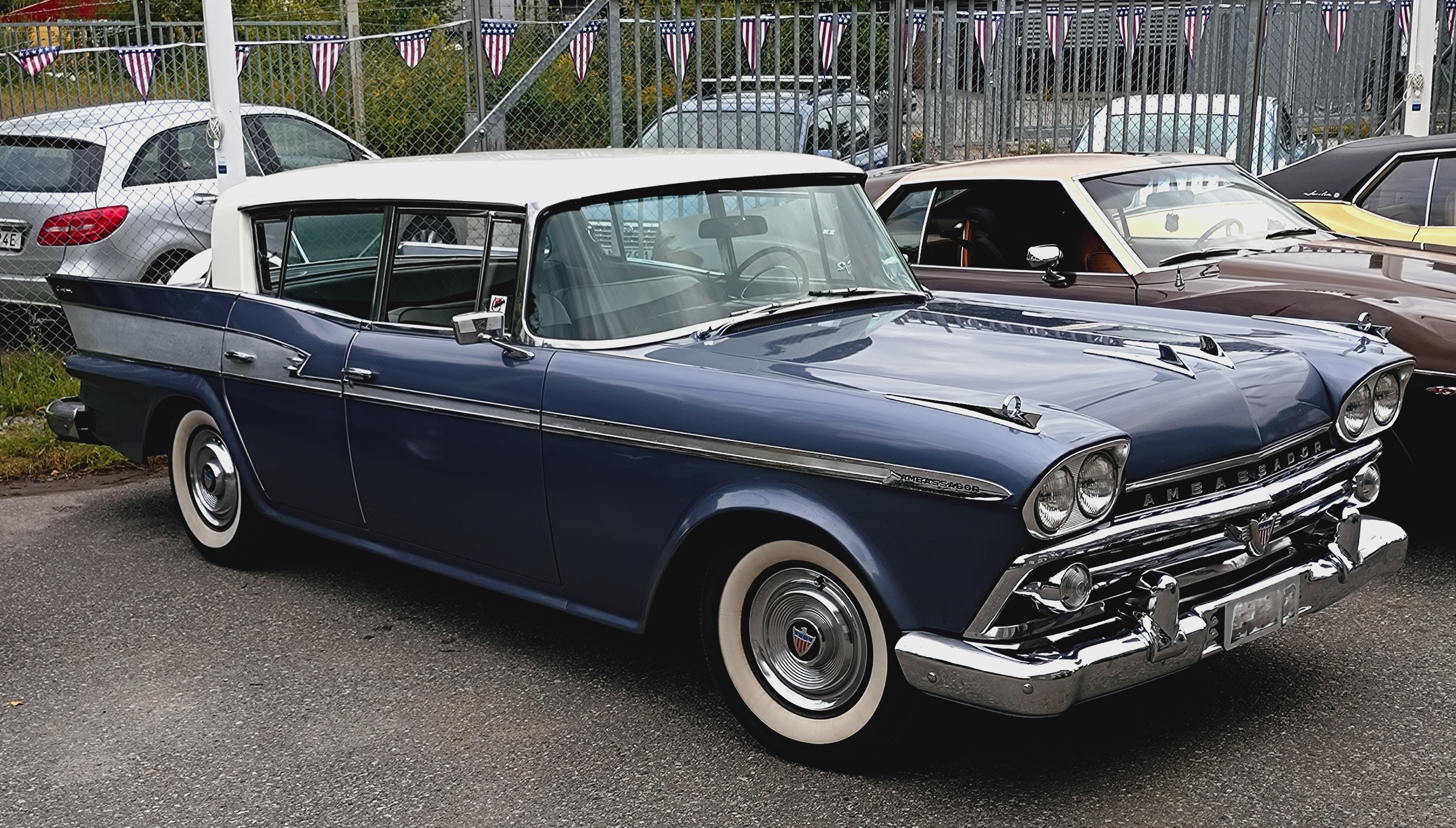
1959 Rambler Ambassador four-door hardtop

For 1959, the Ambassador received a revised grille, side trim, and redesigned rear door skins that swept into the tailfins instead of terminating at the C-pillar. Scotchlite reflectors were also added to the rear of the tailfins to increase visibility at night. Front and rear bumpers were over 20% thicker and featured recessed center sections to protect license plates. Adjustable headrests for the front seats were a new option, an industry first. AMC touted the added comfort the headrests provided, as well as their potential for reducing whiplash injuries in the event of a rear-end collision. Other changes included the activation of the starter through the neutral pushbutton (on automatic transmission-equipped cars) and the addition of an optional "Powr-Saver" engine fan, which featured a fluid-filled clutch for quieter high-speed operation.

The 1959 model year also saw the addition of an optional "Air-Coil Ride" air suspension system, utilizing airbags installed within the rear coil springs. An engine-driven compressor, reservoir, and ride-height control valve comprised the rest of the system. Still, as other automakers discovered, the troublesome nature of air suspension outweighed its benefits. The option proved unpopular and was discontinued at the end of the model year.

Ambassador sales improved considerably over 1958, reaching an output of 23,769; nearly half of which were Custom four-door sedans. Less popular was the hardtop station wagon, of which 578 were built.

== Second generation (1960–1961) ==
Second generation
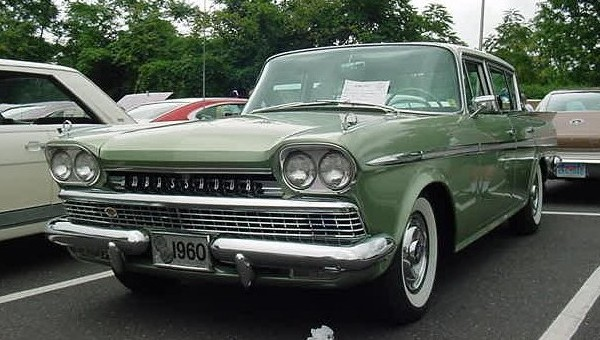
- 1960 Ambassador V8 by Rambler

Overview
- Also called: Rambler Ambassador
- Model years: 1960–1961

Body and chassis
- Body style: 4-door sedan; 4-door hardtop sedan; 4-door station wagon; 4-door hardtop station wagon

Powertrain
- Engine: 327 cu in (5.4 L) V8

Dimensions
- Wheelbase: 117 in (2,972 mm)

=== 1960 ===
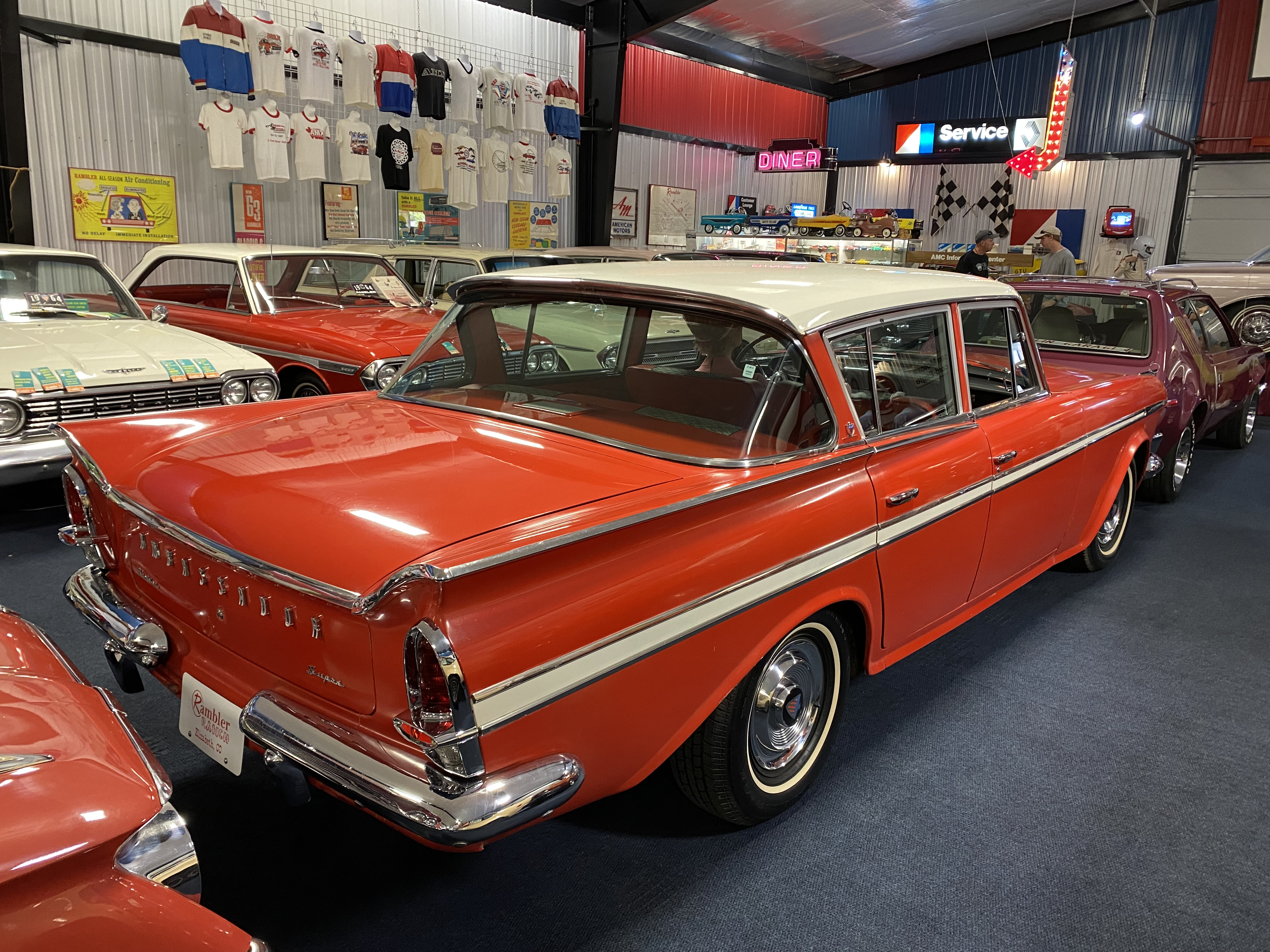
1960 Rambler Ambassador Super sedan

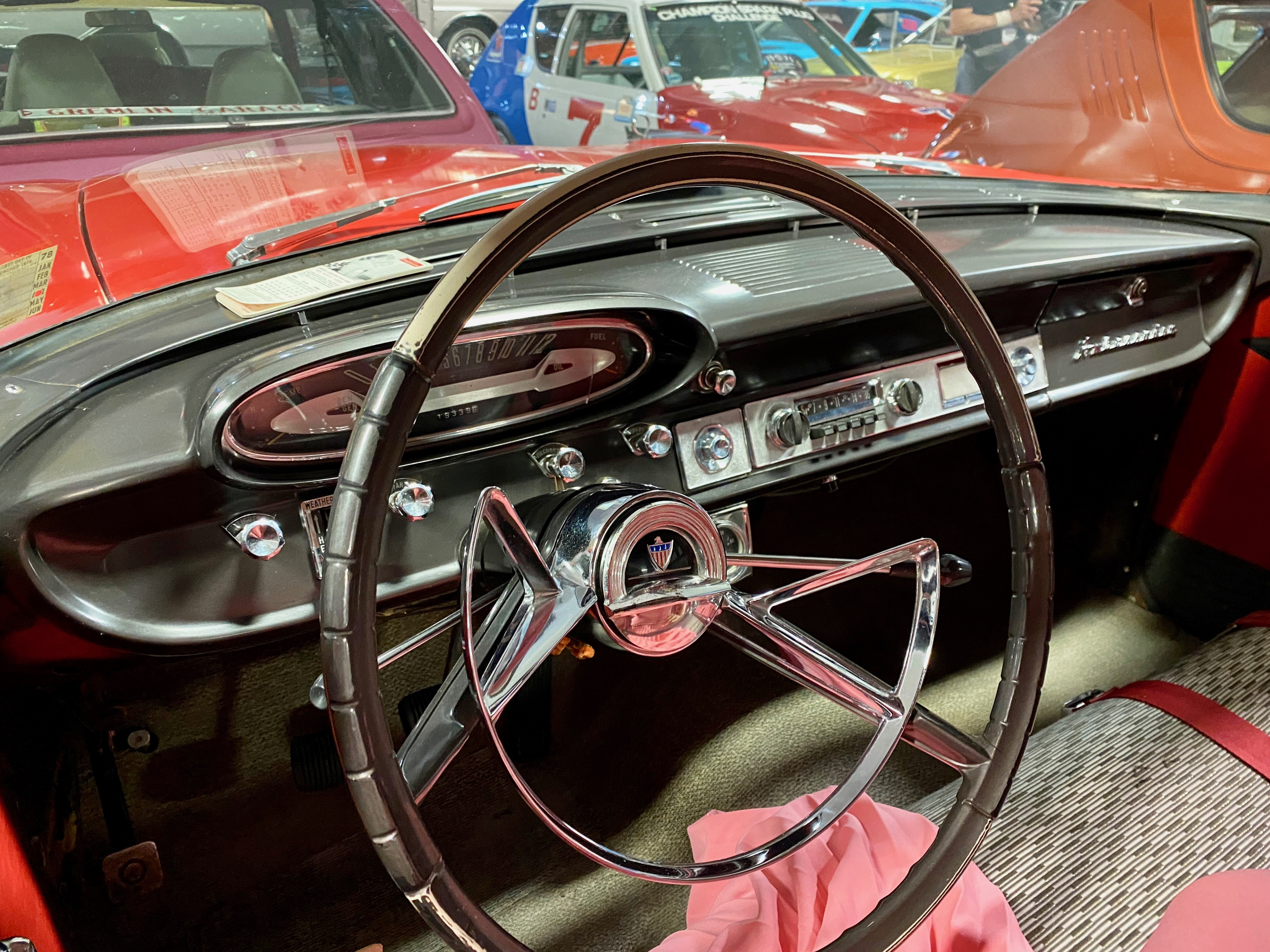
1960 Rambler Ambassador interior

The decision to discontinue the Nash and Hudson brands resulted in developing the second-generation Rambler Ambassador design. It was the only American midsize, luxury high-performance car offered in 1960. The "Ambassador by Rambler" was marketed by AMC as America's Compact Luxury Car.

The 1960 model year lineup was reskinned, using new fenders, hood, deck lid, door skins, roofline, grille, taillights, bumpers, windshield, and backlight. The lower hood line, lower windshield cowl, simplified side trims, and egg-crate grille with stand-up letters spelling AMBASSADOR were significant. At the same time, the tailfins were reduced in height and were canted to either side, making for an integrated appearance, and the AMBASSADOR name was repeated across the rear trunk lid. The overall effect was relatively fresh, as the new roof had a lower, lighter look to complement the lower fins and grille. The design changes and the new grille provided "a more expensive look".

The 1960 Ambassador was available only with four doors in sedan and station wagon body types. The station wagons had two rows of seats for six adult passengers or an additional rear-facing third row for an eight-passenger version. Additionally, a pillarless sedan (hardtop) and station wagon were available in the top-of-the-line "Custom" trim version. Three trim levels started with a "Deluxe" sedan reserved for fleet customers. The "Super" was the entry-level consumer version and available only as a pillared sedan and pillared six- or eight-passenger station wagon body styles. The top "Custom" trim models in both pillared or hardtop versions included fender ornaments, a clock, full wheel covers as well as additional padding for the rear seat, dash, and sun visors. To enhance the visual length of the cars, a full-length bodyside molding was painted in a contrasting color on the Super trim models or enclosed a brushed aluminum panel on the Ambassador Custom series.

Ambassadors now came with a unique compound curved windshield that cut into the roof. This improved visibility, did away with the "knee knocker" dogleg design of AMC's first-generation wrap-around windshield, and resulted in an even stiffer unitized structure. The 1960 Ambassador had a low cowl, providing excellent visibility with the compound windshield. All 1960 Ambassadors came with a new instrument cluster under a padded cowl and illuminated controls for lights, wipers, fan, and defrost functions. Additional conveniences included a spotlight on the accelerator pedal and a net above the padded sun visors to hold lightweight items. The top-of-the-line Ambassador Custom models came standard with individual "airliner" reclining front seats that now had even more luxurious fabrics than in previous years.

All Ambassadors included the AMC's 327 cu in (5.4 L) V8, but for the first time, it was available in two versions. First was the original 270 hp (201 kW; 274 PS), 360 lb⋅ft (490 N⋅m) of torque, performance version equipped with the 4-barrel carburetor and a 9.7:1 compression ratio, which required premium fuel, and a second economy version running on regular gasoline making 250 hp (186 kW), 340 lb⋅ft (460 N⋅m) of torque, equipped with a two-barrel carburetor and an 8.7:1 compression ratio. The 1960 Ambassadors continued with an independent front suspension with upper and lower A-arms, an enclosed drive shaft (torque tube) with a live rear axle using 4-link trailing arms, and coil springs at all four wheels. However, the suspension was revised, resulting in better handling.

Equipped with the 270 hp (201 kW; 274 PS) 327 cu in (5.4 L) V8 and the BorgWarner pushbutton-operated three-speed planetary gear and torque converter automatic transmission, the Ambassadors reached 60 miles per hour (97 km/h) in just over 9 seconds and passed the quarter-mile in 17 seconds. The Ambassadors featured soft springs and a solid build, making them ride silently and smoothly, according to reviewers.

The year set a new record for AMC, with total production reaching almost half a million cars and total revenue exceeding $1 billion. The Rambler Six and V8 along with the Rambler American represented almost 95% of AMC's automobile sales. A total of 23,798 Ambassadors were built for the 1960 model year, with the Custom sedan being the most popular body and trim version (10,949 units). Only 302 Deluxe (fleet) sedans were delivered.

=== 1961 ===
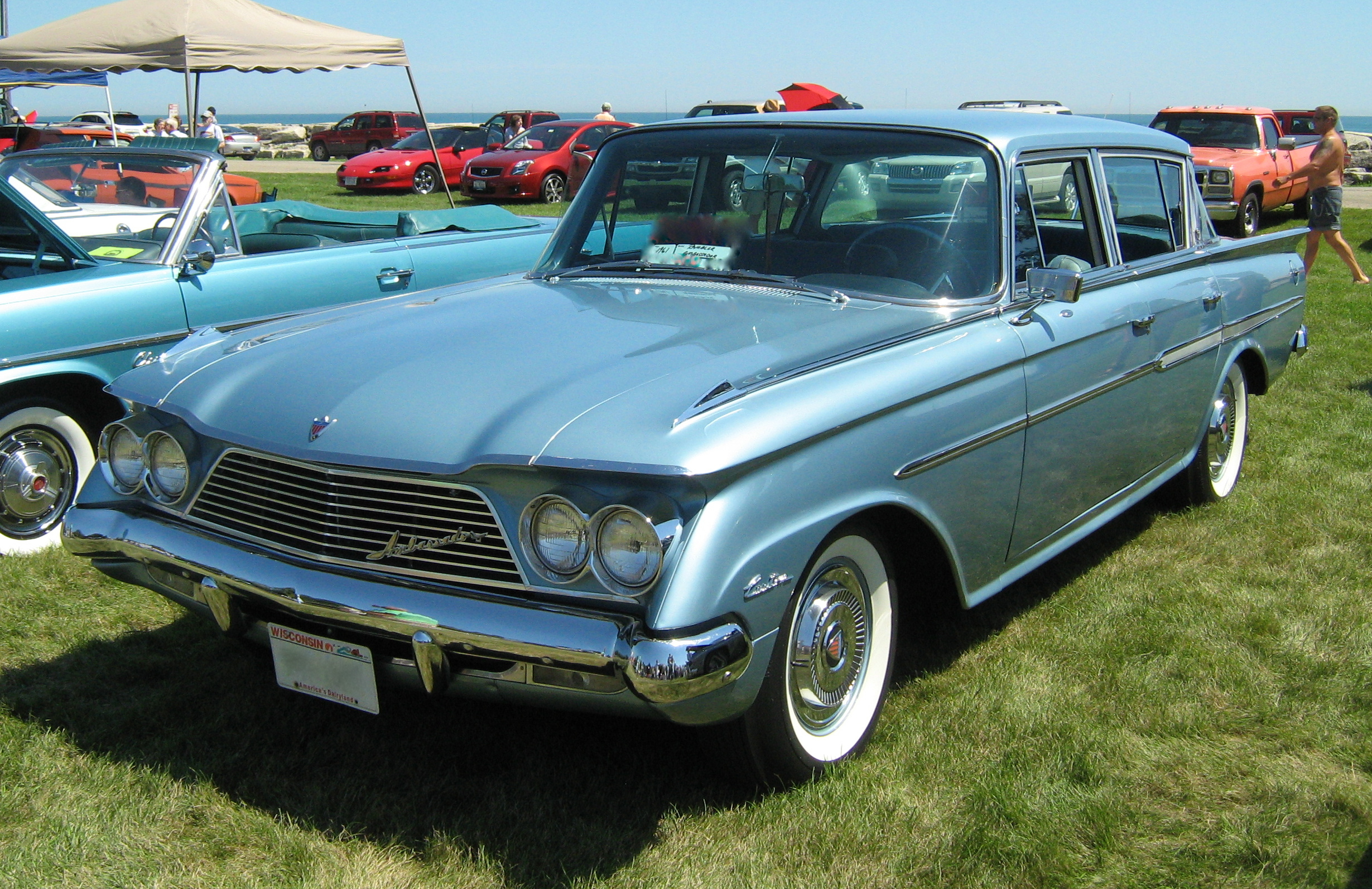
1961 Rambler Ambassador Custom

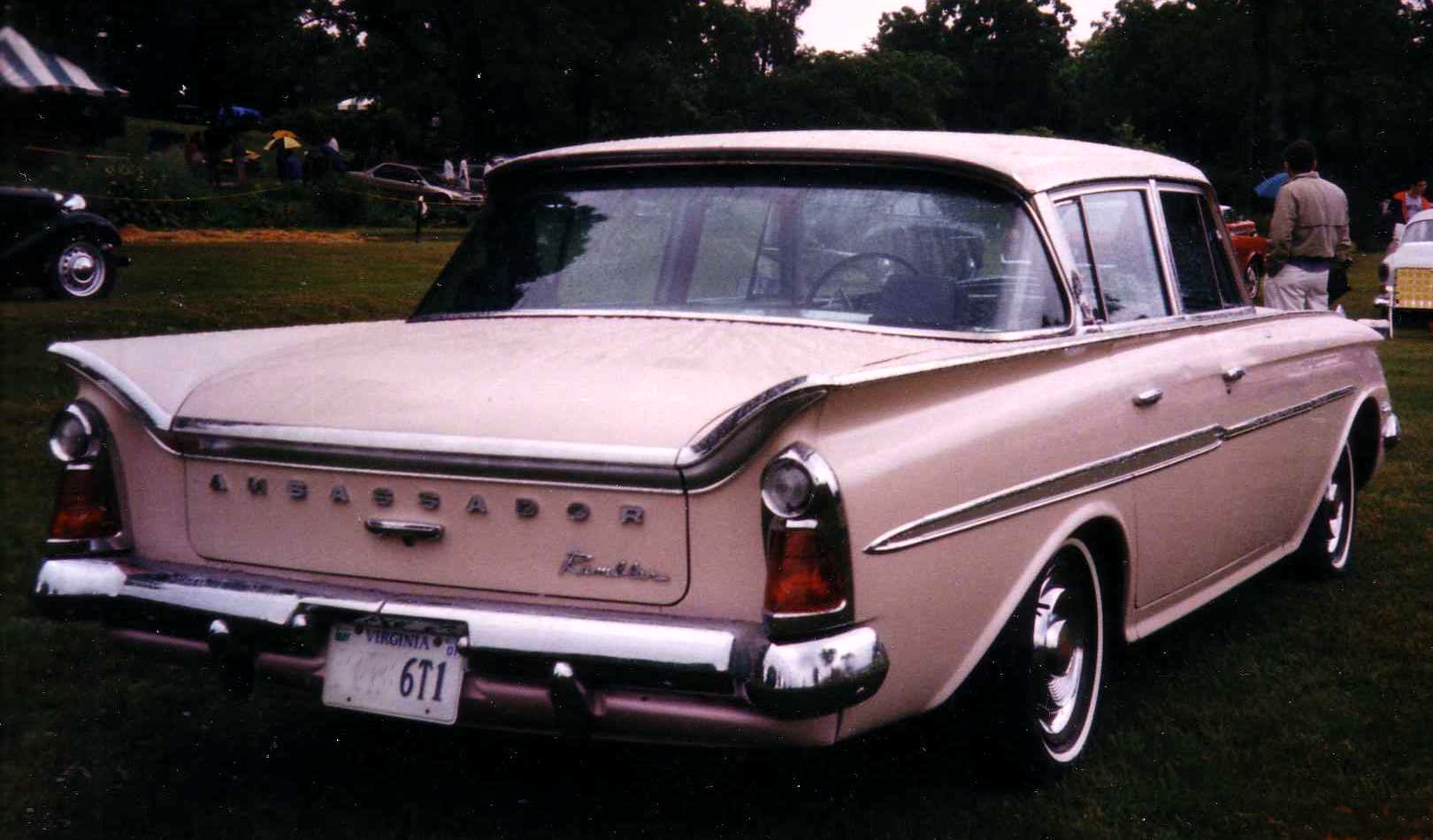
1961 Rambler Ambassador

The 1961 Ambassador continued the previous year's 117-inch (2,972 mm) primary unitized platform, but received an unusual new front-end styling that was overseen by AMC's in-house design department headed by Edmund E. Anderson. The pillar-less four-door hardtop sedan and station wagon models were no longer available for 1961.

The Ambassador's new design consisted of a trapezoid grille and headlights that floated in a body-colored panel. At the same time, the front fenders arched downward and forward of the leading edge of the hood. Unlike anything else on the market, AMC's marketing department promoted the look as "European". The interior featured a "space-age" inspired oval instrument pod, centrally located behind the slender, two-tone steering wheel. This evocative pod housed the speedometer flanked by temperature and fuel gauges, along with warning lamps, directional indicators, and the odometer, all encased in a dark-padded, color-matched enclosure. Other innovative elements included the "Handi-Pak Net Carrier" integrated into the fiberglass acoustical headliner as well as the "Airliner" reclining front seats with Airfoam cushions, capable of folding flat to form "Twin Travel Beds".

While the new look was meant to distinguish the Ambassador from the lower-priced Ramblers, it was neither a consumer success nor well received in the automotive press. Moreover, overall automobile industry sales fell as the entire U.S. economy was experiencing the recession of 1960–1961.

Standard was the 250 hp (186 kW; 253 PS) 327 cu in (5.4 L) V8 with a synchromesh manual transmission. Optional was the 270 hp (201 kW; 274 PS) "power pack" version with a dual exhaust system featuring new ceramic-coated mufflers guaranteed for the life of the car.

The 1961 Pure Oil Company Economy Trials, designed to parallel everyday driving experiences closely, saw the Ambassador capture 9 of the first ten places in the V8 engine category and win the top of its class.

== Third generation (1962) ==
Third generation
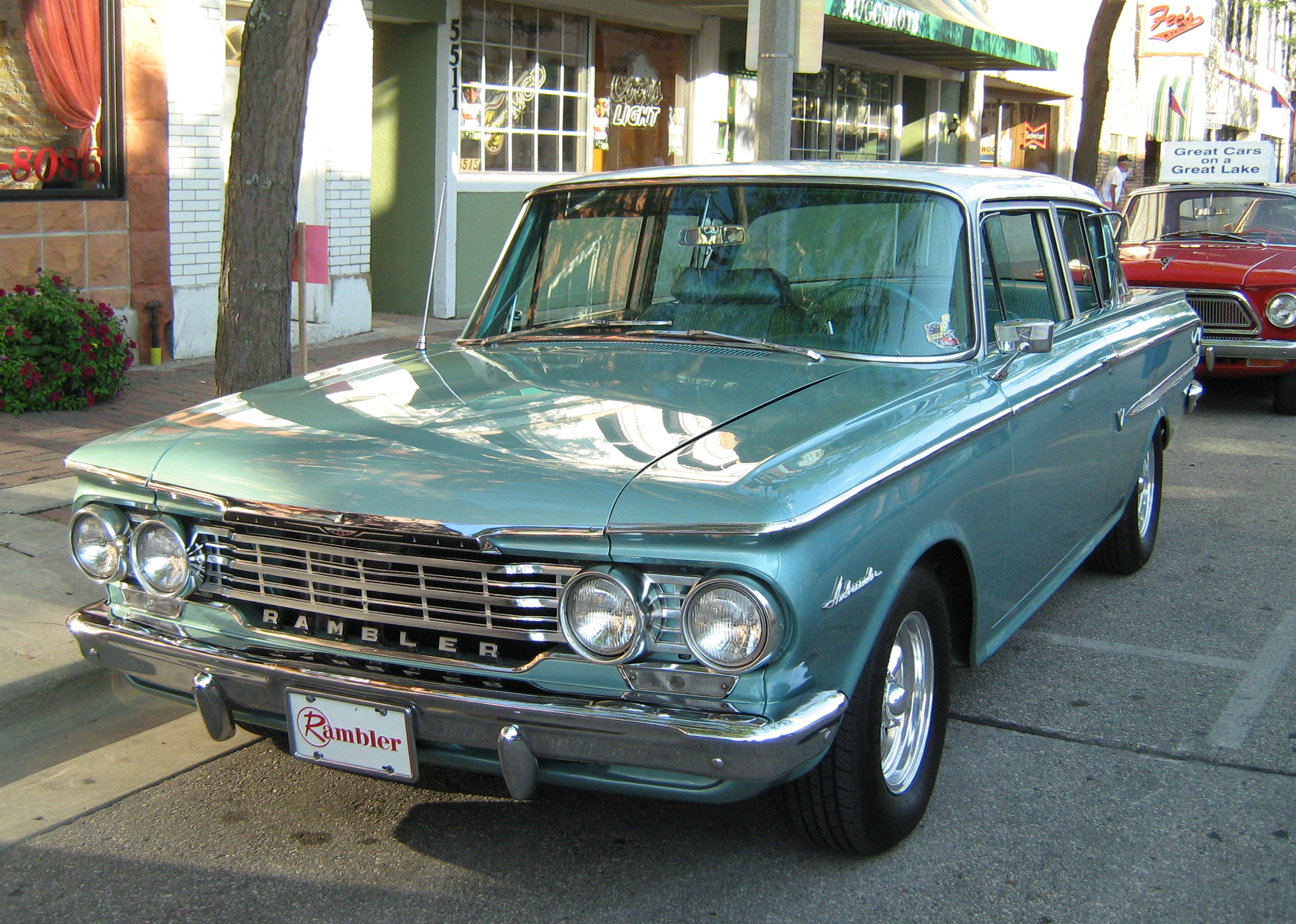
- 1962 Rambler Ambassador

Overview
- Also called: Rambler Ambassador
- Model years: 1962

Body and chassis
- Body style: 2-door sedan; 4-door sedan; 4-door station wagon

Powertrain
- Engine: 327 cu in (5.4 L) V8

Dimensions
- Wheelbase: 108 in (2,743 mm)

=== 1962 ===
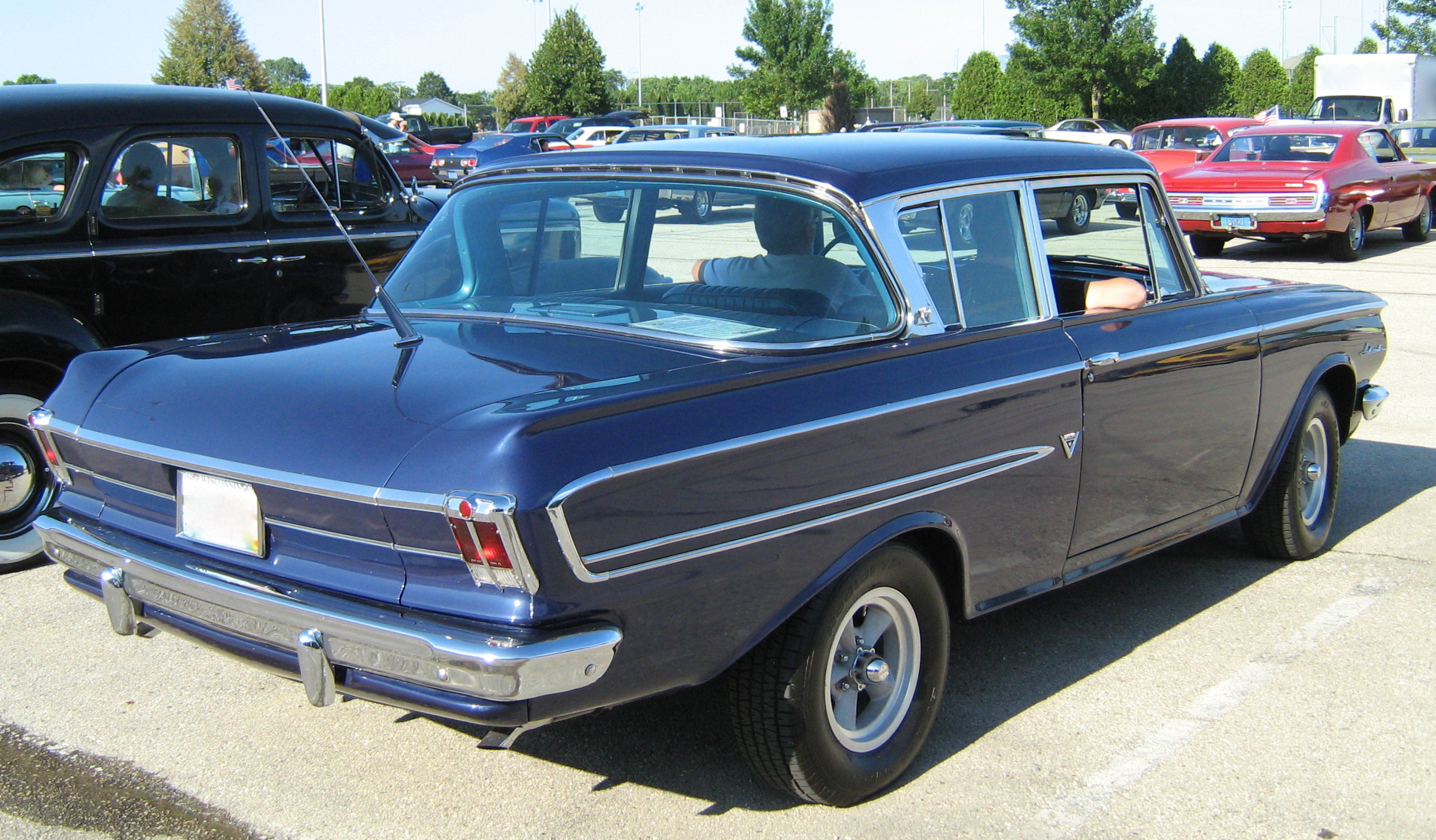
1962 Rambler Ambassador 2-door sedan rear

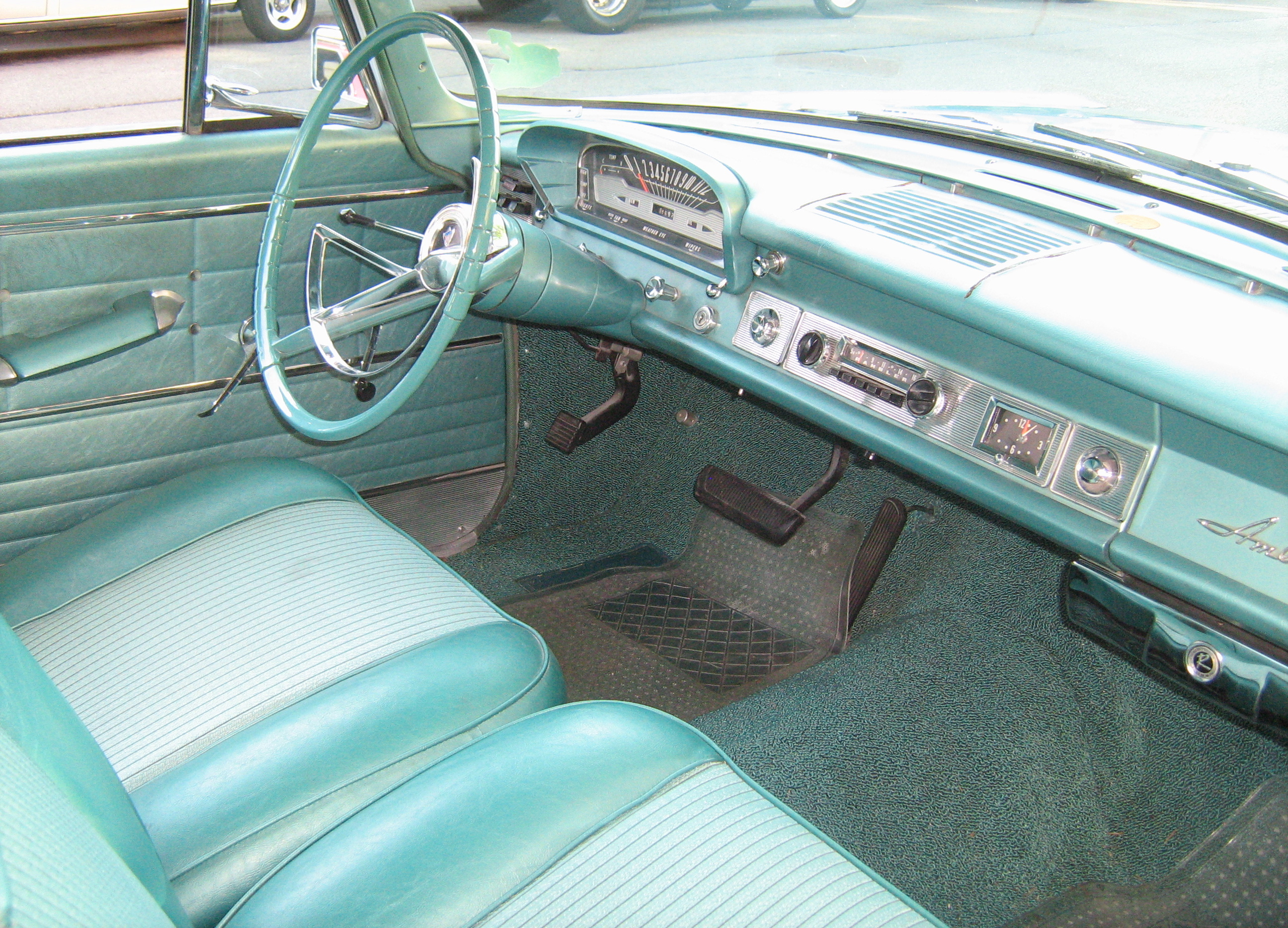
1962 Rambler Ambassador interior

By the 1962 model year, the Ambassador's platform was in its fifth season on the market. While Rambler sales had been good enough for third place in industry sales (behind Chevrolet and Ford), AMC's management was working on a revolutionary and somewhat costly design set to debut for the 1963 model year. In the meantime, American Motors needed to save money. Since the Ambassador's sales had fallen in 1961, it was decided that the car would be downsized for 1962 to directly share the body, windshield, and 108-inch (2,743 mm) wheelbase with the Classic platform. Accordingly, the car was marketed as a Rambler Ambassador.

All Ambassadors included AMC's 327 cu in (5.4 L) V8 engine, while the Rambler Classic models were limited to I6 engines. The standard V8 was available either the regular fuel, two-barrel carburetor with 8.7:1 compression ratio, 250 hp (186 kW; 253 PS) version or the premium gasoline, four-barrel version with 9.7:1 compression ratio producing 270 hp (201 kW; 274 PS). The 108-inch (2,743 mm) wheelbase 1962 Ambassador was lighter than its 117-inch (2,972 mm) wheelbase predecessors and was a spirited performer with the 270 hp (201 kW; 274 PS) 327 cu in (5.4 L) V8. This was like the 1957 Rambler Rebel, which was the quickest four-door sedan made in the United States that year, achieving 0 to 60 mph (0 to 97 km/h) acceleration in just over 7 seconds and making it faster than the Hemi Chrysler 300C, the DeSoto Adventurer, the Dodge D500, the Plymouth Fury, and the Chevrolet fuel-injected 283. The 1962 Ambassador was the same vehicle and should also reach 60 mph about as quickly as did the 1957 Rambler Rebel.

The 1962 Ambassador received a new front end similar to the 1961 and 1962 Classic's, but with a crosshatch design, recessed center section, and Ambassador lettering. New, rectangular taillights were seen at the ends of restyled rear fenders, which lost their fins entirely. The exterior trim was reshuffled, and a new two-door pillared sedan debuted. A new '400' trim line was added at the top of the trim series, with Super and Custom models remaining. The Ambassador offered even more luxurious interiors to differentiate it from the Rambler Classic. The 400 models were available with vinyl upholstered front bucket seats and headrests along with color-coordinated shag carpets.

The 1962 Ambassador came with a dual chamber master brake cylinder and dual-circuit brake system, thus separating the front and rear brakes so that in the event of the failure of one component, some braking function would remain. This design was offered by only a few cars at that time. The 1962 models were equipped with "Walker" (brand) flow-through mufflers and a ceramic-coated exhaust system.

Dealer-installed options included rear fender skirts and a tow hitch.

In 1962, George Romney was elected as the new governor of Michigan, and in February, Roy Abernethy, who was responsible for the increasing sales under Romney, became CEO of AMC. A total of 36,171 Rambler Ambassadors were built for 1962, and AMC dropped from third to fourth place in total U.S. industry sales for the year.

== Fourth generation (1963–1964) ==
Fourth generation
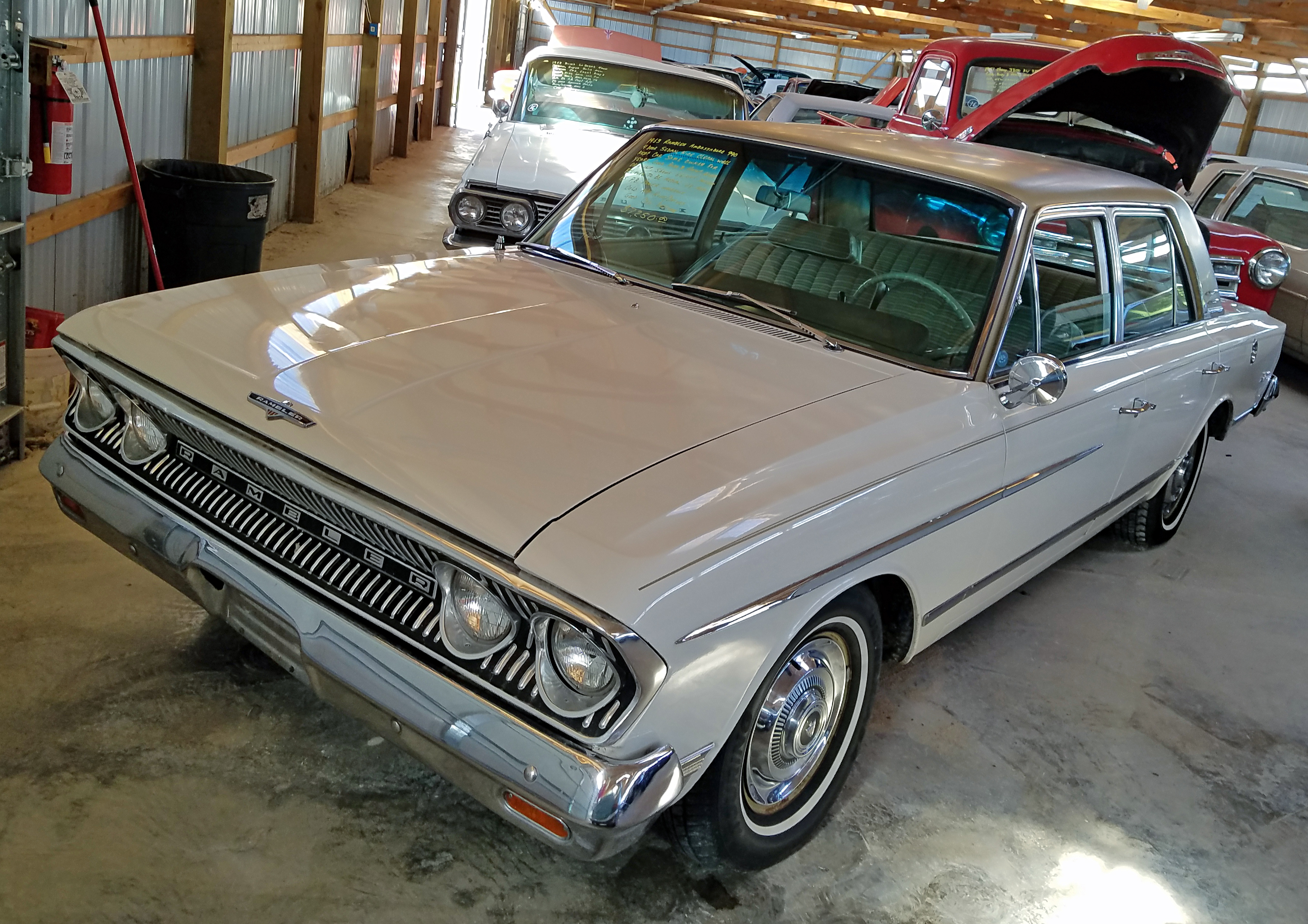
- 1963 Rambler Ambassador 990 Sedan

Overview
- Model years: 1963–1964

Body and chassis
- Body style: 2-door sedan (1963); 4-door sedan; 4-door station wagon; 2-door hardtop (1964)

Powertrain
- Engine: 327 cu in (5.4 L) V8

Dimensions
- Wheelbase: 112 in (2,845 mm)
- Length: 188.8 in (4,796 mm)
- Width: 71.3 in (1,811 mm)
- Height: 55.3 in (1,405 mm)

=== 1963 ===
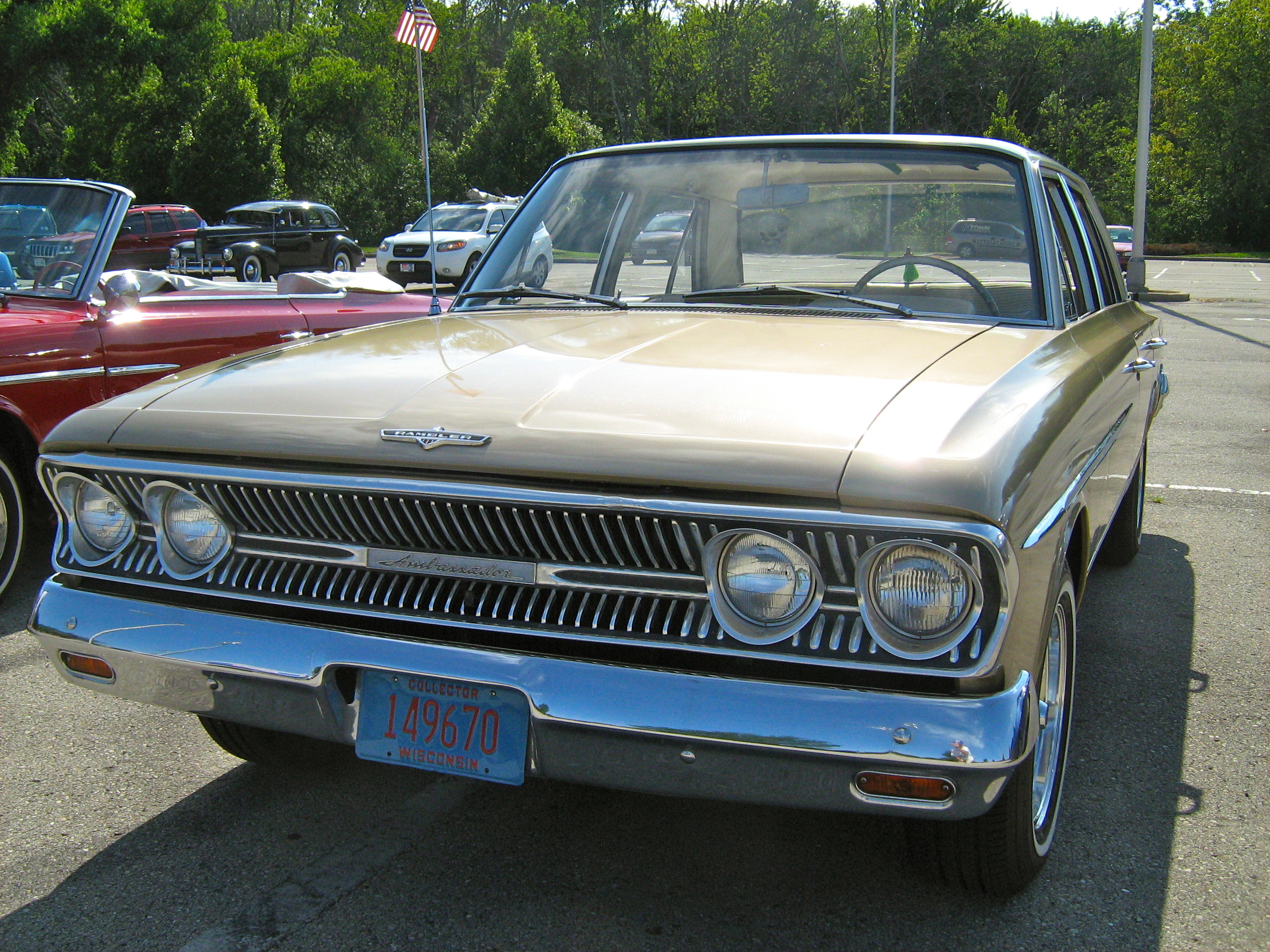
1963 Rambler Ambassador 880 Sedan

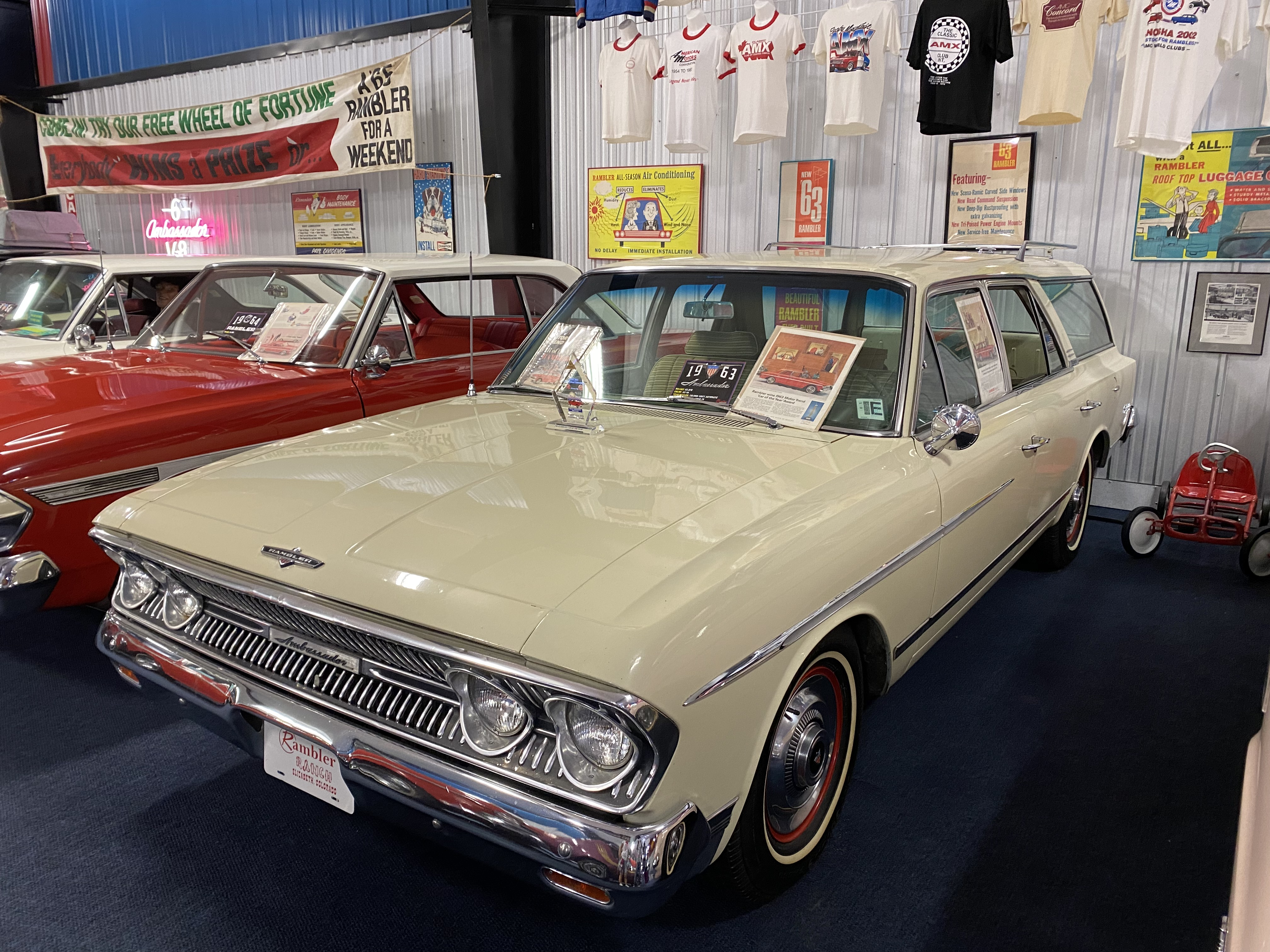
1963 Rambler Ambassador Cross Country station wagon

In 1962, Romney resigned from AMC to run for Governor of Michigan, a position he won. The automaker's new president, Roy Abernethy, reacted to the mounting competition (in 1963, AMC built as many cars as they had in 1960, but overall total car sales had increased so much that it gave the automaker sixth place in domestic production; the same output in 1960 had put them third) in a logical way: "Let's get rid of this Romney image."

A completely redesigned larger Rambler lineup appeared. The new cars continued the philosophy of building smaller cars than its larger "Big Three" competitors. However, they also had a high degree of interchangeability in parts to keep tooling costs and production complexity to a minimum. The automaker, which pioneered "styling continuity", introduced all-new styling for the 1963 model year Ambassadors and claimed that these were "functional changes .... not change just for the sake of change". The Ambassadors featured a 4-inch (102 mm) longer wheelbase, but were 1.2-inch (30 mm) shorter due to reduced front and rear body overhangs, as well as a 3-inch (76 mm) drop in overall height.

Designed by Dick Teague, the 1963 Ambassador's shape was much tighter, cleaner, and smoother, with almost all of its parts interchangeable between it and the new Classic. All Ambassadors used unitized structure instead of the more rattle-prone, traditional body-on-frame construction, which was still the industry standard. In 1963, AMC's new 112 in (2,845 mm) wheelbase cars (Ambassadors and Classics) used a revolutionary method of unit construction, which automobile manufacturers have almost universally adopted. AMC Ambassador and Classics used outer panels stamped from single sheet metal panels that included door frames and outer rocker panels. This resulted in an extremely rigid and rattle-free structure, better fit of doors into frames, production cost savings as well as reduced noise, vibration, and harshness. The "uniside" structure was superior to the conventional production methods in which multiple smaller pieces were welded together. There were 30% fewer parts and the result was greater structural rigidity, quieter car operation, and an overall weight reduction of about 150 pounds (68 kilograms).

Curved side glass and push-button door handles were new and costly upgrades. Still, they contributed to the new Rambler's handsome, elegant, and modern Mercedes-like bodyside styling by adding refinement to the car's configuration and details. At the time, curved side glass was used exclusively in a few much more expensive luxury cars. The design attribute increased interior room and visibility, reduced wind noise, and enhanced the styling of the vehicles. The Ambassador also featured a squared-off Thunderbird-type roofline. The front end featured forward-thrusting upper and lower ends with a vertical bar "electric shaver" chrome grille insert. The Ambassador's grille was differentiated from the Classic's grille by including the Ambassador's name in script within the small horizontal bar between the upper and lower grille sections. Round quad headlights were slightly recessed in chrome bezels mounted side by side within the grille at its outermost edges. Overall, the new Ambassadors were described by the staff of Automotive Fleet magazine as "probably the finest looking cars ever produced by American Motors".

Ambassadors were again available in two-door sedan, four-door sedan, and four-door station wagon body styles, but new trim lines debuted for 1963. A "Mercedes-like three-number model designation was developed" with the 800 as the Ambassador's base trim model (replacing the previous year's Super model) for the police, taxi, and fleet market, a 880 model (in place of the Custom), and the up-level 990 trim (replacing the previous 400 models).

The 1963 Ambassadors were offered only with the 327 cu in (5.4 L) V8, in either 250 hp (186 kW; 253 PS) two-barrel or 270 hp (201 kW; 274 PS) four-barrel versions. AMC's smaller 287 cu in (4.7 L) V8 engine was only offered in the Classic line. The automatic transmission was controlled by a steering column-mounted lever, replacing the previous pushbutton system. Maintenance was reduced with service intervals of the front wheel bearings increased from 12,000–25,000 miles (19,312–40,234 kilometres), the recommended engine oil change was at 4,000 miles (6,437 kilometres), and all Ambassador models included an alternator and an electronic voltage regulator as standard equipment.

Sales were brisk, and the redesign was billed a success, with Motor Trend Magazine bestowing Car of the Year status on the entire 1963 Rambler line, including the Ambassador. The marketing formula for the Ambassador generated record sales for the model, with buyers favoring more luxury and features, as evidenced by the Ambassador 990 models outselling the 880 versions by nearly two-to-one, while the base 800 model was less popular and had a total of 43 two-door sedans built for the year. The automaker did not have the resources of GM, Ford, and Chrysler, nor the sales volume to spread out its new model tooling and advertising costs over large production volumes; however, Richard Teague "turned these economical cars into smooth, streamlined beauties with tons of options and V-8 pep".

=== 1964 ===
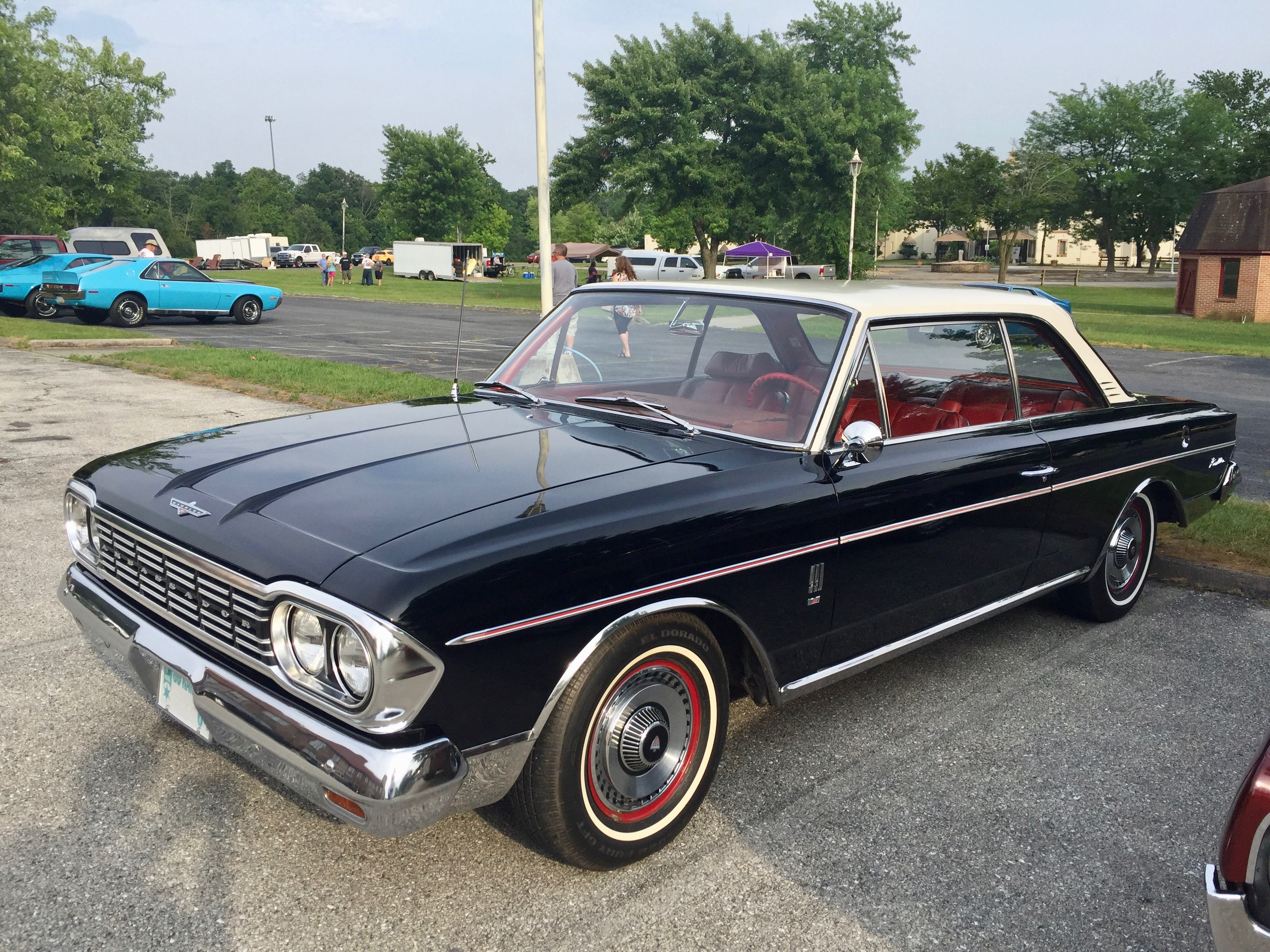
1964 Rambler Ambassador 990-H

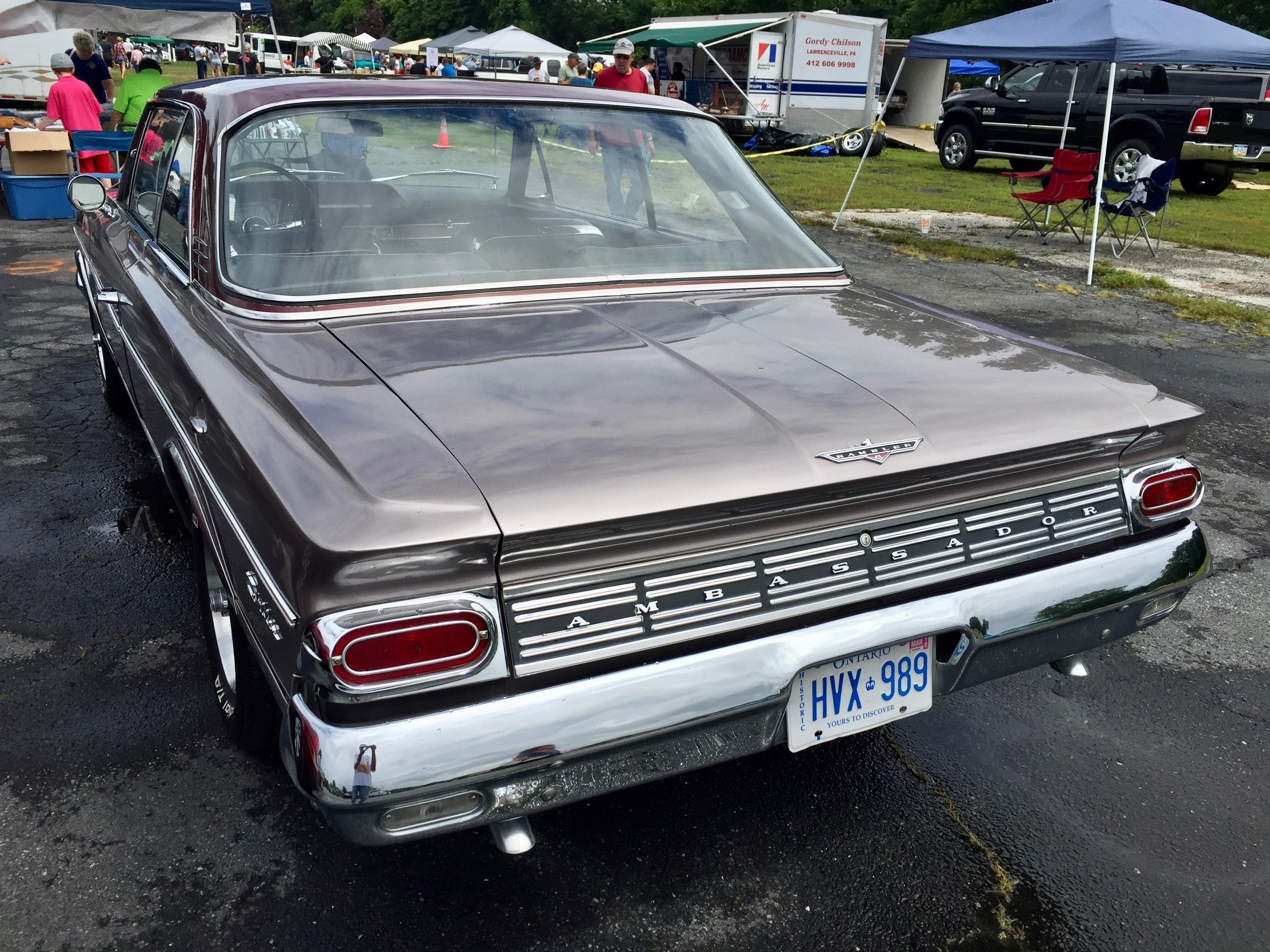
1964 Rambler Ambassador 990-H

The 1964 model year introduced minor trim changes and new options for the Ambassador line as AMC emphasized the transformed Rambler American compact-sized models. The "electric-shaver" grille on the 1963 model was replaced with a flush-mounted design, and the engine and transmission options were widened. A two-door hardtop body style called 990-H was added for the first time since 1957. The base 880 models were dropped from the line.

The 1964 Ambassadors featured the 250 hp (186 kW; 253 PS) two-barrel 327 cu in (5.4 L) V8 as standard, with the four-barrel 270 hp (201 kW; 274 PS) version as optional. The automaker did not offer a four-speed manual transmission to compete with Ford or GM's sporty mid-size V8 offerings. Instead, AMC offered its innovative "Twin-Stick" manual transmission. The "Twin-stick" option consisted of a three-speed manual transmission, operated by one of the two console-mounted "sticks" in conjunction with an overdrive unit that was controlled by the second "stick" in both second and third gears. This gave the driver the option of using five forward gears.

The 990-H was the most luxurious two-door model and included the high-compression 270 hp (201 kW; 274 PS) V8 as well as a specially trimmed interior featuring 2+2-style bucket seats, center armrests front and rear, as well as a console with the Twin-Stick manual or available automatic transmission. Approximately 2,955 top-trim Ambassadors were built.

The 1964 models followed Romney's focus on practical cars under the theory that AMC could build them for longer periods of time without expensive redesigns, thus help the small automaker to achieve some economies of scale that the Big Three enjoyed.

==== Rambler Marquesa ====
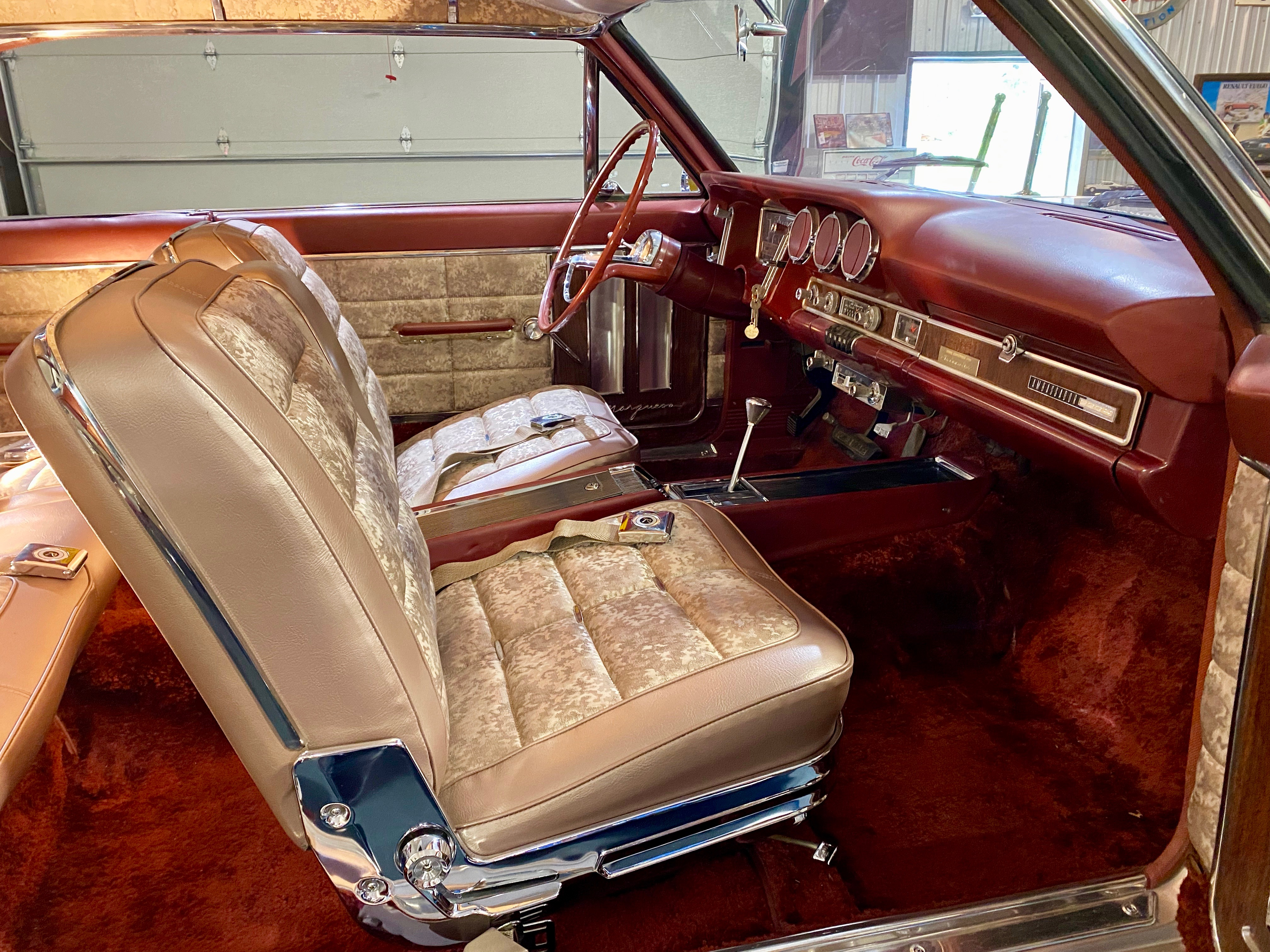
Interior of the 1964 Rambler Ambassador Marquesa show car

The Rambler Marquesa, a concept car based on the Ambassador 990-H two-door hardtop, was designed to gauge public reaction to potential styling and feature enhancements. American Motors displayed it at various auto shows during the 1964 model year. Information about its existence faded following its exhibition. However, the show car remained in its original condition and is now on display at the Rambler Ranch in Elizabeth, Colorado, the most comprehensive collection of Nash, Rambler, and AMC vehicles and their history.

The show car is finished in a two-tone paint scheme, featuring a darker, contrasting color on the roof, a popular styling trend of the mid-1960s. The exterior also features a simulated wire wheel covers with a spinner and a design to show the painted steel road wheel matching the roof finish. The car also has the original B.F. Goodrich premium "Life-Saver 880" bias-ply tires featuring dual white side wall stripes and a built-in puncture sealant. The interior features brocade fabric upholstered bucket seats with vinyl bolsters. The textile extends to the headliner and the door panel trim. The center console houses the automatic transmission shifter and centrally located power window switches.

== Fifth generation (1965–1966) ==
Fifth generation
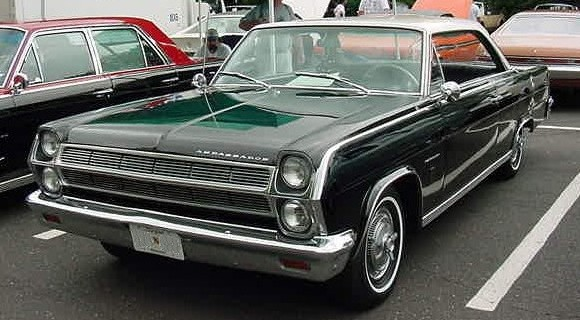
- 1965 Rambler Ambassador 990 2-door hardtop

Overview
- Also called: Rambler Ambassador; AMC Ambassador
- Model years: 1965–1966

Body and chassis
- Body style: 2-door sedan; 4-door sedan; 4-door station wagon; 2-door hardtop; 2-door convertible

Powertrain
- Engine: 232 cu in (3.8 L) I6; 287 cu in (4.7 L) V8; 327 cu in (5.4 L) V8
- Transmission: 3-speed manual; 3-speed with overdrive; "Twin-Stick" on console (1965); 4-speed manual (1966); 3-speed automatic; 3-speed "Shift-Command" on console

Dimensions
- Wheelbase: 116 in (2,946 mm)
- Length: 200 in (5,080 mm)

=== 1965 ===
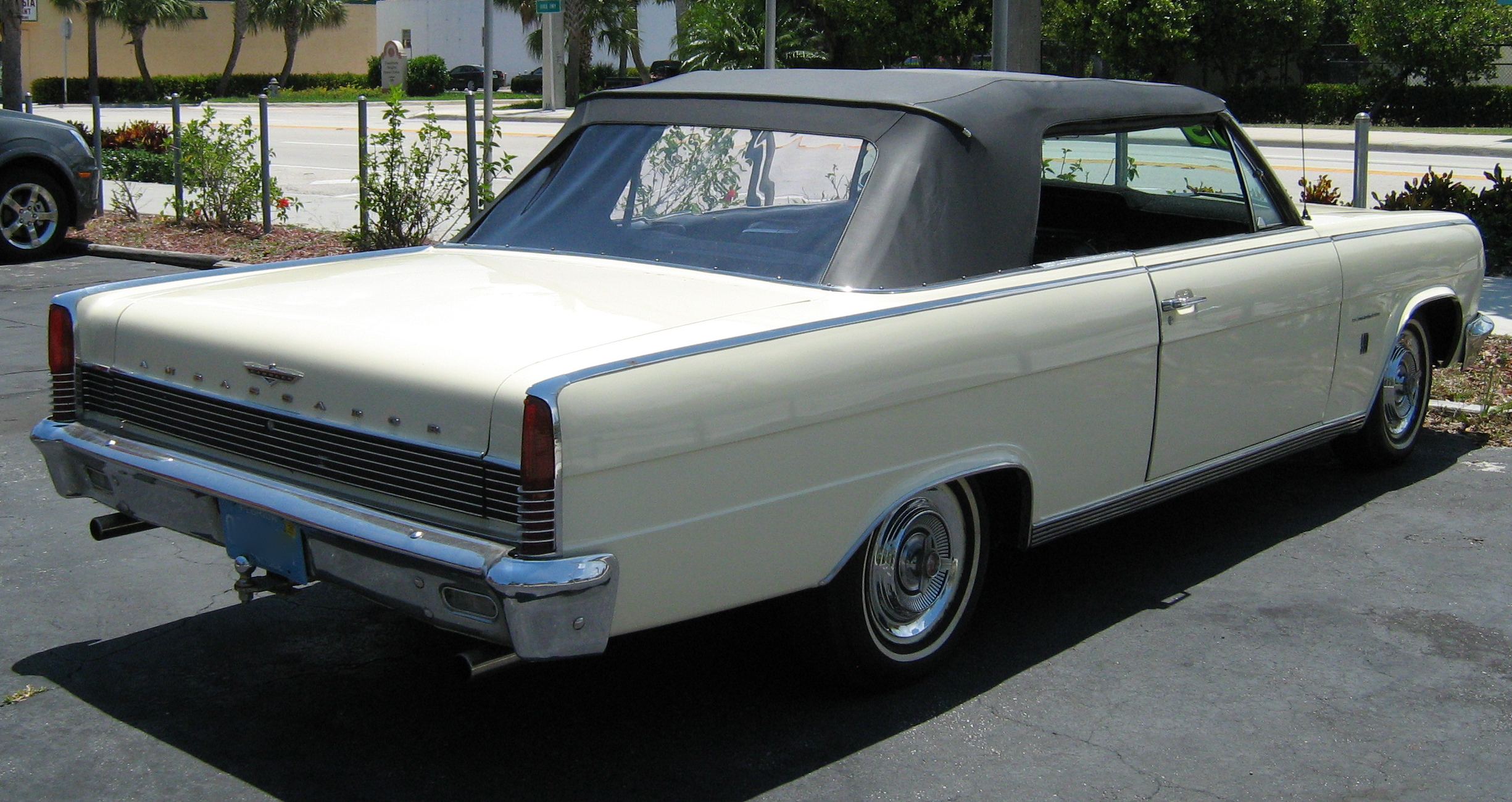
1965 Ambassador 990 convertible

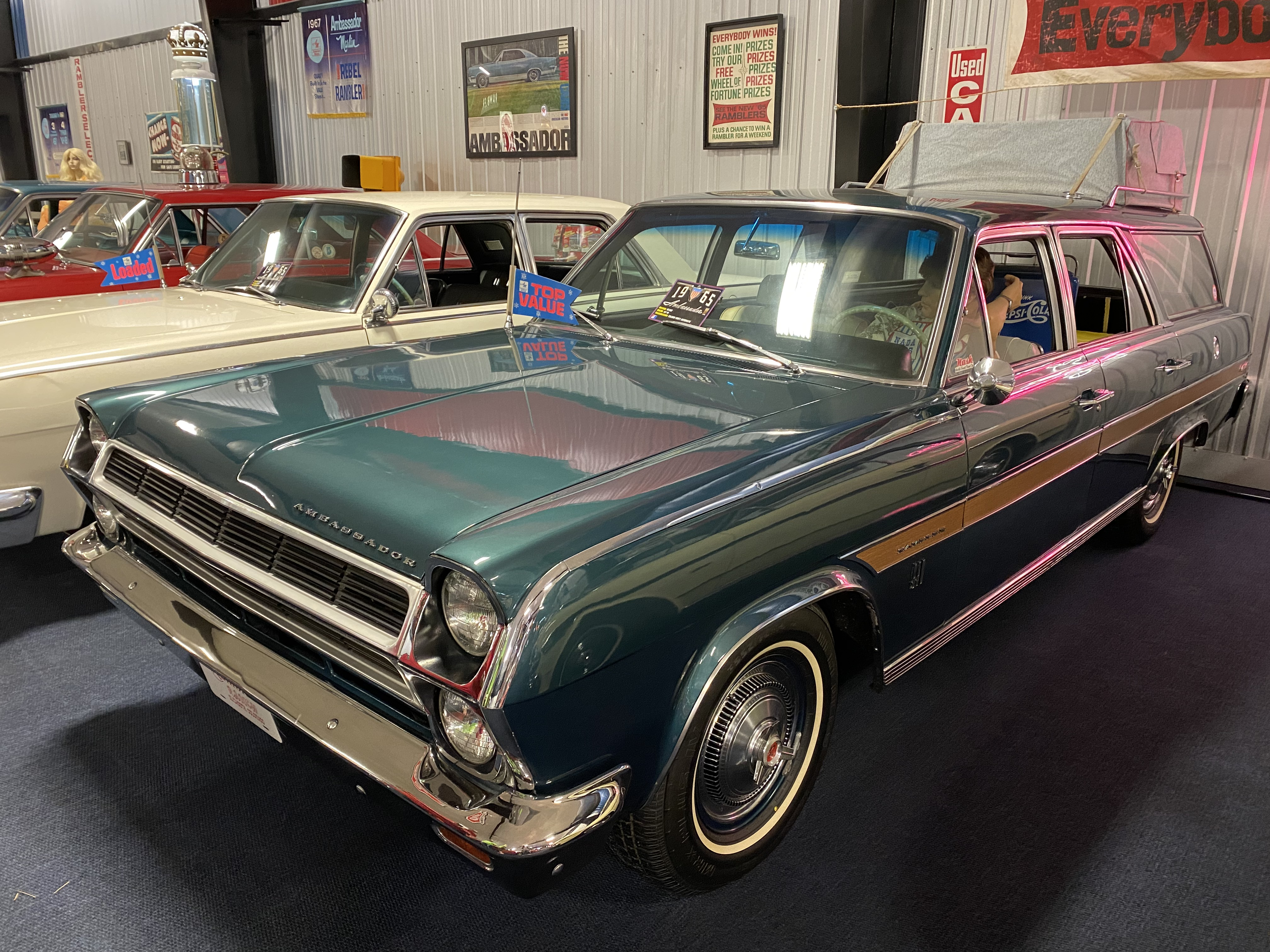
1965 Ambassador 990 Cross Country station wagon with optional woodgrain body side trim

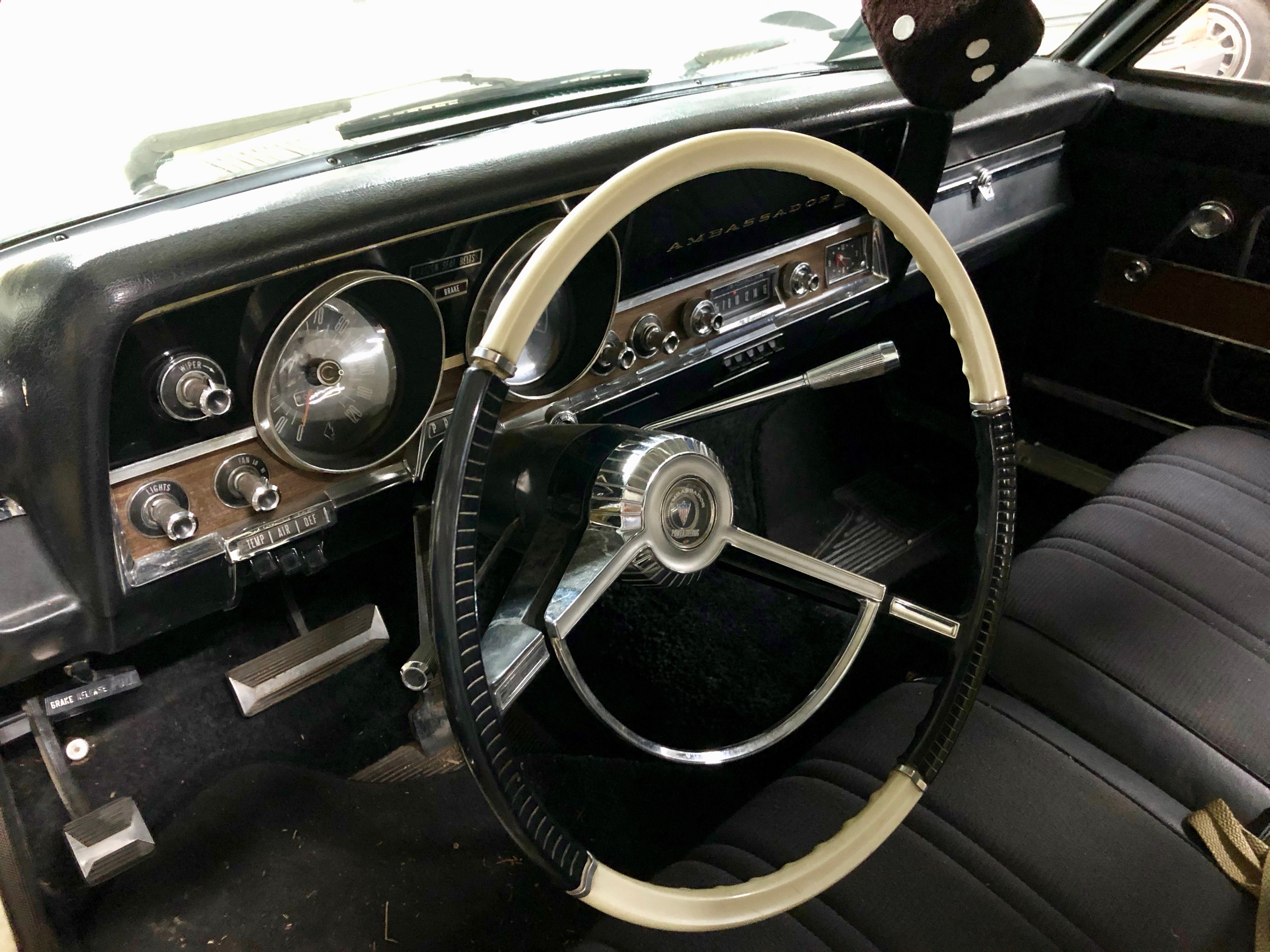
1965 Ambassador interior and new dashboard

No matter how much success the new Ramblers achieved in the marketplace, Roy Abernethy was not completely satisfied. Using the experience he gained as an outstanding salesman as a guide, Abernethy closely looked at the direction that American Motors' competition was going and decided that the company would be much more successful if its products competed more directly with the Big Three. Abernethy put the promise of higher profit margins per car over sales volume. He would achieve this by pushing all AMC vehicles further upmarket among the various market segments, shaking off the company's economy car image, and offering vehicles once again in all three major American car size classes: compact, intermediate, and full-size. The American and Classic were strong competitors in the former two segments, so for the 1965 model year, he set his sights on turning the Ambassador into a proper full-size car by stretching the Classic's wheelbase and giving it different styling. The general sizes of automobiles at that time were set by the industry's wheelbase length standards, rather than the modern vehicle classification by interior and cargo space. The 1965 Ambassador represented a fundamental shift in corporate ideology, a shift away from primarily fuel-efficient vehicles, to bigger, faster, and potentially more profitable cars.

Although the Ambassador rode the same platform as its 1963 and 1964 forebears, the 1965 models looked all-new. American Motors' designer Dick Teague styled the 1965 Ambassador with panache and gave the car an overall integrated look. Motor Trend magazine agreed, calling it a "strikingly handsome automobile". The overall linear design look could be described as "chunky" or "chiseled".

All Ambassadors were built on a 116-inch (2,946 mm) wheelbase, or four inches (100 mm) longer than the Classic models. Teague extended the beltline level from the stacked quad headlights to the vertical taillamps to stretch the cars visually. The Ambassador featured longer, squared-off rear fenders with vertical wrap-around taillights, taller trunk lid, squared-off rear bumper-mounted low, and squarer rear wheel arches. At the front, the Ambassador again sparked minor controversy with its new vertically stacked quad headlights, slightly recessed in their bezels, as they flanked an all-new horizontal bar grille. This new wall-to-wall grille projected horizontally in the center to create an effect somewhat opposite to the 1963's grille treatment.

The front-end design provided a bold, rugged appearance. According to automotive journalists. the new Ambassadors were as attractive as anything built by AMC's Detroit-based competitors, and with a list price of around $3,000, few could quibble about the cost of ownership.

As was the case before 1962, the Ambassador's entire extra wheelbase was ahead of the cowl, meaning that interior volume was the same as the intermediate-sized Classic. Another new body style debuted in the Ambassador lineup for 1965: an attractive new convertible offered as part of the 990 series. This was the first time a convertible was offered in the Ambassador line since 1948.

Ambassador body styles (except station wagons with three rows of seats and the 990-H hardtop) offered seating for six passengers, with hardtops and convertibles having the option of bucket seats with a center console and floor shifter. The Ambassador 990-H was a premium two-door hardtop model, available only in five-passenger form with the standard front bucket seats featuring fold-down center armrests and a retracting rear seat center armrest.

Ambassadors also saw an expanded list of trim lines, convenience options, and engine choices. Interiors were redesigned and featured a new dashboard. The 990 and 990-H models were continued, while the 880 models were the new economy leaders in the 1965 Ambassador line. Still, even the $2,512 price for the two-door sedan was not attractive compared to the models with better trim, bucket seats, and unique interiors. Ambassadors came standard with AMC's new 232 cu in (3.8 L) Inline-6 engine, which was the first time since 1956 that an Ambassador was available with six cylinders. Far more popular in the Ambassador, however, were the two time-tested 287 and 327 cu in (4.7 and 5.4 L) AMC V8 engines.

American Motors' management decided that the Ambassador could once again be available with a standard six-cylinder engine because its full-size competitors (e. g. Bel Air and Impala, Ford Custom 500 and Galaxie, as well as Plymouth Fury) came with six-cylinder engines as standard equipment. They, therefore, appealed to a broader range of customers than the Ambassador was getting. Also, since the Classic was now smaller and styled differently, the Ambassador six-cylinder would not cannibalize Classic six sales, which were the company's sales volume leaders. The changes were on target as sales of the repositioned Ambassador more than tripled.

The standard six-cylinder engine now featured larger valves making them the same as on the V8s. The front seatbacks were redesigned to offer additional legroom for rear-seat passengers with the popular reclining front seat backs now having seven positions, compared to the previous five. Front Bendix disc brakes with power assist were now optional.

Popular Mechanics magazine classified the Ambassadors as family cars describing the prototypes as solid, comfortable, and running "majestically". Motor Trend magazine tested an Ambassador convertible with a Twin-Stick overdrive transmission and found it commendably economical, averaging 16.4 mpg_{‑US} (14.3 L/100 km; 19.7 mpg_{‑imp}) over 1,000 miles (1,600 km) run, and noting that ... "Traveling comfort was the Ambassador's biggest selling point, along with its exceptionally powerful Bendix duo-servo drum brakes ...With the thin bucket seats that recline, driver and passengers can enjoy a high degree of riding comfort... Many passers-by commented on the car's good looks... Our summary: a nice, comfortable, quiet, well built family automobile that rather neglects the performance market."

Tom Magliozzi, one of the brothers hosting the Car Talk radio talk show, owned a black 1965 AMC Ambassador convertible that he called my "sleek black beauty" and wanted another one when asked "if you could have any car, new or old, what it would be?

==== Production ====
Production numbers

- 6585-5 990 four-door sedan: 24,852
- 6587-5 990 two-door convertible: 3499
- 6588-5 990 station wagon: 8701
- 6589-5 990 two-door hardtop: 5034
- 6589-7 990H two-door hardtop: 6382

==== Rambler Attaché ====
American Motors campaigned the Rambler Attaché, a specially prepared Ambassador convertible, for the auto show circuit. It was finished in deep-indigo pearlescent paint with red body side pinstripes, and the car was upgraded to real chrome wire wheels. The hood ornament featured a "crown-like Ambassador crest" while the interior's bucket seats were upholstered in indigo leather with ruby-red inserts.

=== 1966 ===
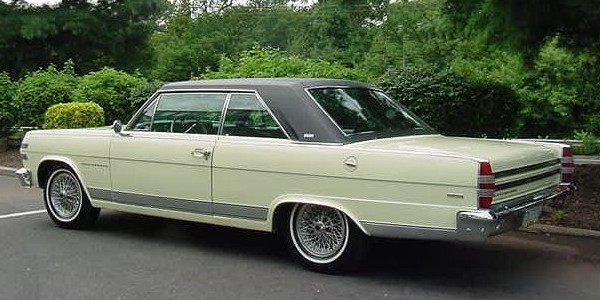
1966 hardtops featured a formal roof design – DPL model

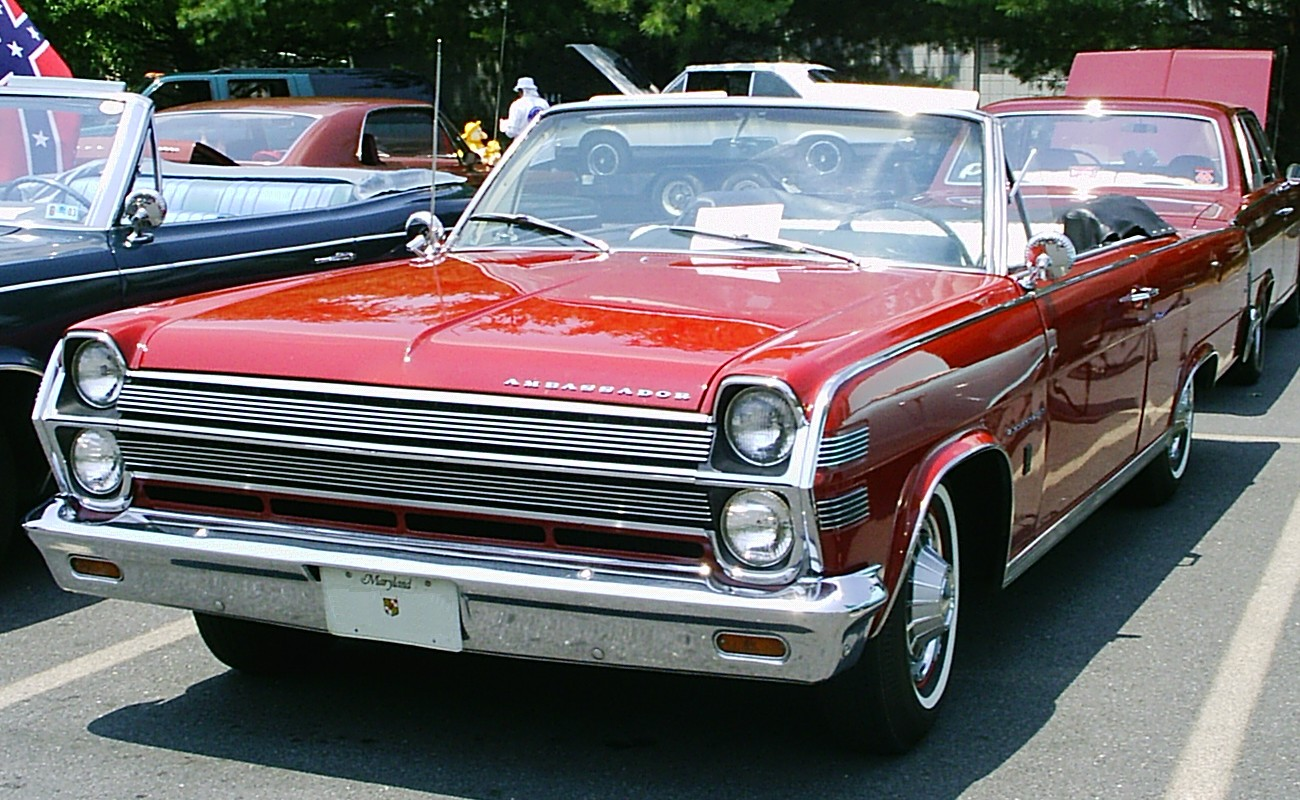
1966 AMC Ambassador 990 convertible

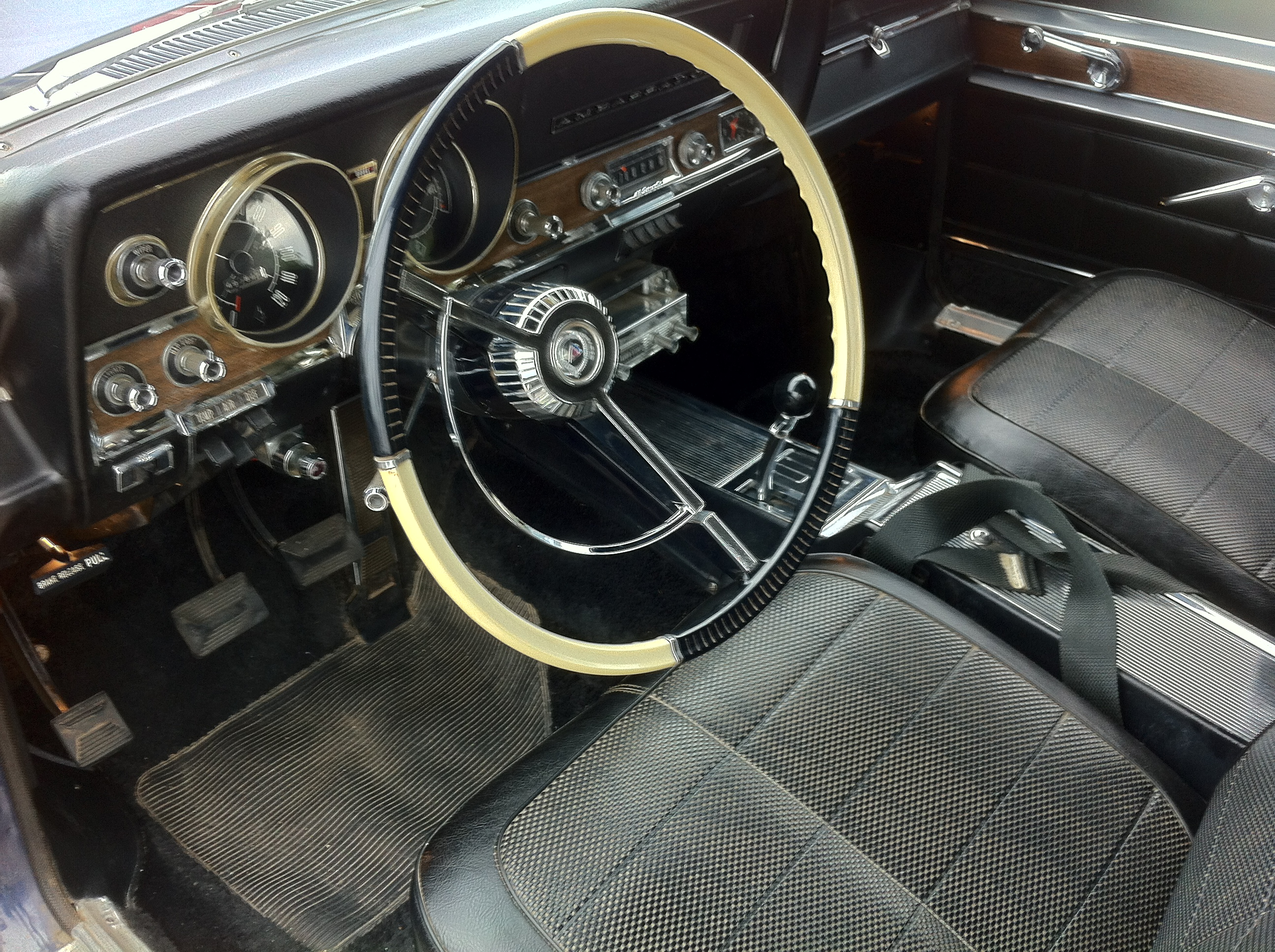
1966 Ambassador with factory original 4-speed on console

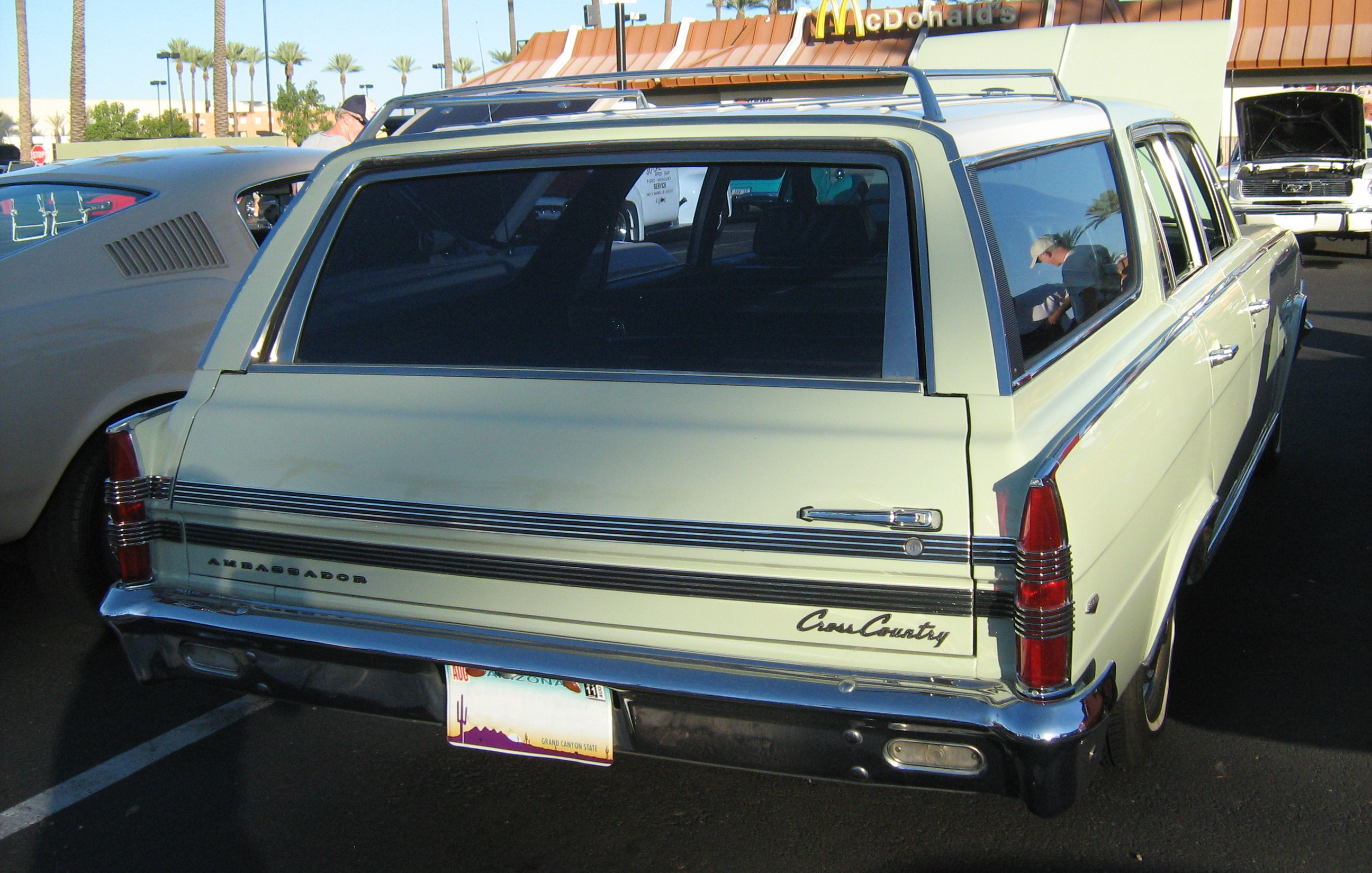
1966 Ambassador 990 Cross Country wagon

Only minor changes were introduced for the 1966 Ambassador range. The V-shaped horizontal louver spanned unbroken between the headlamps, and the effect was continued with twin rectangular trim pieces attached to the side of the front fenders at their leading edges by the headlamps. The styling effect was repeated in the new vertical wraparound taillamps, with the top-line models receiving a twin set of horizontal ribbed moldings across the back of the trunk lid that simulated the look of the front grille. The two-door hardtop received a redesigned roofline that was angular in appearance with angle-cut rear side windows and a rectangular rear window. The backlight no longer curved and wrapped slightly around the C-pillars. The changes made for a more "formal" notchback look that was popular at the time.

Station wagons also received a new roof (that did not have as pronounced dip over the rear cargo area) as well as a redesigned tailgate and optional simulated woodgrain exterior side panels. Available with two rows of seats with a standard bottom-hinged tailgate with electric, fully retracting rear window or an optional rear-facing third-row that featured a left side-hinged rear door, with a regular exterior door handle on the right side. All station wagons carried a Cross Country badge.

The 880 served as the base model line. The two-door sedan was the price leader at $2,404 but finished with the fewest sales for the model year. The more popular and higher trimmed 990 models were available in sedan, wagon, hardtop, and convertible versions. Options included a vinyl roof, wire wheel covers, AM/FM radio, adjustable steering wheel, and cruise control. A new luxury DPL sub-model (short for "Diplomat") two-door hardtop debuted at the top of the range.

The DPL included unique lower body side trim and numerous standard convenience items such as reclining bucket seats upholstered in brocade fabrics or optional vinyl. An optional interior trim featured houndstooth fabric and included two throw pillows. The DPL model was aimed to compete with the new, more upscale trimmed Plymouth VIP, Ford LTD, Chevrolet Caprice and Oldsmobile Cutlass Supreme.

The 232 cu in (3.8 L) I6, as well as the 287 and 327 cu in (4.7 and 5.4 L) V8s remained in the line, but transmission selections now included a new console-mounted four-speed manual. Most Ambassadors continued to be ordered with automatic transmissions.

Motor Trend magazine tested a 1966 DPL equipped with a 327 engine that "definitely has snap we hadn't felt before" and, even with an automatic transmission, experienced "healthy wheelspin from both rear wheels [because of the Twin-Grip limited-slip differential]... Subtle changes in this year's suspension, which include longer shocks and different springs, have a pronounced effect on the way the car feels and handles. Most welcome is the improved steering response. The car has a new feet-on-the-ground feeling, and body lean seems to have been reduced. The ride remains very good... As before, the interior is the outstanding feature of the Ambassador. Its quality is such that other luxury cars, even higher priced ones, could well imitate it...."

Perhaps the biggest change, however, was that the Ambassador lost its historic Rambler nameplate, as the car was now marketed as the "American Motors Ambassador" or "AMC Ambassador". Abernethy was again responsible for this marketing move, as he attempted to move the stylish new Ambassador even further upmarket. To him, that meant that the Rambler name and its economy car image would be eschewed to give the car a clean slate in a market that was turning away from a focus on economy and toward V8 performance. The evidence suggests that Abernethy was on the right track with moving the Ambassador upscale to compete with other manufacturers' luxury models as sales of the AMC's flagship jumped from 18,647 in 1964 to over 64,000 in 1965, and then in 1966, they went to more than 71,000. Although the Ambassador accounted for a mere fraction of total passenger car sales in the U.S., it was a step in bringing AMC's products in line with what the consumer of the day wanted.

== Sixth generation (1967–1968) ==
Sixth generation
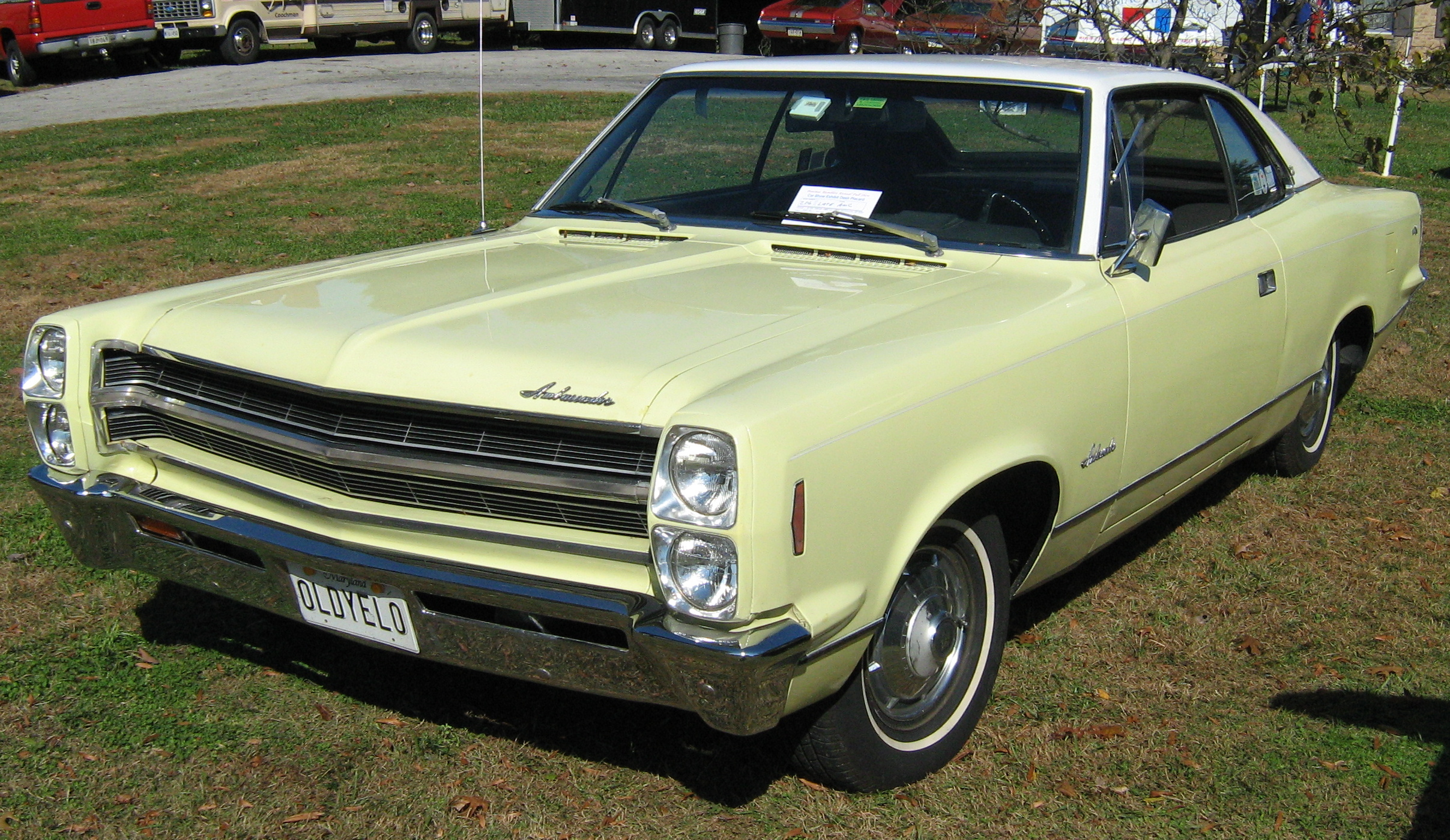
- 1968 AMC Ambassador hardtop

Overview
- Model years: 1967–1968

Body and chassis
- Body style: 2-door sedan (automobile) (1967 only); 4-door sedan; 4-door station wagon; 2-door hardtop; 2-door convertible (1967 only)

Powertrain
- Engine: 232 cu in (3.8 L) I6; 290 cu in (4.8 L) V8; 343 cu in (5.6 L) V8; 390 cu in (6.4 L) V8; (1968-1969)
- Transmission: 3-speed manual; 3-speed with overdrive; 4-speed manual floor shift; 3-speed BorgWarner automatic; 3-speed "Shift-Command" on center floor console

Dimensions
- Wheelbase: 118 in (2,997 mm)
- Length: 202.5 in (5,144 mm); 203 in (5,156 mm) (station wagons); 201.5 in (5,118 mm) (Marlin)
- Width: 78.4 in (1,991 mm) (1967); 77.2 in (1,961 mm) (1968)
- Height: 53.57 in (1,361 mm) (hardtop); 54.96 in (1,396 mm) (sedan); 55.41 in (1,407 mm) (wagon)
- Curb weight: 3,142 to 3,434 lb (1,425 to 1,558 kg)

=== 1967 ===
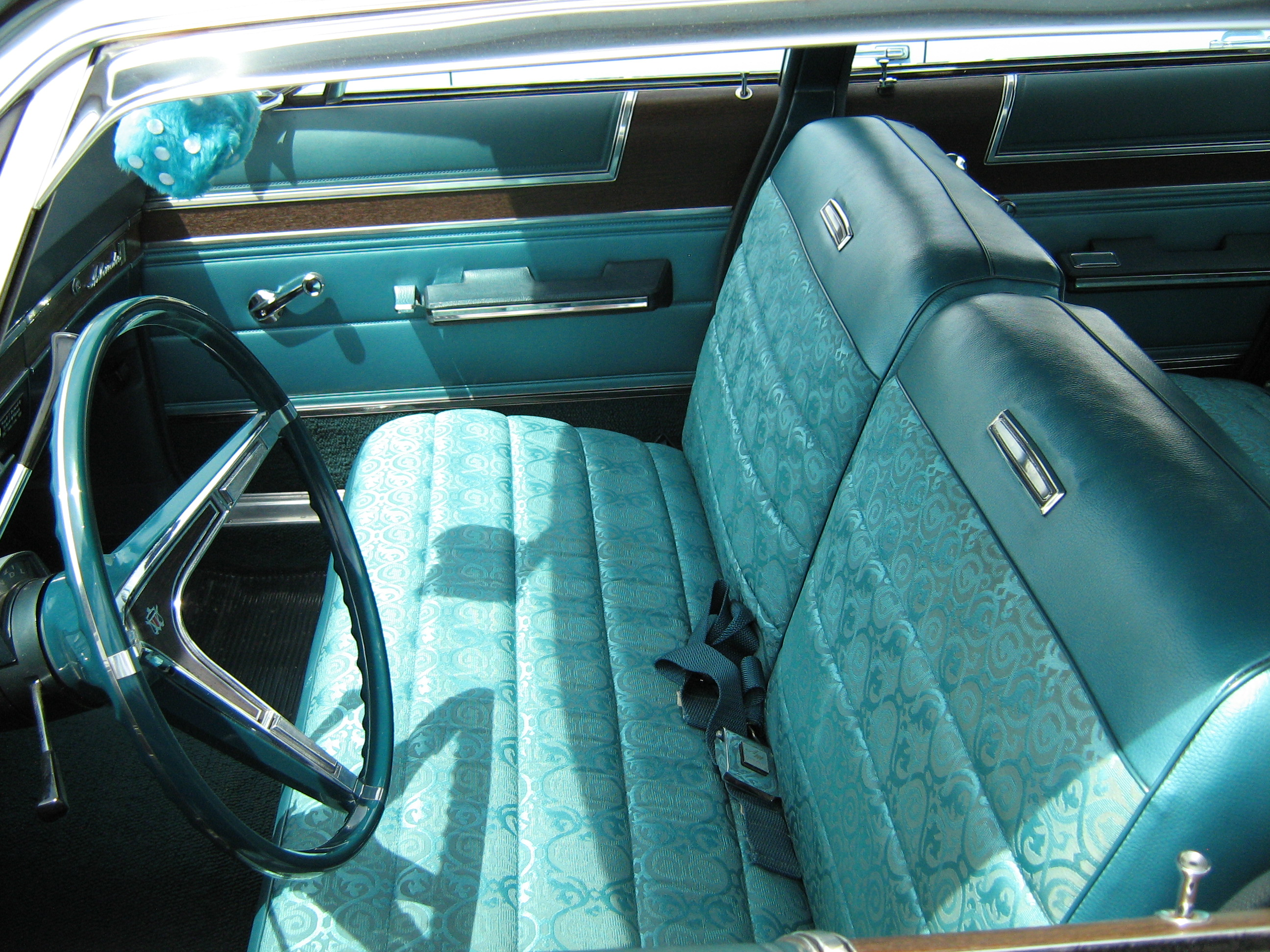
1967 Ambassador 990 standard interior

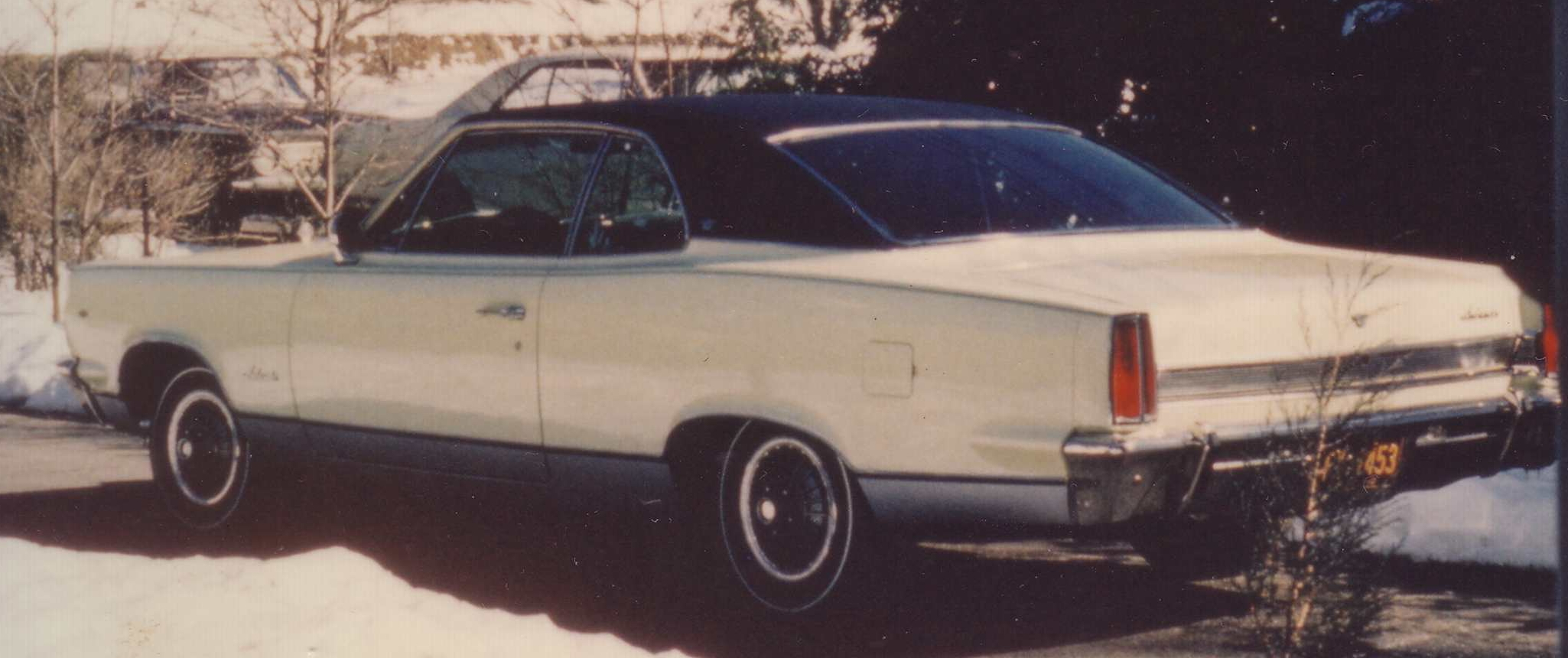
1967 Ambassador DPL hardtop with optional satin chrome trim

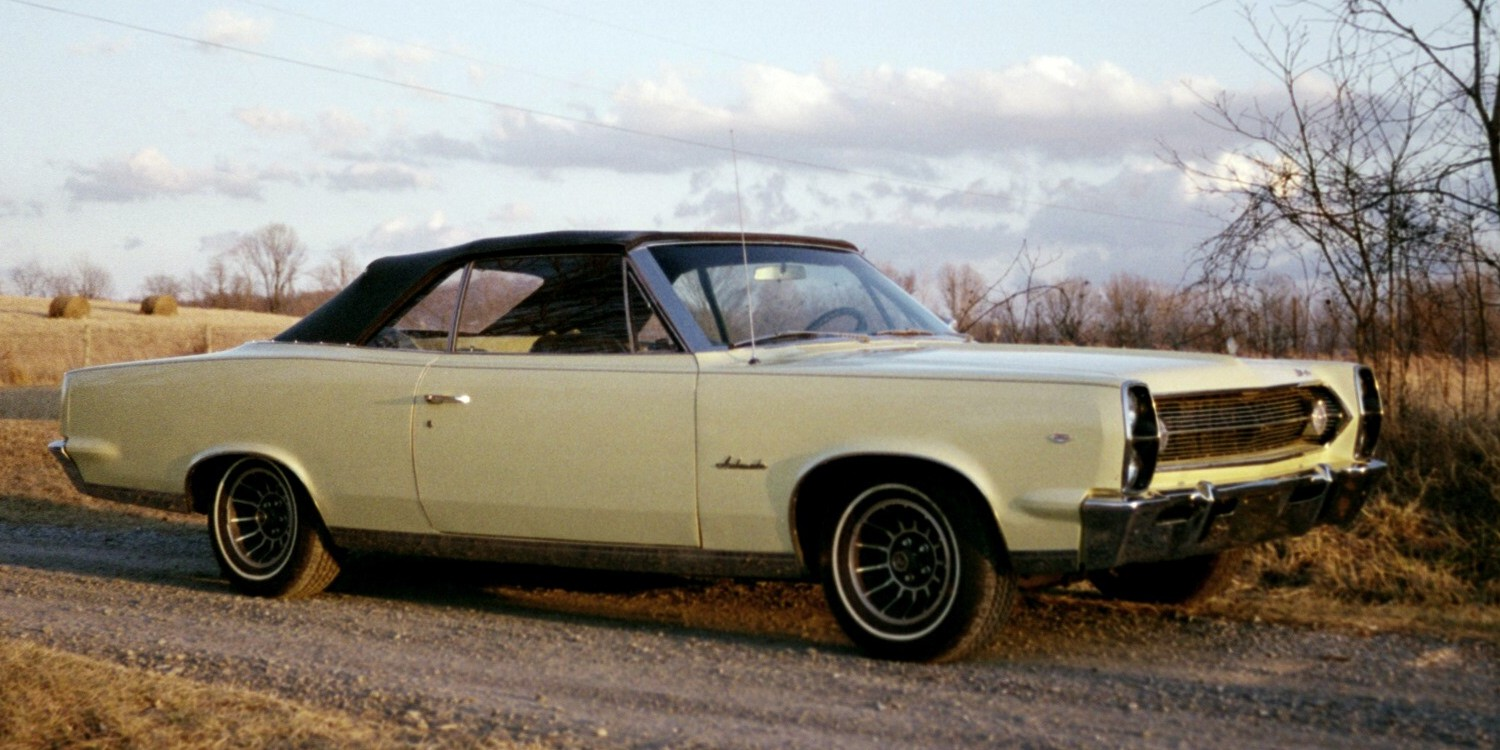
1967 Ambassador DPL convertible

American Motors introduced a completely restyled, longer, lower, and wider Ambassador for the 1967 model year, now riding on a 118 in (2,997 mm) wheelbase, or two inches (51 mm) longer than before. The Ambassador's platform was four inches (100 mm) longer than the new Rambler Rebel's 114-inch (2,896 mm) wheelbase. The Ambassador was positioned in the standard-size category, against traditional big cars such as Ford Galaxie, Chevrolet Impala, and Plymouth Fury. The convertible was offered again—this time in DPL trim—for 1967; but this would be the final year with 1,260 built. It featured an all-new "split stack" folding mechanism with concealed side rails that did not intrude into the backseat area, thus offering room for three adult passengers in the rear.

The car once again looked completely new, with a more rounded appearance that sported sweeping rooflines, "coke-bottle" fenders, greater glass area, and a recessed grille that bowed forward less than that of the 1965–66 models. Taillights were wider, rectangular, and divided by one central vertical bar. Motor Trend magazine described the all-new styling of the new Ambassador as "attractive" and "more graceful and easier on the eye in '67".

The 880 two-door sedans featured the identical roofline as the hardtops, but had slim B-pillars that gave them a more open-air "coupe" appearance and were marketed as "Sports Sedans". The 880 trim was also available in four-door sedan and station wagon versions, but more popular were the better equipped and more upscale 990 models came in four-door sedan, station wagon, and two-door hardtop body styles. Adding more elegance to DPL two-door hardtops and convertibles was the optional "Satin-Chrome" finish (paint code P-42) for the lower body side replacing the standard full-length stainless steel rocker moldings. A black or white vinyl cover was optional on 990 and DPL sedans and hardtops. The 990 Cross Country station wagons were available with 3M's "Di-noc" simulated wood-grain body side panels trimmed in a slim stainless steel frame.

The full-sized Ambassador featured a lengthy list of standard features and options. The interiors "rival more expensive cars for luxury and quality, yet are durable enough to take years of normal wear". The premium materials and fittings included wood-grain trim and even an optional "Custom" package with unique upholstery and two matching pillows. Ambassador DPL hardtops included reclining bucket seats with a center armrest between them (with a center cushion for a third occupant or a floor console with gear selector), as well as a foldaway center armrest for the rear seat. The new safety-oriented instrument panel grouped all gauges and controls in front of the driver, with the rest of the dashboard pushed forward and away from the passengers. Focusing on safety, there were now no protruding knobs, the steering column was designed to collapse under impact, and the steering wheel was smaller than previous Ambassadors.

The long-lived "GEN-1" family of AMC V8 engines was replaced by an all-new line of 290 and 343 cu in (4.8 and 5.6 L) engines that debuted for 1966 in the Rambler American. These V8s were an all-new design featuring a thin-wall-casting block, heads, and manifold. With a four-barrel carburetor and dual exhaust, the 343 cu in (5.6 L) produced 280 bhp (209 kW) at 4800 rpm and 365 lb⋅ft (495 N⋅m) of torque. A new four-link trailing-arm rear suspension system eliminated the old torque tube design, providing a more comfortable coil spring ride.

American Motors promoted the new 1967 Ambassador as an "uncompromising automobile with the red carpet ride" in print advertisements, as well as in an innovative TV commercial. However, sales of the redesigned models were disappointing due to customer confusion caused by the entire company's abrupt upmarket push, which seemed uncomfortably "me too" to the traditional domestic Big Three's customers. They also alienated American Motors' loyal buyer base. Abernethy's ideas for entering new markets were not working. These strategy changes led to a new round of financial problems for American Motors. Because of this, Abernathy was later that year released from AMC by its board of directors and replaced by William V. Luneberg and Roy D. Chapin Jr.

==== USPS sedans ====
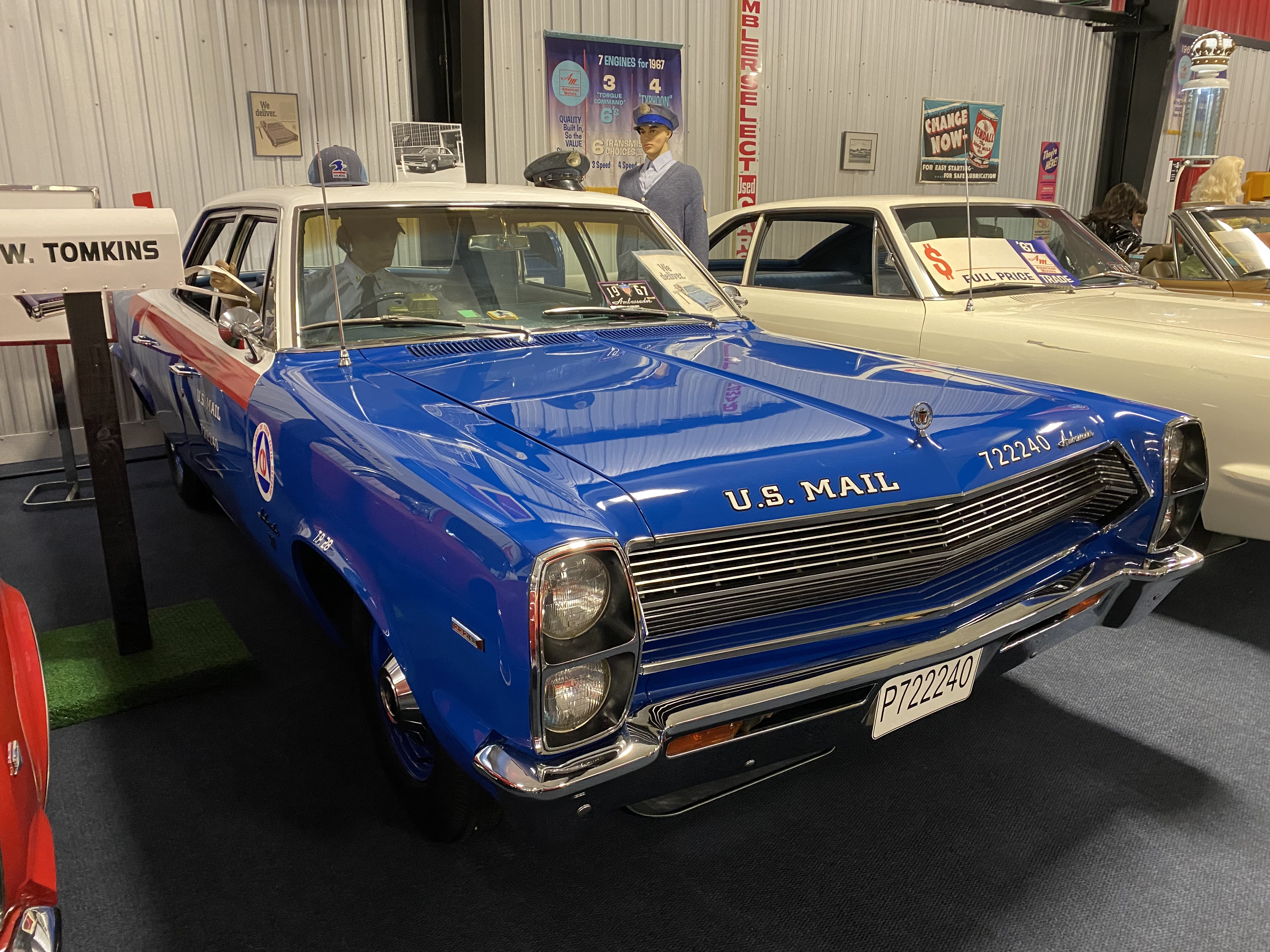
USPS 1967 AMC Ambassador

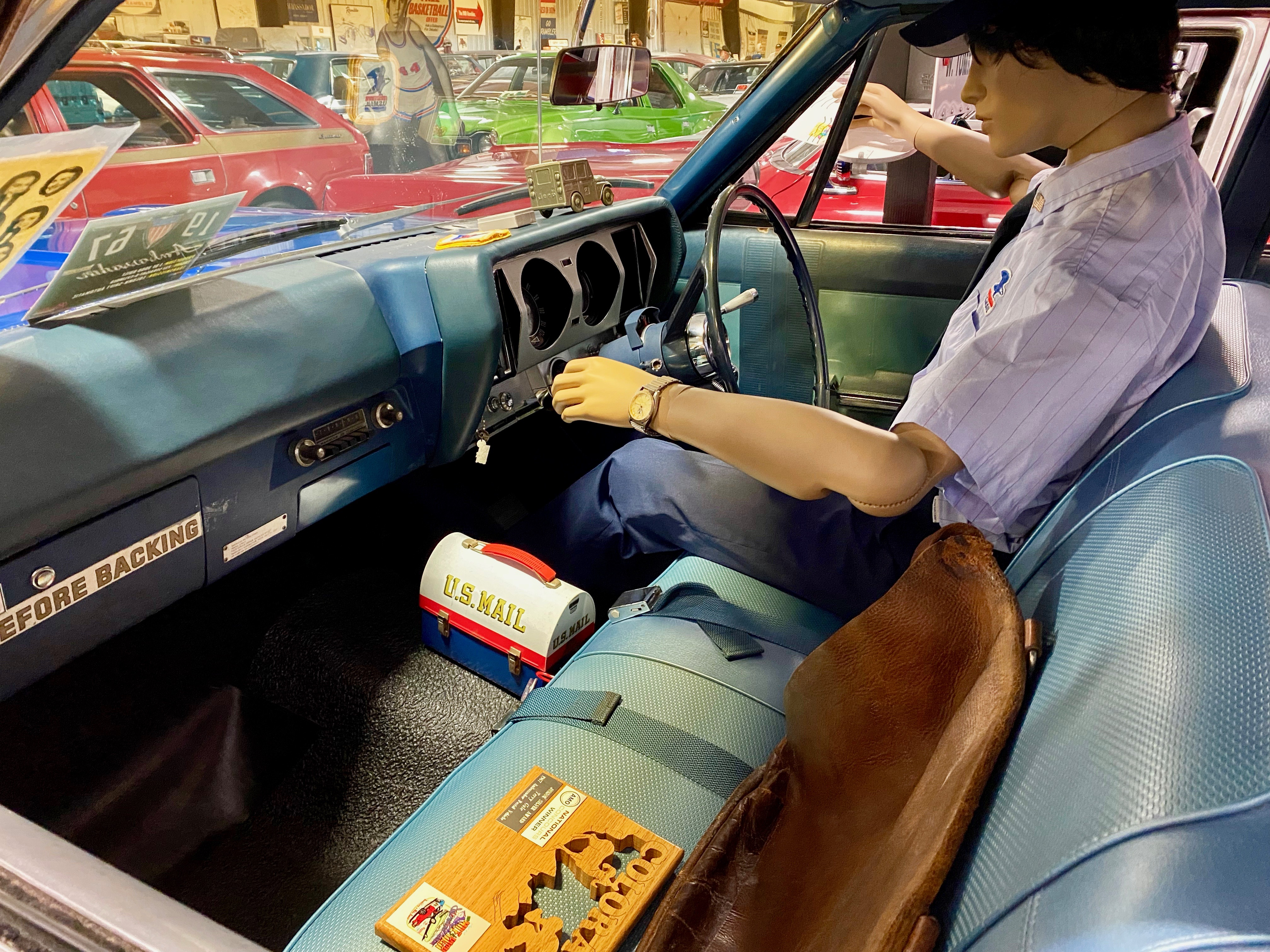
Right-hand-drive AMC Ambassador built for the US Postal Service

American Motors provided specialized fleet options for commercial and municipal customers. Taxi and police versions were subjected to heavy use and the options were not available to the general public. A purchase order was made by the General Services Administration (GSA) of 3,745 Ambassador base 880 four-door sedans for use by the United States Postal Service (USPS), most to be built in factory right-hand-drive. There were six vehicles for review for this purchase and tested was a left-hand drive AMC Ambassador 880 sedan with its back seat removed.

Not all of the units ordered for the postal service had right-hand drive. Specifications included factory heavy-duty fleet options such as rubber floor mats, upholstery, and the deletion of the rear seat. Most came with the base 232 cu in (3.8 L) I6 engine along with column-shift automatic transmission and "Twin-Grip" (limited-slip differential). All came with an identification metal plate on the dash near the ashtray.

American Motors took advantage of this large fleet order to market the 1967 Ambassadors. Print advertisements in popular magazines headlined "We Deliver" with a picture of the USPS vehicles, while other ads described that Ambassadors would provide safety, reliability, and a "red-carpet" ride.

The engineering to make the cars right-hand-drive served as the template for other American Motors vehicles based on the Ambassador platform, destined for foreign right-hand-drive markets such as Australia, New Zealand, and the United Kingdom. The Rambler Rebel and its replacement, the AMC Matador, were, after that, built using the same RHD dash, steering, and instrumentation as the 1967 USPS Ambassador sedans for both built-up export to the United Kingdom, as well as for the knock-down kits supplied for local assembly in Australia and New Zealand. The Matador was built in Australia until 1976 in this way.

==== AMC Marlin ====
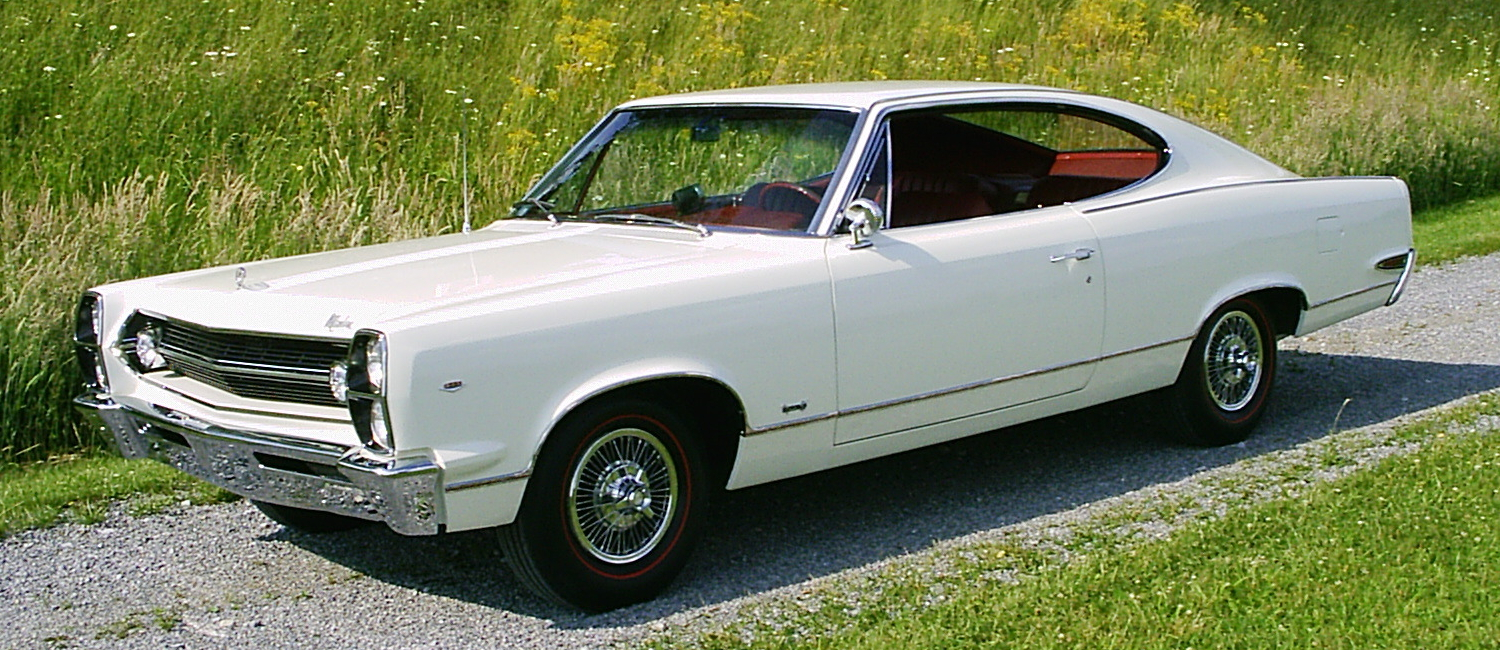
1967 AMC Marlin utilized the Ambassador platform with a unique fastback roof and rear half

The fastback Marlin two-door hardtop that was previously built on the Rambler Classic platform in 1965 and 1966, was continued for 1967, but was now based on the larger Ambassador platform. The total redesign of the related AMC intermediate and full-size platforms made it easy for the personal-luxury model shift to the Ambassador's longer 118 in (2,997 mm) wheelbase. It now featured the Ambassador's front end, longer hood, and luxury appointments with an even longer fastback roofline than the previous versions. The opinion of professional auto stylists is that the Ambassador-based design "produced the best result. In their view, the longer platform stretched out the profile and smoothed the lines."

=== 1968 ===
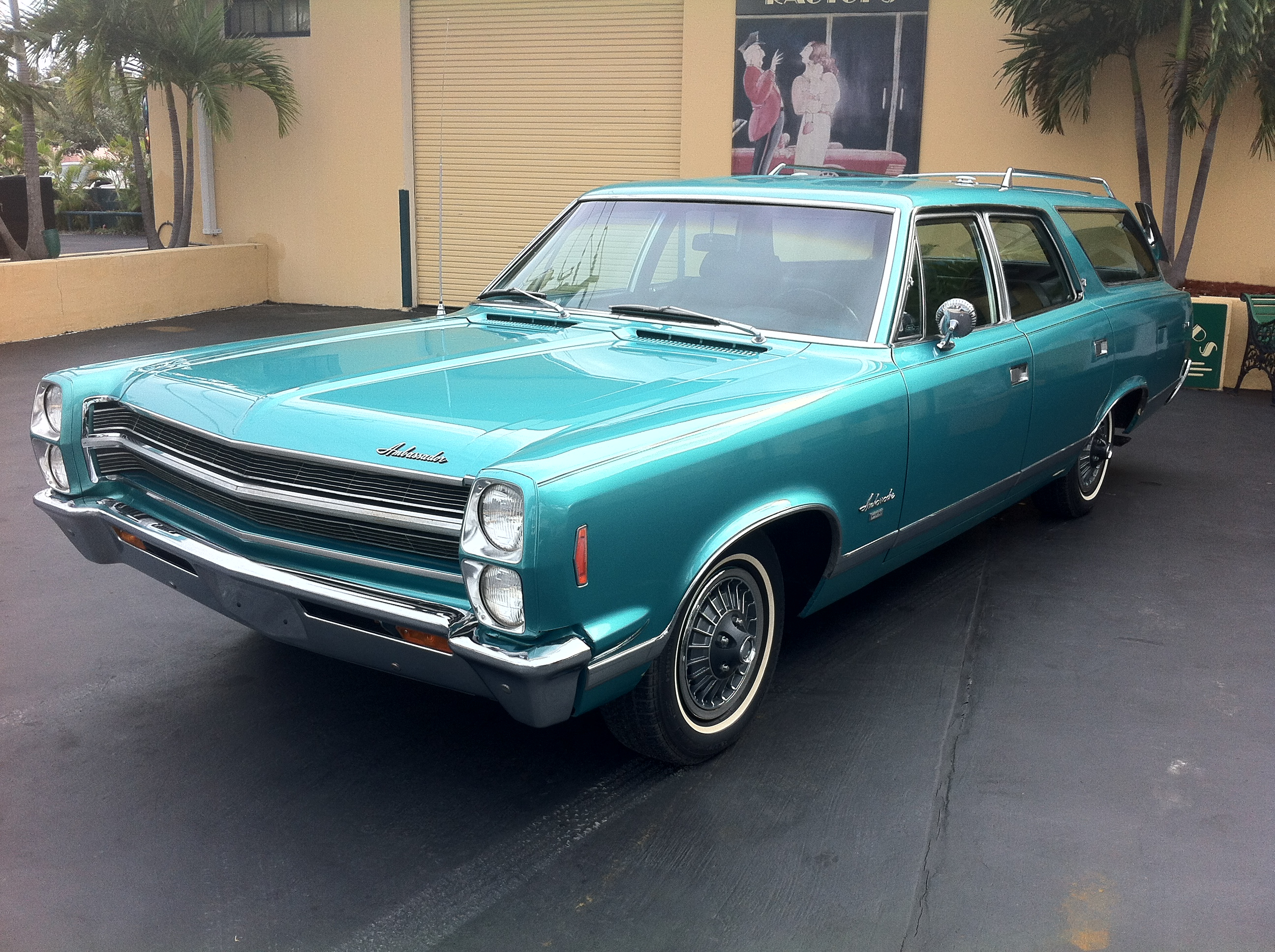
1968 AMC Ambassador DPL wagon

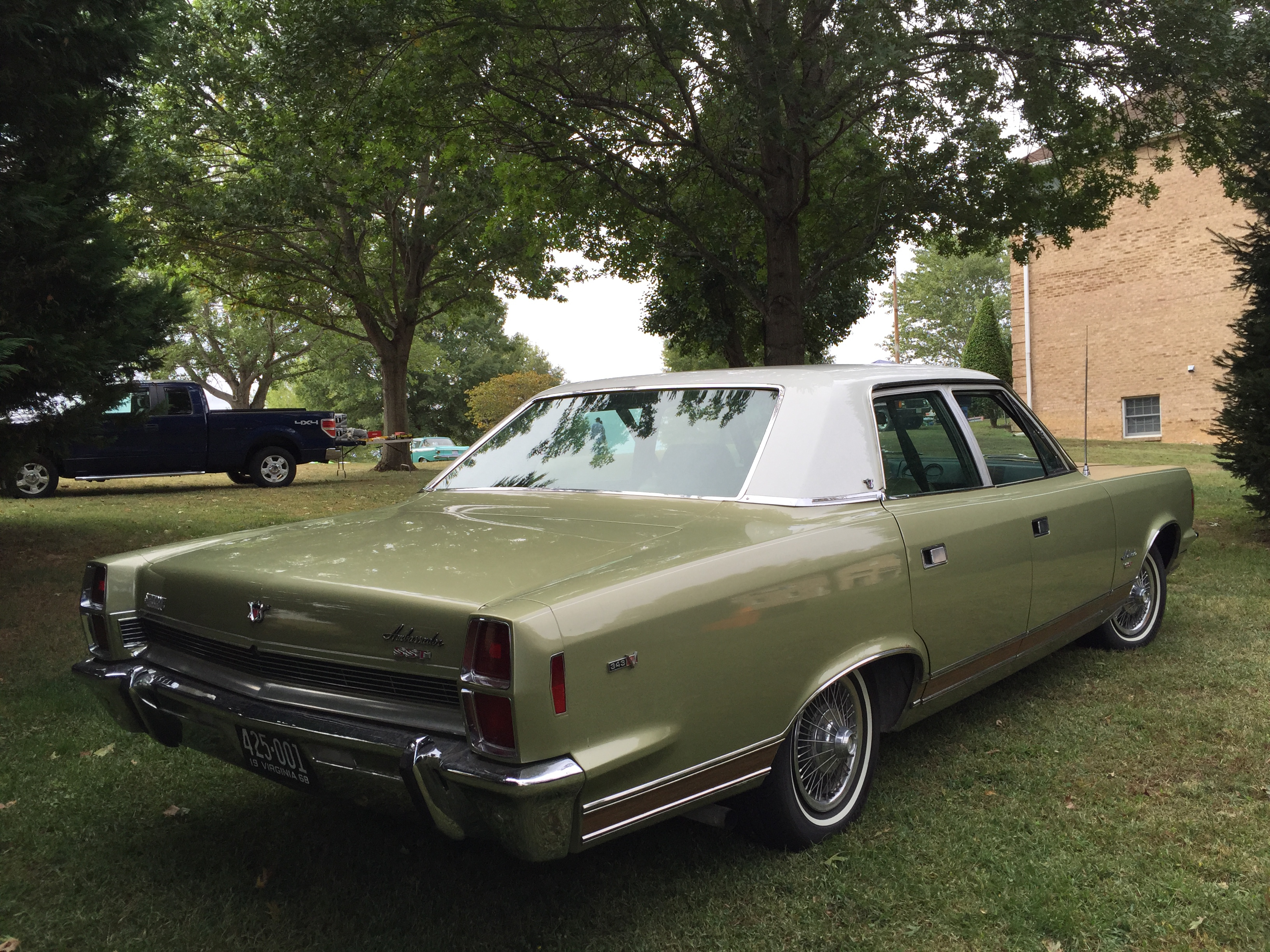
1968 AMC Ambassador SST sedan

American Motors was a pioneer in air conditioning through its Kelvinator refrigerator division. AMC's marketing chief Bill McNealy wanted to make the Ambassador stand out in a crowded market segment and decided to add more significant distinction to the 1968 Ambassador line by making the All Weather A/C system as standard equipment. This was the first time any volume car manufacturer had done so, something that even Cadillac and Lincoln had not offered on their luxury cars – although some of them were priced at more than twice as much as Ambassador.

Most Ambassadors were ordered with air conditioning, so AMC garnered effective marketing distinction at little cost by including it with the 1968 model year. While all Ambassadors came with it as standard, consumers could order the car without air as a "delete option" and decrease the price by $218. As AMC pointed out in their advertising campaign for the Ambassador, the only other major automaker that offered air conditioning as standard equipment on its cars in 1968 was Rolls-Royce. Air conditioning was standard only on Cadillac limousines.

Because of slow sales during the 1967 model year, both the top trim convertible and the basic two-door models were dropped for 1968. The new Ambassador lineup consisted of a base two-door hardtop and a four-door sedan, a mid-level DPL in three body styles (two-door hardtop, four-door sedan, and station wagon), and a new top-of-the-line SST available as a two-door hardtop or a four-door sedan. The personal luxury fastback Marlin that was based on the Ambassador platform was also discontinued to make way for the smaller 1968 AMC Javelin in the pony car segment.

The top-of-the-line 1968 Ambassador SST version was "especially appealing" and "a very luxurious package" with standard V8 power, air conditioning, expensive upholstery, individual reclining front seats, wood-look interior trim, upgraded exterior trim, as well as numerous conveniences such as an electric clock and a headlights-on buzzer. The high-level of standard equipment had marketing brochures asking, “Could that SST stand for Sensational Straight Through?" while reviews described the 1968 Ambassador SST as "The Kenosha Cadillac".

Styling changes were minor. Taillights were now recessed in body-color bezels divided by a single central horizontal bar. Front headlight bezels were now made of nylon and similarly body-colored. A new injection-molded ABS thermoplastic polymer grille was dominated by a horizontal bar that extended forward in the center from the sides, while its outline had squared off edges that wrapped ahead into the inner headlight extensions. Fender-mounted marker lights were added at the front and rear as standard equipment, as the U.S. National Highway Traffic Safety Administration (NHTSA) regulations mandated their application (along with seat belts beginning January 1, 1968) to all passenger cars sold in the United States for 1968.

However, AMC's most enduring styling feature debuted on the Ambassador for 1968, as flush-mounted paddle-style door handles replaced the former push-button units on all American Motors cars, save the compact Rambler American. The heavy, chromed door handles with push-buttons on the 1967 models were the most protruding body side feature, making the cars 78.4 in (1,991 mm) wide. The 1968 versions have the same bodyside and door sheetmetal, but the AMC's new door handle design was set completely flat against the door skin, eliminating the snag hazard and reducing the car's width to 77.2 in (1,961 mm). The practical and "disarmingly simple design" predated safety-related mandates and industry norms. The interior locking was no longer by the traditional windowsill push-button, but a lever set into the armrest.

Front-wheel alignment was made more accessible and more accurate by moving the camber adjustment from the upper to the lower control arm on the double wishbone suspension, and the caster angle adjustments also moved from the upper control arm to the drag strut. At midyear, AMC's new top engine, the AMX 390 cu in (6.4 L) 315 hp (235 kW; 319 PS) V8, became an option in the Ambassador line, bringing the total engine options up to four.

In June 1967, American Motors started a new advertising campaign created by Mary Wells Lawrence of the Wells, Rich, and Greene marketing agency. The US$12 million AMC account was high-profile assignment and helped established the agency as innovative and daring in its approach. The new advertising violated the convention of not directly attacking the competition, and AMC's campaigns became highly controversial. The publicity worked with AMC's total retail sales improving 13% for the fiscal year, but 1968 Ambassador numbers were slightly down.

The market positioning meant that "the AMC Ambassador was a car with no real competitors throughout most of the sixties" because it was viewed as a luxury-type car and could be put against the higher-end large-sized models from the domestic Big Three automakers even though it was more of a midsized car in overall dimensions. This strategy allowed AMC to offer a perceived premium experience in a more manageable package, appealing to a segment of consumers seeking refinement without the bulk of traditional American luxury cars.

== Seventh generation (1969–1973) ==
Seventh generation
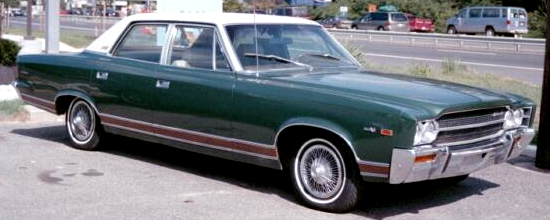
- 1969 AMC Ambassador SST 4-door sedan

Overview
- Also called: American Motors Ambassador; Rambler Ambassador
- Model years: 1969–1973

Body and chassis
- Class: Full-size
- Body style: 4-door sedan; 4-door station wagon; 2-door hardtop

Powertrain
- Engine: 232 cu in (3.8 L) I6; 258 cu in (4.2 L) I6; 290 cu in (4.8 L) V8; 304 cu in (5.0 L) V8; 343 cu in (5.6 L) V8; 360 cu in (5.9 L) V8; 390 cu in (6.4 L) V8; 401 cu in (6.6 L) V8

Dimensions
- Wheelbase: 122 in (3,099 mm)
- Length: 206.5 in (5,245 mm) (1969); 208 in (5,283 mm) (1970); 210.8 in (5,354 mm) (1971–72); 212.8 in (5,405 mm) (1973)

=== 1969 ===
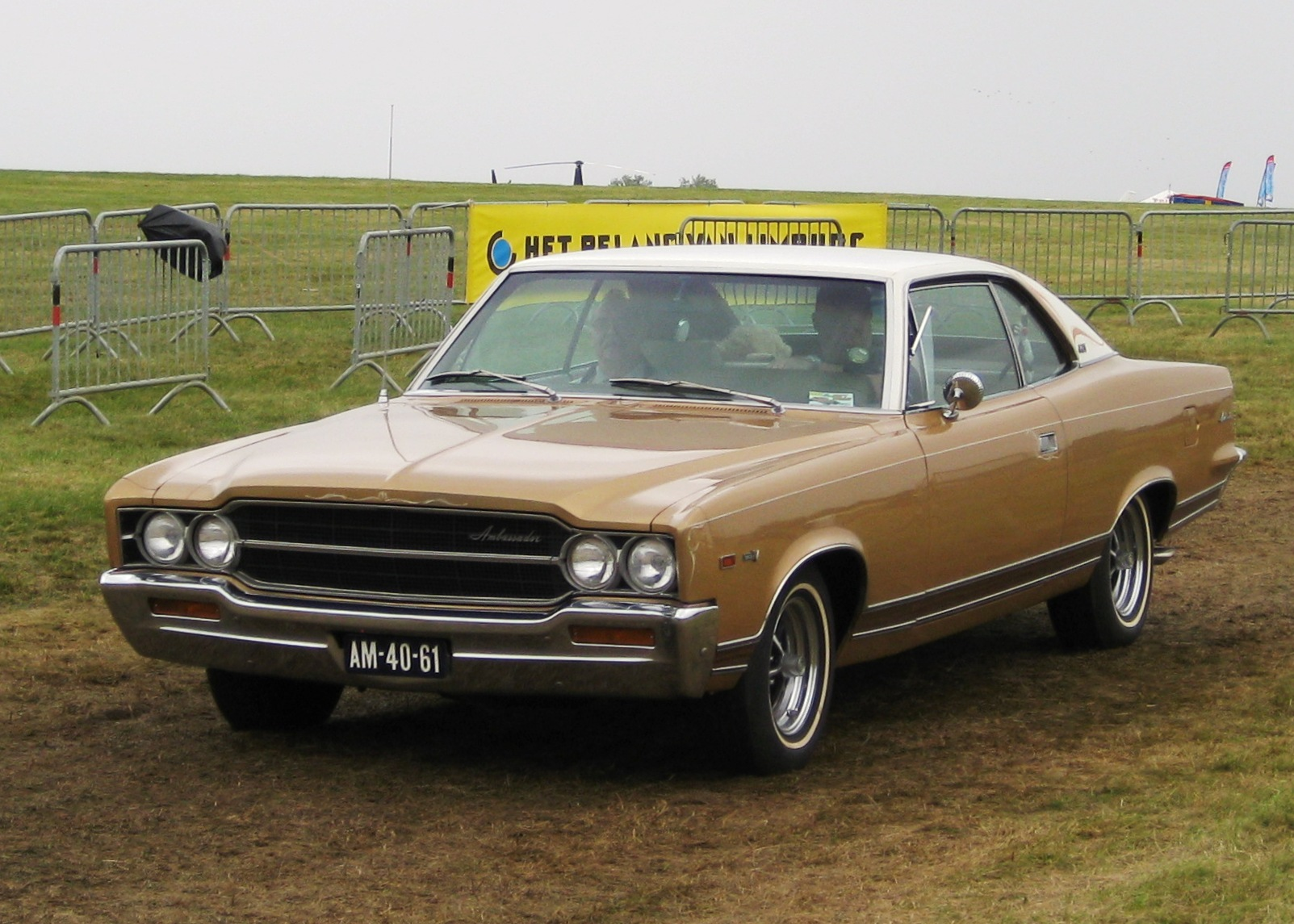
1969 Ambassador hardtop in Belgium

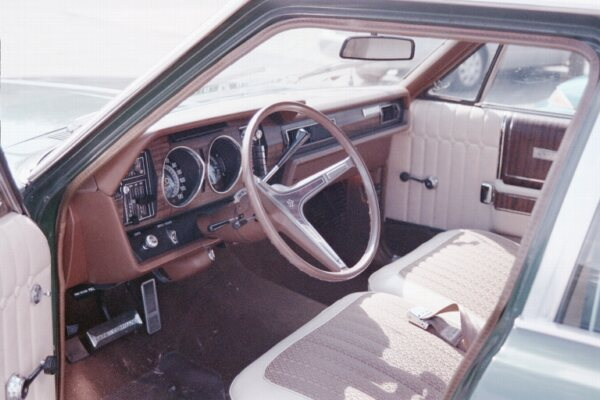
1969 Ambassador sedan standard interior

In 1969, the Ambassador received a major restyling, with a 4-inch (102 mm) gain in overall length and wheelbase. The 122-inch (3,099 mm) wheelbase was accompanied by an increase in front and rear track from 58.5 to 60 inches (1,486 to 1,524 mm). The front end appearance was revised with new quad headlight clusters mounted horizontally in a new molded plastic grille. The grille was blacked out, with a chrome horizontal bar connecting the headlight clusters. The hood was redesigned to accommodate the grille's raised center portion, and it faintly recalled Packard's classic grille/hood combination. Dick Teague, AMC's Vice President of Styling, had worked at the luxury car manufacturer before joining AMC. Parking lights were rectangular and mounted horizontally in recessed wells in the front bumper, just beneath each set of headlights. The entire front fascia leaned forward slightly to lend an air of forward motion to the car's appearance.

At the rear, ribbed rectangular taillights were mounted inboard the Ambassador's rearward-thrusting rear fenders. Square ribbed marker lights of similar height were mounted at the trailing edge of each fender side. The deck lid had a slightly higher lift-over for cargo access. The base and DPL models had no bright trim panel between the taillights, while the top-line SST versions featured a panel with a red finish to match the taillights. Station wagons saw vertical wraparound taillights replacing the previous "hooded" units, which were not visible from the side. The 1969 AMC Ambassador was a smooth, powerful, well-proportioned sedan that did not look like anything else on the road.

The interiors were upgraded, and a new deeply hooded dashboard clustered instruments and controls in front of the driver. There was an increased emphasis on luxury-type trim and features by buyers. The base model two-door hardtop Ambassador was no longer offered for the 1969 model year.

The 1969 Ambassador stressed luxury, with the marketing tagline developed by Mary Wells Lawrence at the Wells Rich Greene agency, tying the car's value, "It will remind you of the days when money really bought something." The combination of rich velour upholstery, individually adjustable reclining seats, standard air conditioning, and the longer wheelbase were highlighted in advertisements with Ambassador's posh"limousine" ride at an economical price. One aspect of this new advertising theme included many AMC dealers inviting prospective customers to call and request a "demonstration ride", in which a uniformed chauffeur would arrive at the prospect's home and drive them around in an Ambassador SST sedan. AMC's efforts worked, and Ambassador sales increased again.

==== Royale Stretch Limo ====
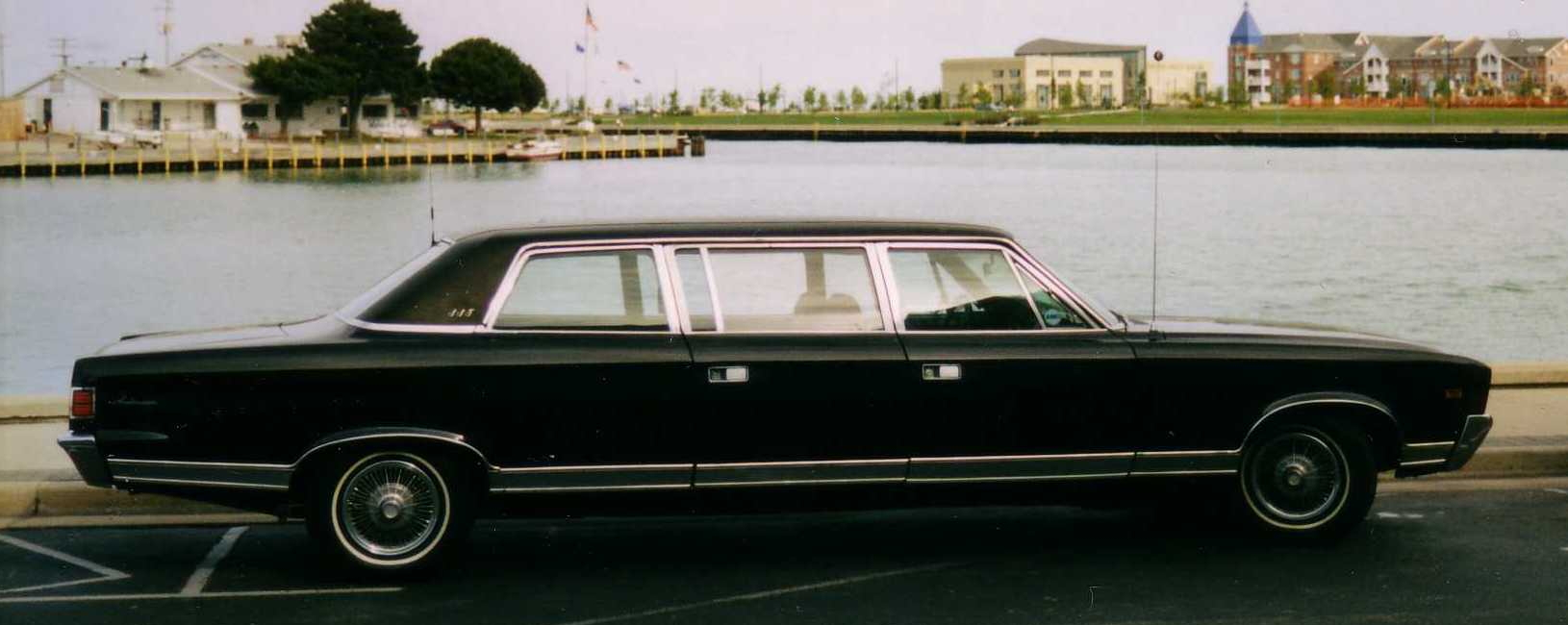
1969 Ambassador Royale Stretch Limo by Armbruster/Stageway

Not only did AMC promote the 1969 Ambassador as having a "limousine" ride and deluxe appointments, but Chicago auto leasing executive, Robert Estes, had the Armbruster/Stageway Company convert Ambassadors into real 24-foot (7.3 m) limousines riding on a 158-inch (4,013 mm) wheelbase. Known as the Royale Stretch Limo, one was owned by the State of Wisconsin as the official vehicle for Governor Warren Knowles. The conversions were unusual because they did not keep the stock rear doors—as is typical in most limos. The back doors were welded shut, and the Ambassadors were lengthened by inserting a section just behind the original B-pillar that had an entirely new central door in this center, making a large opening for entry and egress. Four-inch (100 mm) steel "I-beams" bridge the expanse created by the stretch. Power comes from the "AMX" 315 hp (235 kW; 319 PS) 390 cu in (6.4 L) V8 engine backed with the BorgWarner automatic transmission and a "Twin-Grip" limited-slip differential with 3.15 gears.

=== 1970 ===
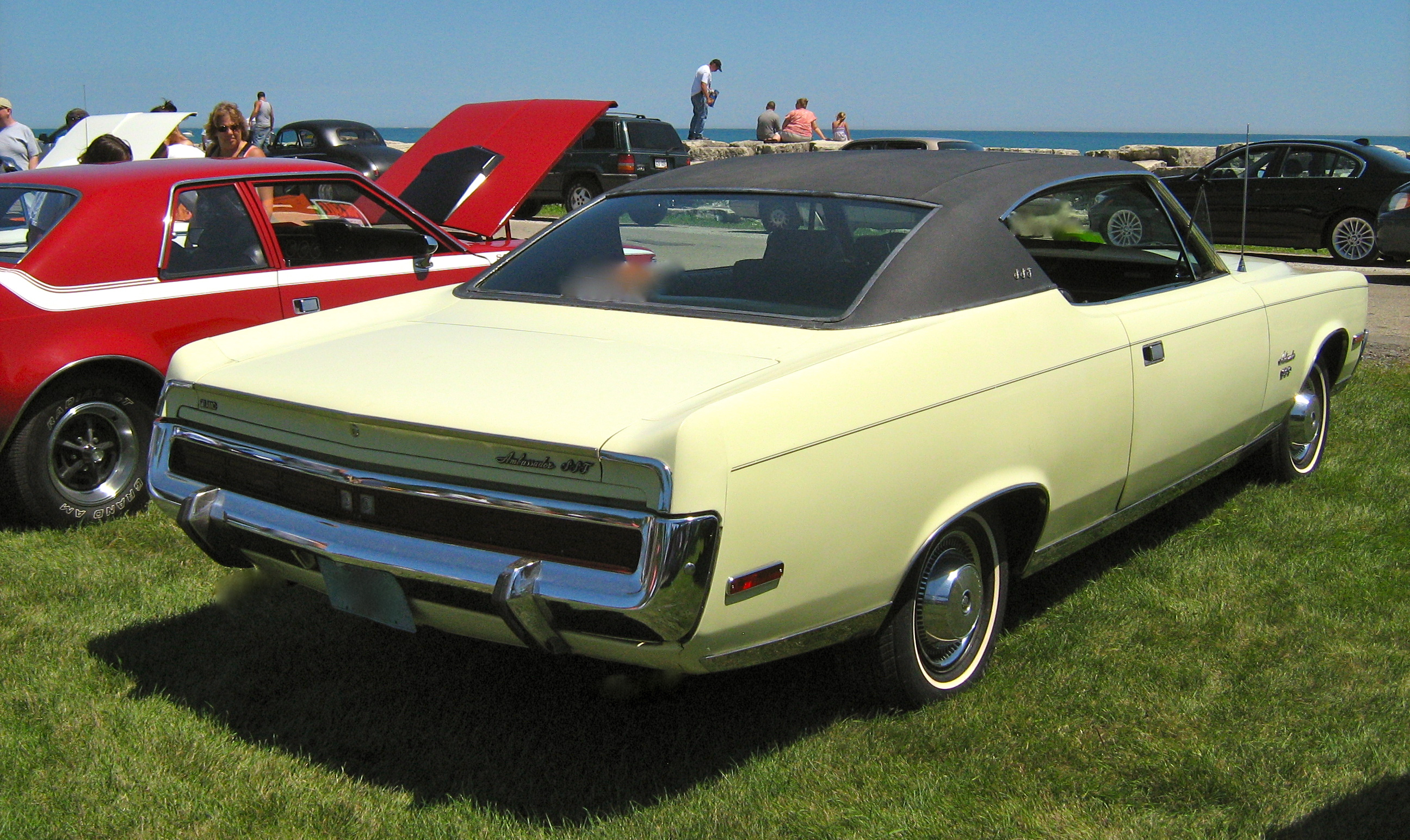
1970 Ambassador SST 2-door hardtop

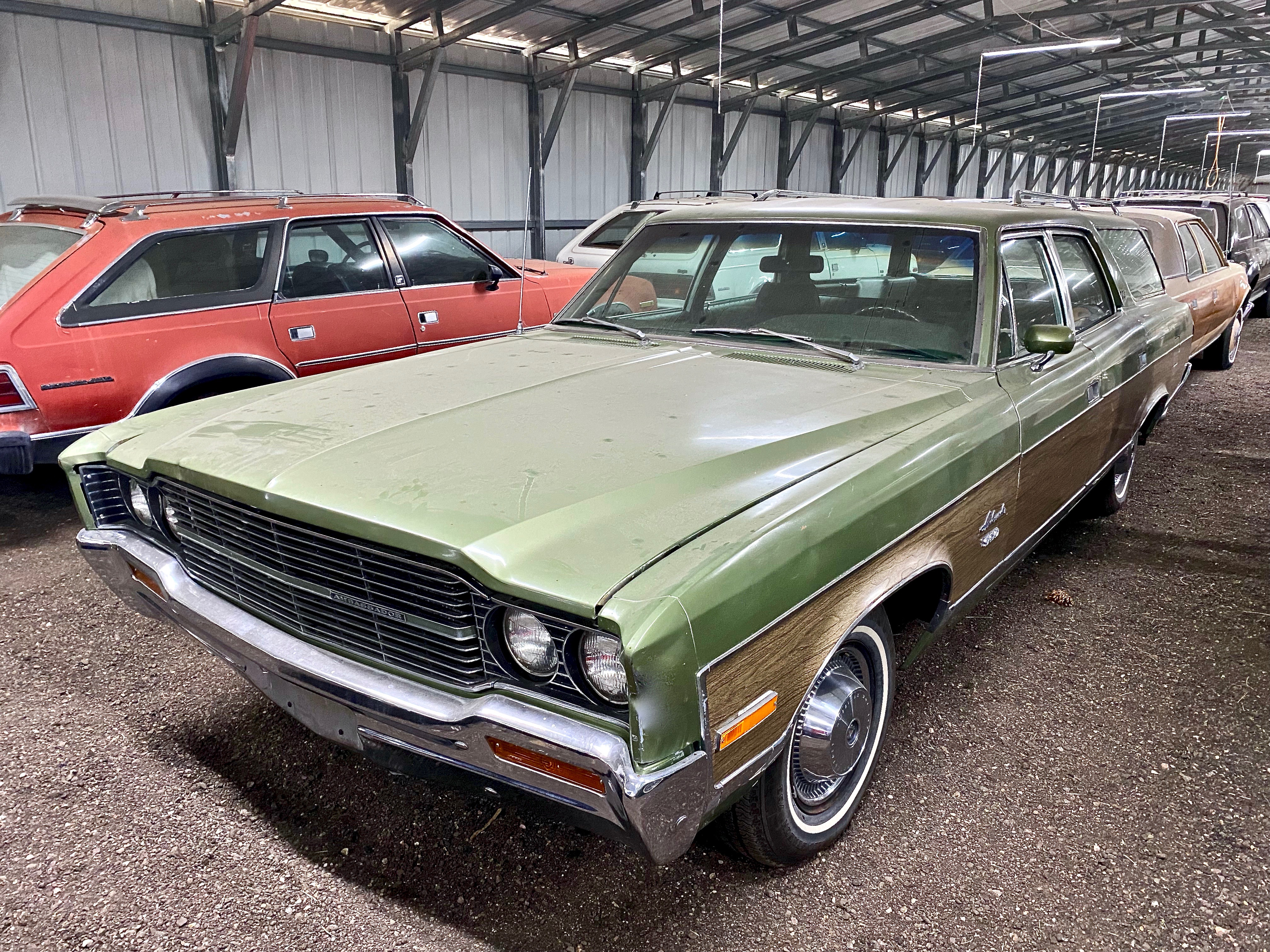
1970 Ambassador SST station wagon

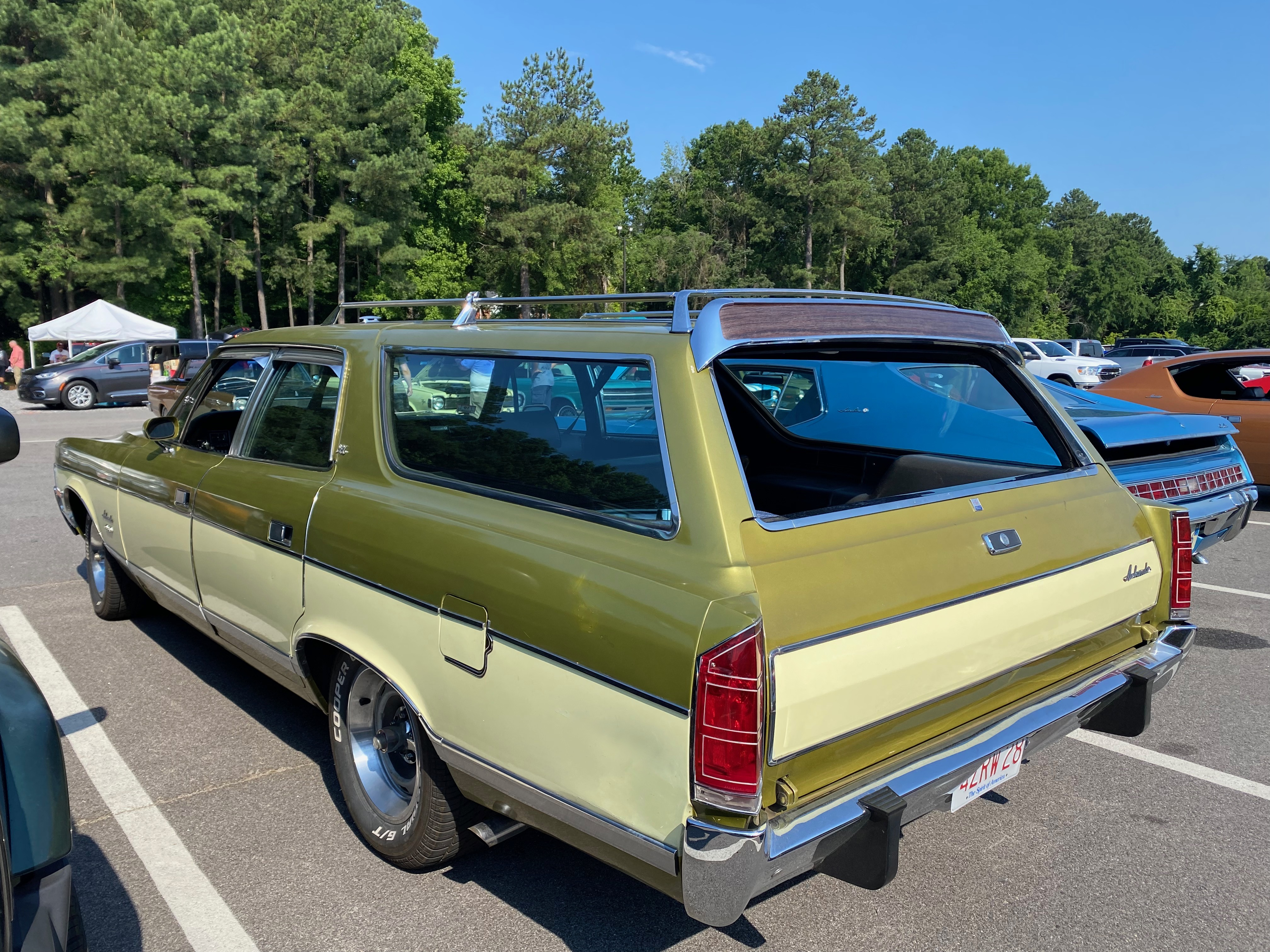
1970 AMC Ambassador DPL station wagon with optional two-tone paint trim

The most significant change by AMC for the 1970 model year was the launch of the new compact Hornet that not only replaced the Rambler American, but also became the platform for several types of vehicles through its discontinuation in 1988. However, all car lines received changes and updates for 1970.

The 1970 AMC Ambassadors were announced on 1 October 1969, featuring new rear end styling for the two-door hardtops and four-door sedans while the station wagons gained a new roof panel to accommodate a longer 6-foot (1,829 mm) luggage rack, which was standard. The luxury-positioned Ambassador continued to offer air conditioning as standard equipment. Model designations continued with the "SST" and the "DPL" while the fleet-oriented "Basic" version was offered only as a four-door sedan. The "basic" model was not available for export markets.

The two-door hardtops and four-door sedans featured a new design that was shared by the intermediate 1970 AMC Rebel. Restyling on the two-door versions consisted of a sloping roofline into the rear deck and broad C-pillars highlighted by upswept reverse-angle quarter windows. The beltline kicked up at the point where the hardtop's rear windows swept upward and tapered back to the fender end, meeting a new loop-type rear bumper with integrated rear lamps.

On the four-door sedans, the roofline featured slimmer C-pillars and squared-off rear door windows, meeting a beltline that kicked up beneath the trailing edge of each rear door window. The beltline tapered back to the same rear fascia as on the two-door hardtops. The rear bumper on the hardtops and sedans contained a new ribbed taillight lens that stretched wall-to-wall and included twin square white reverse light lenses in its center.

The station wagon's rear end was mostly unchanged from the 1969 versions. It included the dual-swing tailgate that could open down to extend even with the load bed or open like a door on its hinges on the left side, facilitating egress for the optional rear-facing third-row seat for two passengers. A power lift tailgate window was included with the three-row station wagons.

All Ambassadors received a new extruded aluminum grille at the front, featuring several widely spaced slim bright horizontal bars with one larger, body-colored filled horizontal bar extending to each headlight cluster. The Ambassador was available in fourteen exterior colors, 31 two-tone combinations (including the bodyside and tailgate on DPL station wagons, while SST included wood-grained vinyl exterior trim), and a vinyl roof cover in black, white, or blue was optional for DPL and SST hardtops and sedans. Interior choices included seats with coil springs and upscale brocade upholstery or available channeled velour in SST sedans. Standard on the Basic and DPL models was a non-reclining full-width front bench seat for three passengers. The SST included 50-50 individual reclining front seats. The two-door hardtop SST was available with high-back bucket seats in fabric or vinyl. They came with an armrest and a center cushion with the standard column-shifted automatic or optional center console-mounted shifter.

The 290 cu in (4.8 L) V8 was replaced for 1970 by a new 304 cu in (5.0 L) V8 engine. This 210 hp (157 kW; 213 PS) at 4400 rpm and 305 pound force-feet (414 N⋅m) of torque at 2800 rpm was the standard engine on all DPL and SST models. The 343 cu in (5.6 L) V8 was also supplanted by a 360 cu in (5.9 L) engine in either two-barrel, regular gasoline, or high-output, four-barrel, premium fuel versions. The four-barrel "AMX" 390 cu in (6.4 L) V8 engine was optional, producing 325 hp (242 kW; 330 PS) at 3200 rpm and 420 pound force-feet (569 N⋅m) of torque at 3200 rpm. Only the base model positioned as a fleet vehicle had a 232 cu in (3.8 L) I6 engine as standard. The three-speed automatic transmission was standard on Ambassador DPL and SST models.

New for the 1970 model year were two stripe whitewalls. The images of the Ambassador in AMC's 1970 marketing materials featured the new design replacing the previous single whitewall option. However, the dual white stripe tire popularity did not last long. Factory audio options included vertically instrument panel-mounted AM or AM/FM radios, as well as an additional eight-track stereo tape player for sedans and hardtops.

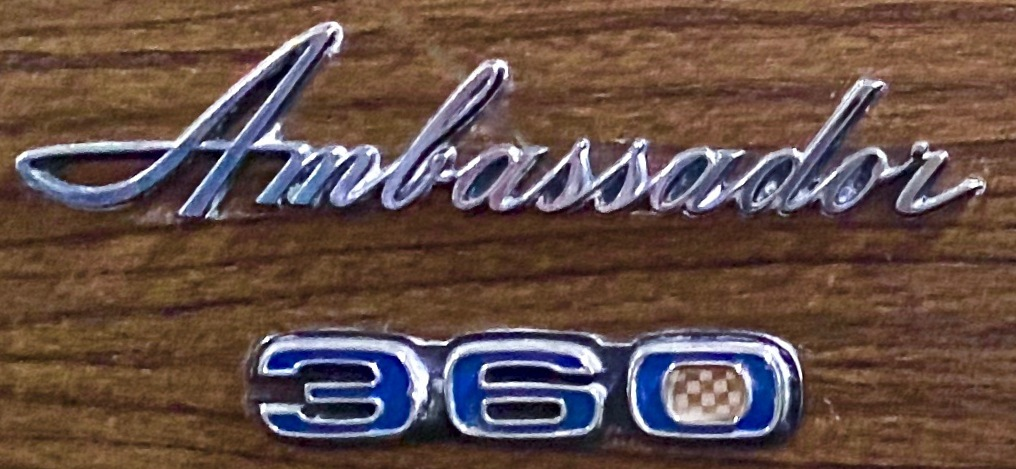

Marketing for the 1970 AMC Ambassador focused on it being a rich-looking car that was highly affordable. The promotion noted the Ambassador is AMC's finest car, like the Cadillac at General Motors, Lincoln Continental is Ford's, and Imperial is Chrysler's, but "about the size of their Impalas, Galaxies, and Furys" that were considered ordinary models at the time. The Ambassador, built on a 122 in (3,099 mm) wheelbase was compared to the final generation of Lincoln's Town Car 123.7 in (3,142 mm) wheelbase as sharing dimensions. The Ambassador, "though exceptionally well appointed, was comparatively inexpensive, A '70 SST, for example, ... $3,739 [two-door hardtop] - far less than an equivalent car from GM, Ford, or Chrysler."

American Motors marketing agency used innovative techniques such as comparative and "off-beat" ads as well as the heavy use of TV spots to emphasize exciting cars and a youthful image. Not yet well known at the time, Robert De Niro was featured in television advertisements as an accountant who just finished college and purchased a luxurious car. Little Italy, Manhattan, is featured as the backdrop and there are caricatures of Italian Americans. The advertisement resembles the setting of The Godfather, but was made two years before that film and four years before De Niro joined that film series.

An estimated 58,900 AMC Ambassadors were produced for the 1970 model year with an average MSRP of $3,677.

=== 1971 ===
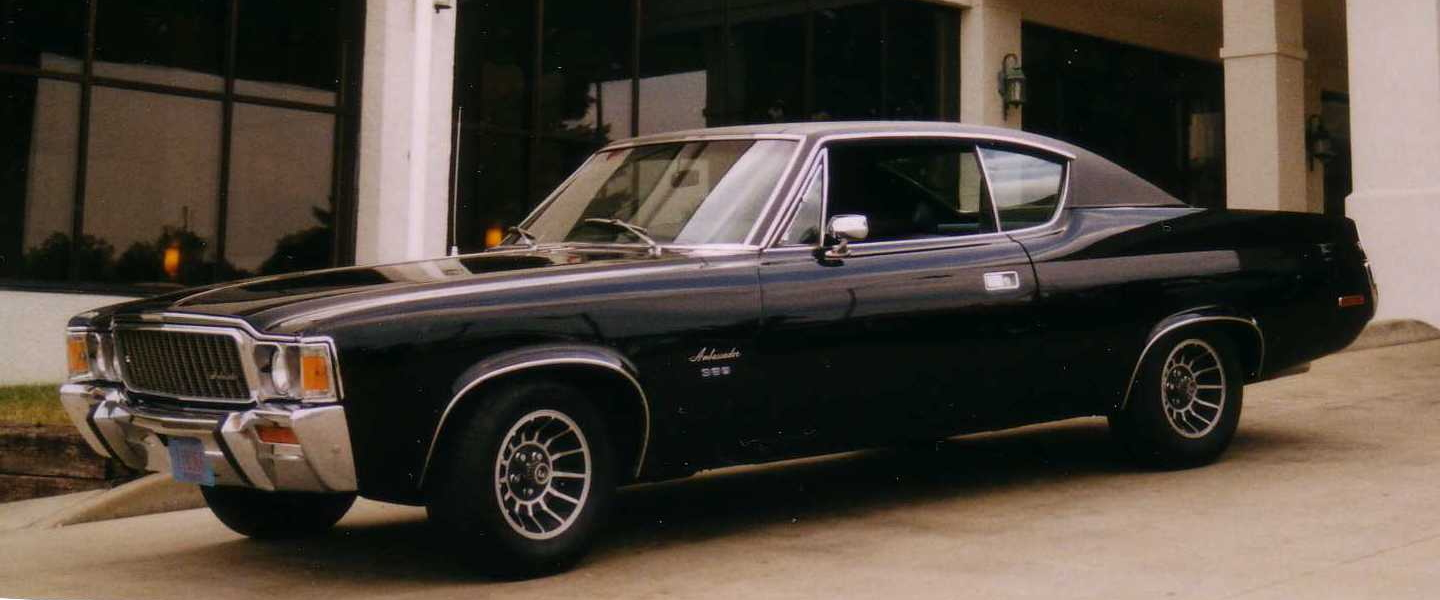
1971 Ambassador hardtop with TurboCast II wheels from 1979 to 1983

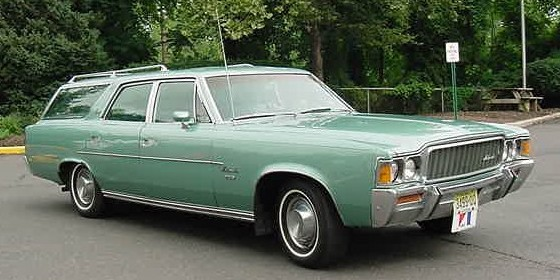
1971 AMC Ambassador SST station wagon

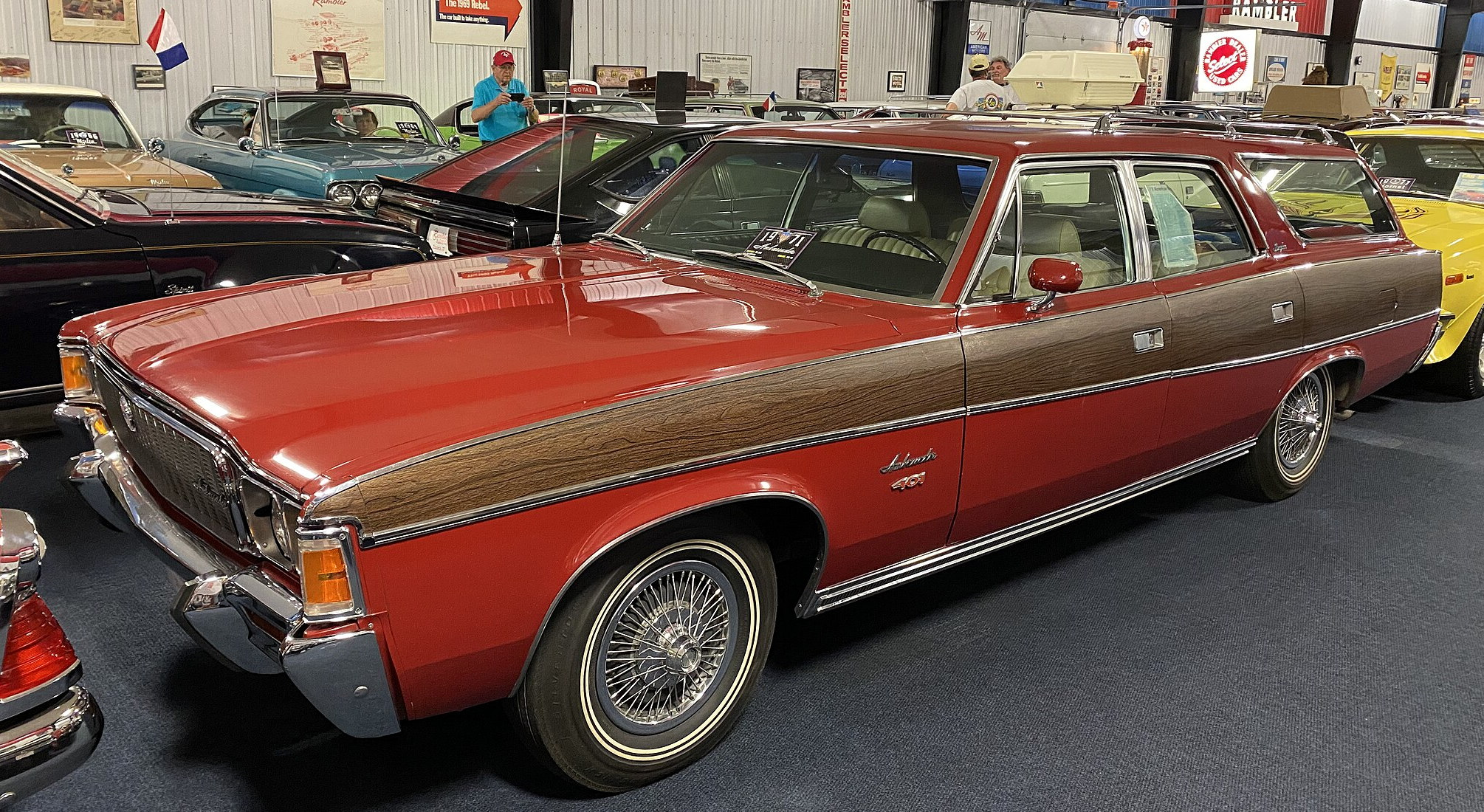
1971 AMC Ambassador Brougham station wagon

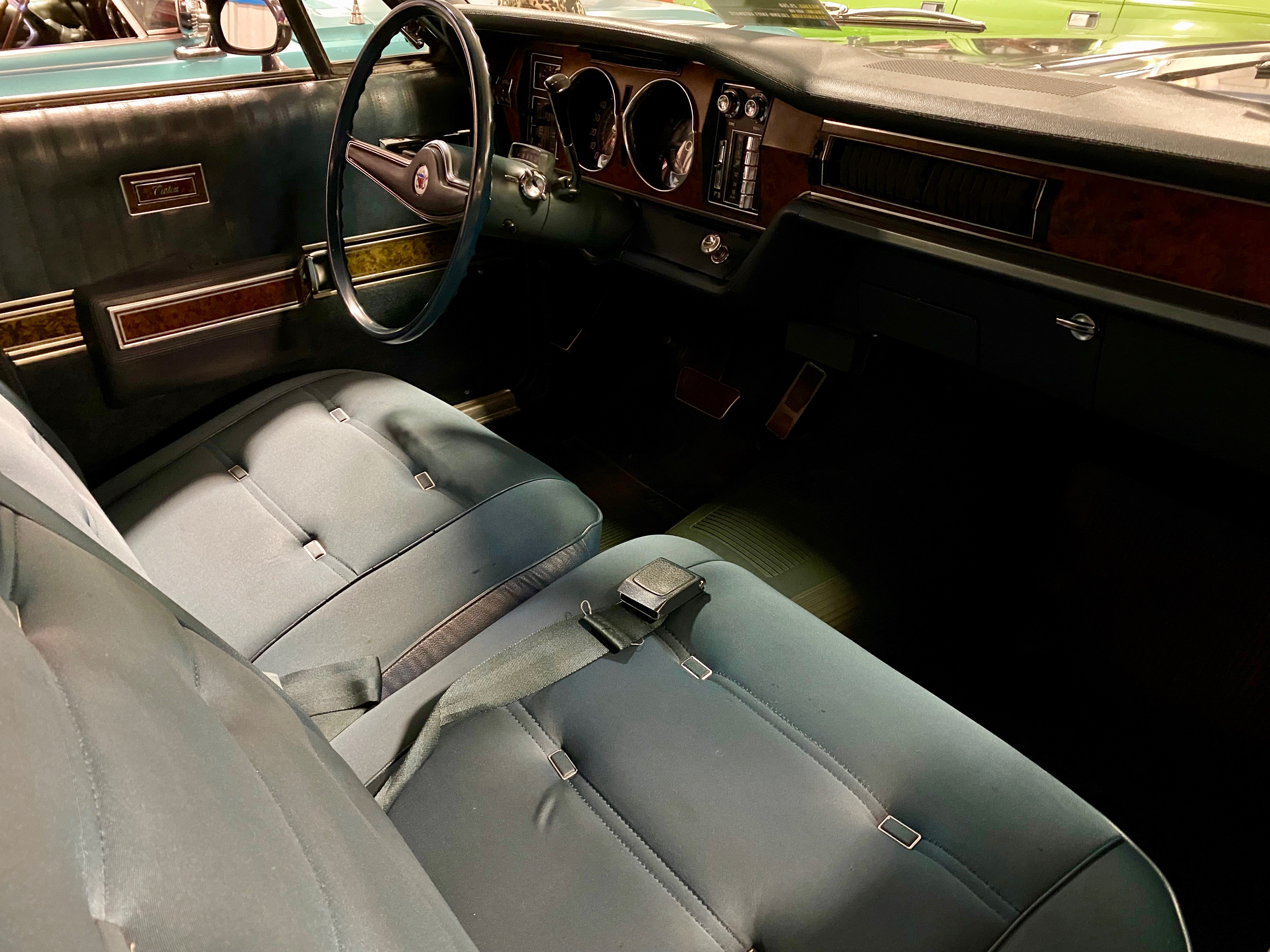
1971 Ambassador Brougham with optional "Custom" interior

The 1971 AMC Ambassador line of cars received minor changes following its major redesign in 1970. The marketing for the year adopted a "David vs. Goliath" theme, with the tagline asking, "If you had to compete with GM, Ford, and Chrysler, what would you do?" Mary Wells Lawrence, founder of the Wells, Rich, Greene marketing agency, was known for unconventional approach, and their work helped establish AMC's image as the underdog challenging the dominance of the domestic "Big Three" automakers. The agency "started running sassy, combative ads" to differentiate AMC's cars. One answer to this challenge was by AMC including an extensive list of standard features, advantages, and benefits to stand out against its larger competitors.

For the 1971 model year, AMC streamlined the Ambassador lineup. The previously unnamed base model was dropped, with the sedan-only DPL trim line taking its place as the entry-level offering. A new top-of-the-line Brougham trim was introduced, positioned above the mid-range SST models. The SST and Brougham were available in two-door hardtop, four-door sedan, and station wagon body styles.

Part of AMC's value proposition was including premium features as standard. All Ambassadors came equipped with a BorgWarner "Shift-Command" automatic transmission, removing the manual transmission option from the lineup. The DPL model featured AMC's new 258 cu in (4.2 L) I6 engine, rated at 150 hp (112 kW; 152 PS) with a seven-main bearing design for improved durability. The SST and Brougham models included the 304 cu in (5.0 L) V8 engine, rated at 210 hp (157 kW), as standard equipment. Optional engines included 360 cu in (5.9 L) V8 in a 8.5:1 compression model with a two-barrel carburetor using regular gasoline or a high-compression, four-barrel version that required premium fuel. The top engine option was a powerful new 401 cu in (6.6 L), 335 hp (250 kW) V8 that replaced the previous "AMX" 390 cu in (6.4 L) version.

The 1971 Ambassador's styling changes were concentrated on the front and rear of the vehicle. The front end featured a new distinctively styled grille with a bright surround with rounded edges. The headlights were housed in chrome pods that flanked the recessed "natural" cast pot metal grille insert with a bright vertical bar pattern. A second set of parking lights was integrated into the fender extension, a design change that eliminated the need for separate front marker lights and gave the car a cleaner look. The taillights on the two-door hardtops and four-door sedans remained a full-width, "wall-to-wall" design. However, the twin backup lights were repositioned from the center of the taillight cluster to a more outboard location. The station wagon received a new design for its optional woodgrain side trim, which flowed in a downward arc from the front fender, a styling cue reminiscent of the "sweep spear" on the Buick Skylark. The dual-hinged station wagon tailgate was standard and for added safety, the woodgrain trim on it was made reflective.

The Ambassador's durability made it a popular choice for fleet buyers. The base DPL sedan was offered various heavy-duty packages for police departments, taxicab companies, and government agencies. They were equipped with the more powerful 360 cu in (5.9 L) or 401 cu in (6.6 L) V8 engines for police cruisers and support vehicles.

1971 AMC Ambassador production	"DPL"	"SST"	"Brougham"
Four-door sedan	6,675	5,933	13,115
Station wagon		4,465	5,479
Two-door hardtop		1,428	4,579
Total = 41,674

=== 1972 ===
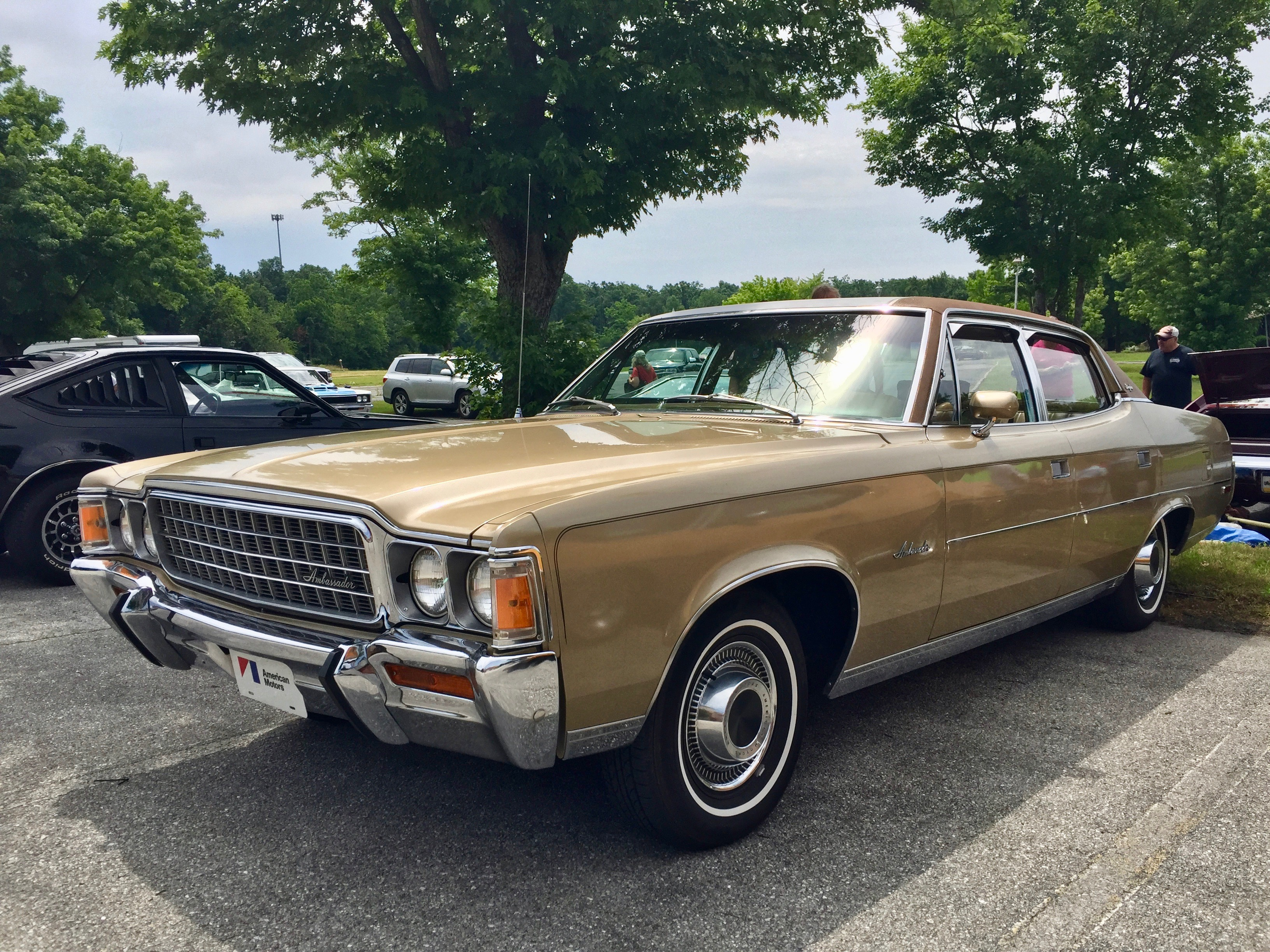
1972 Ambassador Brougham sedan

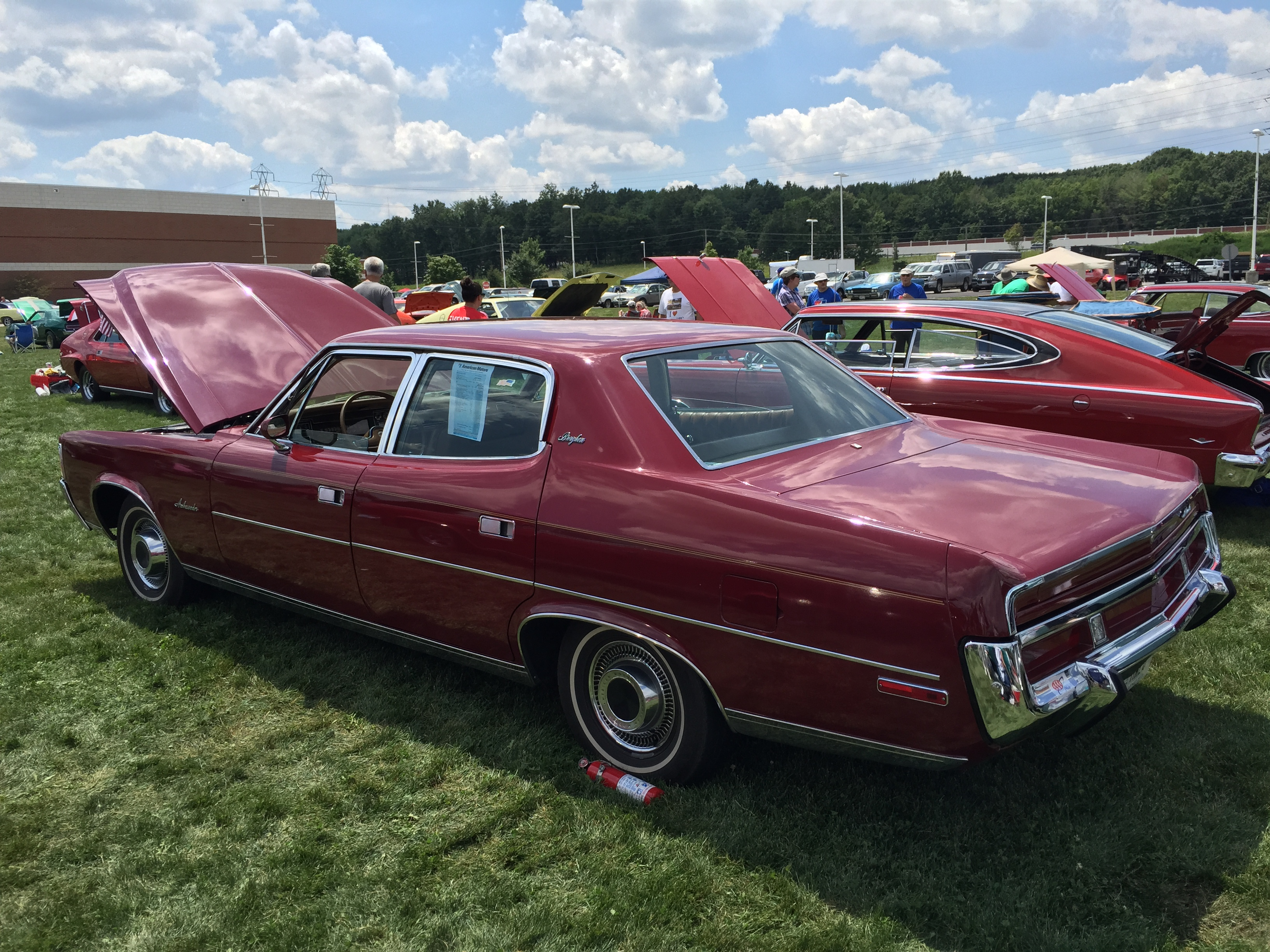
1972 Ambassador Brougham sedan

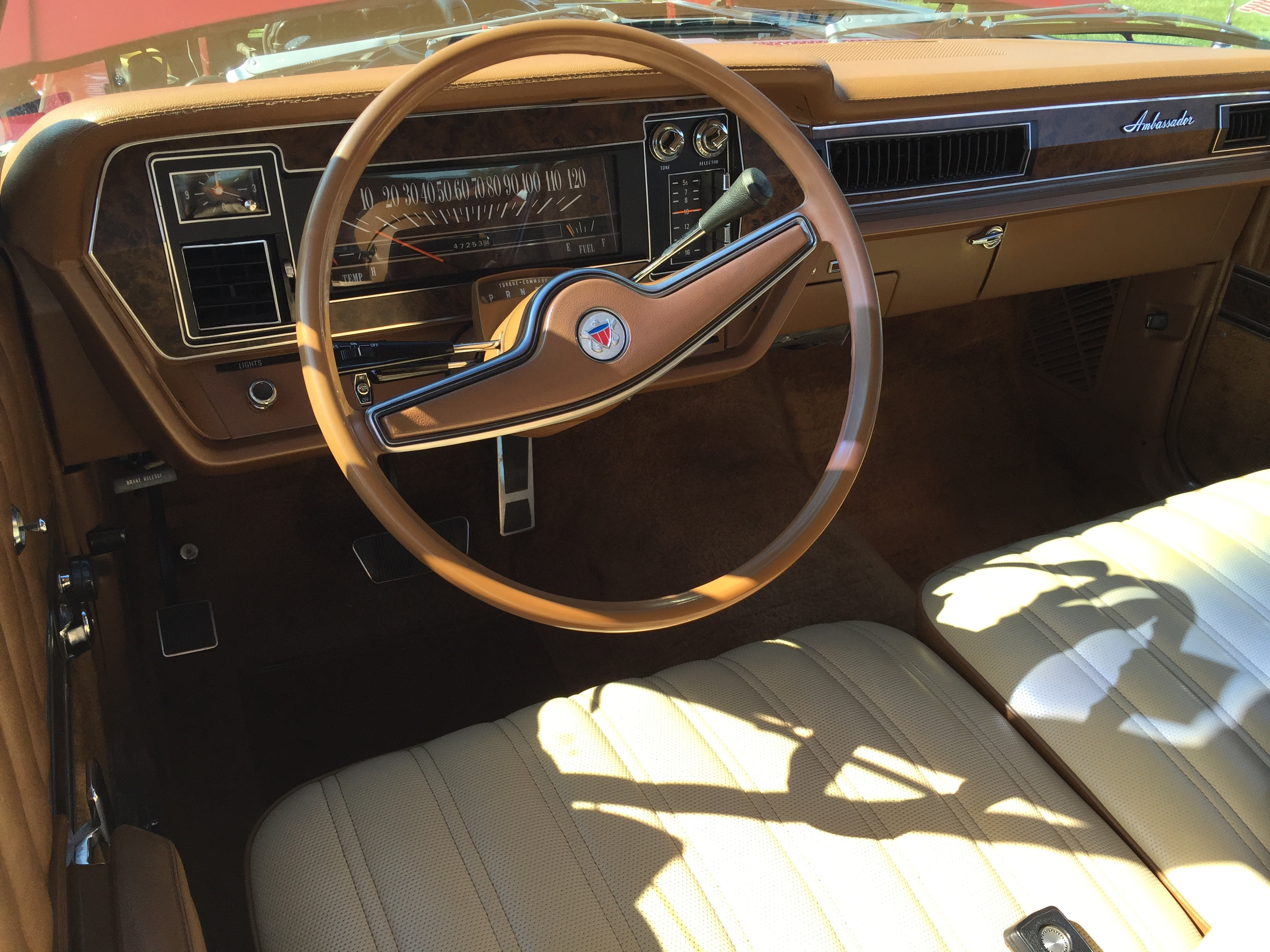
1972 Ambassador dashboard

Minor changes were incorporated in 1972 Ambassadors, as AMC's most significant news for the year was the addition of the innovative AMC Buyer Protection Plan, which included the industry's first 12-month or 12,000-mile (19,000 km) bumper-to-bumper warranty. This was the first time an automaker promised to repair anything wrong with the car (except for tires) and owners were provided with a toll-free telephone number to the company, as well as a complimentary loaner car if a warranty repair took overnight. This backing also included mechanical upgrades to increase durability and quality, such as the standardization of electric windshield wipers on all model lines, replacing AMC's vacuum-powered units, and better interior trims.

The base Ambassador DPL model was canceled, with three body styles now available in SST and Brougham trim. Fleet purchasers could order plain Ambassadors in Police Pursuit Vehicle (PPV) or Special Service Package (SSP) versions. A six-cylinder engine was no longer available; thus, the Ambassador became an exclusively V8-engined car for the first time since 1964. This made the Ambassador the only volume-produced American car that included air conditioning, power brakes, automatic transmission, and a V8 engine as standard equipment; all while being priced less than the Big Three's full-sized cars. The base engine was the 304 cu in (5.0 L) with two 360 cu in (5.9 L) or a 401 cu in (6.6 L) versions optional. The engines were designed to operate on regular-grade, low-lead, or unleaded types of gasoline. All were based on the engine designs responsible for AMC winning the 1971–1972 Trans-Am Series. The BorgWarner transmission was replaced by the "Torque-Command" (TorqueFlite) three-speed automatic sourced from Chrysler.

Styling changes on the 1972 Ambassador were minimal and consisted of a new crosshatch cast metal grille with bright trim and new integrated fender extension mounted side marker lamps on the front. Brougham station wagons now included a roof rack, rear air deflector, as well as 3M "Di-noc" woodgrain trim on body sides and tailgate.

A Popular Mechanics magazine survey after driving a total of 1,000,000 miles (1,609,344 km) found Ambassador owners were pleased with their cars, describing them to be "very comfortable to drive and ride in" with handling listed as a top "specific like" by half of the drivers. A very high percentage (92%) would buy one again. Although the Buyer Protection Plan was listed by only 8.5% as a reason to buy an Ambassador, owners valued the smaller AMC dealers that "had more time to be courteous and to pay personal attention to customers".

By focusing on quality, the smallest domestic automaker was profitable in 1972, earning US$30.2 million (the highest net profit achieved by AMC since 1964) on $4 billion in sales.

=== 1973 ===
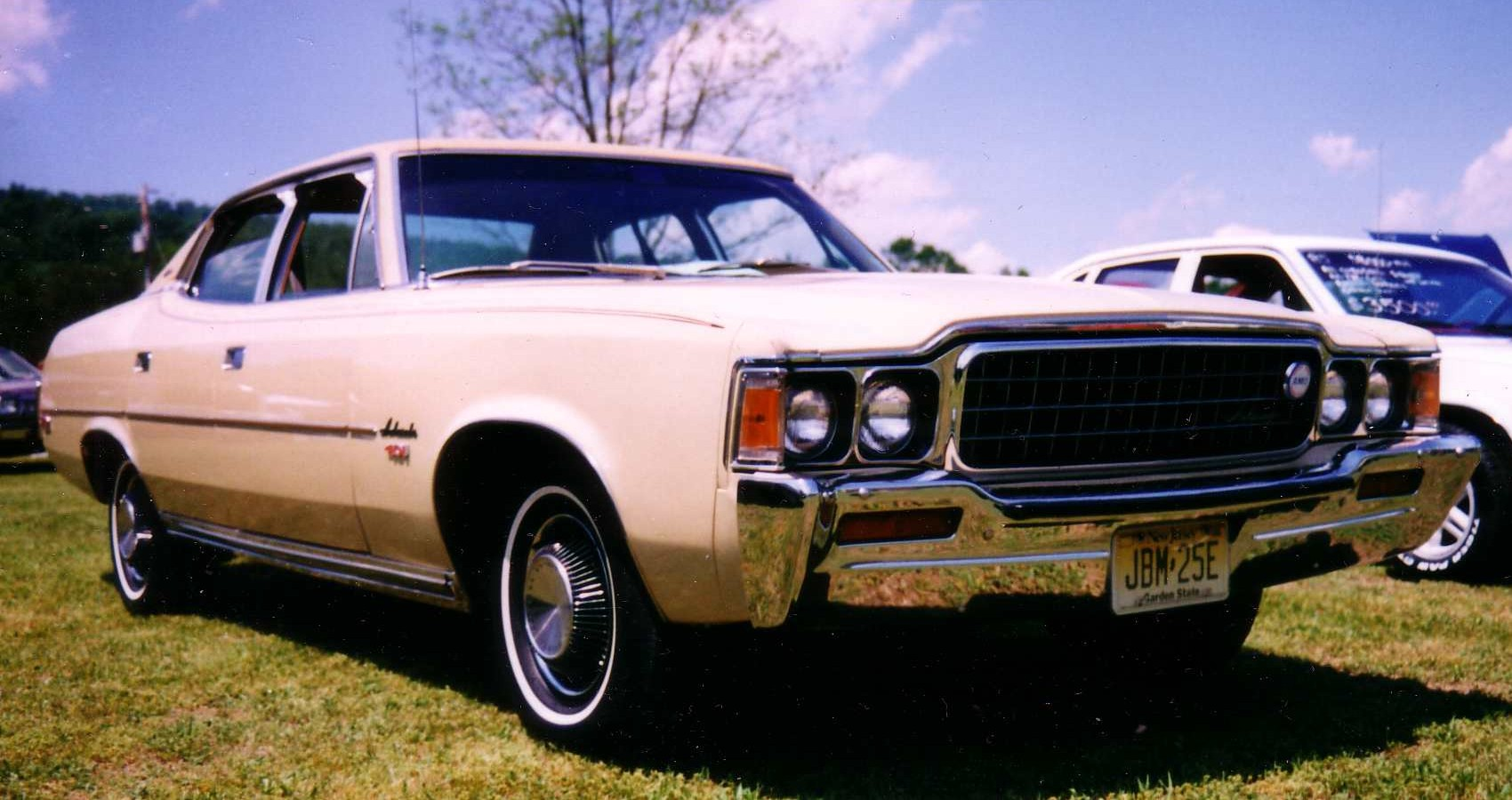
1973 Ambassador Brougham sedan with 401 cu in (6.6 L) V8

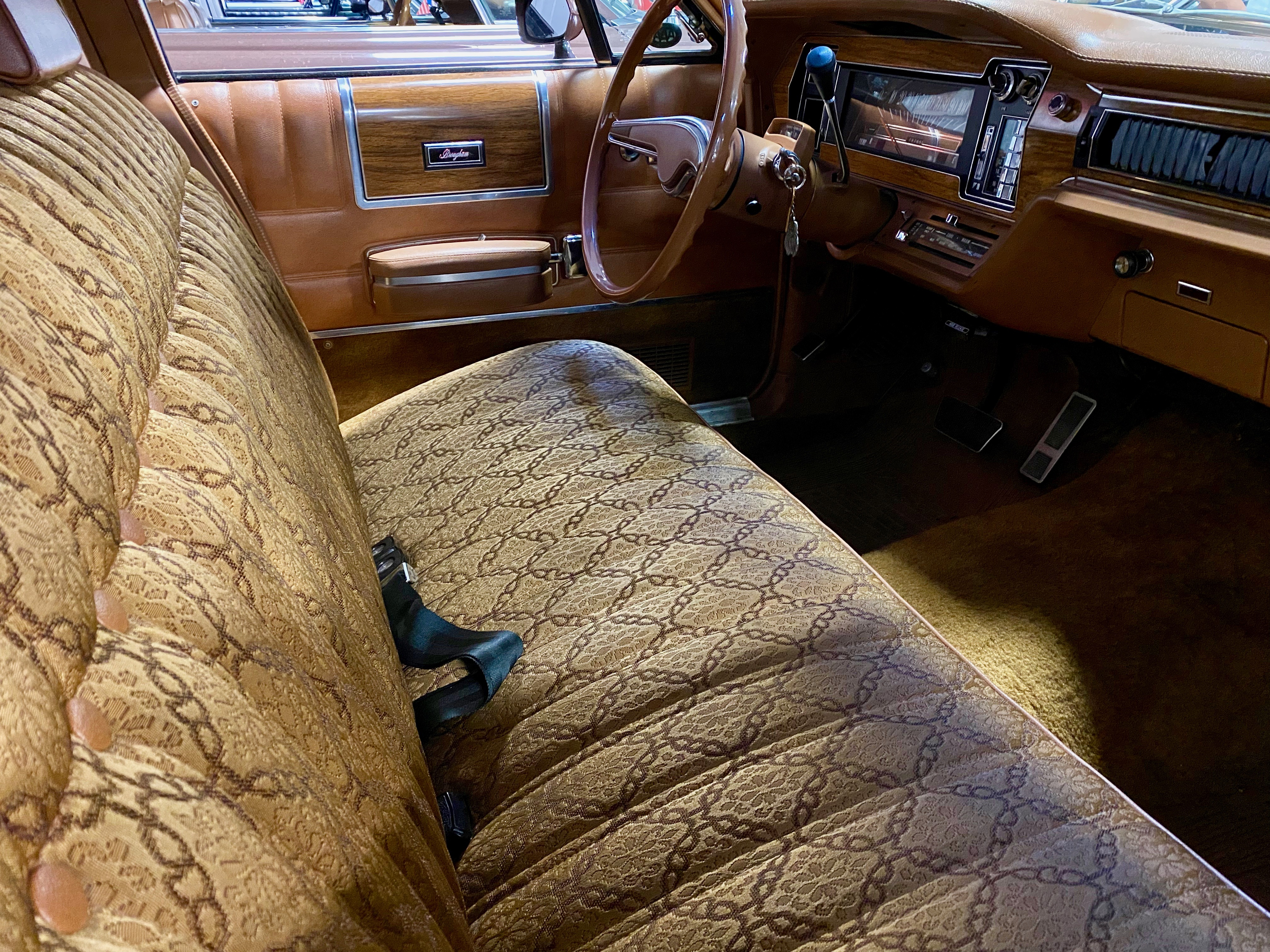
1973 Ambassador standard interior

The SST models were dropped from the line, as all 1973 Ambassadors now came in one high-level "Brougham" trim. Ten popular items, including an AM radio, power disc brakes, tinted glass, and whitewall tires were added to the already extensive standard equipment list that included air conditioning, V8 engine, and automatic transmission. The Ambassador line "maintains its reputation as one of the industry's most completely equipped cars". Multiple improvements in quality were designed to reinforce the new "Extended Buyer Protection Plan" exclusive to AMC cars that provided complete maintenance coverage for two years or 24,000 miles (38,624 km). The automaker's marketing campaign shifted to stress quality in a "we back them better because we build them better" advertising with particular emphasis into the Hornet, Matador and Gremlin promotion, while the Ambassador received individual support with the tagline "you get standard equipment, the luxuries you'd normally have to pay extra for."

In range rationalization to a single trim available in two-door hardtop, four-door sedan, and station wagon body versions, the styling changes for the 1973 Ambassadors were minimal. Heftier front and rear bumpers were included to comply with new U.S. National Highway Traffic Safety Administration (NHTSA) regulations that required all passenger cars to withstand a 5-mile-per-hour (8 km/h) front and a 2.5-mile-per-hour (4 km/h) rear impacts without damage to the engine, lights, and safety equipment. Ambassadors complied with the regulation by incorporating a stronger front bumper equipped with self-restoring telescoping shock absorbers. Designed to "give" as much as 3.5 in (89 mm), it jutted slightly forward from the front fascia and incorporated flexible trim matching the body paint. This bumper also featured a more prominent horizontal rubber guard at its upper portion near the grille, thus eliminating the need for a pair of vertical chrome bumper guards that were optional before. The grille gained heavier horizontal bars, and headlight bezels took on blackout trim in their recessed portions. The rear bumper gained vertical black rubber bumper guards, replacing a pair of similar and previously optional chrome bumper guards. The taillight panel on sedans and hardtops also got a blackout surround and now held four rectangular lenses each trimmed with a three-by-four grid overlay, the outer and inner lenses separated by the backup lamps and the two inner ones separated by the Ambassador eagle-and-shield emblem. Finally, the woodgrain paneling on station wagons was moved below the side moldings.

Model year production for AMC increased 25%, outperforming the industry average production increase by 75%, with only a slightly changed product in the showrooms.

== Eighth generation (1974) ==
Eighth generation
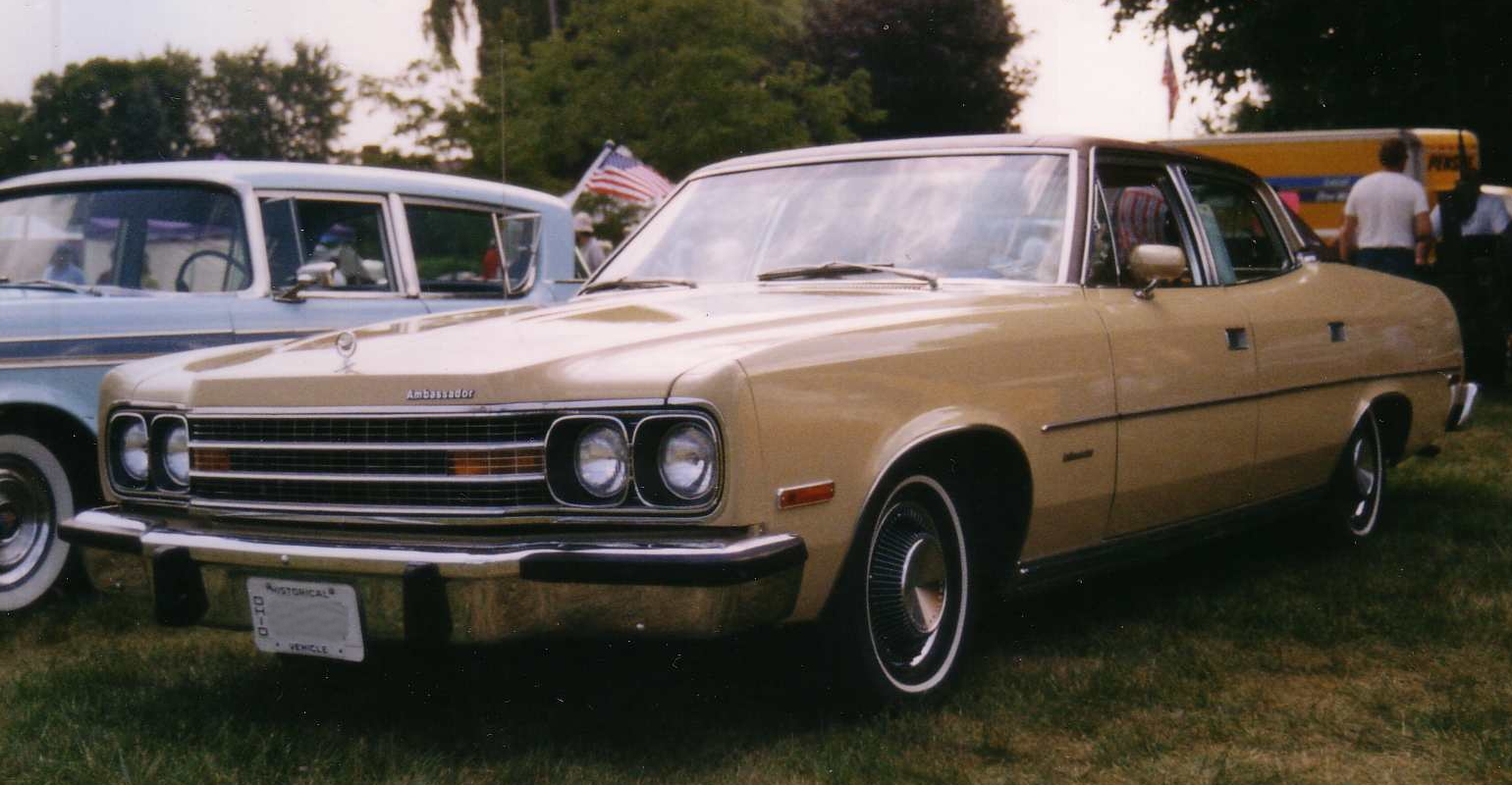
- 1974 Ambassador Brougham sedan

Overview
- Model years: 1974

Body and chassis
- Class: Full-size
- Body style: 4-door sedan; 4-door station wagon

Powertrain
- Engine: 304 cu in (5.0 L) V8; 360 cu in (5.9 L) V8; 401 cu in (6.6 L) V8
- Transmission: 3-speed Torque Command automatic

Dimensions
- Wheelbase: 122 in (3,099 mm)
- Length: 217.8 in (5,532 mm)

=== 1974 ===
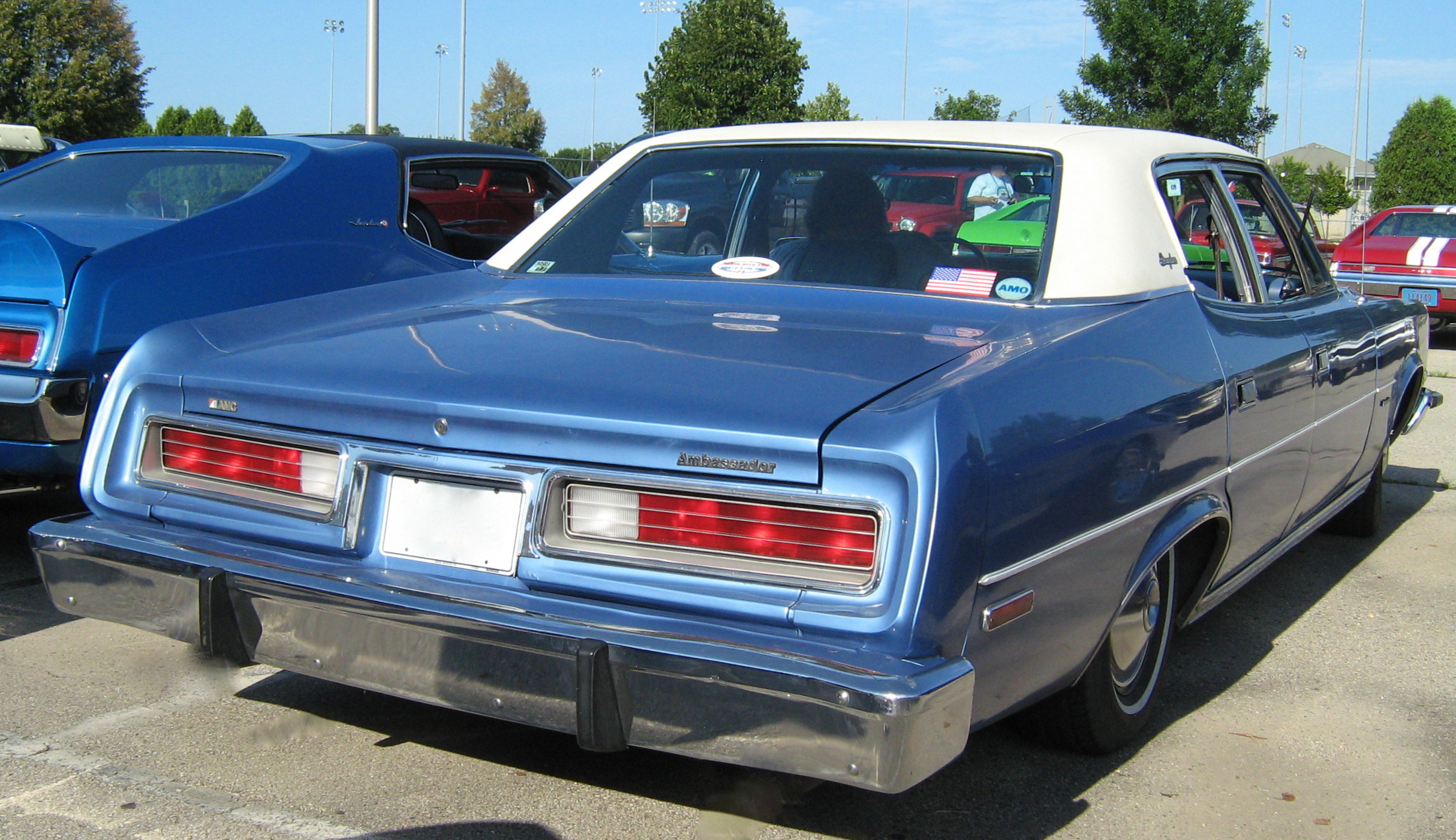
From the C-pillar back, the 1974 Matador and 1974 Ambassador sedan were similar

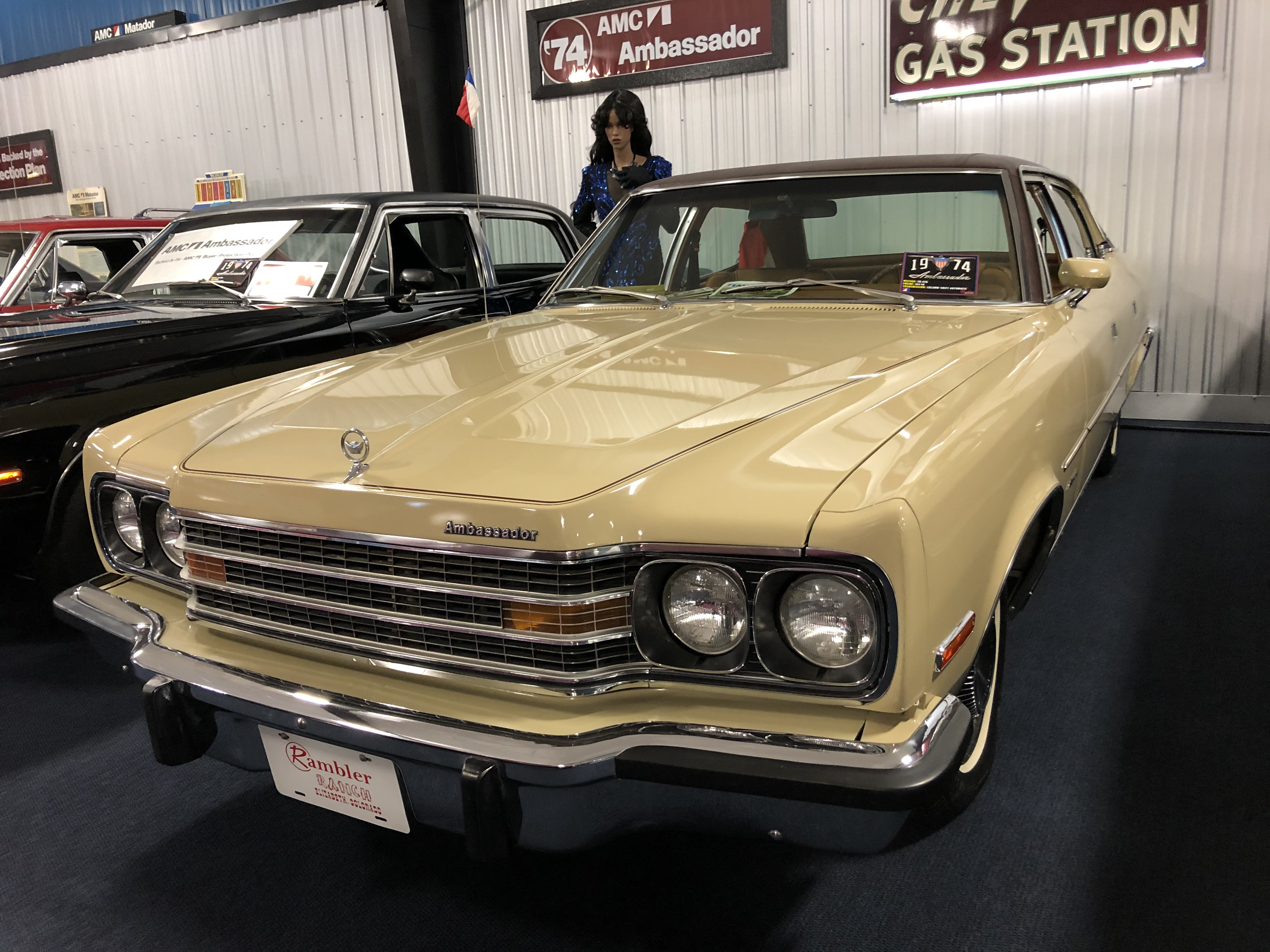
1974 AMC Ambassador sedan at the Rambler Ranch Museum

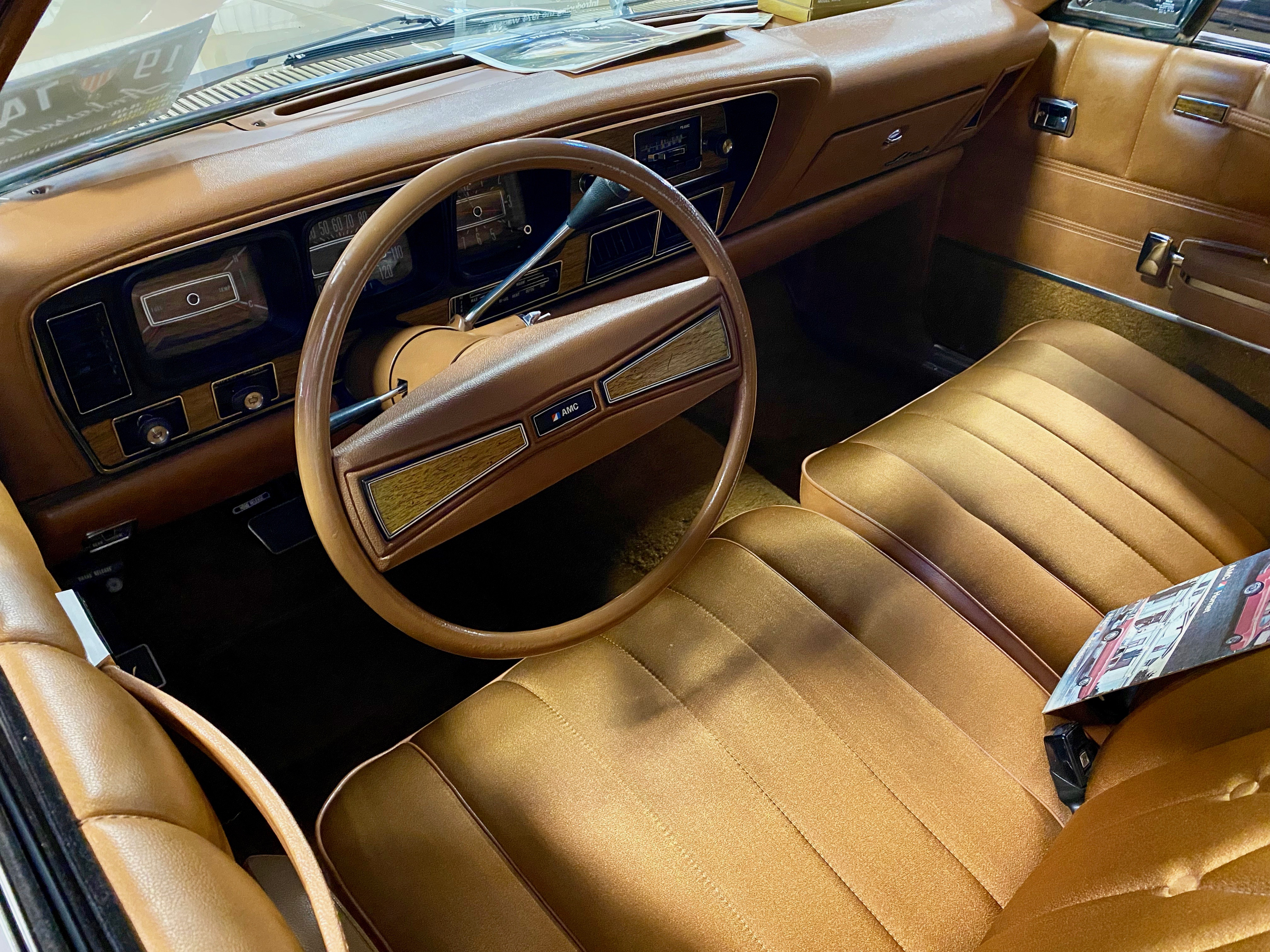
1974 AMC Ambassador interior

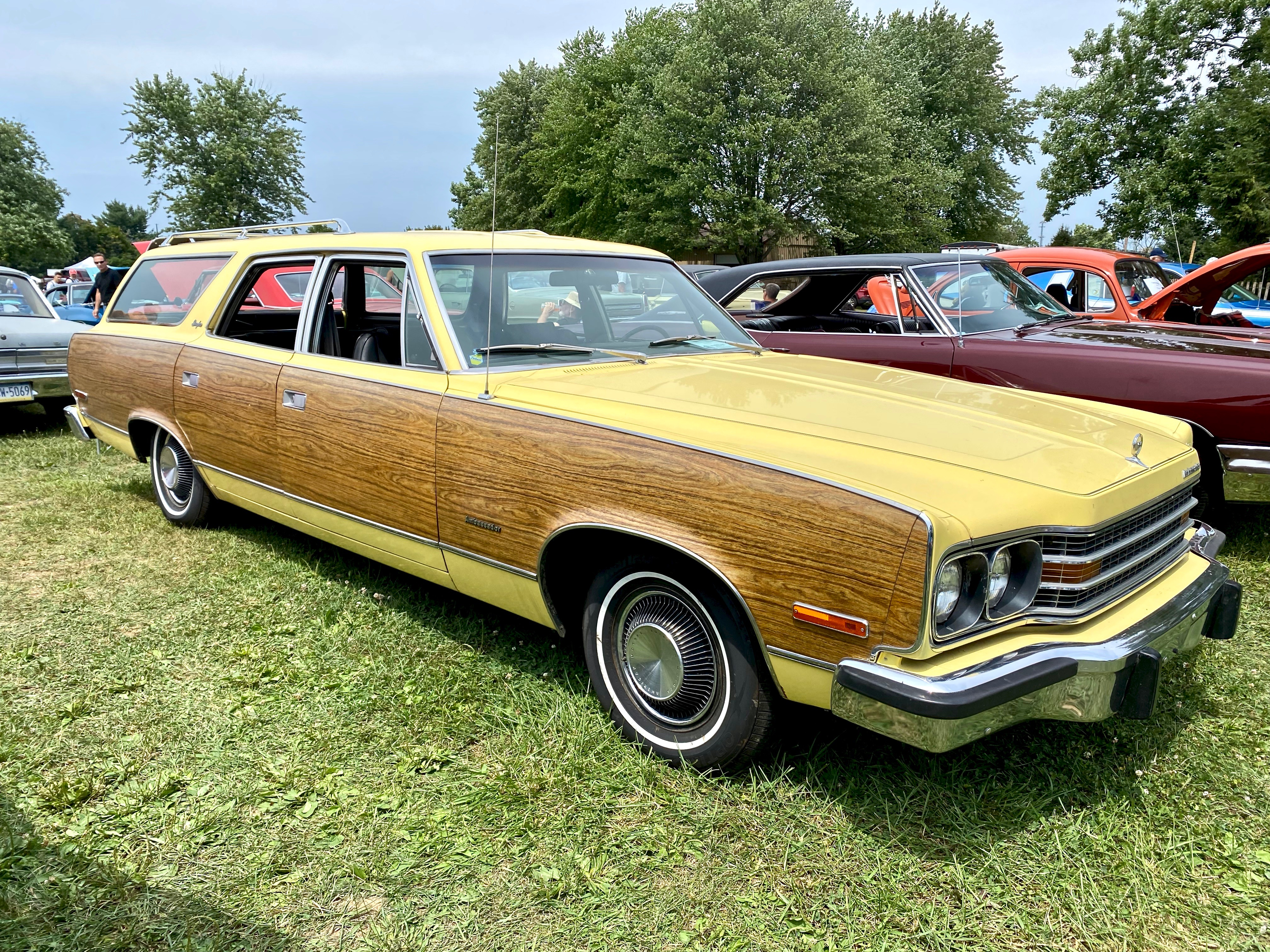
1974 Ambassador station wagon

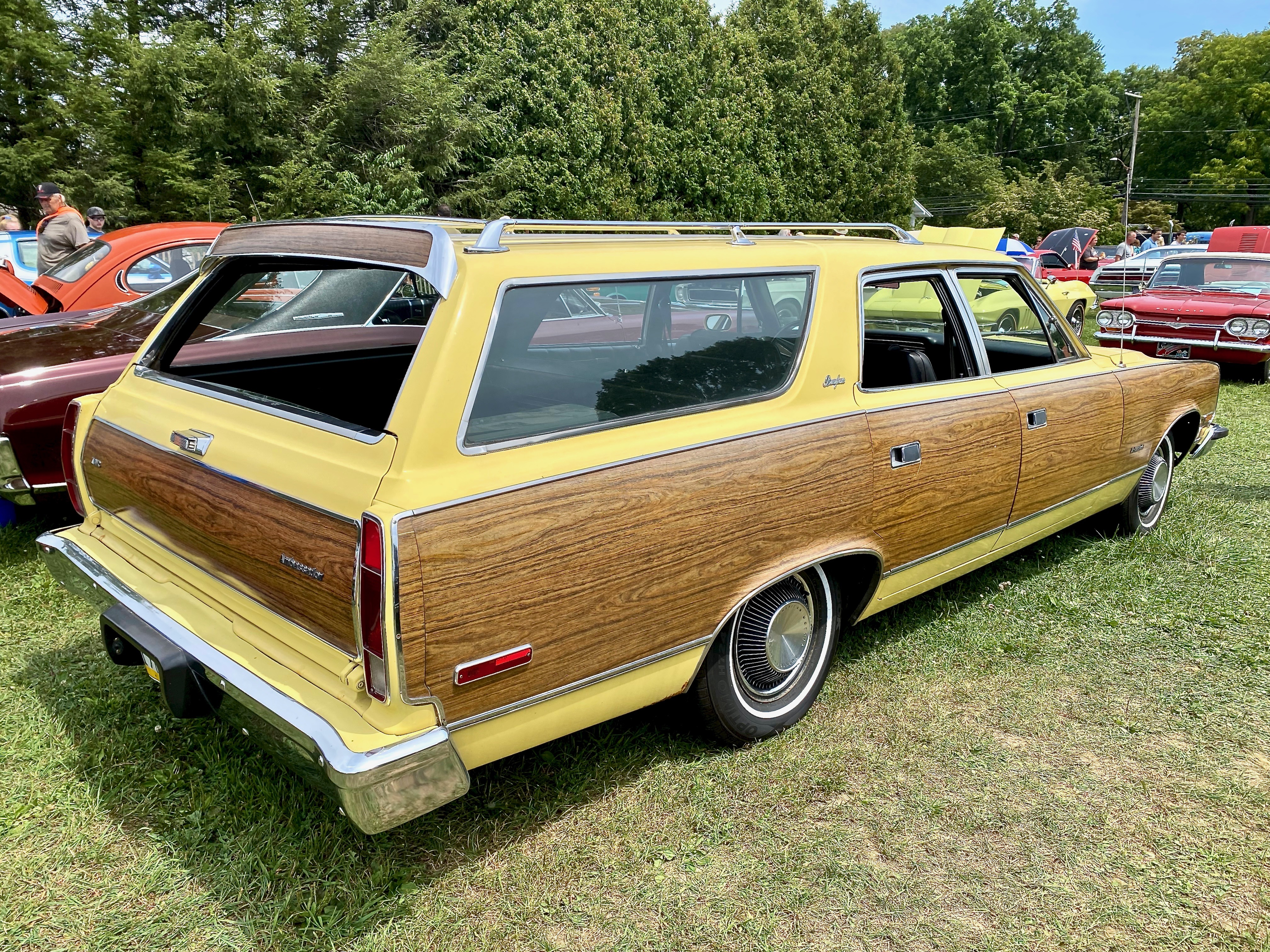
Ambassador wagon with "Di-noc" woodgrain trim

The 1974 model year AMC Ambassadors represented the eighth and final generation of AMC's flagship line, differing markedly in styling and interior finish from their 1970 through 1973 predecessors. This redesign occurred just as the 1973 oil crisis dramatically impacted the American automotive landscape, sparking nationwide gasoline rationing due to the oil embargo and a rapid shift in consumer preferences towards smaller, more fuel-efficient vehicles.

The 1974 Ambassador underwent a comprehensive restyling, becoming the longest AMC-built version at 217.8 in (5,532 mm). While retaining its previous 122 in (3,099 mm) wheelbase, the new styling was specifically engineered to accommodate the new federal energy-absorbing bumpers at both the front and rear. The Ambassador's overall length increased by 8.2-inch (208 mm) compared to its 1972 counterpart, the last year without bumper standards. This growth is partly attributed to its larger rear bumper and an unusually long front nose. Most full-sized competitor models saw significant increases, except for Chevrolet, which grew 2.8 in (71 mm) during the same period, as its previous bumpers were already pushed out from the bodywork.

The front end of the 1974 Ambassador sedan and wagon received an all-new hood, grille, and bumper. The grille featured a new squared-off loop-type design surrounding the circular, recessed quad headlights, with a distinctive forward-protruding center. The grille insert displayed a crosshatch pattern dominated by two thick horizontal bars that connected the headlight bezels. New amber parking lights were integrated between these bars, following the grille's protrusion forward and overlaid by its crosshatch trim. The headlamp bezels were again blacked out in their recessed areas. The new hood and front bumper followed the grille's central protrusion, giving the car a subtle "coffin nose" look. The contemporary Matador sedan received a similar frontal treatment in 1974, though with a much more pronounced effect and different single headlamp clusters, hood, and grille inserts.

At the rear, the new bumper was substantially larger and backed by shock absorbers, designed to comply with new National Highway Traffic Safety Administration (NHTSA) regulations requiring standardized front and rear bumpers to withstand a 5-mile-per-hour (8 km/h) impact without damage. On sedans, the rear fenders received fiberglass caps that wrapped inward, creating a recessed space for the carryover decklid. Within this space, new rectangular taillight housings were mounted, featuring taller white backup lights positioned inboard of the taillights. The license plate was relocated from the rear bumper to the area between these new taillight assemblies, with the entire taillight and license plate system on sedans encircled by a chrome trim loop. Both the Ambassador and Matador sedans shared this new rear-end styling. The station wagons' cargo area and rear design remained similar to previous Ambassadors, save for the massive new bumper and revised taillamps.

For 1974, the Ambassador Brougham lineup was simplified, no longer offering a two-door hardtop. This left only the four-door sedan and station wagon body styles. The cancellation of the hardtop was partly due to low sales of the previous Ambassador two-door models. Also, it coincided with the introduction of the all-new 1974 Matador coupe. The two-door featured a wide B-pillar, a distinctive long hood, and a short rear deck. Its design was lauded by Car and Driver as the "Best Styled Car of 1974" on the magazine cover, and the road test noted how it avoided typical mid-1970s styling hallmarks like imitation landau bars and opera lights.

All Ambassadors came in Brougham trim. The interiors featured luxurious upholstery and trim, including standard 50-50, individually adjustable, reclining front seats. The dashboard received an all-new instrument panel incorporating soft-plastic control knobs with international symbols. Standard "Abbington" fabric upholstery was featured on sedan bench seats, while ventilated woven vinyl trim was standard for wagon bench seats. Optional "Pavillion" fabric was available on individual reclining seats for sedan and station wagon, in black, green, blue, and cinnamon.

The Ambassador station wagon offered standard two-row bench seats for six passengers, with an optional rear-facing third row to accommodate eight seat-belted passengers. As standard equipment, wagons came with numerous practical, appearance, and comfort features, including a versatile two-way-opening tailgate (hinged at the bottom for loading or hauling long cargo, and hinged at the side to open like a door for easy entry/exit). Exterior trim included wood-grained semi-transparent vinyl side and rear panels, a full-length roof rack, and a chrome and wood-grain roof air deflector designed to help keep the tailgate window clean. Ordering the station wagon without the 3M "Di-noc" exterior body trim was possible.

Powertrain selections for 1974 remained consistent with 1973, with only V8 engines and automatic transmissions available. The standard engine was the 304 cu in (5.0 L), with the 360 cu in (5.9 L) and 401 cu in (6.6 L) V8s available. When ordered with a trailer package (which included a special wiring harness with heavy-duty flasher, heavy-duty engine cooling, a handling package, an automatic transmission auxiliary oil cooler, and adjustable air-shock rear suspension), the Ambassador was rated for a substantial 5,000-pound (2,268 kg) towing capacity.

Other mechanical enhancements for 1974 included a larger-capacity fuel tank, increased to 24.9 US gal (94 L; 21 imp gal) for sedans (wagons continued with 17.5 US gal (66 L; 15 imp gal)), and a 62-ampere alternator. New sound insulation was added, making the Ambassador even quieter. All 1974 Ambassadors came with a lengthy list of standard equipment typically optional on competing makes, underscoring its flagship status. These included comfort items such as air conditioning, an AM radio, and a vanity mirror, as well as appearance enhancements like pin striping and whitewall tires. Standard safety features included power steering and power front disc brakes.

The 1974 model year proved challenging for all full-size vehicles in the American market, regardless of the automaker, as the 1973 oil crisis triggered a significant shift in consumer focus towards smaller, more fuel-efficient cars. The overall full-sized, low-priced market segment experienced a sharp 37% drop in sales.

At the same time, AMC was facing increasing demand for its smaller-sized Gremlin and Hornet models, and the automaker was struggling to keep up with production of these more economical cars by 1974. The company was also preparing for the highly anticipated introduction of the Pacer. American Motors decided to discontinue the Ambassador (as well as the Javelin in the shrinking pony car segment) after the 1974 model year to simplify production lines by reducing the number of different models. In June 1974, the final AMC Ambassador rolled off the Kenosha, Wisconsin assembly line. This marked the end of a nameplate that had been in continuous production in some form for 48 years.

Total production for the 1974 Ambassador consisted of 17,901 sedans and 7,070 station wagons, for a combined total of 24,971 Ambassadors during its final model year.

== International assembly ==
=== Argentina ===
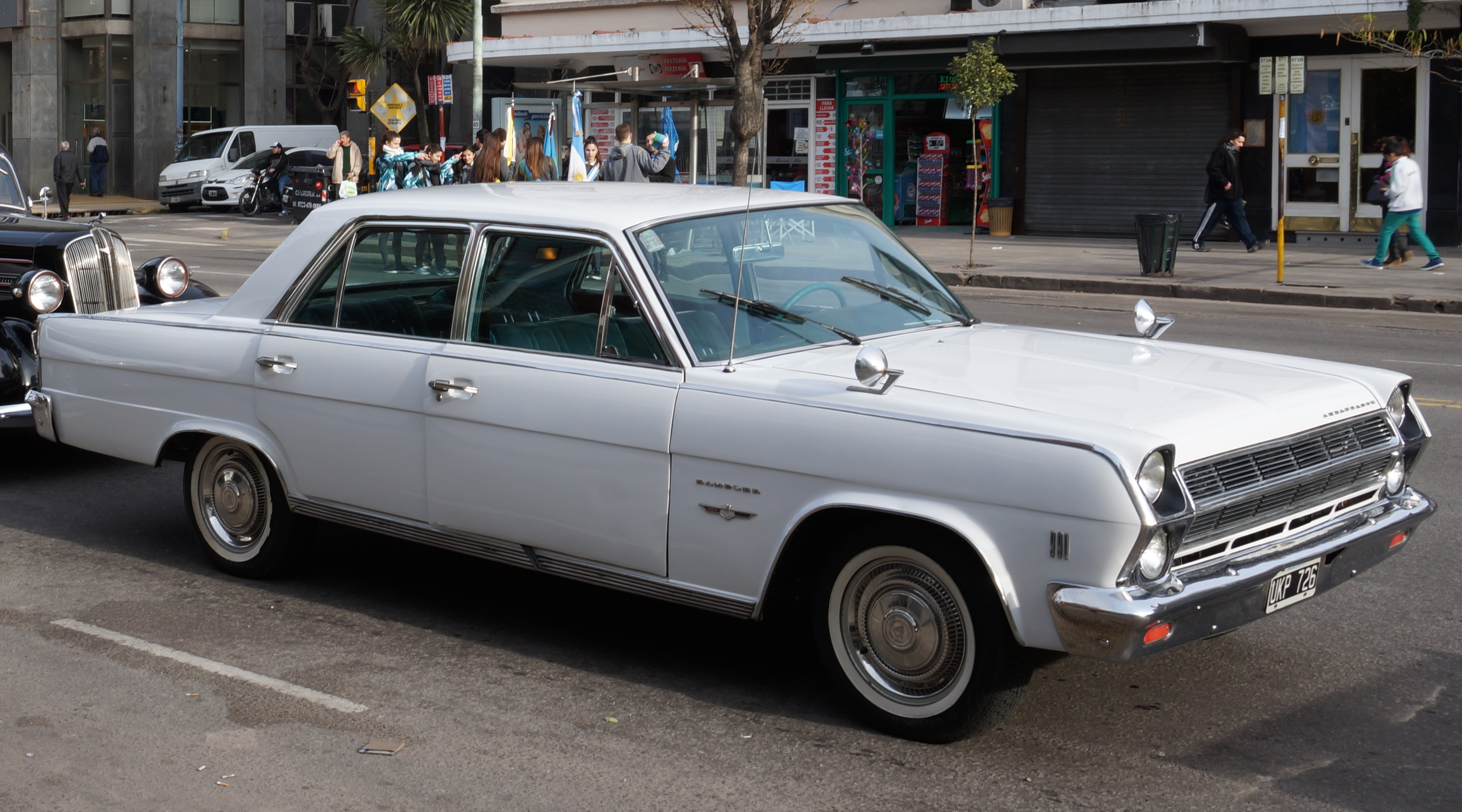
Fifth U.S. generation Ambassador 990 built by IKA from 1965 through 1972

Industrias Kaiser Argentina (IKA) produced the U.S. third, fourth, and fifth generation Ambassadors in Córdoba, Argentina from 1962 until 1972, and later became available by special order through 1975. Despite being replaced by AMC in 1967, IKA continued to use the old platform until the end of production in Argentina. As with all export markets, the cars were marketed as "Rambler" even after the name change in the United States.

Assembly of IKA Ramblers began in 1962, with the Argentinean cars being the 1961 U.S. versions, but equipped with 226 cu in (3.70 L) Continental I6 engines producing 119 hp (89 kW; 121 PS) at 4000 rpm, along with a steering column-mounted manual three-speed transmission. The Ambassador 440 was the top-trim IKA model available only as a four-door sedan.

The completely new generation models by AMC in the U.S. for the 1963 model year were also replicated by IKA. The Ambassador sedan came exclusively in 990 trim, and it revolutionized the Argentine automotive market by introducing innovations that included power steering, power windows, and factory-installed air conditioning.

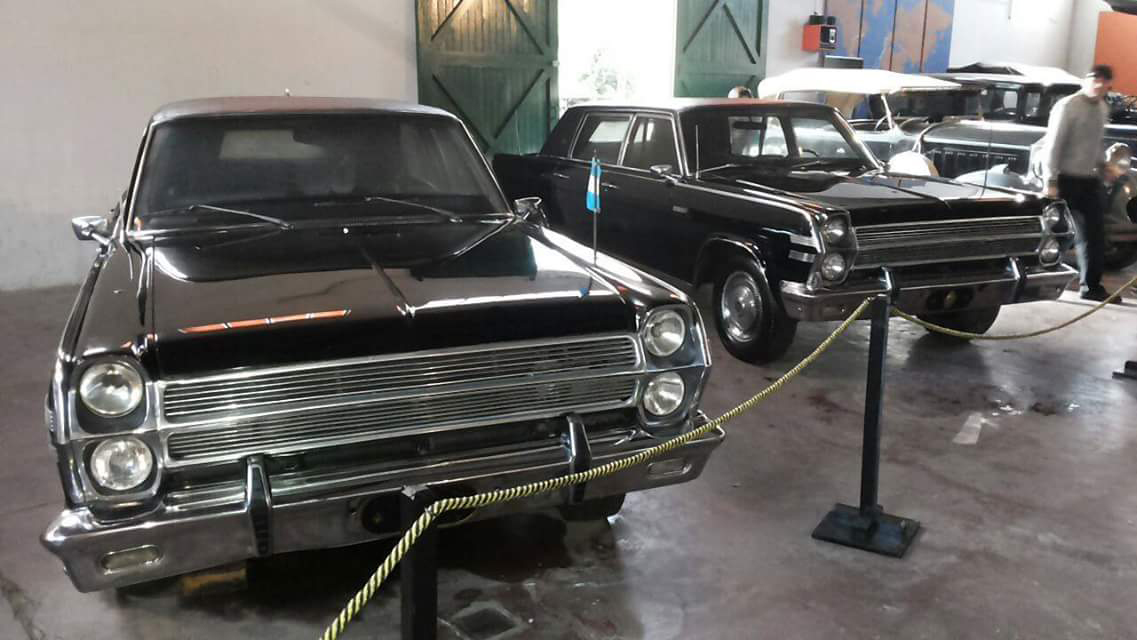
Presidential Rambler Ambassadors, produced in 1968 by IKA

The Ambassador line was redesigned for 1965 in the U.S., as well as for Argentina. All IKA Rambler models now featured the 230.5 cu in (3.78 L) overhead camshaft (OHC) straight-six "Tornado Interceptor" engines producing 145 hp (108 kW; 147 PS) at 4200 rpm. They were originally developed by Kaiser Motors in the U.S. for the 1963 Jeep Gladiator pickups and Wagoneer vehicles. The engine was now produced in Argentina, and it increased the domestic (locally sourced) content of IKA automobiles to lower taxes (tariffs).

The new IKA Ambassador 990 sedans were further upgraded to steering column-mounted ZF four-speed manual transmissions, front disc brakes, front reclining bucket seats with center cushion and armrest, as well as luxury features that included power windows and air conditioning. A road test by Revista Parabrisas magazine described the 1965 IKA Rambler Ambassador 990 as "soft, opulent, and smooth ride at all speeds... something big, luxurious and complete... the highest expression of comfort tested so far by the magazine".

Stretch versions of the IKA Rambler Ambassador were used as official government limousines. The "Presidential" models featured a longer rear door and side window, as well as broader C-pillar with padded vinyl roof cover and a small rear window.

=== Australia ===
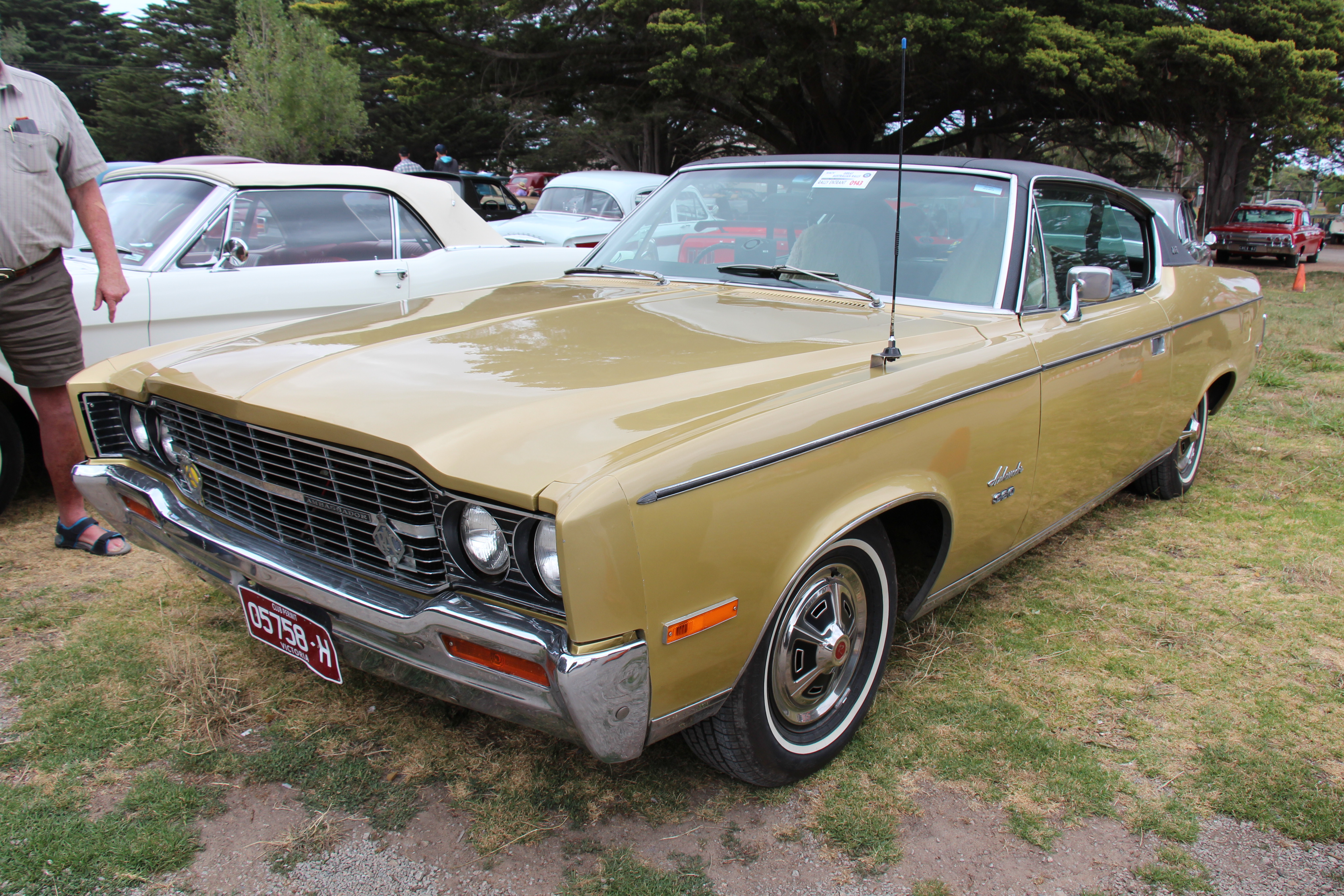
One of 16 two-door hardtop factory-RHD Ambassadors brought into Australia in 1970

Australian Motor Industries (AMI) obtained the rights to assemble and distribute Ramblers in 1960, starting with the Rambler Ambassador. The 1961, 1962, and 1963 model year Ambassadors were built in Australia at AMI's facilities at Port Melbourne, Victoria. The 1961 sedan, which was powered by a 327 cu in (5.4 L) V8, was the most powerful car being assembled in Australia at that time. Knock-down kits featuring right-hand drive were shipped from Kenosha for assembly by AMI. The Australian-built Ambassadors included a significant percentage of "local content" to gain import tariff (tax) concessions by using parts and components (such as interiors and upholstery) that were sourced from Australian manufacturers. AMI's first year of production resulted in 65 registrations for 1961. Registrations of the 1963 model continued into 1964, with a total of 21 Ambassadors registered for 1964.

Although not documented by AMI records, it is concluded that 20 right-hand drive 1970 Ambassadors were fully imported from Kenosha, apparently 16 two-door hardtops and 4 four-door sedans. A possible reason was that it may have been a holding action while AMI was preparing for the assembly of the new 1970 Rebel. All were fitted with AMC's new 360 cu in (5.9 L) V8 and automatic transmission with floor shift.

The dash and instrument pack of the 1967 Ambassador, which had been converted and used in the RHD Ambassadors assembled for the U.S. Postal Service, was standard in all assembly kits for the Rebel and Matador included in all factory-right-hand drive Rebels, Matadors, and Ambassadors exported to the United Kingdom.

=== Costa Rica ===
Rambler vehicles were marketed in Costa Rica since 1959 through Purdy Motor. New local content regulations enacted during the 1960s effectively required vehicles sold in those markets to be assembled from knock-down kits. An assembly plant for Rambler and Toyota vehicles was established, ECASA, and the first Ramblers were produced in Costa Rica by the end of 1965. The company built Ambassadors and other AMC models through 1970, with Toyota increasing ownership of ECASA.

=== Mexico ===
American Motors' first-generation Ambassadors were exported to Mexico in the first half of 1958 and assembled locally in the second half of the same year, and in 1959 by Planta Reo de México based in Monterrey, Nuevo León. The model was restricted to the four-door hardtop sedan. It was powered by the four-barrel 327 cu in (5.4 L) V8 engine producing 270 hp (201 kW; 274 PS) coupled to a three-speed automatic transmission. The model became the marque's top-of-the-line product alongside the three versions of the midsize Rambler and compact Rambler American models.

However, low sales figures alongside a deteriorating relationship between AMC and Planta REO led to the cancellation of the contract in the second half of 1959.

American Motors again exported its products into Mexico with a new local partner, Willys Mexicana. The agreement was signed in March 1960, and production began in Mexico City.

This meant discontinuing the Ambassador line in Mexico as the new operation had several priorities above offering a top-end luxury full-size car line. Aside from marketing the already existing Jeep line, Willys Mexicana focused efforts on the compact Rambler American, which obtained a generation change the following year, meaning a complete retooling of the Vallejo plant. In 1962, legal and industrial requirements in the country became more assertive with the auto industry integration decree issued by the president Adolfo López Mateos in 1962. Among its mandates, it entirely banned the importation of automobile engines. Willys Mexicana began building its engine plant, which was achieved in November 1964. Once the Rambler American was consolidated in the Mexican market, Willys Mexicana opted to expand the product line by introducing the brand-new second-generation Rambler Classic midsize model as a larger luxury counterpart to the economy compact American. Also in 1963, due to problems with WM's parent company (the SOMEX bank) as well as further requirements of the government auto industry decree, Willys Mexicana was reorganized into an entirely new company with expanded capital and direct investment from the Mexican government, Kaiser Willys, and American Motors. This resulted in the formation of Vehiculos Automotores Mexicanos (VAM).

After the corporate transition between 1960 and 1964 concluded, in which the Rambler marque under VAM surpassed the commercial results of its local predecessors Armadora Mexicana and Planta REO combined between 1950 and 1959, the company opted not to offer the Ambassador model. The Mexican market of the era was still relatively small. Since the Ambassador mainly shared the same styling as the contemporary midsize model, internal competition would affect the sales of a simultaneous Classic and Ambassador line-up. Unlike the United States, with a larger and more diverse market for two different car lines with the same styling, AMC could differentiate the models with V8 engines for the Ambassador and the Classic limited to six-cylinder versions. This advantage did not exist in Mexico since VAM could only produce six-cylinder engines in its Lerma plant, while V8 engines could not be imported from AMC because of the 1962 decree. Instead, VAM opted to use the Rambler Classic as its most luxurious and flagship model, giving it the same treatment AMC put in the Ambassador model in the US and Canada. This would be passed on to the subsequent equivalent Rebel and Matador models produced under VAM.

The 1958 and 1959 Ambassador models represent the only chapter in this model's history in Mexico. These were the only full-size American Motors products sold in the country, alongside the second generation 1974-1976 VAM Classic (Matador) models. It was also unique because it was a factory V8 model, the only AMC-based car marketed in Mexico with a V8 engine. Six-cylinder engines would power all subsequent models produced by the VAM.

== International exports ==
=== Canada ===
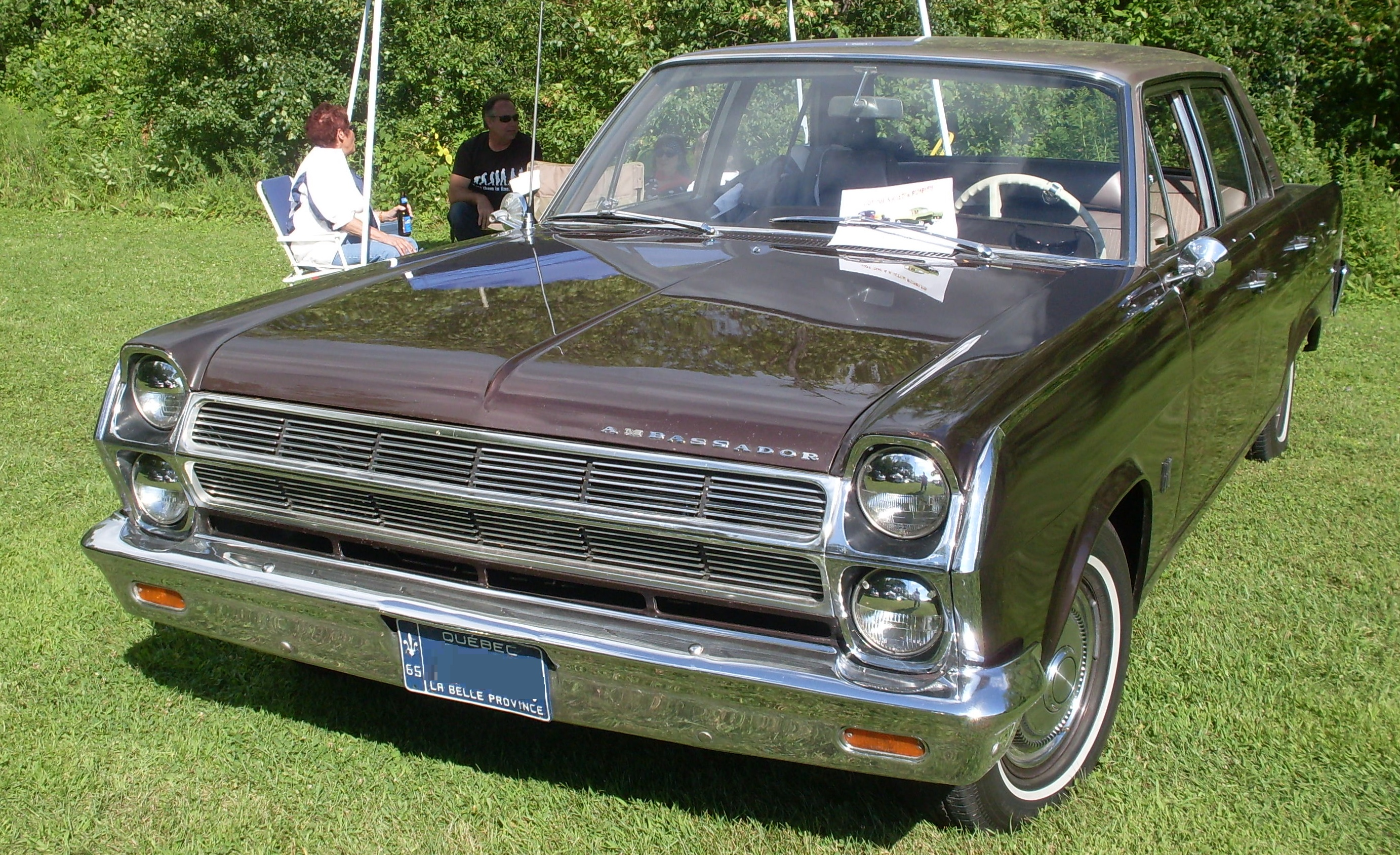
1965 Canadian-built Rambler Ambassador. Ambassadors were imported after 1969.

The Brampton Assembly Plant in Ontario, Canada, had been building Rambler and AMC vehicles since 1962, including the Rambler Ambassador until 1968. From 1969, Canadian-market Ambassadors were imported directly from the United States. The Brampton plant continued to assemble AMC vehicles through the 1970s and 1980s with the additional exceptions of Javelin, Matador, and Pacer, which were also otherwise imported.

=== Finland ===
Ramblers were imported into Finland by two major Finnish automotive importers, Oy Voimavaunu Ab and Suomen Maanvilelijäin Kauppa Oy (SMK Group) during the 1950s and 1960s. From 1962, the Rambler brand was advertised in Finland as an "American success car". Available models included the Ambassador, Classic, and the compact American. From the mid-1960s, the Wihuri Group, a sizeable multi-sector family business, took over import operations using its shipping operation, Autola Oy. Wihuri continued to import small numbers of AMC vehicles until 1975.

=== Germany ===
In 1969, American Motors did a deal with the Jaguar and Aston Martin importer for the Federal Republic of Germany, Peter Lindner GmbH in Frankfurt-Rödelheim. Peter Lindner became the distributor of AMC vehicles for West Germany, with the agreement to import seven AMC models including the AMC Ambassador. Peter Lindner continued to import AMC vehicles until 1977 after which German company Allrad Schmitt became the exclusive distributor for AMC passenger cars and Jeep.

=== New Zealand ===
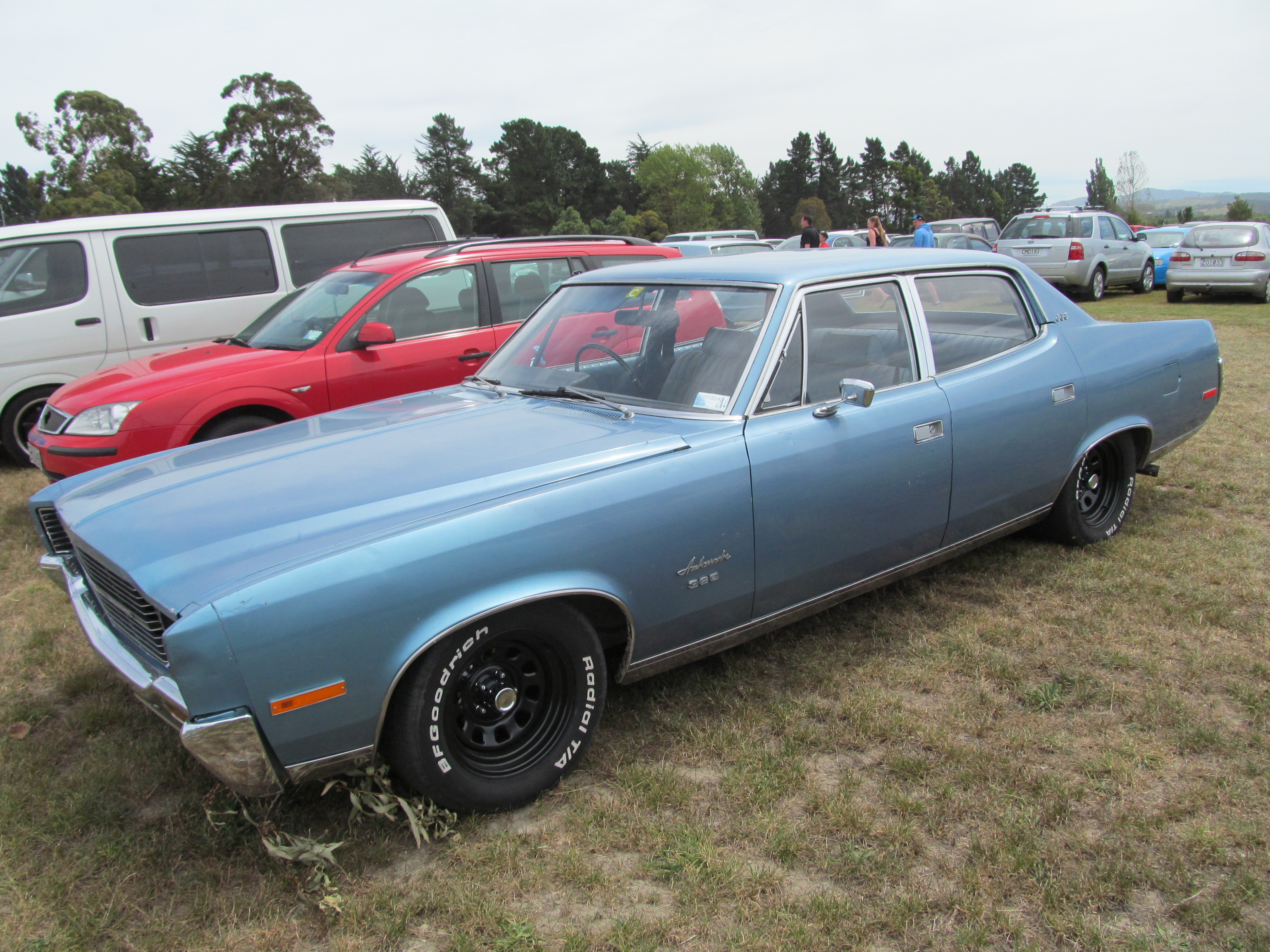
One of 12 factory-RHD 1970 Ambassadors for the New Zealand market

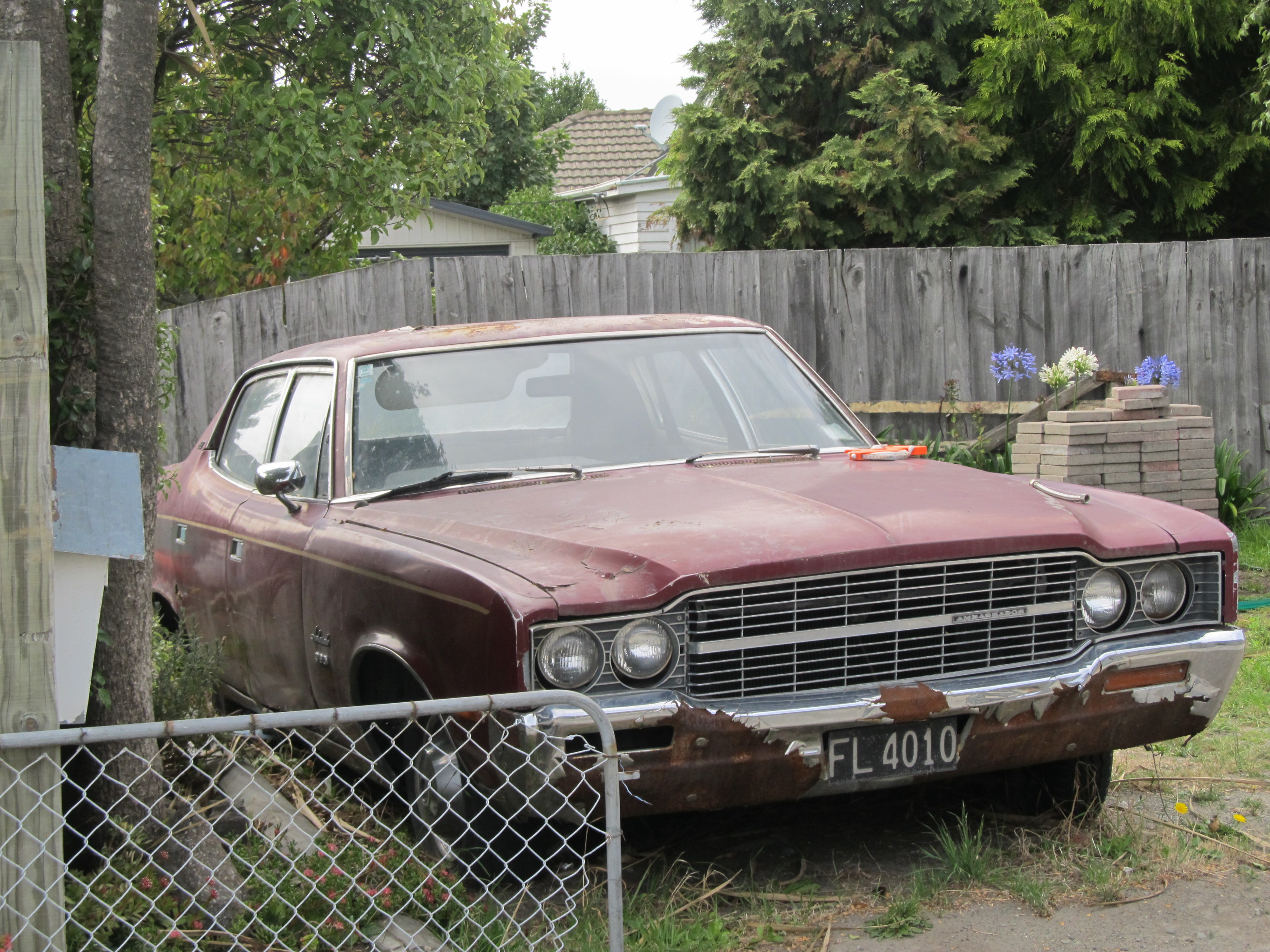
One of 12 NZ-delivered 1970 Ambassadors in a backyard in Christchurch

American Motors' vehicles were assembled in New Zealand by VW Motors in Auckland until 1962, and Campbell Motor Industries (CMI) in Thames, North Island from 1964. CMI assembled the Rambler Classic and Rebel models from knock-down kits and also imported fully assembled factory-right-hand-drive vehicles directly from AMC. Although neither firm locally assembled Ambassadors, twelve 1970 factory-right-hand-drive Ambassadors were believed to have been imported.

These factory-right-hand-drive Ambassadors were built with the same dash, cluster, and instruments as the right-hand-drive Ambassadors previously built for the United States Postal Service in 1967. As with U.S. domestic models, these export models to New Zealand and Australia came with their dash, steering column, and steering wheel color-matched to the interior trim; whereas the dash, steering column, and steering wheel provided for the Rebel and Matador assembly kits built in New Zealand and Australia were available only in black.

=== Norway ===
Ramblers were imported into Norway in the 1950s and 1960s by Norwegian firm Kolberg Caspary Lautom AS at Ås, Norway. KCL was formed in 1906 and imported automotive, industrial, and construction products. Three 1962 model year Ambassadors were brought to Norway in 1962. The Rambler Ambassador was imported by KCL in small numbers from 1963 until 1968. The company brought a total of 21 cars. KCL imported more significant numbers of the Rambler American, Classic, and Rebel during the same period.

=== United Kingdom ===
Rambler Ambassadors were exported in limited numbers to the United Kingdom in factory right-hand-drive direct from AMC during the 1960s and up to its final year of 1974. They were imported by Rambler Motors (A.M.C) Ltd of Chiswick in West London, which had become a subsidiary of AMC in 1961. The location had previously been used since 1926 for British assembly of Hudson, Essex, and Terraplane vehicles. Before 1961, AMC vehicles were imported into the U.K. by Nash Concessionaires, the former importer of pre-AMC Nash and post-AMC Rambler vehicles.

Right-hand-drive Ambassador models marketed in the UK were the Ambassador saloon (sedan), SST hardtop, and station wagon. The one-year-only Ambassador convertible for 1967 was also sold. AMC vehicles were distributed by London distributors Clarke and Simpson Limited and were marketed as "the only American car built with RHD". As with all export markets, the UK models were marketed as "Rambler" even after the Rambler marque was dropped in the United States.

Kenosha-built right-hand-drive Ambassadors were built with the same 1967 Ambassador dash and double dials as right-hand-drive Rebels and Matadors assembled from knock-down kits in Australia and New Zealand. As with the Australian-built second-generation Matador, the UK-market Ambassador and Matador models built at Kenosha used the newer 1974 U.S.-version triple rectangular instrument dials in the older 1967 dash.

== Epilogue ==
The changing marketplace made American Motors focus on its newly acquired Jeep line, the redesigned 1974 Matador coupe, and the Pacer, which would debut in 1975. Therefore, the investment in continuing the full-size, low-volume Ambassador line after its 1974 redesign was not sustainable. Instead, the automaker upgraded the Matador line. The full-size automobile market segment was declining, so AMC's strategy shifted from offering a full range of automobiles to focusing on its smaller cars and sport-utility vehicles.

American Motors essentially continued the Ambassador in the form of Matador four-door sedans and station wagons. From 1975, the Matador became available in the up-level "Brougham" trim and even assumed the model code numbers of the previously equivalent Ambassadors. The Matador was also offered in a unique top-of-the-line Barcelona four-door sedan in the cars' final year of production, 1978.
