= Pawnbroker (disambiguation) =

A pawnbroker is an individual or business that offers secured loans to people, with items of personal property used as collateral.

Pawnbroker may refer to:

- The Pawnbroker, a novel by Edward Lewis Wallant
- The Pawnbroker (film), a 1964 American drama film
- Pawnbroker (dragster), a 1969 rear-engined dragster

== See also ==
- Pawn shop (disambiguation)
