= Researcher (dragster) =

Overview
- Manufacturer: Race Car Specialties
- Designer: Chuck Tanko (chassis); Kenny Ellis (body)

Body and chassis
- Class: Top Gas
- Body style: Rear-engined streamliner dragster
- Layout: Rear-engine, rear-wheel-drive

Powertrain
- Engine: 465 cu in (7,620 cc) Chrysler hemi

Dimensions
- Wheelbase: 254 in (6,500 mm)

Researcher is a streamliner dragster, sponsored by National Speed Products.

Designed by Chuck Tanko in 1971, the car was a fairly conventional rear-engined dragster, except for a winglet (similar to the one Tony Nancy used the same year) between the front wheels. It used a Race Car Specialties chassis with a 254 in (6,500 mm) wheelbase (long, by the standards of the era) and was bodied in aluminum by Kenny Ellis, who also drove it. In testing, it ran 7.20 seconds at 210 mph (340 km/h). Powered by a 465 cu in (7,620 cc) Chrysler hemi, it qualified for the last-ever NHRA Top Gas event, the 1971 NHRA Supernationals at Ontario, California.

== Sources ==
- Taylor, Thom. "Beauty Beyond the Twilight Zone" in Hot Rod, April 2017, pp. 30–43.
