= Videoliner (dragster) =

Overview
- Designer: Steve Swaja (body); Frank Huzar (chassis)

Body and chassis
- Class: Top Fuel
- Body style: Slingshot streamliner dragster

Videoliner is a streamliner slingshot dragster, built for "TV Tommy" Ivo.

== History ==
Designed by Steve Swaja, Videoliner used a Frank Huzar chassis and aluminum body built by Bob Sorrell. It had a dropped front axle and bicycle wheels, a partially enclosed engine (leaving the blower and blower scoop exposed), and enclosed slicks (without wheel covers or skirts). The rear of the cockpit was also closed, but there was no canopy. The exhaust pipes exited flush with the top of the body on either side, ahead of the cockpit.

The car was built for "TV Tommy" Ivo, who planned to barnstorm the U.S. in 1965, but in test runs at Fremont, he found exhaust fumes and burnt rubber tended to enter the cockpit; worse still, the car had a tendency to spin when approaching the end of a pass. To cure the exhaust problem, Ivo cut vents over the slicks and routed the exhaust into the wheelwells, which then proceeded to damage the aluminum body.

Chopping off some of the bodywork and "scalloping" the fenders was done in a futile effort to cure the "spooky handling". Failure led Ivo to purchase the conventional Red Wing fueller.

Videoliner set a best pass of 7.82 seconds at 199 mph (320 km/h).

== Sources ==
- Taylor, Thom. "Beauty Beyond the Twilight Zone" in Hot Rod, April 2017, p.31.
