= Scuderia (dragster) =

Overview
- Manufacturer: Williams-Devine-McDougall (racing team)
- Designer: Jack Williams

Body and chassis
- Class: Top Gas
- Body style: Slingshot streamliner dragster

Powertrain
- Engine: 404 cu in (6,620 cc) Chrysler hemi

Scuderia is a streamliner dragster.

In 1963, Jack Williams' Vancouver, British Columbia–based drag racing team (Williams-Devine-McDougall) rebuilt Williams' old slingshot rail with a new aluminum body (painted in blue metalflake), with a very long, pointed nose, faired-in engine, and blue-tinted Lexan canopy over the cockpit. The car's front wheels were spoked motorcycle wheels, the exhausts long "weed cutter"-style pipes (exiting horizontally, rather than vertically).

The engine was a 404 cu in (6,620 cc) Chrysler hemi with a front-driven Potvin supercharger. Ron Lowe replaced Devine and McDougall.

Scuderia made her debut at the 1963 NHRA Winternationals at Pomona, California in Top Gas, recording a best pass of 8.83 seconds at 169.17 mph (272.25 km/h) before mechanical trouble sidelined her. She also won the "Best Appearing" award. At Arlington, Scuderia set a Top Gas record (average of two passes) at 162.22 mph (261.07 km/h).

The car was retired in 1967. In the 1980s, Scuderia made a comeback when Williams entered her in West Coast nostalgia drag races, crashing at Fremont. He restored the car and returned to racing in the early 1990s.

== Sources ==
- Taylor, Thom. "Beauty Beyond the Twilight Zone" in Hot Rod, April 2017, pp.30–43.
