= Yellow Fang (dragster) =

Overview
- Production: 1963
- Designer: Steve Swaja (chassis); Tom Hanna (body)

Body and chassis
- Class: Top Fuel
- Body style: Front-engined streamliner dragster

Powertrain
- Engine: Blown 398 cu in (6,520 cc) Chrysler hemi

Dimensions
- Wheelbase: 153 in (3,900 mm)

Yellow Fang is a streamliner slingshot dragster.

Designed by Steve Swaja (with some tweaking by owner George Schreiber and his boss, "Big Daddy" Roth) and built by Jim Davis in 1963, the car had a 153 in (3,900 mm) wheelbase. The aluminum body, hammered by Tom Hanna for US$5000, had a very pointed nose, canopied cockpit, and V-shaped "claw" tail, and was painted Diamond T yellow with red lettering (hence the name). The straight front axle had bicycle wheels and wing-like fairings. The engine, a blown Chrysler hemi (bored 0.030 in (0.76 mm) over, for a total displacement of 398.6 cu in (6,532 cc)) prepared by Bill Demerest (but maintained by owner-driver Schreiber), was exposed, as were the wheels.

Early trial passes revealed problems with the cockpit canopy, and when Schreiber took over the driving chores, it was removed. He raced in Australia and the U.S. on an exhibition tour during 1967 and 1968.

The car now resides in the Don Garlits Museum of Drag Racing in Ocala, Florida.

== Sources ==
- Taylor, Thom. "Beauty Beyond the Twilight Zone" in Hot Rod, April 2017, pp. 30–43.
