= Wynns Stormer =

Overview
- Manufacturer: Woody Gilmore

Body and chassis
- Class: Top Fuel
- Body style: Streamliner dragster

Wynns Stormer is a streamliner dragster.

Built in 1972 by Woody Gilmore (who also produced Don Prudhomme's wedge digger), on a Woody chassis, the car had bicycle front wheels and dropped front axle, a very pointed nose, and an engine cover with broad, wedge-like fairings over the exhaust pipes, ahead of the rear tires; the fairings sloped steeply from track level to the top of the tires.

In theory, the wedge body offered an aerodynamic advantage, decreasing turbulent airflow over the rear wheels, as well as increasing downforce; in practise, the extra weight exceeded any advantage.

Driven by Kenney Goodell (nicknamed "Action Man"), the car turned in routine 6.67 second e.t.s, no better than Goodell's contemporary funny car (and so much higher than competing T/F dragsters).

== Sources ==
- Taylor, Thom. "Beauty Beyond the Twilight Zone" in Hot Rod, April 2017, pp. 30–43.
