= Steve Swaja =

American dragster designer in the 1960s

Steve Swaja is an American dragster designer in the 1960s.

Swaja was responsible for both Tony Nancy wedge cars of 1963, the Yellow Fang slingshot in 1963, and "TV Tommy" Ivo's Videoliner in 1965.

He designed Tony Nancy's first dragster, "The Silver Car", in 1963; it was built at Tommy Ivo & d Rod Pepmuller's shop, with the aluminum bending done by Bob Sorrell; the car won "Best Engineered" at its debut, the 1963 Winternationals.

Among Swaja's other projects were cars for Rocky Childs, Ewell-Stecker-Kamboor, Fred Fischback, Scrima-Milodon, Dusty Rhodes, and Eagle Electric; he also did Hot Rod's XR-6 roadster.

Swaja became good friends with Nancy.

== Sources ==
- Taylor, Thom. "Beauty Beyond the Twilight Zone" in Hot Rod, April 2017, pp. 30–43.
