= Petersen and Fritz dragster =

Overview
- Manufacturer: Woody Gilmore
- Also called: Can-Am dragster

Body and chassis
- Class: Top Fuel
- Body style: Front-engined streamliner dragster

Powertrain
- Engine: 392 cu in (6,420 cc) Chrysler hemi

The Petersen and Fritz dragster, also known as the Can-Am dragster, is a streamliner dragster.

Purchased by Herman Petersen in 1974, it was built on a Woody chassis with a blue-anodized aluminum body, which strongly resembled a contemporary Can-Am car.

It was powered by a Donovan 392 cu in (6,420 cc) Chrysler hemi (when most of the competition was running 426 cu in (6,980 cc) hemis). This, plus the 200 lb (91 kg) weight disadvantage thanks to the full body, meant it was only capable of mid-6 second e.t.s, when conventional fuellers were running low sixes.

The car ran a total of just nineteen times before being retired. It was restored by Petersen in the 1980s, and now resides in the Don Garlits Museum of Drag Racing in Ocala, Florida.

== Sources ==
- Taylor, Thom. "Beauty Beyond the Twilight Zone" in Hot Rod, April 2017, pp. 30–43.
