= Pawnbroker (dragster) =

Overview
- Production: 1969
- Designer: Woody Gilmore

Body and chassis
- Class: Top Fuel
- Body style: Rear-engined dragster
- Layout: Rear-engine, rear-wheel-drive

Pawnbroker is a pioneering rear-engined dragster built in 1969.

== History ==
In 1969, prodded to action by the death of John Mulligan earlier in the year, Woody Gilmore (following the mid-engined Funny Car he built for Doug Thorley) and Pat Foster developed a rear-engined fuel dragster, which was unveiled in December. Gilmore and Foster built a similar car for Dwane Ong, incorporating the lessons of the previous car; vertical struts, with no wing (yet), prevented side-to-side motion. Powered by a Ramchargers-built engine, Pawnbroker ran 10–11 in (250–280 mm)-wide M&H slicks on 12 in (300 mm)-wide rims, rather than the usual 12 in (300 mm) and 16 in (410 mm) widths.

Sponsored by Hastings Manufacturing's oil additive, Torque, it debuted in Las Vegas, Nevada, in 1970, and wore livery of white overall with red and blue longitudinal stripes along the sides.

In August, Ong won the 1970 AHRA Nationals in the car.

Pawnbroker won the American Hot Rod Association (AHRA) Summernats in Long Island, New York, the first national event win for a rear-engined car, with a pass of 6.83 at 219 mph (352 km/h). Ong ran the car mostly at AHRA events before switching back to Funny Car.
