= Showboat (disambiguation) =

A showboat or show boat, is a boat which serves as a floating theater.

Showboat, Show Boat or Showboats may also refer to:

== Arts and entertainment ==
=== Music ===
- Show Boat (1959 cast album), featuring Shirley Bassey and Dora Bryan
- Show Boat (1988 cast album), featuring Karla Burns and Jerry Hadley
- Showboat (Kenny Dorham album), 1960

=== Novel and adaptations ===
- Show Boat (novel), by Edna Ferber
  - Show Boat, a 1927 stage musical by Jerome Kern and Oscar Hammerstein II based on the Ferber novel
    - Show Boat (1936 film), adapted by Oscar Hammerstein II and directed by James Whale, based on the stage musical
    - Show Boat (1951 film), adapted by John Lee Mahin and directed by George Sidney, based on the stage musical
  - Show Boat (1929 film), adapted by Charles Kenyon and directed by Harry A. Pollard, based on the Ferber novel

=== Radio ===
- Maxwell House Show Boat, a program broadcast on NBC radio (1933-1935)

== Hotels and casinos ==
- Showboat Atlantic City, a hotel and former casino located in Atlantic City, New Jersey
- Showboat East Chicago, an East Chicago casino currently known as the Ameristar Casino East Chicago
- Showboat Hotel & Casino, a Las Vegas casino later known as the Castaways Hotel and Casino
- Showboat, Inc., a United States-based organization in the casino and entertainment industry

== Sports ==
- Memphis Showboats, a former United States Football League team
- Memphis Showboats (2022), a United States Football League team
- South Texas Showboats, a former basketball team in the American Basketball Association

== People ==
- Showboat Fisher (1899–1994), American baseball player
- Robert Hall (basketball) (1927–2014), American basketball player and member of the Harlem Globetrotters nicknamed "Showboat"
- LaMont "ShowBoat" Robinson (born 1961), American basketball player, businessman and founder and owner/player of the Harlem Clowns

== Other uses ==
- Showboat (dragster), an exhibition dragster built in the 1960s
- Showboat, the nickname of American Battleship USS North Carolina (BB-55)
- Showboat, a person who is showing off, particularly in sports

== See also ==
- Showboaters, a 2011 British reality show
