= List of AMC Transmission Applications =

American Motors Corporation (AMC) and Jeep used a variety of transmissions and transfer cases.

This list covers AMC (1954+) and Jeep (1946+) variants thru 1988, and those legacy designs retained by Chrysler after 1988.

== Early AMC (1955-1971) automatic ==
- AMC passenger cars

Model	OEM	Transmission; Material	Gears	Cooling	Engine	Years Used
Hydramatic; Flash-away	GM	Iron	4	oil/water	All I6; 250/327 V8	1956–1957
Ultramatic	Packard	Iron	2	oil/water	320 V8	1955–1956
M-8	Borg-Warner	Iron	3	oil/water	196 I6; 250/287/327 V8	1957–1964 (196 only thru 1961)
M-10 (Note: The "M-10" is not the actual Borg-Warner designation. This is a variation of the M-8 that uses a TV (Throttle Valve) cable instead of a vacuum modulator to control internal transmission pressure. The TV cable also serves as a "kick-down" control when fully pushed in under a predetermined speed. Most parts interchange, but the case and valve body are different to accommodate TV cable or vacuum modulator.)	Borg-Warner	Iron	3	oil/water	287/327 V8	1965–1966
M-11	Borg-Warner	Iron	3	oil/water	343	1967-1969
M-11	Borg-Warner	Iron	3	oil/water	290 4bbl V8	1967-1969
M-11B	Borg-Warner	Iron	3	oil/water	360	1970–1971
M-12	Borg-Warner	Iron	3	oil/water	390/401	1968–1971
M-35	Borg-Warner	Aluminum	3	air	196 I6	1962-1965
M-36**	Borg-Warner	Aluminum	3	air	199 I6	1966–1969
M-37 (Note: The M-36 and 37 have provisions for an external oil/water or oil/air cooler. Heavy-duty and towing package configurations came from the factory with oil/water cooling instead of air cooling. An aftermarket air/air cooler can be added. Some were added by dealers at purchasers request. Extra internal parts may be required for an external cooler.)	Borg-Warner	Aluminum	3	air	232 I6	1966–1969
M-40	Borg-Warner	Aluminum	3	oil/water	290 2-bbl V8	1967–1969
M-42	Borg-Warner	Aluminum	3	oil/water	199 I6	1970–1971
M-43	Borg-Warner	Aluminum	3	oil/water	232 I6	1970–1971
M-44	Borg-Warner	Aluminum	3	oil/water	304 V8	1970–1971

== Early Jeep Automatic (1970-1971) ==
- Jeep CJ
- Jeep Wagoneer/Grand Wagoneer

Kaiser Jeep was purchased by AMC in 1970.

The Buick 350 cu in (5.7 L) V8, AMC 232 I6, and AMC 327, 360 V8 engines in the FSJ Wagoneer and trucks used a 'nailhead' pattern TH400—also known as a "unipattern," as it was used by many other manufacturers (including Rolls-Royce and Jaguar) with an adapter ring—from 1965 to 1972.

The Buick 225 cu in (3.7 L) V6, available with an optional automatic transmission in the Jeepster Commando, used the same 'nailhead' pattern TH400. Starting in 1973, AMC discontinued the use of the adapter ring, as it sourced a TH400 case from GM with the AMC bellhousing pattern already cast. The TH400 AMC case was used until the end of 1979 model production.

The 232 cu in (3.8 L) I6 used in 1970-72 Jeep DJ "Postal Jeep" was backed up by the Borg-Warner T-35 3-speed automatic. At the time of the acquisition, Kaiser-Jeep was using a GM 2-speed Powerglide transmission in the DJ-5A (with the GM-sourced 2.5L I4).

== Late AMC/Jeep (1971-2006) automatic ==
- Jeep Cherokee XJ (1987–2001)
- Jeep Wrangler YJ and TJ (1987–2006)
- Jeep Grand Cherokee ZJ and WJ (1993–2004)
- Jeep Wagoneer/Grand Wagoneer

AMC phased out the use of the Borg-Warner Shift-Command transmissions when the company transitioned to using the Chrysler TorqueFlite. AMC branded the TorqueFlites as the Torque Command using the previous naming convention - both the A-727 and A-904 (including the later 999 derivatives) were used with the addition of the Aisin-Warner 4 (AW4) used with the Jeep XJ series. Jeep vehicles throughout the 1970s used the GM Turbo Hydramatic 400 - the use of the GM transmission goes back to 19, whenre Kaiser-Jeep installed it in the AMC 327 cu in (5.4 L) V8 in the full-size Wagoneer and J-trucks.

The TH400 was phased out for the 1980 models, when the A-727 replaced the TH-400 as the only automatic transmission option for both the SJ Wagoneer/Cherokee wagons and the J-10/J-20 trucks. Internally similar to the Chrysler A-727, the case was one-piece, cast with an AMC pattern bellhousing (not interchangeable with a Chrysler pattern A-727).

Model	OEM	Transmission; Material	Gears	Cooling	Engine	Years Used	Division
727	Chrysler	Aluminum	3	oil/water	258 I6; 360/401 V8	1980–1991	AMC & Jeep
904	Chrysler	Aluminum	3	oil/water	121/150 I4; 232/258 I6; 151 Iron Duke	1972–1987	AMC & Jeep CJ
998	Chrysler	Aluminum	3	oil/water	258 I6 and 304 V8	1972–1987	AMC
999 (30/32RH)	Chrysler	Aluminum	3	oil/water	232/258 I6; 150 (2.5 L) I4	1980–2002	AMC, Jeep
THM400	GM	Aluminum	3	oil/water	232/258 I6; 304/360/401 V8; Buick 350/327 V8, 230 V6	1965–1979	Jeep
AW4	Aisin Warner	Aluminum	4	oil/water	242 (4.0 L) I6	1987–2001	Jeep
500SE (42RE)	Chrysler	Aluminum	4	oil/water	242 (4.0 L) I6	1993–2004	Jeep
42RLE	Chrysler	Aluminum	4	oil/water	3.7, 4.0 (242) V6	2002–present	Jeep

== AMC manual ==
Model	OEM	Transmission Material	Gears 1st, 2nd, 3rd, 4th, Rev	Engine	Years Used	Division
T-96	Borg Warner	Iron	2.605, 1.630, 1.000, 3.536	195.6-199 I6	1958-72	AMC
T-85 w/OD	Borg Warner	Iron	2.57, 1.55, 1.00, 0.70, 3.489	232 I6 all V8	1964-65	AMC
T-86	Borg Warner	Iron	2.57, 1.86, 1.00, 3.154	232 I6; 250-290 V8	1958-67	AMC
T-85	Borg Warner	Iron	2.49, 1.55, 1.00, 3.489	327 V8	1958-66	AMC
T-10	Borg Warner	Iron	2.43, 1.76, 1.47, 1.00, 2.49 (P Series)	all V8	1965-68	AMC
T-10	Borg Warner	Iron	2.64, 2.10, 1.49, 1.00, 2.49 (T series)	all V8	1967-68	AMC
T-10	Borg Warner	Iron	2.23, 1.76, 1.35, 1.00, 2.49 (V series)	all V8	1969-74	AMC
T-14	Borg Warner	Iron	2.636, 1.605, 1.000, 2.636	all I6; 304 V8	1968-74	AMC
T-15	Borg Warner	Iron	2.548, 1.558, 1.000, 2.548	all V8s greater than 304	1968-72	AMC
T-150/150T	Borg Warner	Iron	2.99, 1.75, 1.00, 3.17 (OD 0.75)	I6 and 304 V8 only 1976	1975-79	AMC
SR4	Borg Warner	Aluminium	4.07, 2.39, 1.49, 1.00, 3.95	I4	1979–1981	AMC & Jeep
SR4	Borg Warner	Aluminum	4.07, 2.39, 1.49, 1.00, 3.95	I6 and 304 V8 only 1978-1979	1977-82	AMC
SR4	Borg Warner	Aluminium	3.50, 2.21, 1.43, 1.0, 3.39	I6	1979–1981	Eagle & Jeep
HR1	Ford	Aluminum	3.65, 1.97, 1.37, 1.00, 3.66	2.0 L I4	1977-79	AMC
T-4	Borg Warner	Aluminum	4.03, 2.37, 1.50, 1.00, 3.76	I6	1982-84	AMC
T-5	Borg Warner	Aluminum	4.03, 2.37, 1.50, 1.00, 0.86, 3.76	I6	1982-88	AMC

Sources for ratios are various AMC Technical Service Manuals.

== See also ==
List of Chrysler transmissions (for list of transmission used in AMC vehicles after Chrysler buyout)
