= Woody Gilmore =

Dragster and funny car chassis builder (1933 - 2020)

Woody Gilmore (2 February 1933 – 3 July 2020) was a dragster and funny car chassis builder in the 1960s and 1970s.

Gilmore built the chassis for the top fuel streamliner Hustler VI in 1965.

In 1968, Doug Thorley bought a rear-engined Javelin funny car from Gilmore, powered by an AMC 401.

Gilmore was also responsible for the Don Prudhomme, Rance McDaniel (the Dan Olson Racing Products team), and Wynns Stormer streamliner wedge dragsters, all in 1972.

Gilmore also built the chassis for the Petersen and Fritz "Can-Am" dragster in 1974.

== Sources ==
- McClurg, Bob. "50 Years of Funny Cars: Part 2" in Drag Racer, November 2016, pp. 35–50.
- Taylor, Thom. "Beauty Beyond the Twilight Zone" in Hot Rod, April 2017, pp. 30–43.
