= Tony Nancy Wedge =

Wedge I

Overview
- Manufacturer: RCS
- Designer: Steve Swaja (chassis), Emil Deidt and Wayne Ewing (body)

Body and chassis
- Class: AA/Gas
- Body style: Rear-engined streamliner dragster

Powertrain
- Engine: Supercharged 428 cu in (7,010 cc) Plymouth hemi

The Tony Nancy Wedge was the name given to two streamliner dragsters (also referred to as Wedge I and Wedge II) built for drag racer Tony Nancy.

Designed by Steve Swaja in 1963, they were built to race in the NHRA's AA/Gas (A/Gas supercharged) class. The aluminum body was built by Emil Deidt (formerly of Scarab, who came out of retirement for the job) and Wayne Ewing, on an RCS chassis, with a 145 in (3,700 mm) wheelbase (as insisted on by Nancy). It had a narrow rear end (intended to help keep the car running in a straight line) on a twin torsion bar rear suspension, and straight front axle with bicycle wheels (with a 60 in (1,500 mm) tread), a pointed-nosed body covering both slicks, and mid-mounted engine, with exhaust pipes out the underside of the body ahead of the rear tires.

In theory, the wedge body offered an aerodynamic advantage, decreasing turbulent airflow over the rear wheels, as well as increasing downforce; in practice, the extra weight exceeded any advantage.

Wedge I was powered by a supercharged 428 cu in (7,010 cc) Plymouth hemi and originally painted orange. Wedge I first appeared at the 1964 Winternationals to pass scrutineering. The car ran for the first time in March, 1964, after being painted white. Handling was problematic; at Sandusky, Ohio, in July 1964, Wedge I flipped on its way through the timing lights, at a speed of over 200 mph (320 km/h). (This phenomenon, later common to rear-engine dragsters, would come to be known as "blowover".)

At the 1964 Hot Rod Magazine Championship Drag Races, Wedge I set the low e.t. (elapsed time) of the meet at 8.51 seconds.

Wedge II was modified, with slots above the slicks to allow air trapped under the car to escape and rear suspension deleted, while the wheelbase was also extended. Nancy powered the car with a selection of blown engines: a Plymouth, then a Chrysler hemi, and finally an Olds.

Wedge II was later stored, while Nancy purchased a more conventional slingshot car, and subsequently restored.

In Wedge II trim, the car was auctioned at Monterey, California, in 2007.
