= Tommy Ivo =

American actor and racing driver (born 1936)

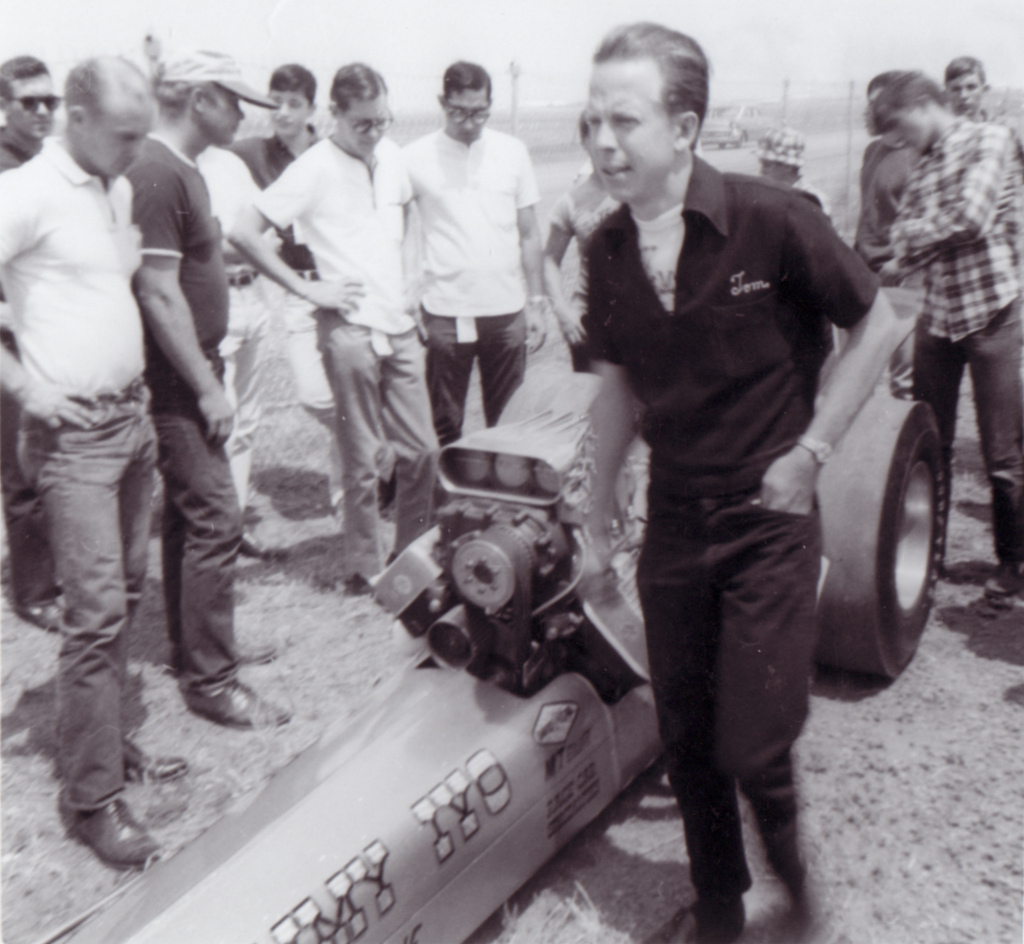
- Born: April 18, 1936 (age 90); Denver, Colorado, U.S.
- Occupations: Actor and Drag racer
- Years active: 1944-73

Tommy Ivo (born April 18, 1936), also known as "TV Tommy" and "Instant Ivo" is an American actor and drag racer, who was active in the 1960s racing community.

== Acting ==
Ivo was born in Denver, Colorado. His acting career began in the early 1940s, with notable performances including Cousin Arne in I Remember Mama (1948), Joey in Prejudice (1949), David in The Lost Volcano with Johnny Sheffield. and William Button in Plymouth Adventure (1952).

In 1955, Ivo appeared as Shelby in the "Heart of a Cheater" episode of the Lone Ranger TV show. He also appeared in Make Room for Daddy as daughter Terry's boyfriend Walter in "Terry Goes Steady" in 1958. The teenage Hot Rod film entitled Ghost of Dragstrip Hollow (1959), features a brief appearance of Tommy Ivo as a dragster racer and race car builder. From 1959 to 1961, Ivo appeared as Herbie Bailey on The Donna Reed Show.

In 1961, Ivo appeared as William, the young son of Motel owner Mrs Prattle -‘Praytell’- in the American ‘neo noir’ crime Film “The Cat Burglar” written by actor and former criminal Leo Gordon, starring Jack Hogan, June Kenney and John Baer.

Ivo guest starred in an episode of the syndicated adventure television series, Rescue 8 and in two episodes of Leave It to Beaver (one being S3E37’s “Wally’s Play” as “The Duke”). He also guest starred on the ABC/Warner Brothers western series, Sugarfoot and on the NBC western series The Tall Man. In several episodes of Father Knows Best, he played one of the Bud Anderson's friends. During the 1961–62 TV season, Ivo played the role of Haywood Botts in another ABC sitcom, Margie. In 1963 he appeared in the "Honeymoon Hotel" episode of the Petticoat Junction.

== Racing ==
In the late 1950s, Ivo raced a twin (side by side) Buick nailhead-engined dragster which was the first gasoline-powered dragster to break the nine-second barrier.

The car held the Drag News AA/GD et record at 8.69. The Twin Buick also was the first gas dragster to record speeds of 170, 175 and 180 mph which were Standard 1320 records as well. It was unique in appearance and won numerous races, including NASCAR's first National Drag Race. Later he designed a four-engine, four-wheel-drive dragster he called Showboat (with a quartet of Nailheads), but NHRA ruled it the first "exhibition" dragster, and he was unable to race it.

In 1963, Ivo's Barnstormer, a nitro-burning 392 Hemi-powered slingshot, purchased to replace the failed Videoliner,) became one of only two seven-second Top Fuel dragsters, so he staged a Seven Second Match Race with the other, the Greer Black Prudhomme dragster, driven by Don Prudhomme – Prudhomme won. During 1964, Ivo traveled to England, with Don Garlits and other racers, to participate in the First International Drag Festival, a six-event series that did much to promote drag racing in the United Kingdom.

During 1972 and 1973, Ivo attended 100 race meets; this record was matched only by "Jungle Jim" Liberman and Ed "The Ace" McCulloch. He retired from the circuit in 1982.

=== Awards ===
- He was inducted in the Motorsports Hall of Fame of America in 2005 for his drag racing career.
- Ranked No.25 on the National Hot Rod Association Top 50 Drivers, 1951–2000.

== Sources ==
- Goldrup, Tom and Jim (2002). Growing Up on the Set: Interviews with 39 Former Child Actors of Film and Television. McFarland & Co. pp. 143–152. ISBN 1476613702.
- Holmstrom, John (1996). The Moving Picture Boy: An International Encyclopaedia from 1895 to 1995. Norwich: Michael Russell, p. 197.
- Scherr, Elana. "Tommy Ivo's Treasures", in Hot Rod, 8/2014, p75-83.
- Taylor, Thom. "Beauty Beyond the Twilight Zone" in Hot Rod, April 2017, pp. 30–43.
