= Sidewinder III =

Overview
- Designer: Kent Fuller

Body and chassis
- Class: BB/GD
- Body style: Transverse-engined streamliner dragster
- Related: None

Dimensions
- Wheelbase: 123 in (3,100 mm)

Chronology
- Predecessor: None
- Successor: None

Sidewinder III is a streamliner dragster.

Built by Kent Fuller in 1969, it used a transversly-mounted supercharged 350 Chevy (hence "sidewinder") in a magnesium-tube chassis with a 123 in (3,100 mm) wheelbase. It was run by the team of Hopkins, Thornhill, and Finicle in BB/GD (B supercharged gas dragster).

== Sources ==
- Taylor, Thom. "Beauty Beyond the Twilight Zone" in Hot Rod, April 2017, pp. 30–43.
