= Showboat (dragster) =

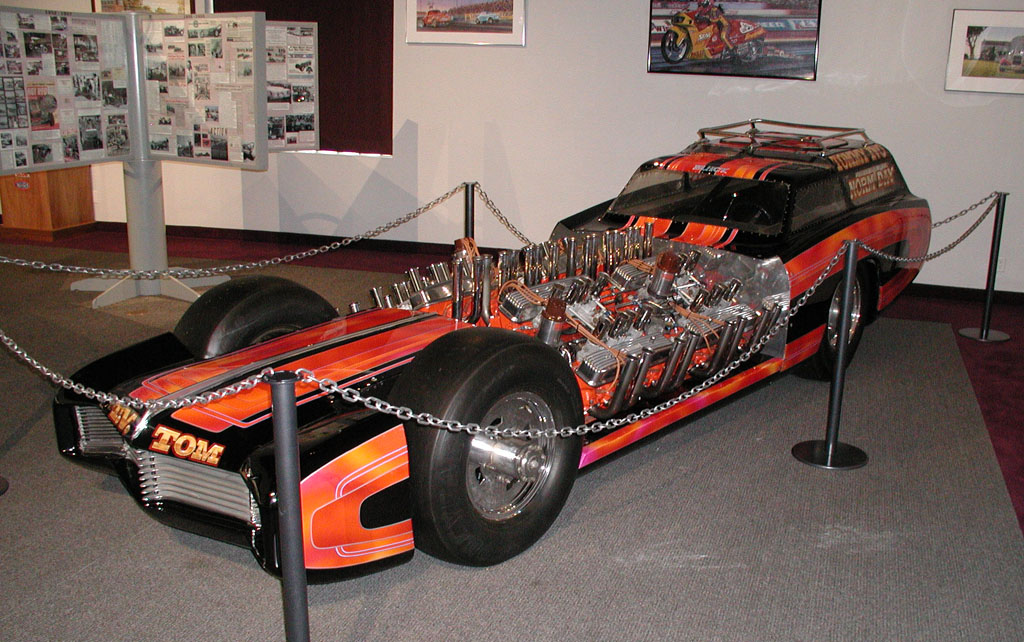
Tommy Ivo's Showboat dragster with the body on

Showboat is a four-engined four-wheel-drive exhibition slingshot dragster, built by "TV Tommy" Ivo in the 1960s.

Showboat featured four Buick nailhead V8s, linked together; two drove the rear wheels, two the front.

While Ivo never liked the name, Showboat proved one of the most popular models of his cars.

Showboat was Hot Rod's December 1961 cover car.

== Sources ==
- Scherr, Elana. "Tommy Ivo's Treasures", in Hot Rod, August 2014, pp. 75–83.
