= Re-Entry (dragster) =

American drag racing vehicle (1966–1966)

Overview
- Designer: Robert Lindwall

Body and chassis
- Class: Top Fuel
- Body style: Rear-engined streamliner dragster

Powertrain
- Engine: 392 cu in (6,420 cc) hemi

Re-Entry is a streamliner dragster.

Built by Robert Lindwall, Re-Entry seems to have benefitted from his experience in hydroplane racing, featuring a semi-enclosed cockpit and enclosed engine and rear end, mated to a typical Top Fuel car's bicycle wheels, dropped axle, and zoomie pipes. The body was all-aluminum. Re-Entry was powered by a 392 cu in (6,420 cc) hemi.

Re-Entry debuted at Cordova Dragway, Illinois, in 1966, where she turned in the first 200 mph (320 km/h) pass for a rear-engined dragster.

At Indianapolis the next weekend, Racing against Connie kalitta Robert or Bob Lindwall clocked a 9.52 second pass at 201.34 mph (324.03 km/h), only to have the car pirouette through the traps, wrecking it. Lindwall did not rebuild the car and quit drag racing.

== Sources ==
- Taylor, Thom. "Beauty Beyond the Twilight Zone" in Hot Rod, April 2017, pp. 30–43.
