= AMC V8 engine =

American automobile engine

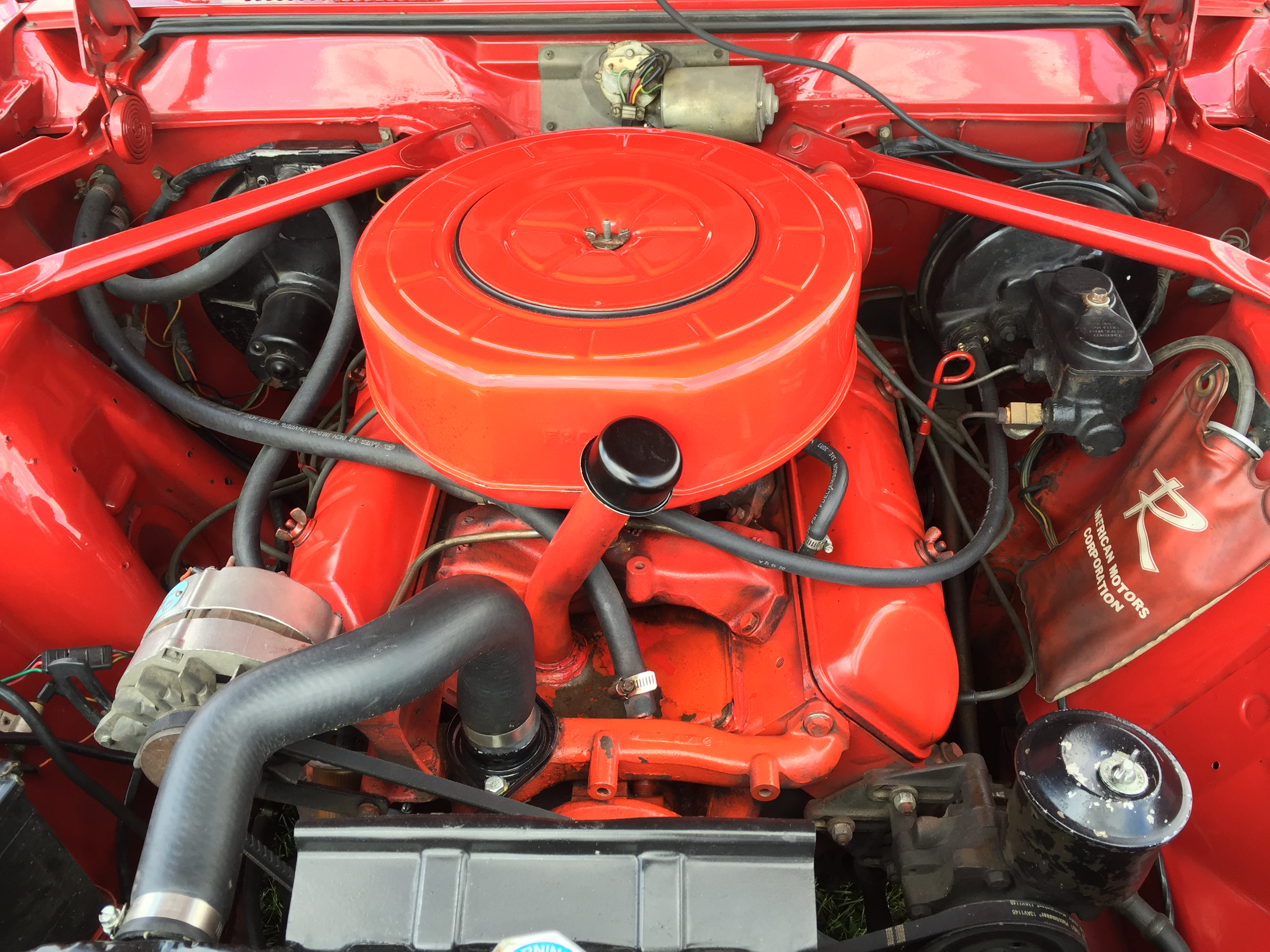
- AMC 327 V8 in a 1965 Rambler Marlin

Overview
- Manufacturer: American Motors Corporation (1956–1987); Chrysler Corporation (1987–1991)
- Production: 1956–1991

Layout
- Configuration: Naturally aspirated 90° V8 engine
- Displacement: 209 cu in (3.4 L); 250 cu in (4.1 L); 287 cu in (4.7 L); 290 cu in (4.8 L); 304 cu in (5.0 L); 327 cu in (5.4 L); 343 cu in (5.6 L); 360 cu in (5.9 L); 390 cu in (6.4 L); 401 cu in (6.6 L)
- Cylinder bore: 3 1/2 in (88.9 mm); 3 3/4 in (95.3 mm); 4 in (101.6 mm); 4.08 in (103.6 mm); 4.165 in (105.8 mm)
- Piston stroke: 3 1/4 in (82.6 mm); 3.28 in (83.3 mm); 3.44 in (87.4 mm); 3.574 in (90.8 mm); 3.68 in (93.5 mm)
- Valvetrain: OHV 2 valves x cyl.
- Compression ratio: 8.25:1, 8.4:1, 8.5:1, 8.7:1, 9.0:1, 9.5:1, 9.7:1, 10.0:1, 10.2:1, 10.5:1, 12.2:1

Combustion
- Fuel system: 2 & 4 bbl. Motorcraft Carburetor; Electronic fuel injection
- Fuel type: Gasoline
- Cooling system: Water-cooled

Output
- Power output: 120–1,100 hp (89–820 kW)
- Torque output: 219–435 lb⋅ft (297–590 N⋅m)

Dimensions
- Dry weight: 600 lb (270 kg) (1956–1967)

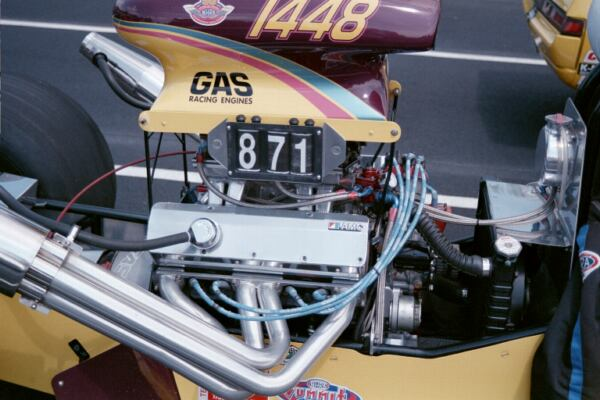
AMC engine in a gas dragster

The AMC V8 may refer to either of two distinct OHV V8 engine designs developed and manufactured by American Motors Corporation (AMC) starting in 1956. These engines were used in cars and trucks by AMC, Kaiser, and International Harvester, as well as in marine and stationary applications. From 1956 through 1987, the automaker equipped its vehicles exclusively with AMC-designed V8 engines.

The first generation was produced from 1956 through 1967. A Bendix Electrojector version was to be the first commercial electronic fuel-injected (EFI) production engine for the 1957 model year.

The second generation was introduced in 1966 and became available in several displacements over the years, as well as in high-performance and racing versions.

In 1987, Chrysler Corporation acquired AMC and continued manufacturing the AMC "tall-deck" 360 cu in (5.9 L) version until 1991 for use in the Jeep Grand Wagoneer SUV.

== American Motors Corporation Gen 1 (1956–1967) ==
American Motors' president, George W. Mason, had negotiated a verbal agreement with Packard that the two companies would supply parts for each other when practical. The arrangement was a prelude to a possible merger of the two companies at a later date, but the corporate consolidation did not materialize. With the industry-wide acceptance of V8 engine designs after World War II, AMC purchased Packard V8s in 1954 for the 1955 Nash Ambassador and Hudson Hornet.

These Packard V8s were supplied to AMC with extra-thick head gaskets to reduce power output and were mated only to Packard "Ultramatic" automatic transmissions. In addition to the verbal agreement, Packard sent AMC some parts bids, which were rejected as too expensive. After Mason's sudden death in October 1954, George W. Romney, AMC's new CEO, decided against further relationships with Packard. Reportedly, Romney gave orders to design an in-house V8 engine as quickly as possible.

Design work on AMC's first V8 engine began in 1954, yielding versions produced in three displacements for AMC automobiles: 250 cu in (4.1 L) in 1956-1961, 287 cu in (4.7 L) in 1963-1966, and 327 cu in (5.4 L) from 1956 until 1966. This engine series is often called the "Rambler V8". The 327 versions of the Rambler and the Chevrolet V8, which was introduced later, share the same bore, stroke, and displacements; they are unrelated.

A 1956 SAE article entitled "The New American Motors V8" describes the results of development efforts and problems of constructing an engine that is economical, low in weight, durable, and flexible.

The entire program was under the direction of Meade F. Moore, Vice-President of Automotive Research and Engineering, and through his efforts, the project was carried on cooperatively by our Kenosha and Detroit Engineering Departments. Obviously, such a division of both design and development required the utmost in teamwork by F.F. Kishline, Chief Engineer, and his assistants, E.L. Monson and J.S. Voigt in Kenosha, and by R.H. Isbrandt, Chief Design Engineer, and W.S. Berry, Chief Mechanical Engineer, in Detroit."

The engineering team was able to get the clean sheet V8 into production in less than 18 months, due in part to being able to apply the research and development efforts done by Kaiser-Frazer for engines that never reached production. One of AMC's engineers, David Potter, had worked on developing V8 engines for Kaiser-Frazer.

American Motors' first V8 engine debuted with 250 cu in (4.1 L) in 1956, with a 327 cu in (5.4 L) version in 1957. The larger displacement engine included a pioneering electronic fuel-injected (EFI) system sourced from Bendix, the "Electrojector" version in 1957.

All first generation engines share common external dimensions, lightweight - about 600 lb (270 kg) - forged crankshaft and rods, as well as most other parts. The stroke for all Gen-1 V8s is 3 1/4-inch (82.6 mm). Engine displacement was a factor of the bore: the 250 cu in (4.1 L) has a 3 1/2-inch (88.9 mm) bore, 287 cu in (4.7 L) 3 3/4 inches (95.3 mm), and the 327 cu in (5.4 L) a 4-inch (101.6 mm) bore. A number indicating the bore size is cast on the top of the engine block's flywheel housing immediately behind the right bank cylinder head.

The block features a deep skirt where the casting extends below the crankshaft centerline, forming a very rigid crankcase gallery. The oil system feeds a central gallery to the cam and crankshaft first, from front to rear, and then divides at the front to feed the two lifter galleries from front to rear. From the rear of the two lifter galleries, oil is then supplied up to the two rocker arm shafts which serve as galleries to lubricate the valvetrain. The fore-and-aft direction changes are designed to eliminate stagnant oil areas that tend to form sludge deposits.

=== 250 ===
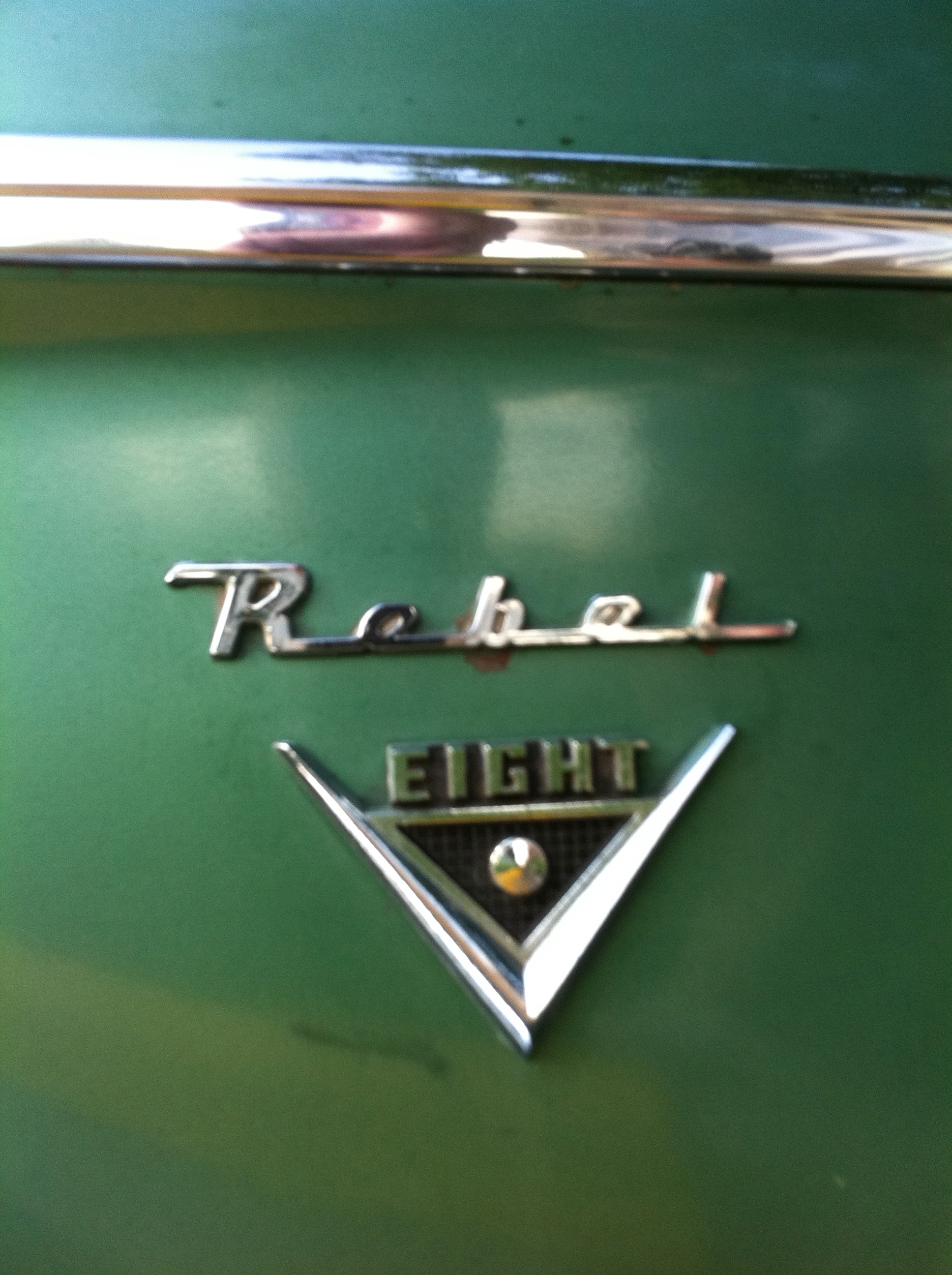
1960 Rebel V8 emblem

American Motors' first in-house V8 engine, the 250 cu in (4.1 L) was used in AMC automobiles from 1956 through 1961. It is a modern OHV/pushrod engine design and debuted in the Nash Ambassador and Hudson Hornet "Specials" of 1956. These cars had the top-of-the-line model trim, but were built on the shorter wheelbase (Statesman and Wasp) models (hence the name "Special"). The 250 uses solid lifters and came in two- and four-barrel carburetor varieties. However, all the Nash/Hudson "Specials" featured a four-barrel carburetor.

The 250 V8 was optional in the 1957 Rambler. All 1958 through 1960 V8 Ramblers were called "Rebels" and designated as a different series. The Rambler V8 and the 1958 through 1960 Rebel line are not the same as the 1957 Rambler Rebel, a limited edition muscle car featuring a high-performance 327 cu in (5.4 L) engine. In 1961, the Rambler Six was renamed the "Rambler Classic" to avoid model confusion in the Rambler line-up. A V8 engine then became an option on the Classic rather than being a separate model

=== 287 ===
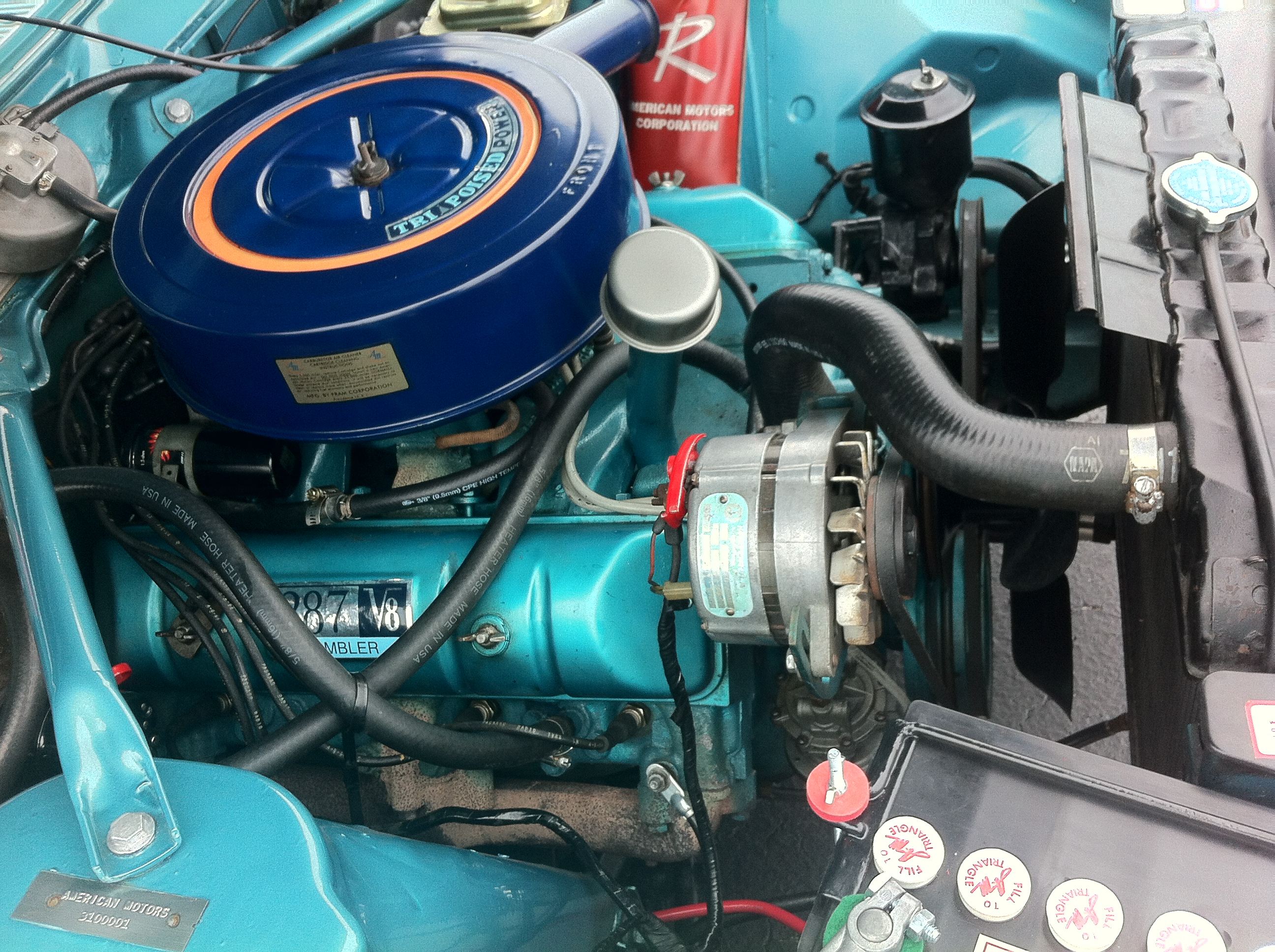
Engine bay with AMC 287 V8

The 250 engine was discontinued in 1961. A V8 engine was not offered on Rambler models, except for the 327, which was available only on the top-of-the-line Ambassador series.

Dealers complained about the lack of V8 engine, so the 287 cu in (4.7 L) V8 was introduced in mid-model year 1963 as an option for the "mid-size" Rambler. Like the 327, it uses hydraulic valve lifters. Only two-barrel versions were produced, there were no four-barrel options from the factory for the 287 because this was the positioned as the economy V8. The 287 engine was produced through the 1966 model year.

=== 327 ===
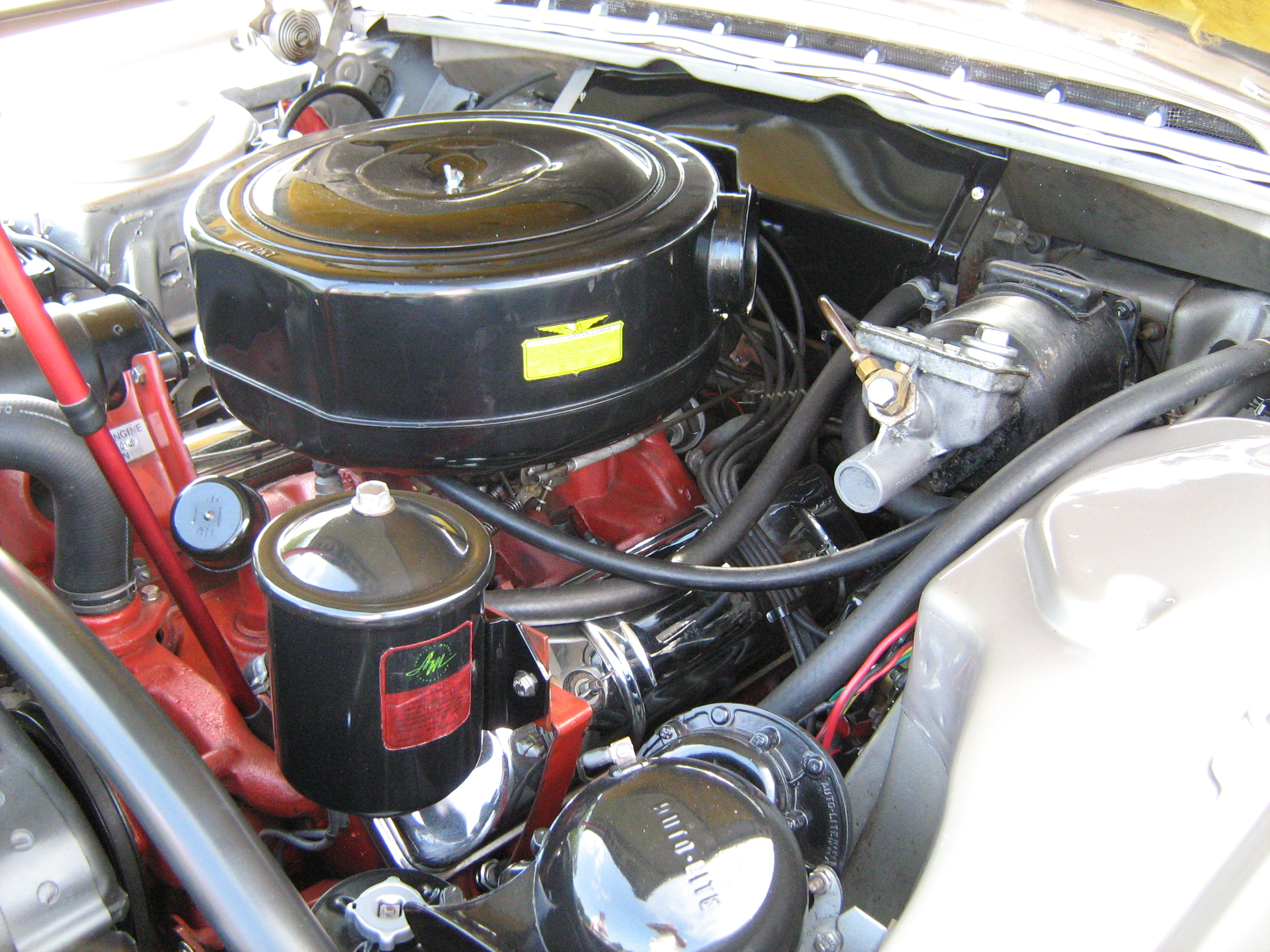
The AMC 327 V8 debuted in the 1957 Rambler Rebel, an early "muscle car"

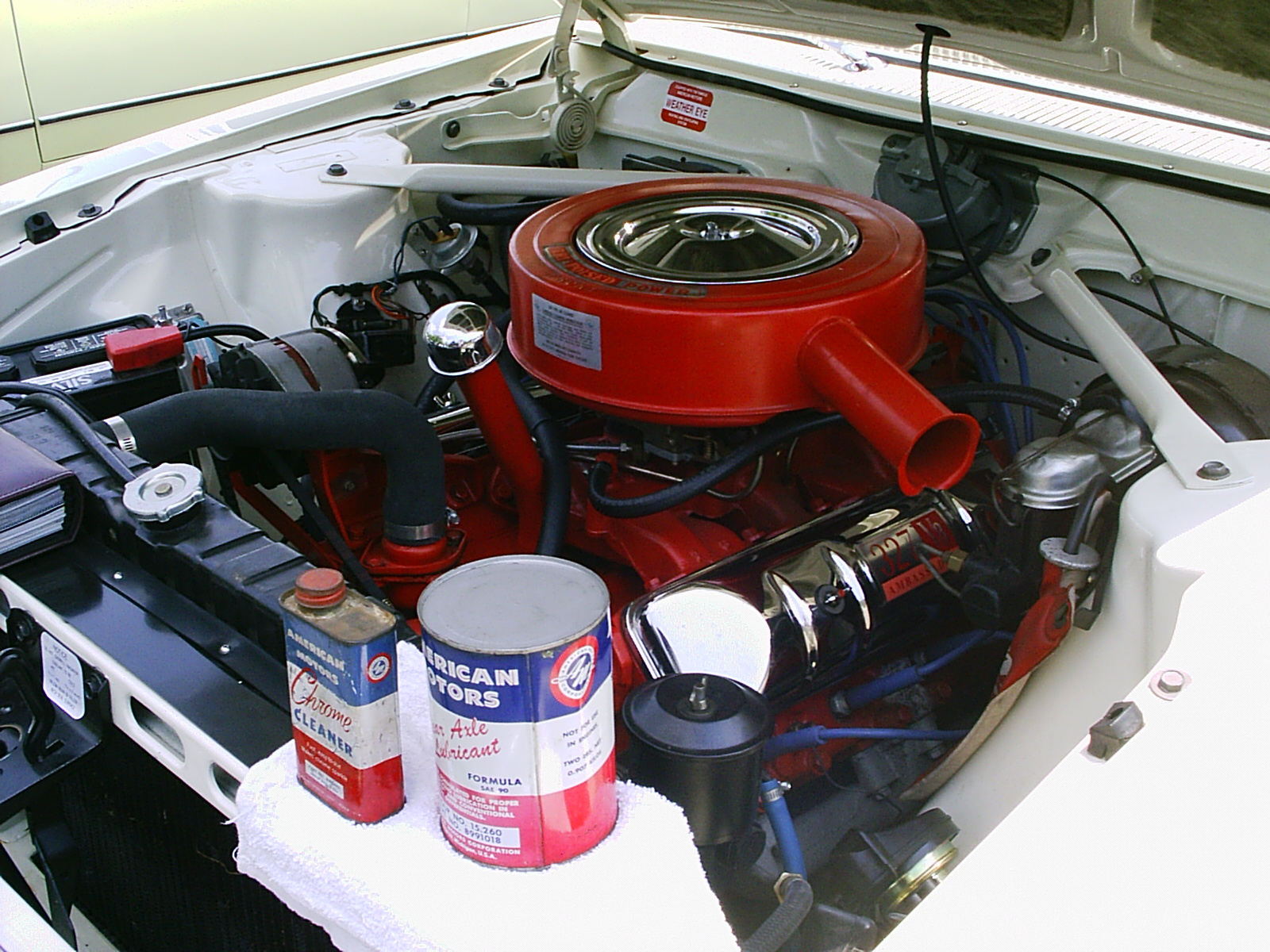
Engine bay of a 1963 AMC Ambassador with a 327 V8 four-barrel

The AMC 327 cu in (5.4 L) is similar to the 287, but its larger displacement is due to the bore increase to 4 inches (101.6 mm). Unlike the 250, most 327s were produced with hydraulic valve lifters. All Gray Marine 327s came with solid lifters, as did the 1957 Rebel.

The AMC V8 is not related or manufactured by Chevrolet, whose 327 V8 was introduced five years later in 1962.

The AMC 327 engine debuted in a special-edition 1957 Rambler Rebel, of which 1,500 were built. They were an early American muscle car. All Rebels had silver paint with a gold-anodized "spear" on each side. The 327 was not available in any other Rambler models in 1957. The Rebel's engine differs from the 327s installed in the 1957 Nash Ambassador and Hudson Hornet models in that it uses mechanical valve lifters and a higher compression ratio. Since both engines were rated at 255 hp (190 kW), the Rebel's was probably underrated.

The Nash Ambassador and Hudson Hornet "Special" models were dropped after 1957, replaced by the 1958 Rambler Rebel with the 250 V8. The Rebel was a V8 version of the Rambler six and included associated upgrades such as stronger front springs and a stronger rear axle. The Rebel model name also differentiated it from the standard six-cylinder Rambler. The big Nash and Hudson cars were also dropped after 1957, replaced by the 1958 "Ambassador by Rambler" — a stretched Rebel with the 327 V8 instead of the 250. The 327 was exclusive to the Ambassador line and could not be ordered in a Rebel (or later Classic) through 1964. For 1965 and 1966, the 287 and 327 were both available in the Classic and Ambassador.

The AMC 327 was sold to Kaiser-Jeep from 1965 until 1967 for use in the Jeep Wagoneer SUV and Gladiator pick-up truck. Jeep named it the "Vigilante" V8. Two-barrel carburation was standard on these Jeep models, but a four-barrel high-compression version was available in the highly optioned Super Wagoneer from 1966 until 1968. Kaiser-Jeep switched to the Buick 350 in 1967 after AMC discontinued the 327. The Buick V8 engine option continued through 1971, after which Jeeps returned to AMC V8 engines, American Motors having purchased Jeep from Kaiser in 1970.

There were low- and high-compression versions of the 327 starting in 1960. Prior to 1960, all 327s were high compression. All low-compression models used a two-barrel carburetor and all high-compression models received a four-barrel carb. The low compression of 8.7:1 and high of 9.7:1 was affected by a difference in pistons.

The AMC 327 was also offered as a marine engine as the "Fireball" by Gray Marine Motor Company.

=== Electronic fuel injection ===
The AMC 327 was to be the first commercial electronic fuel injected (EFI) "Electrojector" production engine. Press reports about the Bendix-developed system in December 1956 were followed in March 1957 by an AMC price bulletin offering the EFI option on the Rambler Rebel for US$395, but due to supplier difficulties, fuel-injected Rebels were only available after June 15. Teething problems with the Electrojector unit meant that only a few engineering and press cars were built, estimated to be no more than six units. At least two pre-production Rebels with EFI, however, are known to have been built. One was sent to Daytona Beach, Florida for "Speed Week" (the forerunner of today's Daytona 500). It was the second fastest car on the beach, bested only by a 1957 Chevrolet Corvette with mechanical fuel injection, and only by a couple of tenths of a second.

The EFI 327 was rated at 288 hp (215 kW; 292 PS) and the regular four-barrel carbureted model at 255 hp (190 kW; 259 PS). The EFI system in the Rebel was a far more-advanced setup than the mechanical types then appearing on the market and the engines ran fine in warm weather, but suffered hard starting in cooler temperatures. All the EFI cars were reportedly converted to four-barrel carbs before being sold; none are known to have existed outside the engineering department at AMC.

The main problem was that early electronics were not fast enough for "on the fly" engine controls. This setup was utilized by Chrysler for the 1958 model year on its Dodge, Chrysler, Plymouth, and DeSoto carlines. It too failed, having the same problems.

Bendix licensed patents based on their 1950s design (patent dated 1960) to Bosch, who perfected it as the basis for their D-Jetronic, et seq. injections system, first used in 1967.

=== Marine application ===
The 250 and 327 were also offered as a marine engines marketed as "Fireball" by the Gray Marine Motor Company starting in 1958. Gray started offering the 250 in 1959. The 250 was offered in 135, 160, 170, 175, 178, and 185 horsepower versions. The 327 was made in 188, 215, 220, 225, and 238 horsepower levels. Gray used the 250 through 1966. The 327 was used as a 220 hp model in 1967, the last year an AMC V8 was used.

== Gen-2 AMC short-deck V8 (1966–1969) ==
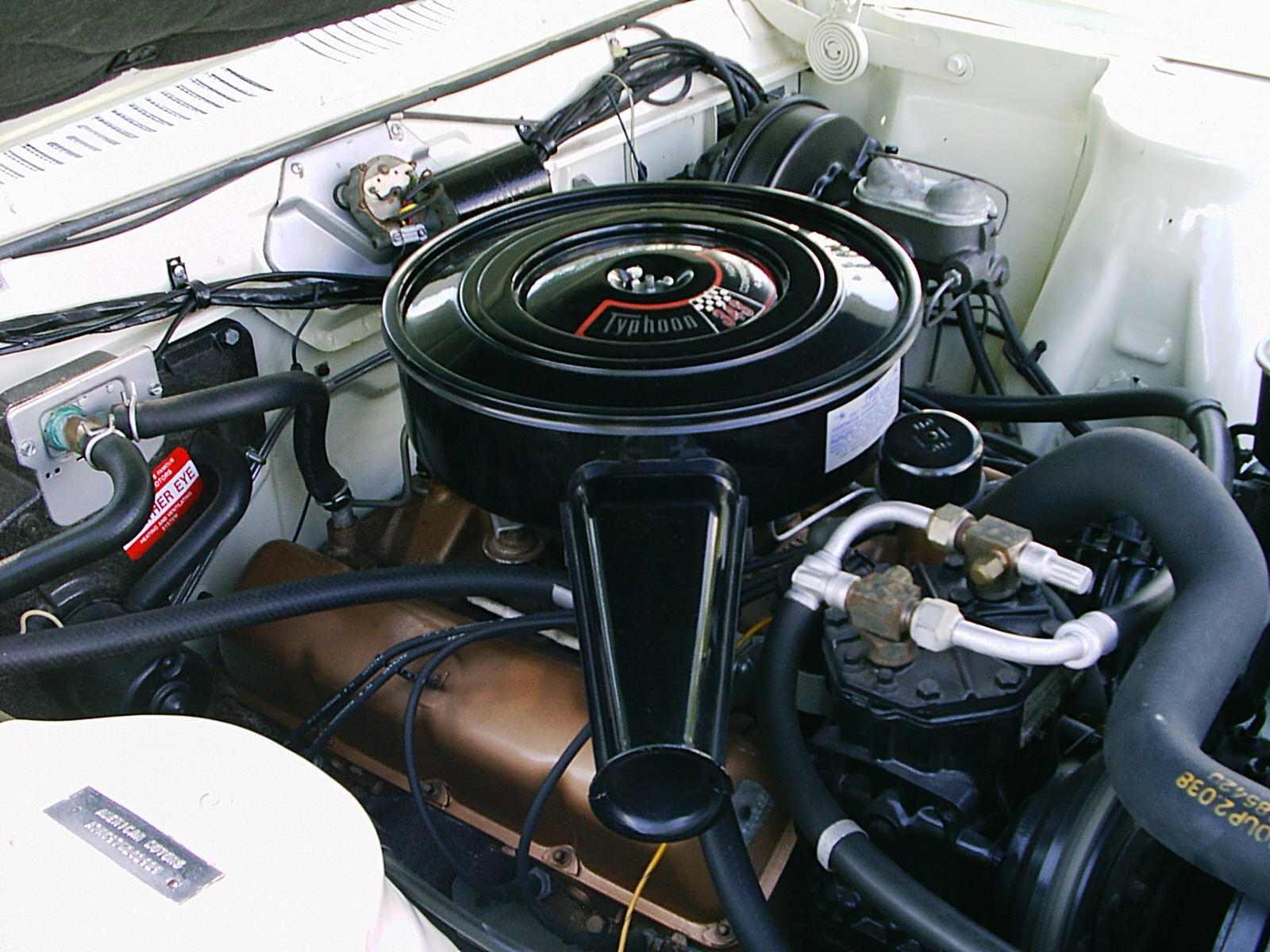
Engine bay of a 1967 AMC Marlin with a 4-barrel 343 Typhoon V8

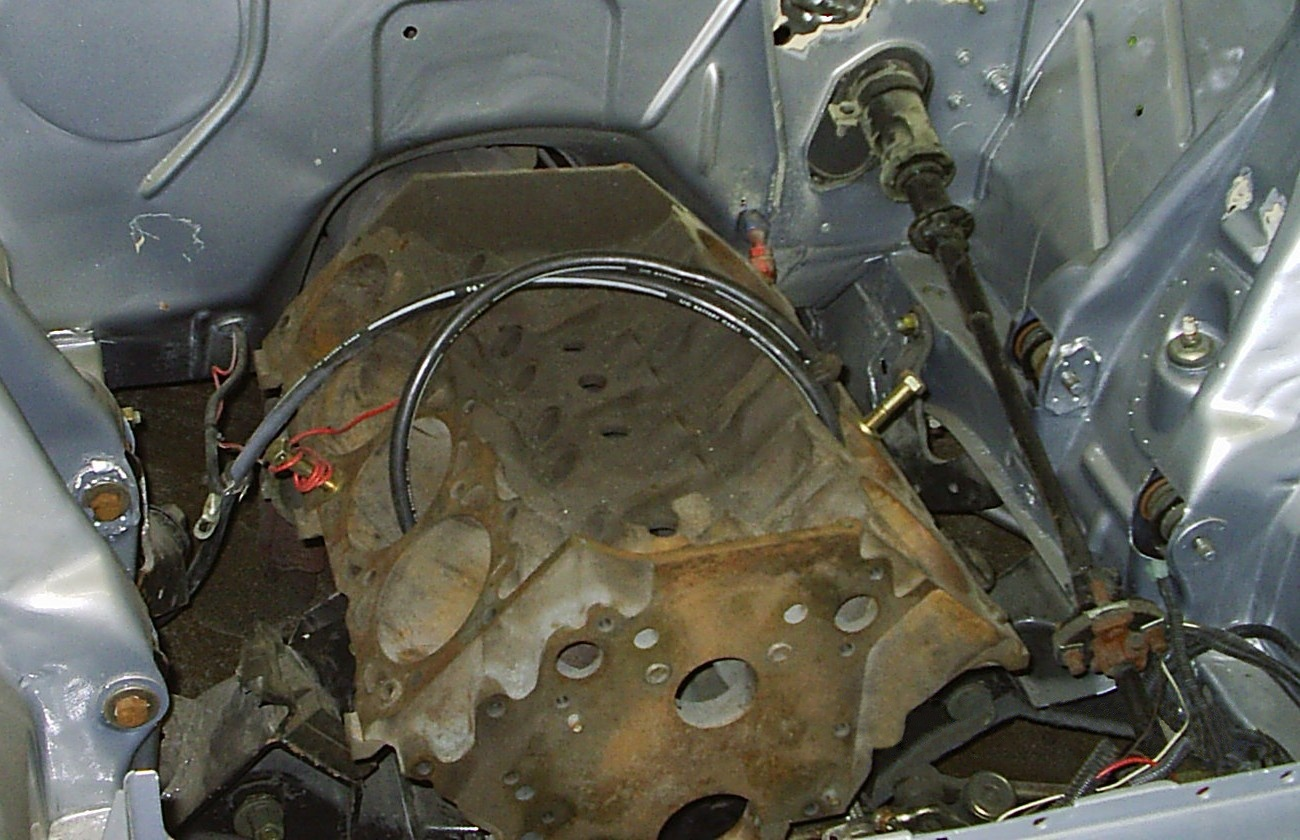
Engine bay of a 1969 AMC AMX with a bare V8 block

The new-generation AMC V8 was introduced in 1966. It is referred to as the "Gen-2" AMC V8. American Motors kept the 4.75 in (121 mm) cylinder-bore centers in the new engines to use existing tooling and equipment. However, everything else in the engine was reengineered with only the timing chain and drive sprocket interchanged with the previous design.

The second-generation engine is vastly different from the Gen-1 model. The previously rear of the camshaft mounted distributor and oil pump were moved to the front. The aluminum housing for them also carried the water pump. The size and weight of the entire engine was trimmed by use of thinwall techniques, a reduced 9.165 in (232.8 mm) deck height, as well as by reengineering the cylinder block and head castings. The Gen-1 engine is physically the size of a big-block Ford or GM engine, and is sometimes called a "big-block". The Gen-2 is closer to the physical size of U.S.-made small-block V8s except for the bore centers, which are the same as some big-block engines.

The AMX 390 V8 was not built by Ford. It bears a resemblance to the later Buick V8 engines (400, 430, 455). It shares the same design employing a timing gear case that mounts both the distributor and oil pump. It also shares the same oiling scheme employing a single passage to feed both cam and crank from the right lifter bank by tangentially intersecting the cam bore instead of two drilled passages, one from the cam to crank and another from the crank to the right lifter bank. Some electrical parts (starter and distributor) were shared with Ford, and some models used Motorcraft (Ford) carburetors, but the balance of the engine design is unique.

The first version was the completely new 290 cu in (4.8 L) Typhoon V8 introduced in a special mid-1966 model year "Rogue" hardtop. Available in 200 hp (149 kW; 203 PS) two-barrel carburetor version or producing 225 hp (168 kW; 228 PS) with a four-barrel carburetor and high compression, the new engines utilized "thin-wall" casting technology and weighed only 540 pounds (245 kg).

The 343 cu in (5.6 L) version was introduced for the 1967 model year and the high-performance "AMX" 390 cu in (6.4 L) V8 arrived in mid-1968. These engine blocks were unchanged through the 1969 model year. All three engines share the same basic block design and external measurements; the different displacements are achieved through various bore and stroke combinations.

The head used during this time was the so-called "rectangle port", named after its exhaust port shape. The 290 heads use smaller valves, 1.787 in (45.4 mm) intake and 1.406 in (35.7 mm) exhaust, corresponding with its small bore. The 343 and the AMX 390 use the same larger valve heads, 2.025 in (51.4 mm) intake and 1.625 in (41.3 mm) exhaust.

=== 290 ===
The base 290 cu in (4.8 L) produced 200 or 225 hp (149 or 168 kW) with a two-barrel or four-barrel carburetor, respectively. It was built from the mid-1966 model year through the 1969 model year. It has a bore and stroke of 3.75 in × 3.28 in (95.3 mm × 83.3 mm). Only 623 cars were built in 1966 with the 290 engine. These engines were available in special Rambler American two-door Rogue models. The newly powered Rogue was available with either a three-speed automatic or a floor-mounted four-speed manual transmission and made the car "suitable for the Stoplight Grand Prix."

=== 343 ===
The 343 cu in (5.6 L) has a bore and stroke of 4.08 in × 3.28 in (103.6 mm × 83.3 mm). The basic 343/2V produced 235 hp (175 kW; 238 PS) and was built from 1967 through 1969. Output for the optional four-barrel carburetor version is 280 hp (209 kW; 284 PS) and produces 365 lb⋅ft (495 N⋅m) of torque (gross). This version has a 10.2:1 compression ratio.

=== AMX 390 ===
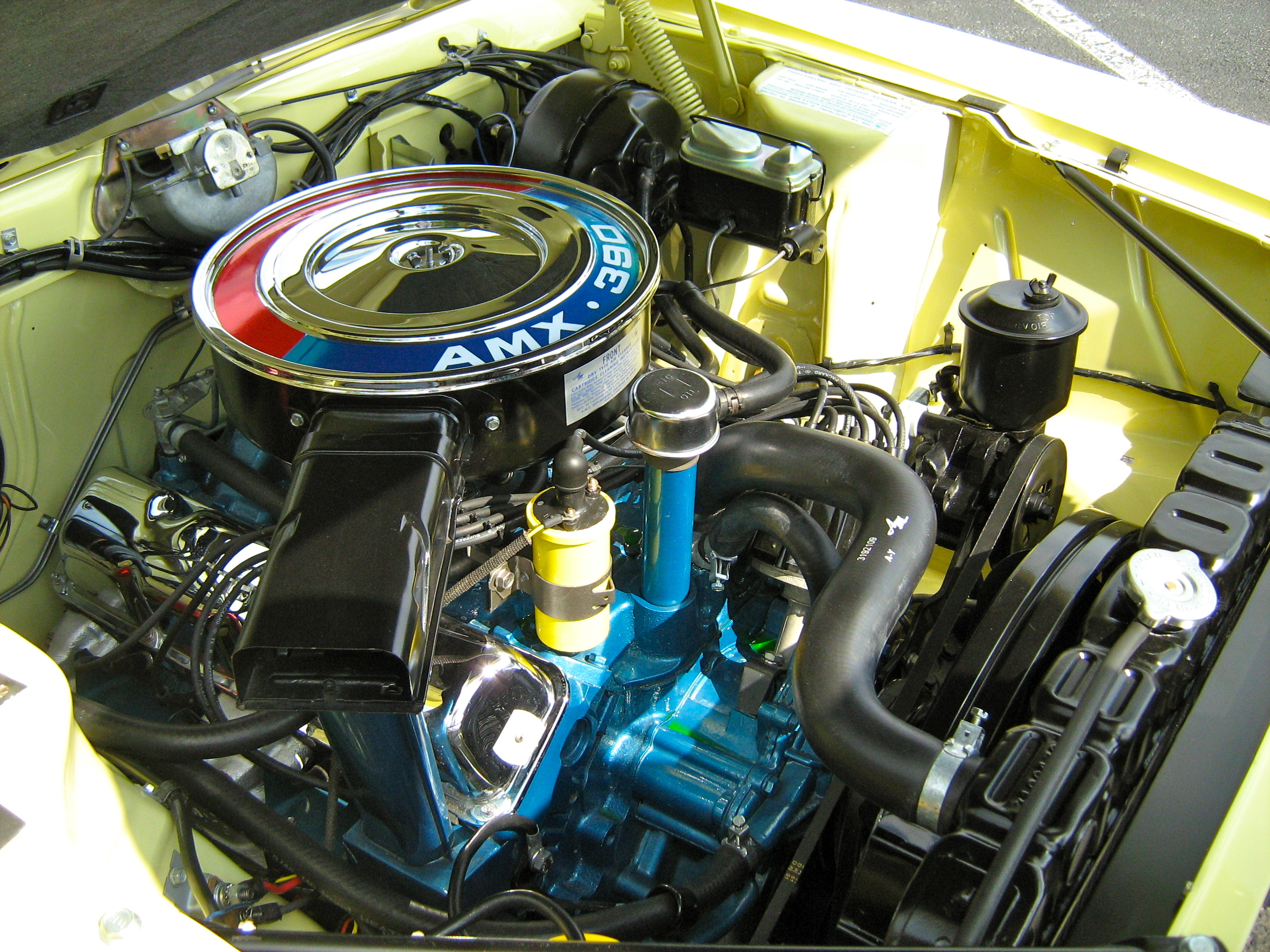
The AMX 390 engine in a 1968 AMX

The 390 cu in (6.4 L) AMX engine had a bore and stroke of 4.165 in × 3.574 in (105.8 mm × 90.8 mm). It received heavier main bearing support webbing than the smaller AMC V8s, as well as a forged steel crankshaft and connecting rods. Forged cranks and rods were used for their known strength—there was inadequate time for testing cast parts for durability without delaying AMC's introduction schedule. Once forging dies were made it was not cost-effective to test cast parts due to the relatively low number of engines produced. The use of these stronger components was also continued with the production of 401 engines. This is an advantage of these AMC engines when used in heavy-duty and high-performance applications because they have no problems with their connecting rods breaking; unlike other domestic automakers' large displacement small block engines. The Gen-2 AMX 390 produced 315 hp (235 kW; 319 PS) and was built in 1968 and 1969.

== Gen-3 AMC tall-deck (1970–1991) ==
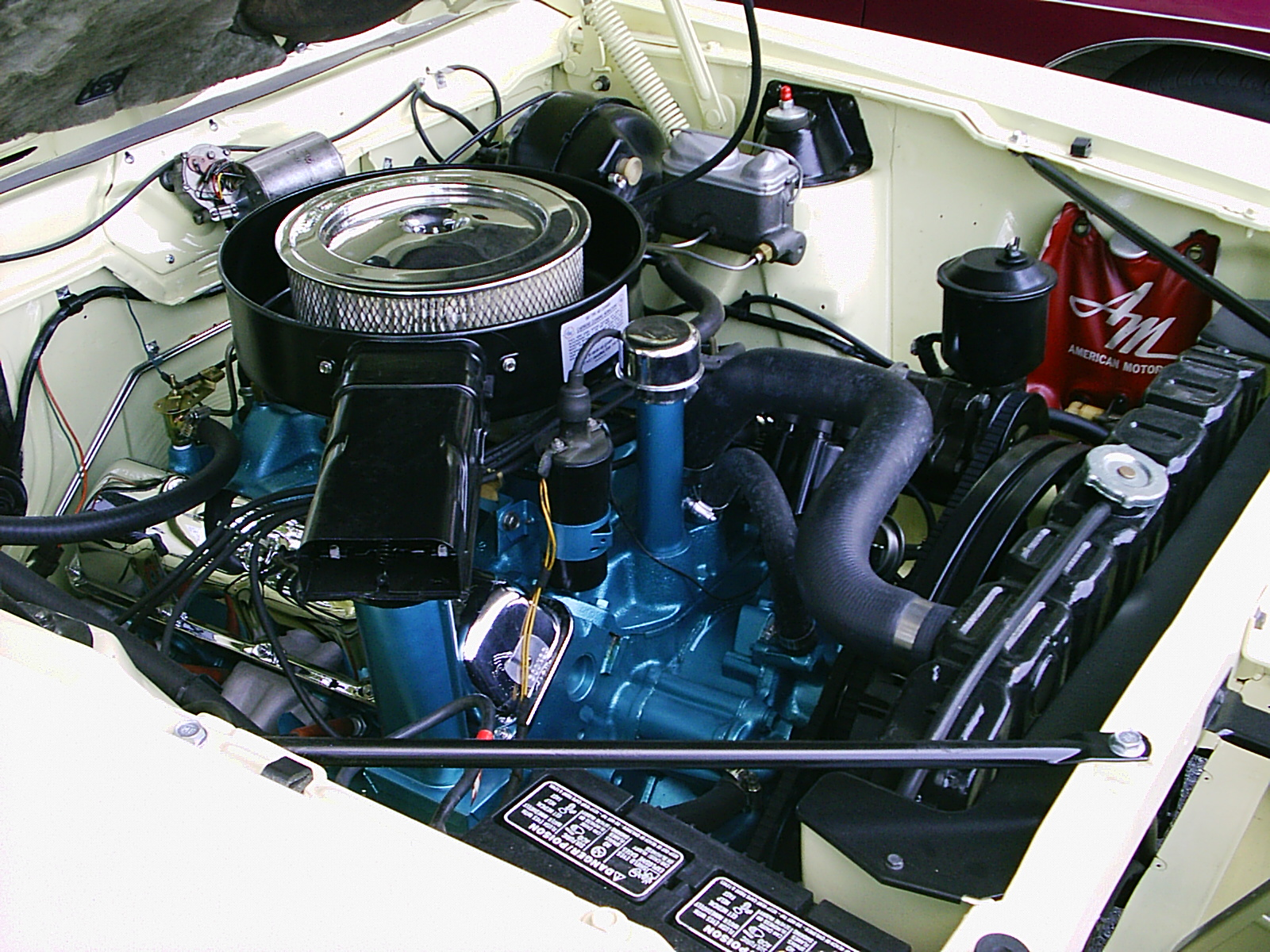
Engine bay of a 1970 Javelin with a Ram Air 390 V8

In 1970, all three blocks grew in deck height and gained a new head design. Although the engine is an outgrowth of the Gen-2 V8, these changes cause it to be regarded as the third generation of AMC V8, or "Gen-3". The stroke and deck height on the 290 and 343 were increased by 0.16 in (4.06 mm) on both engines, becoming the 304 cu in (5.0 L) and 360 cu in (5.9 L), respectively. The 1970 AMX 390 remained at the same displacement by using a special connecting rod and piston for this year only. It is believed that AMC kept the 390 this last year due to the reputation it had garnered in the two-seater AMX, then still in production. (It was discontinued after 1970). In 1971 the 390 was also stroked by the same 0.16 in (4.06 mm) as the other two versions of the engine to become the 401.

The other change in 1970 was the switch to the "dog-leg" heads. These heads flow 20% better on the exhaust side than the 1966-1969 rectangular port heads and are thus the best for performance. There are two reasons for the flow increase: (1) the area of the port is larger, due to the dog leg and (2) the shape of the port floor was changed from a concave to a convex curve. The concave floor tended to bend the exhaust flow upwards which caused turbulence when the flow was forced to go down into the exhaust manifolds. By switching to a convex floor the curvature of the flow starts in the head and proceeds much more smoothly into the exhaust manifold resulting in less turbulence and better flow.

The center two intake bolts on each head were relocated to prevent accidental mix-ups of Gen-2 and Gen-3 intakes.

AMC heads 319 and 291 used between 1970-mid 1971 have the dog-leg exhaust ports and 50-52 cc combustion chambers. They are commonly identified by the first three (319) or last three (291 for the 360-401 heads; 304 used a different casting) digits of the casting number. There was a U.S. auto industry-wide shift to lower compression ratios in mid-1971, so AMC increased combustion chamber size to 58-59 cc. The first three digits of the casting number on the large chamber heads are 321, 322, or 323 depending on year. The only difference between small and large chamber Gen-3 heads is the combustion chamber size.

The advertised power drop from the 1971 ratings to the ones for the 1972 model years (for example, the 1971 304 produced 210 hp and the 1972 304 was 150 hp) is not due to any engine changes, but an industry-wide shift from SAE Gross (also known as "brake horsepower" or "bhp") to SAE Net power ratings. The 1971 and 1972 engines produce the same power. The 1971 and earlier versions were rated using "gross" horsepower, which is with the engines operating with no accessories or drive belts, air filters, nor any exhaust system restrictions. The change to the more realistic "net" horsepower ratings for 1972 and later required the engine to be driving all stock factory accessories and to use the factory air filter system and a simulated factory exhaust. Power is measured at the flywheel for both systems. For example, even with the modifications to reduce emissions and increase efficiency, AMC's 401 cu in (6.6 L) engine was among the strongest factory-spec engines available in an American car in 1971, with more horsepower than Pontiac's standard 455 cu in (7.5 L) and Chevrolet's 454 cu in (7.4 L) that powered the Corvette.

=== 304 ===
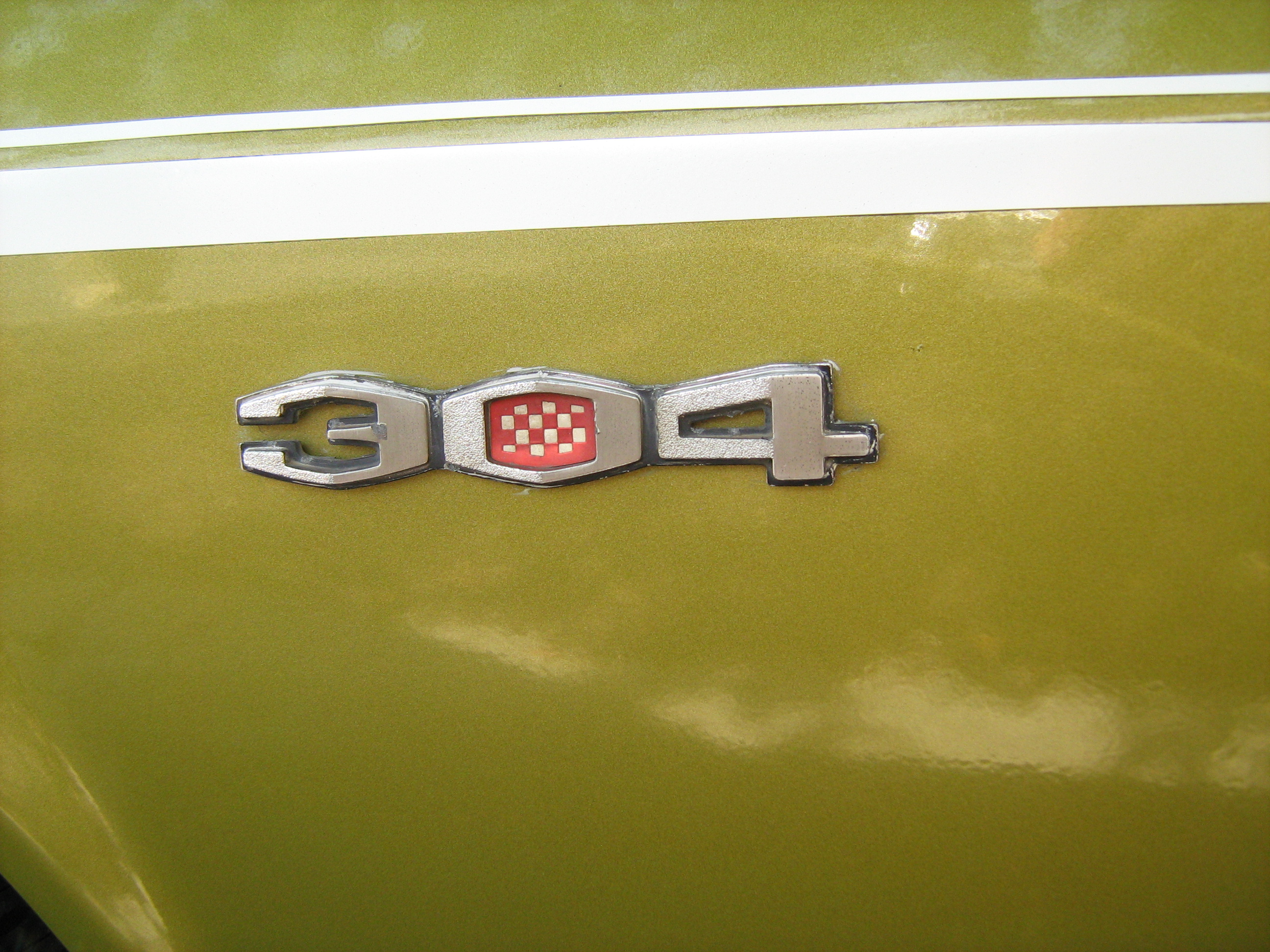
1970 emblem

The 304 has a displacement of 304 cu in (5.0 L), which produced 210 hp (157 kW; 213 PS)(gross rating) in 1970-71 and was built starting in 1970. Output declined yearly thereafter, initially due a shift from SAE Gross to SAE Net horsepower. 1972-75 models were rated at 150 hp (112 kW; 152 PS) (net rating from 1972 onwards). It was rated at 130.5 hp (97 kW; 132 PS) in 1978, and 125 hp (93 kW; 127 PS) in 1979, the last year it was installed in passenger cars, and in 1980–81, the last years it was used in Jeep vehicles. The International Harvester Corporation 304-cubic-inch (5.0 L) SV "Comanche" V8 engines are sometimes mistaken for the AMC 304, however, the IHC V8 engine family has no relation to the AMC V8 and was in fact first produced in 1959, 11 years prior to the AMC designed 304. The similarity in displacement is purely a coincidence.

=== 360 ===
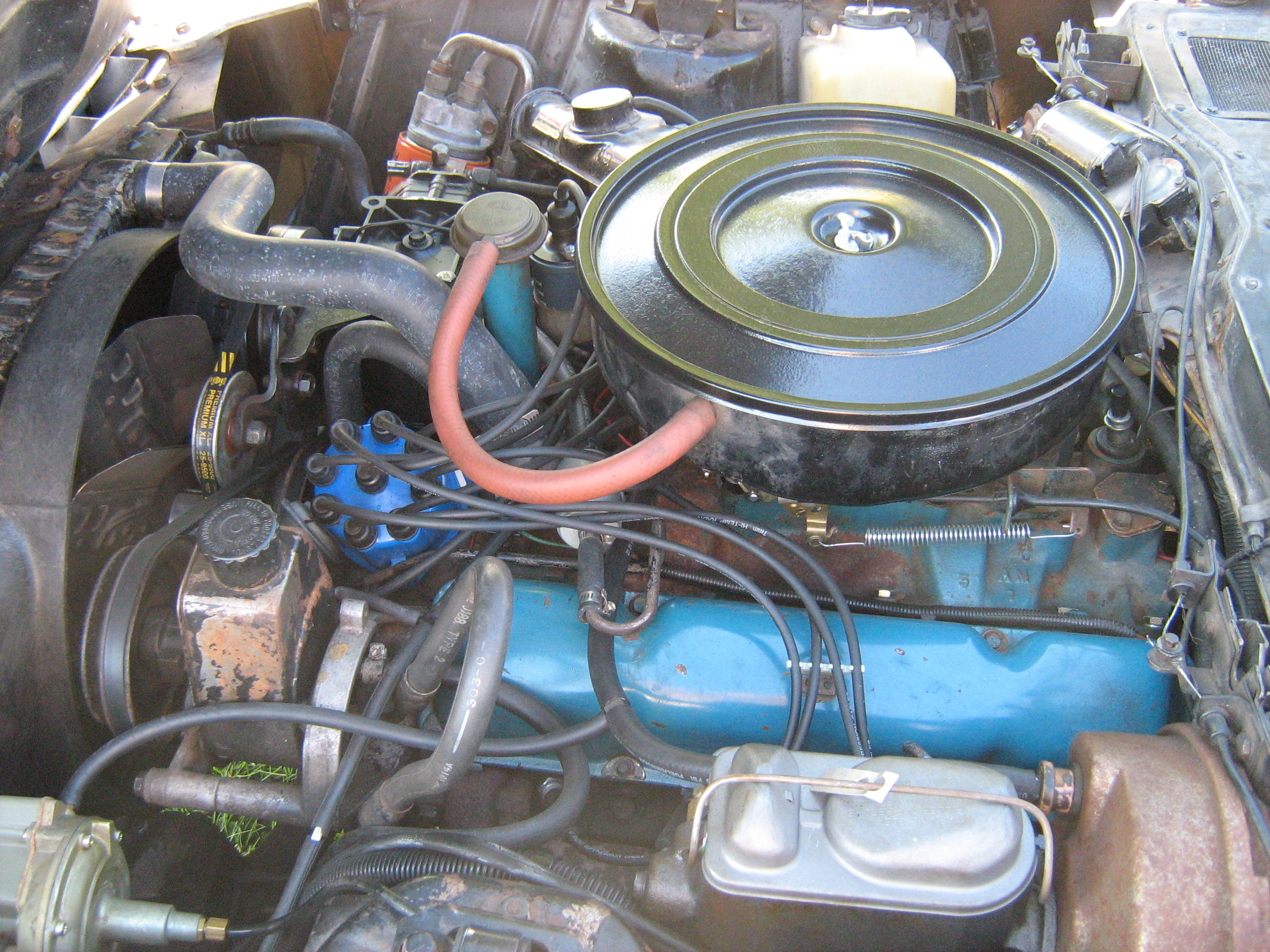
The AMC 360 V8 was standard in the 1974 Bricklin SV-1 sports car

The AMC 360 has a displacement of 359.80 cu in (5,896.1 cc). The 2-barrel produced 235 hp (175 kW; 238 PS) to 245 hp (183 kW; 248 PS) in 1970 to early 1971 while the 4-barrel produced 285 hp (213 kW; 289 PS) to 295 hp (220 kW; 299 PS), 175 hp (130 kW; 177 PS) to 220 hp (164 kW; 223 PS) from mid-1971 through 1975, 140 hp (104 kW; 142 PS) to 180 hp (134 kW; 182 PS) in 1976, 129 hp (96 kW; 131 PS) in 1977, and 160 hp (119 kW; 162 PS) from 1978 through 1991.

This engine was used in the 1970 AMX as the base engine and also in the 1970 Rebel, the 1971 through 1978 Matador, Jeep J-series trucks from 1970 until 1987, Wagoneer (SJ) models from 1972 until 1984, Cherokee (SJ) from 1974 until 1983, as well as in the full-sized Grand Wagoneer from 1984 through 1991 - becoming one of the last carbureted engines used in an American-built vehicle. The 360 V8 was also installed in the Bricklin SV-1 sports car for the 1974 model year.

The 360 was the last AMC V8 to be manufactured. It continued to be produced after Chrysler bought American Motors in 1987 as the standard engine in the Jeep Grand Wagoneer through 1991, with the only modification being the "360" casting replaced with "5.9L" on the side of the block.

=== 390 ===
The 390 cu in (6.4 L) AMC V8 produced 325 hp (330 PS; 242 kW) and 420 lb⋅ft (569 N⋅m; 58 kg⋅m) of torque in all except the Rebel Machine. This muscle car engine was rated at 340 hp (345 PS; 254 kW) and 430 lb⋅ft (583 N⋅m; 59 kg⋅m) of torque due to a different intake. Production only lasted one year (1970) before it was stroked to become the 401 cu in (6.6 L).

=== 401 ===
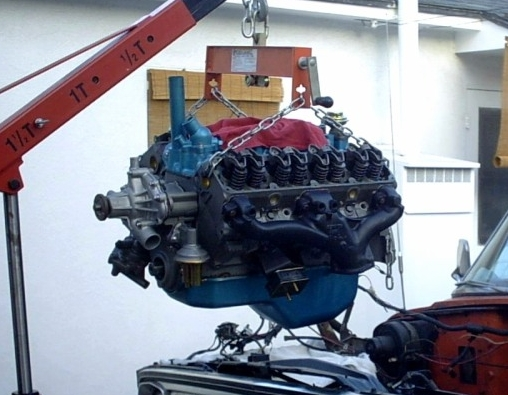
1974 AMC 401

The 401.11 cu in (6,573.0 cc) produced 330 hp (335 PS; 246 kW) gross in 1971 and 255 hp (259 PS; 190 kW) net from 1972 through 1975. In 1976 it was rated at 215 hp (218 PS; 160 kW). Like the 390, the 401's crankshaft and connecting rods are forged steel. It was last produced in 1978.

The 401 was available in the Javelin, Matador, and Ambassador car lines and in Jeeps from its introduction in 1971 through 1974. In 1975 and 1976, emission controls, insurance rates, and high gasoline prices meant the 401 was available on the large Matador model, and then only for police department orders. Buyers of full-sized Jeeps (Wagoneer, Cherokee, J-10, and J-20) could order a 401 until 1978 (not available in 1979). This engine was also supplied to International Harvester for use as an optional engine in International's Light Line pickup trucks and Travelalls from late 1973 through 1974 where it was designated 'V-400' to differentiate it from IHC's own V/LV series 401.

=== "Service replacement" blocks ===
There was also a "Service Replacement" block made as a modified GEN-3 design. This is a 401 casting (same casting number) without the displacement cast into the side and with a 360 bore and thicker deck. In theory, this single block could be built as any 343-401 GEN-2 or GEN-3 engine. A dealer could stock one or two blocks to use for warranty replacement.

The main bearing web area was thicker in the 390, 401, and SR blocks, thick enough that two additional bearing cap bolt holes could be drilled and tapped for an aftermarket four-bolt main cap, providing a stronger bottom end. AMC never built a factory four-bolt main block, they sold aftermarket four-bolt main caps through their Group 19 performance parts program.

The SR block was also sold as a heavy-duty racing block. It appeared in 1970 in time for the 1971 Trans-Am racing season and was used in the factory Trans-Am backed cars prepared by TRACO for Penske Racing, with Mark Donohue the primary driver. Since it was a standard factory part it did not have to be homologated under T/A rules, and was not used in the 2501 "Mark Donohue" Javelins built to homologate the "ducktail" spoiler. Those received standard 360 or 390 engines, buyers' choice.

== Engine specs ==
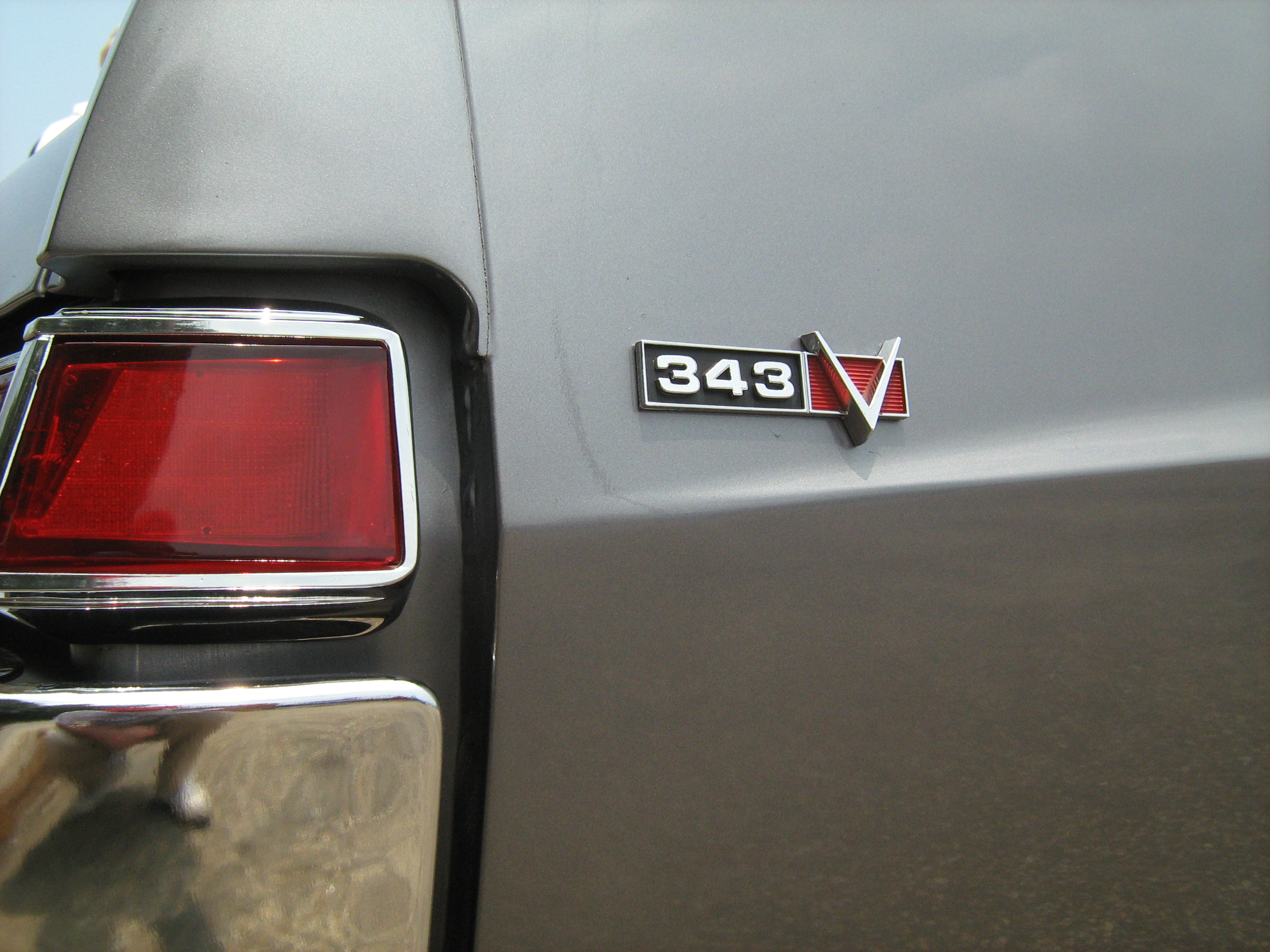
1968-1969 emblem for 343 equipped cars

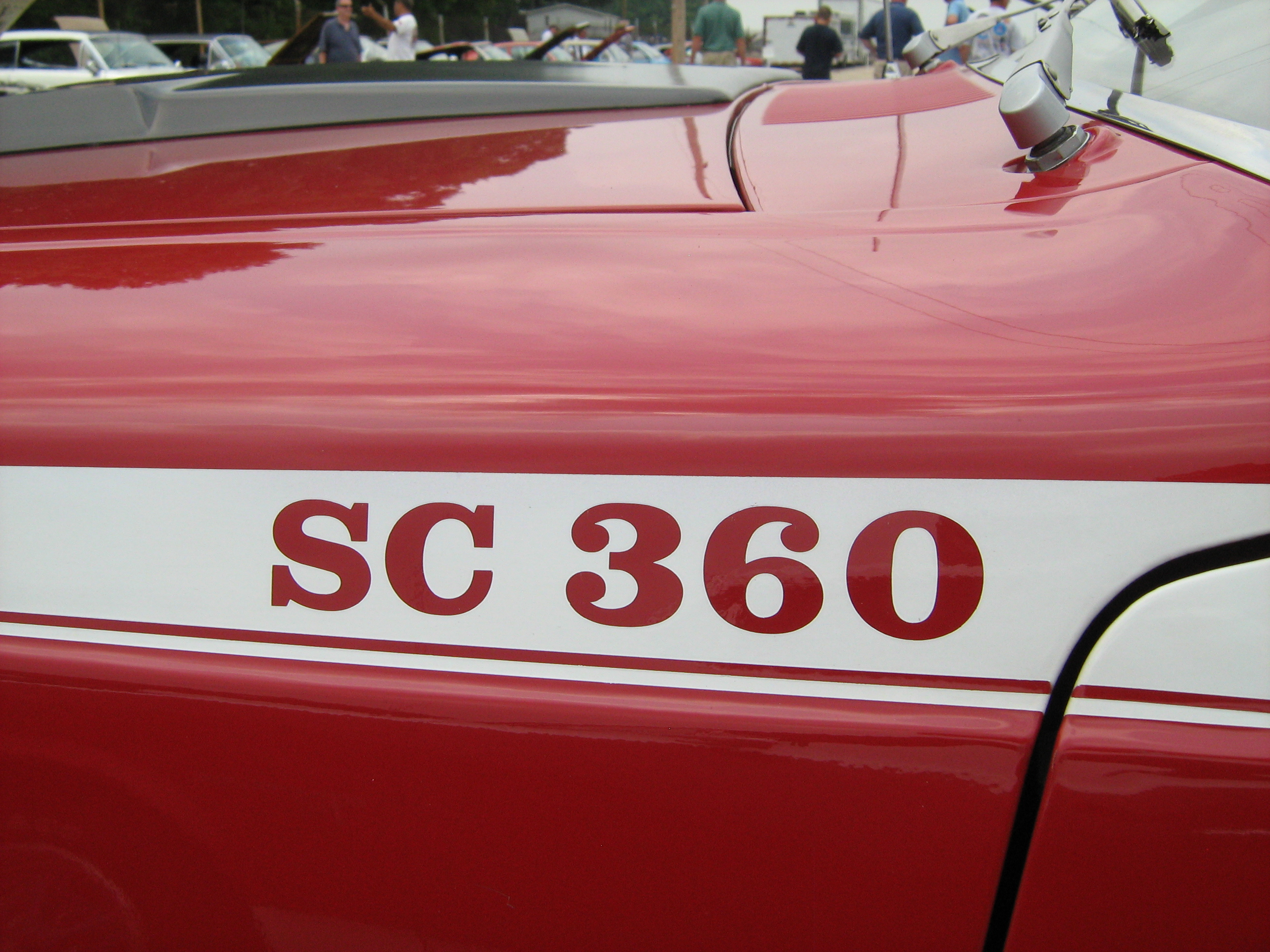
1971 Hornet SC stripe with "360" cut out

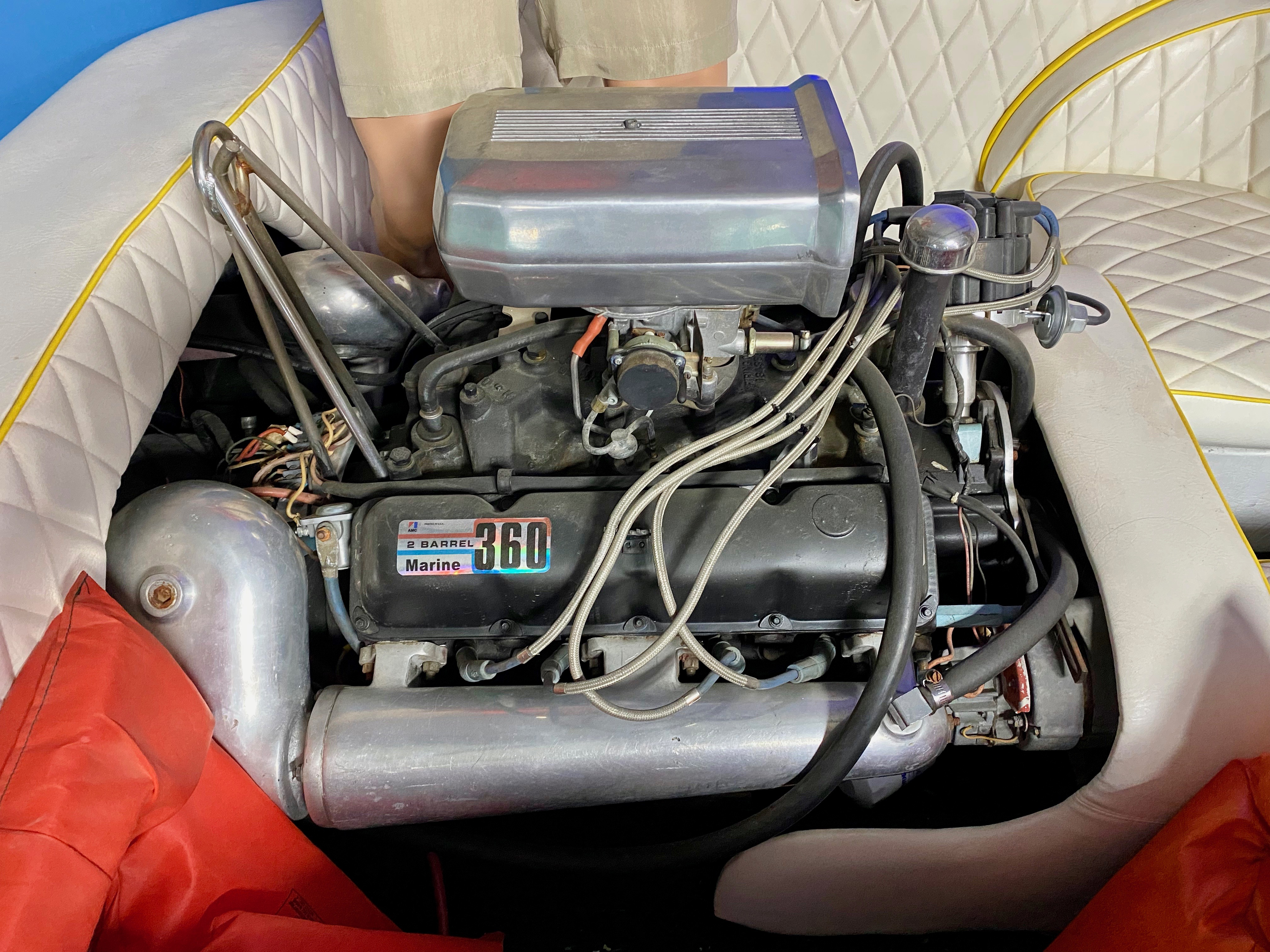
360 2-barrel marine engine in a boat

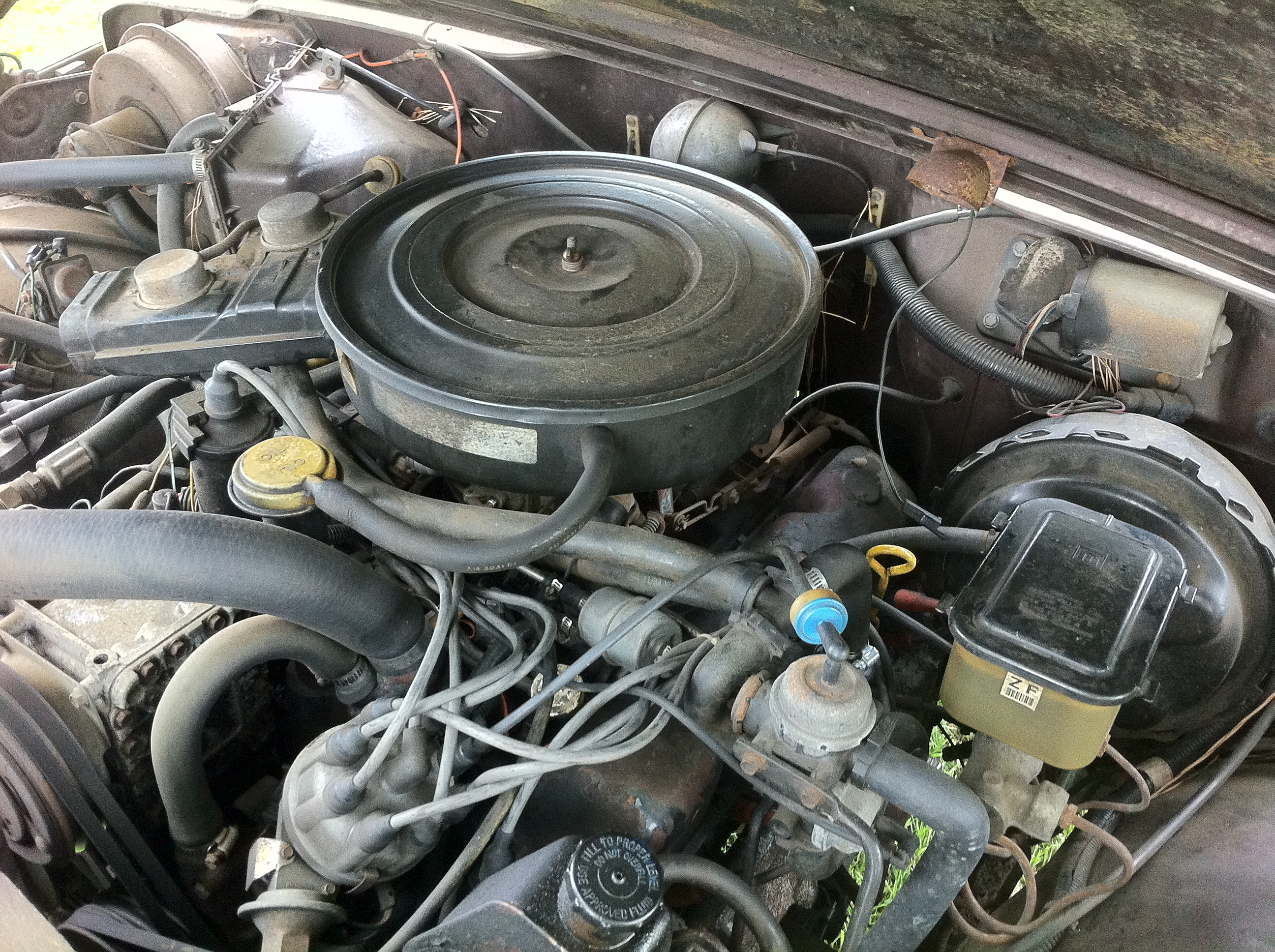
360 engine in a Jeep J-10 pickup

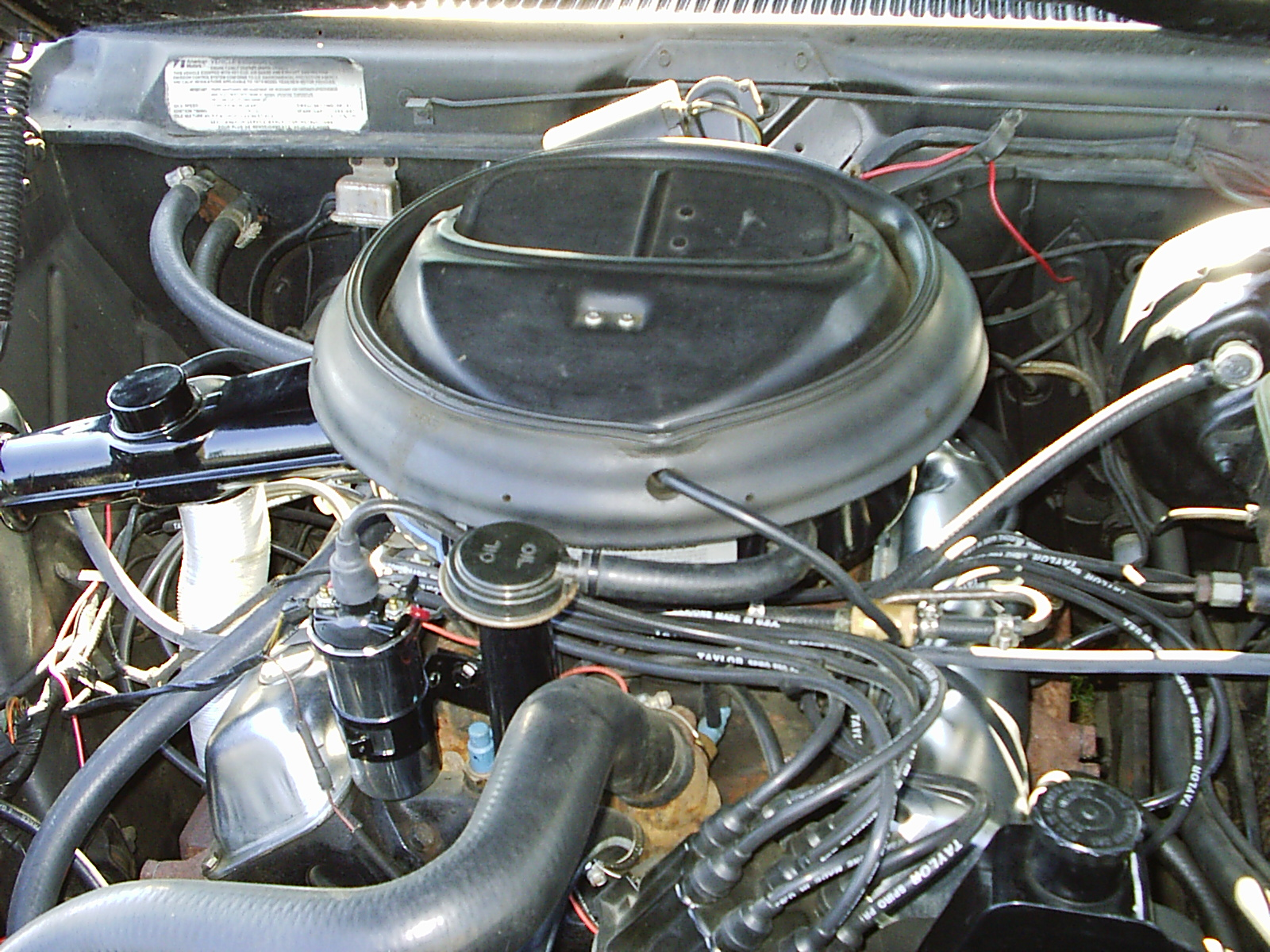
1973 Ram Air 401 engine in a Javelin AMX

Note: Prior to 1972 figures are rated using SAE gross. Later engines use the current SAE net rating.

AMC V8 hp, torque, compression, and bore-stroke by year
Year	Displac.-Carb.	Power hp (kW)	Torque lb·ft (N·m)	Comp. ratio	Bore in (mm)	Stroke in (mm)
1966	287-2B	198 (148) at 4700	280 (380) at 2600	8.7:1	3.75 (95.3)	3.25 (82.6)
1966	327-2B	250 (186) at 4700	340 (461) at 2600	8.7:1	4 (101.6)	3.25 (82.6)
1966	327-4B	270 (201) at 4700	360 (488) at 2600	9.7:1	4 (101.6)	3.25 (82.6)
1967	290-2B	200 (149) at 4700	285 (386) at 2800	8.7:1	3.75 (95.3)	3.28 (83.3)
1967	290-4B	225 (168) at 4800	300 (407) at 3200	10.0:1	3.75 (95.3)	3.28 (83.3)
1967	343-2B	235 (175) at 4400	345 (468) at 2600	8.7:1	4.08 (103.6)	3.28 (83.3)
1967	343-4B	280 (209) at 4800	365 (495) at 3000	10.2:1	4.08 (103.6)	3.28 (83.3)
1968	290-2B	200 (149) at 4600	285 (386) at 2800	9.0:1	3.75 (95.3)	3.28 (83.3)
1968	290-4B	225 (168) at 4700	300 (407) at 3200	10.0:1	3.75 (95.3)	3.28 (83.3)
1968	343-2B	235 (175) at 4400	345 (468) at 2600	9.0:1	4.08 (103.6)	3.28 (83.3)
1968	343-4B	280 (209) at 4800	365 (495) at 3000	10.2:1	4.08 (103.6)	3.28 (83.3)
1968	390-4B	315 (235) at 4600	425 (576) at 3200	10.2:1	4.165 (105.8)	3.574 (90.8)
1969	290-2B	200 (149) at 4600	285 (386) at 2800	9.0:1	3.75 (95.3)	3.28 (83.3)
1969	290-4B	225 (168) at 4700	300 (407) at 3200	10.0:1	3.75 (95.3)	3.28 (83.3)
1969	343-2B	235 (175) at 4400	345 (468) at 2600	9.0:1	4.08 (103.6)	3.28 (83.3)
1969	343-4B	280 (209) at 4800	365 (495) at 3000	10.2:1	4.08 (103.6)	3.28 (83.3)
1969	390-4B	315 (235) at 4600	425 (576) at 3200	10.2:1	4.165 (105.8)	3.574 (90.8)
1969	390-4B (SS/AMX)	340 (254) at 4800	430 (583) at 3400	12.2:1	4.165 (105.8)	3.574 (90.8)
1970	304-2B	210 (157) at 4400	305 (413) at 2800	9.0:1	3.75 (95.3)	3.44 (87.4)
1970	360-2B	245 (183) at 4400	365 (495) at 2600	8.5:1	4.08 (103.6)	3.44 (87.4)
1970	360-4B (early)	290 (216) at 4800	390 (529) at 3000	10.2:1	4.08 (103.6)	3.44 (87.4)
1970	360-4B (late)	295 (220) at 4800	395 (536) at 3000	10.5:1	4.08 (103.6)	3.44 (87.4)
1970	390-4B	325 (242) at 5000	420 (569) at 3200	10.2:1	4.165 (105.8)	3.574 (90.8)
1970	390-4B (machine)	340 (254) at 5000	427 (579) at 3600	10.2:1	4.165 (105.8)	3.574 (90.8)
1971	304-2B	210 (157) at 4400	300 (407) at 2600	8.4:1	3.75 (95.3)	3.44 (87.4)
1971	360-2B	245 (183) at 4400	365 (495) at 2600	8.5:1	4.08 (103.6)	3.44 (87.4)
1971	360-4B (early)	295 (220) at 4800	395 (536) at 3000	10.5:1	4.08 (103.6)	3.44 (87.4)
1971	360-4B (late)	285 (212) at 4800	385 (522) at 3000	9.5:1	4.08 (103.6)	3.44 (87.4)
1971	401-4B (early)	335 (250) at 5000	435 (590) at 3400	10.2:1	4.165 (105.8)	3.68 (93.5)
1971	401-4B (late)	330 (246) at 5000	430 (583) at 3400	9.5:1	4.165 (105.8)	3.68 (93.5)
1972	304-2B	150 (112) at 4200	245 (332) at 2500	8.4:1	3.75 (95.3)	3.44 (87.4)
1972	360-2B	170 (127) at 4000	285 (386) at 2400	8.25:1	4.08 (103.6)	3.44 (87.4)
1972	360-4B	195 (145) at 4400	295 (400) at 2900	8.25:1	4.08 (103.6)	3.44 (87.4)
1972	360-4B (dual ex)	220 (164) at 4400	315 (427) at 3100	8.25:1	4.08 (103.6)	3.44 (87.4)
1972	401-4B	235 (175) at 4600		8.25:1	4.165 (105.8)	3.68 (93.5)
1972	401-4B (dual ex)	255 (190) at 4600	345 (468) at 3300	8.25:1	4.165 (105.8)	3.68 (93.5)
1973	304-2B	150 (112) at 4200	245 (332) at 2500	8.4:1	3.75 (95.3)	3.44 (87.4)
1973	360-2B	170 (127) at 4000	285 (386) at 2400	8.25:1	4.08 (103.6)	3.44 (87.4)
1973	360-4B	195 (145) at 4400	295 (400) at 2900	8.25:1	4.08 (103.6)	3.44 (87.4)
1973	360-4B (dual ex)	220 (164) at 4400	315 (427) at 3100	8.25:1	4.08 (103.6)	3.44 (87.4)
1973	401-4B	235 (175) at 4600		8.25:1	4.165 (105.8)	3.68 (93.5)
1973	401-4B (dual ex)	255 (190) at 4600	345 (468) at 3300	8.25:1	4.165 (105.8)	3.68 (93.5)
1974	304-2B	150 (112) at 4200	245 (332) at 2500	8.4:1	3.75 (95.3)	3.44 (87.4)
1974	360-2B	170 (127) at 4000	285 (386) at 2400	8.25:1	4.08 (103.6)	3.44 (87.4)
1974	360-4B	195 (145) at 4400	295 (400) at 2900	8.25:1	4.08 (103.6)	3.44 (87.4)
1974	360-4B (dual ex)	220 (164) at 4400	315 (427) at 3100	8.25:1	4.08 (103.6)	3.44 (87.4)
1974	401-4B	235 (175) at 4600		8.25:1	4.165 (105.8)	3.68 (93.5)
1974	401-4B (dual ex)	255 (190) at 4600	345 (468) at 3300	8.25:1	4.165 (105.8)	3.68 (93.5)
1975	304-2B	150 (112) at 4200	245 (332) at 2500	8.4:1	3.75 (95.3)	3.44 (87.4)
1975	360-2B	175 (130) at 4000	285 (386) at 2400	8.25:1	4.08 (103.6)	3.44 (87.4)
1975	360-4B	195 (145) at 4400	295 (400) at 2900	8.25:1	4.08 (103.6)	3.44 (87.4)
1975	360-4B (dual ex)	220 (164) at 4400	315 (427) at 3100	8.25:1	4.08 (103.6)	3.44 (87.4)
1975	401-4B	255 (190) at 4600	345 (468) at 3300	8.25:1	4.165 (105.8)	3.68 (93.5)
1976	304-2B	120 (89) at 3200	220 (298) at 2200	8.4:1	3.75 (95.3)	3.44 (87.4)
1976	360-2B	140 (104) at 4000	260 (353) at 2400	8.25:1	4.08 (103.6)	3.44 (87.4)
1976	360-4B	180 (134) at 4400	280 (380) at 2800	8.25:1	4.08 (103.6)	3.44 (87.4)
1976	401-4B	215 (160) at 4200	320 (434) at 2800	8.25:1	4.165 (105.8)	3.68 (93.5)
1977	304-2B	121 (90) at 3450	219 (297) at 2000	8.4:1	3.75 (95.3)	3.44 (87.4)
1977	360-2B	129 (96) at 3700	245 (332) at 1600	8.25:1	4.08 (103.6)	3.44 (87.4)
1977	360-4B	170 (127) at 3500	280 (380) at 2800	8.25:1	4.08 (103.6)	3.44 (87.4)
1977	401-4B	195 (145) at 3500	305 (413) at 2800	8.25:1	4.165 (105.8)	3.68 (93.5)
1978	304-2B	130 (97) at 3200	238 (323) at 2000	8.4:1	3.75 (95.3)	3.44 (87.4)
1978	360-2B	140 (104) at 3350	278 (377) at 2000	8.25:1	4.08 (103.6)	3.44 (87.4)
1978	360-4B			8.25:1	4.08 (103.6)	3.44 (87.4)
1978	401-4B			8.25:1	4.165 (105.8)	3.68 (93.5)
1979	304-2B	125 (93) at 3200	220 (298) at 2400	8.4:1	3.75 (95.3)	3.44 (87.4)
1979	360-2B		8.5:1	4.08 (103.6)		3.44 (87.4)
1979	360-4B			4.08 (103.6)		3.44 (87.4)
1980	304-2B	125 (93) at 3200	220 (298) at 2400	8.4:1	3.75 (95.3)	3.44 (87.4)
1980	360-2B				4.08 (103.6)	3.44 (87.4)
1980	360-4B				4.08 (103.6)	3.44 (87.4)
1981	304-2B	125 (93) at 3200	220 (298) at 2400	8.4:1	3.75 (95.3)	3.44 (87.4)
1981	360-2B				4.08 (103.6)	3.44 (87.4)
1981	360-4B				4.08 (103.6)	3.44 (87.4)
1982	360-2B				4.08 (103.6)	3.44 (87.4)
1982	360-4B				4.08 (103.6)	3.44 (87.4)
1991	360-2B	144 (107) at 3000	280 (380) at 1600		4.08 (103.6)	3.44 (87.4)

== Indy 209 ==
From 1976 until 1979, Jerry Grant "drove the most powerful car ever to appear in Indy car racing" - a turbocharged 209 cu in (3.4 L) two-valve, AMC Gen-2 block V8 engine producing 1,100 hp (820 kW; 1,115 PS) in his Eagle 74 chassis. The car was fast on the straightways, but the engine's weight made corners more difficult to handle. The engine utilized a 3 3/4 in (95.3 mm) bore and a flat plane 2.36 in (59.9 mm) stroke crankshaft.

== See also ==
- AMC straight-4 engine
- AMC straight-6 engine
- AMC and Jeep transmissions
- List of Chrysler engines
- List of AMC Transmission Applications
