= Top Gas =

Former NHRA drag racing professional class

Top Gas (T/G) is a former NHRA drag racing professional class.

Analogous to Top Fuel, Top Gas was a pro class, and allowed dragsters (T/GD) as well as bodied cars.

Several noteworthy cars ran in Top Gas. One of the early streamliners, Scuderia, made her debut at the 1963 NHRA Winternationals at Pomona, California, recording a best pass of 8.83 seconds at 169.17 mph (272.25 km/h). At Arlington later that year, Scuderia set a Top Gas record (average of two passes) of 162.22 mph (261.07 km/h).

Like Top Fuel, Top Gas dragsters experimented with twin engines, including Freight Train and the Motes & Peters digger. It also saw a number of streamliners, including Sidewinder III (in BB/GD) and Scuderia.

Driver Ray Motes and owner R. C. Williams, based in Russell, Kansas, ran "one of the most successful Top Gas dragsters ever". Motes would win the Springnationals and the Top Gas national title in both 1970 and 1971. Williams, then owner of Freight Train (driven by Walt Rhodes), would win the 1971 Gatornationals.

Late model cars were first allowed in the Gas classes in 1967.

Other notable drivers who started or drove in Top Gas include Gordon Collett, Jim Bucher, Eddie Hill, and Jack Moss, while teams like Frakes and Funk, and Schultz and Jones, had many fans.

The last event was the 1971 NHRA Supernationals at Ontario Motor Speedway in California. It was won by Jim Bucher, whose twin-engined dragster redlighted, but was given the win after his opponent, Ken Ellis (in another twin-engined dragster), was disqualified.

Top Gas was eliminated by NHRA in 1972.

== Sources ==
- Taylor, Thom. "Beauty Beyond the Twilight Zone" in Hot Rod, April 2017, pp.30-43.
- Taylor, Thom. "Duel of the Duals" in Hot Rod, April 2017, p.11.
- Taylor, Thom. "Gone Gassers" in Hot Rod, March 2017, p.9.
