= Doug Thorley =

American drag racer (died 2021)

Doug Thorley (died March 10, 2021) was an American Funny Car drag racer, hot rodder and businessman. In 1967, he won the NHRA Nationals' first Funny Car Eliminator title, and was given Car Craft's All-Star Drag Racing Team Funny Car Driver of the Year Award in 1968. Hot Rod magazine describes him as "one of drag racing's most famous early era drivers."

== Racing career ==
Thorley won many drag races at the Santa Ana (California) strip in the 1950s in a 1938 Century coupe. In the 1960s, he was the first in class to break 200 miles per hour at the Bonneville Salt Flats in a C/Modified Sports Corvette. In 1964, Thorley match raced an altered-wheelbase (pre-Funny Car) 396 cu in (6,490 cc) injected big-block 1964 Chevy II he called Chevy Too Much.

Thorley's Doug's Headers Corvair was the first seven-second Funny Car, and it was in this car he won the NHRA supercharged A Funny Car (AA/FC) class at Indianapolis Raceway Park in 1967, defeating Joe Lunati's The Dixie Devil Camaro. It was the first time Funny Car Eliminator was held at Indy. Indy would also prove to be Thorley's only NHRA national event win in Funny Car.

That year 1967, Thorley would also record the first (unofficial) 200 mph (320 km/h) funny car pass in his Corvair, at Lions Drag Strip.

In 1968, Thorley bought a rear-engined AMC 401-powered Javelin TF/FC (one of just a handful of similar funny cars ever built, including Dave Bowman's California Stud) from Woody Gilmore. (The 401 cu in (6,570 cc) would later be replaced by a 392 cu in (6,420 cc) hemi prepared by John Hoven and Glenn Okazaki.) The same year, he was given Car Craft's All-Star Drag Racing Team Funny Car Driver of the Year Award in 1968.

== Doug Thorley Headers ==
Thorley founded his header company in 1958. Among Thorley's better-known customers were Carol Cox (through her husband, who Thorley was friends with). Thorley headers would go on to be a favorite among drag racers.

Thorley Headers is a leading producer of headers and exhaust systems, favored by many rodders and racers.

== Biography ==
Thorley is the subject of the book Doug Thorley: Headers by Doug written by Don Pennington.

Thorley died March 10, 2021, at his home in New Harmony, Utah at age 92.

== Sources ==
- McClurg, Bob. "50 Years of Funny Cars: Part 2" in Drag Racer, November 2016, pp. 35–50.
- McClurg, Bob. The History of AMC Motorsports. Forest Lake, Minnesota: CarTech, Inc, 2016
- Taylor, Thom. "Beauty Beyond the Twilight Zone" in Hot Rod, April 2017, pp. 30–43.
