= Pawn Shop =

A pawn shop is a shop that takes possessions as pledge.

Pawn Shop may also refer to:

== Music ==
- Pawn Shop (album), a 2016 album by Brothers Osborne or the title track
- "Pawn Shop", a song by Sublime from Sublime
- "Pawn Shop", a song by Sonny Terry & Brownie McGhee from Down Home Blues
- "Pawn Shop", the original title of the song "Mammoth" by Interpol
- Pawn Shop, a line of guitars; see List of products manufactured by Fender Musical Instruments Corporation

== Film ==
- Pawn Shop, a 2012 film with Garrett Morris
- The Pawnshop, a 1916 Charlie Chaplin film
- Pawnshop (film), a 2013 film directed by Liubomyr Levytskyi
