= Dragster (car) =

Automobile used in drag racing

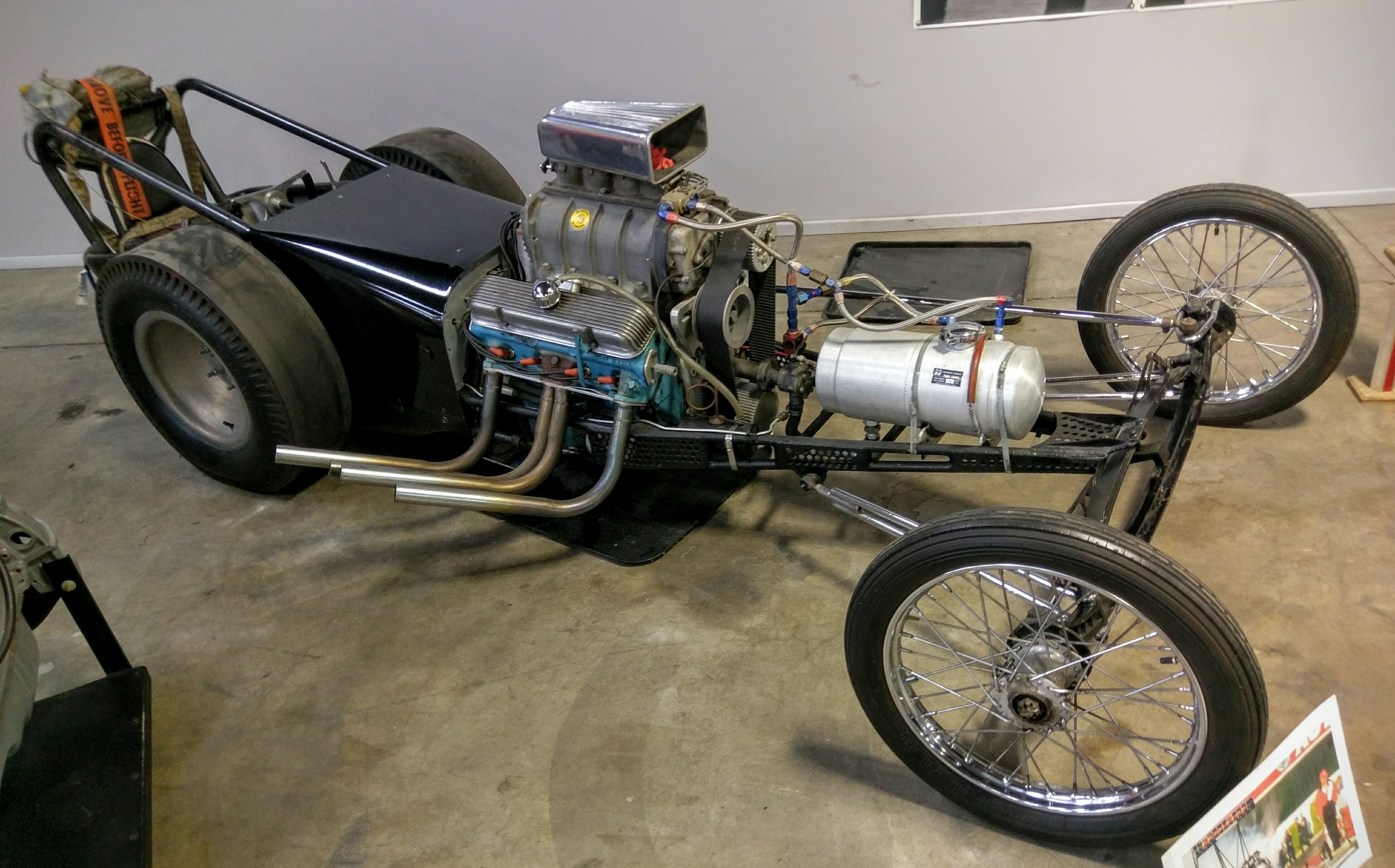
An early example, a 1958 Fuel rail, on display at the California Automobile Museum

A dragster is a specialized competition automobile used in drag racing.

Dragsters, also commonly called "diggers", can be broadly placed in three categories, based on the fuel they use: gasoline, methanol, and nitromethane. They are most commonly single-engined, though twin-engined and quad-engined designs did race in the 1950s and 1960s.

The design of dragsters evolved from the front-engined rail (named for the exposed frame rails) of the earliest days of drag racing, into the "slingshot" (with the driver between or behind the rear tires, or "slicks") of the early to middle 1960s, to the "modern" type common in the 1970s.

Depending on the class they run in, dragsters can be injected or supercharged (or turbocharged), with a variety of possible engines. The engines are most often derived from automobiles'; some early examples used surplus aircraft engines. Today, they may also be electric.

Dragsters are distinct from "bodied" cars such as funny cars and gassers, as well as from Altereds.

== History ==
=== Front engine ===
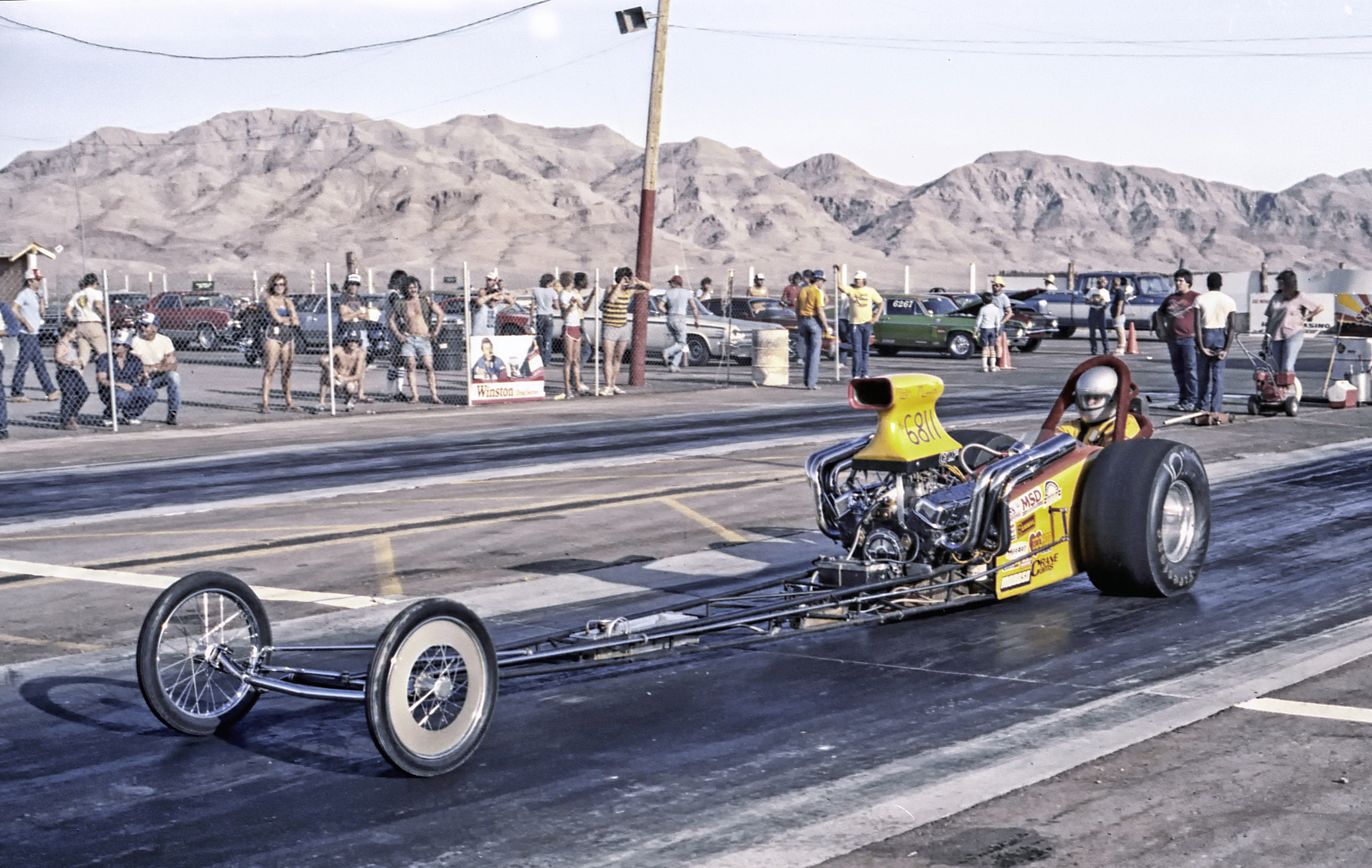
1983 front engine dragster, Las Vegas Speedway

The front engine dragster came about due to engines initially being located in the car's frame in front of the driver. The driver sits angled backward, over the top of the differential in a cockpit situated between the two rear tires, a design originating with Mickey Thompson's Panorama City Special in 1954, as a way of improving traction. This position led to many drivers being maimed when catastrophic clutch failures occurred. Due to limited traction, some dragsters with four rear drive wheels were attempted as well as designs with twin engines.

The final Top Fuel driver to win a National Hot Rod Association national event in a front engine dragster was Art Marshall on August 6, 1972 at the Le Grandnational outside of Montreal, Canada.

=== Rear engine ===
The drawbacks of front-engine designs (including fatalities) led to several attempts at rear-engined cars. Among them were pioneering rear-engined dragsters (and funny cars, including Doug Thorley's and Dave Bowman's) were Steve Swaja's AA/Gas Wedge I from 1963, Roger Lindwall's 1966 Top Fuel Re-Entry and Kent Fuller's fueller Sidewinder III, both in 1969.

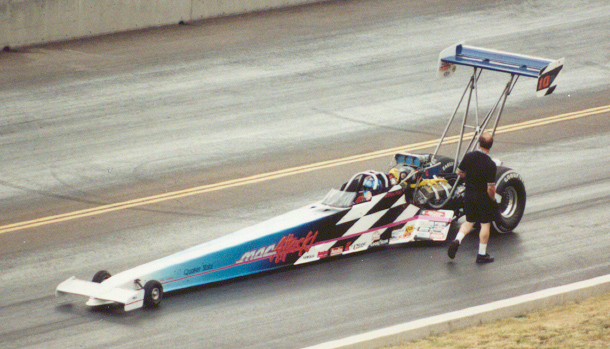
Rear-engined dragster, driven by Cory McClenathan

In mid-1969, Drag Wedge, built by Logghe Brothers for Andy Granatelli, debuted, and later that year, prodded to action by the death of John Mulligan, Woody Gilmore (following the mid-engined Funny Car he built for Doug Thorley) and Pat Foster developed a rear-engined fuel dragster, which was unveiled in December. Driven by Foster, the Gilmore car ran just once, getting up on its single rear wheelie bar and breaking in two at around 220 mph (350 km/h), at Lions Drag Strip. Gilmore and Foster built a similar car, Pawnbroker, for Dwane Ong, incorporating the lessons of the previous car; it debuted in 1970, and proved considerably better. In August, Ong won the 1970 AHRA Nationals in the car. Pawnbroker won the American Hot Rod Association Summernats in Long Island, New York, the first national event win for a rear-engined car, with a pass of 6.83 at 219 mph (352 km/h). "Big Daddy" Don Garlits examined the car and was so impressed with the forward view, he could not understand why everyone did not drive one--and why it did not work. Around the same time, Bernie Schacker's rear-engined car, the first with a rear wing, was the first to run in the sixes, with a 6.98 at 192.70 mph (310.12 km/h), at New York National Speedway's Spring Nationals (an event sanctioned by none of the national bodies).

In April 1970, Mark Williams' car, built for Mike Dollins and Dan Widner (at a cost of only US$2,111.16), first appeared; its 235 in (6,000 mm) wheelbase was significantly longer than the 180 in (4,600 mm) usual for fuellers at the time. The car ran well, but required new driving techniques; Dollins and Widner lacked the money to continue racing it, and it was sold to a Colorado team, which switched to a 354 cu in (5,800 cc) hemi (rather than the usual 392 cu in (6,420 cc).

Others rear-engined cars included ones built by Art Malone (before working with Garlits on his), the National Speed Products Research car built by Frank Huszar (Race Car Specialties) on a stunning 254 in (6,500 mm) wheelbase; driven by Chuck Tanko, it was overweight, at 1,375 lb (624 kg), and could only achieve 7.20s at 210 mph (340 km/h), never running in competition.

On March 8, 1970, at Lions Drag Strip, Garlits was driving Swamp Rat XIII, also called the Wynnscharger, a slingshot rail, when the vehicle suffered a catastrophic failure, and the car broke in half in front of the cockpit.

Garlits returned to Pomona with a brand new mid-engined car, Swamp Rat XIV, in 1971. At first, the rodding magazines considered the disadvantages of the new design "obvious". Swamp Rat XIV turned in a pass of 6.80 right off the trailer, and was so successful during 1971, Garlits won two of his next three Top Fuel Eliminator titles (the Winternats and Bakersfield), and was runner-up at Lions, all in the new car.

Rear engine dragsters have since become the standard dragster design.

== Historic cars ==
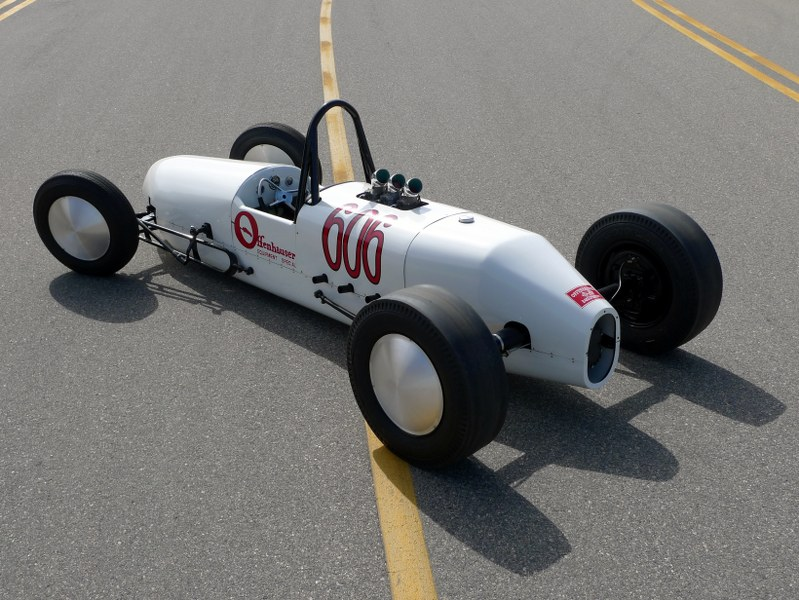
Smokin' White Owl built by George "Ollie" Morris in 1954

- 1954 — first slingshot, built by Mickey Thompson.
- 1954 — Smokin' White Owl, built by George "Ollie" Morris, first purpose-built rear-engined dragster and first car to use a Chevrolet V8 engine.
- 1962 — the Greer-Black–Prudhomme digger, with the best win record in NHRA history.
- 1971 — Swamp Rat XIV (or Swamp Rat 1-R), first successful rear-engined dragster, built by Don Garlits; Ed Donovan introduces the 417 Donovan hemi, an aluminum copy of the Chrysler
