= Gas Ronda =

American drag racer (1926–2017)

- Nationality: American
- Born: Gaspar Ronda; August 25, 1926
- Died: October 25, 2017 (aged 91)
- Retired: 1970

Awards
- International Drag Racing Hall of Fame

Gaspar Ronda (August 25, 1926 – October 25, 2017), better known as Gas Ronda, was an American drag racer. He was also a restaurateur. In 2016, Ronda was inducted into the International Drag Racing Hall of Fame.

== Racing career ==
Always looking for the unusual ride, Ronda started in Stock, driving Hudsons and Buicks, early in the 1950s, in Southern California. He switched to a Corvette, like other racers, but was disappointed by the lack of variety from his competition, which also mainly drove Chevrolets. Instead, he picked a 352 cu in (5,770 cc)/360 hp (270 kW) 1960 Ford Starliner.

Ronda joined forces with engine builder Les Ritchey (owner and operator of Performance Associates in Covina, California).

Ronda moved up to Super Stock, where his 1962 Ford Galaxie, with a tri-power 406 cu in (6,650 cc), was a match for the 409 cu in (6,700 cc) Impalas. At first, he was based at George Newtell's Downtown Ford car dealership in Los Angeles, where Ronda was a salesman.

Ronda changed over to a 427 cu in (7,000 cc) Galaxie in 1963, but, though it was "one of the quickest and fastest" in the U.S., it was overweight compared to its competition.

To be able to more easily collaborate with Ritchey, Ronda moved to Covina midway through 1964, taking a job with Russ Davis Ford.

Because Ford had sold more than the fifty required to homolgate the 427 Fairlanes, they were eligible for Super Stock, rather than F/X (Factory Experimental). Ronda got one, which he had repainted "bright poppy red", like the (then-new) Mustang. Ronda faced Butch Leal's Thunderbolt in the final of the 1964 Winternationals, and won, recording a pass of 11.78 seconds at 123.40 mph (198.59 km/h). He also took NHRA's national Top Stock crown that year, at the wheel of a 427 Fairlane.

It was in the Thunderbolt, as part of the Bill Waters Ford Racing Team in 1964, that Ronda won Super Stock at the first Hot Rod Magazine Championship Drag Races, in Riverside, California. He was also a member of the Ford factory drag racing team, running one of their 427-powered Fairlane Thunderbolts.

Ronda was one of the top drivers of Fords in Super Stock, and in the early days of Funny Car.

For the 1965 season, Ronda got a 427 SOHC ("Cammer") A/FX Mustang (with a four-speed manual transmission), which was capable of ten-second e.t.s. At the time, however, the Ramchargers, led by Jimmy Nix, were match racing injected nitro-burning altered-wheelbase Dodges, banned in A/FX, capable of eights, and they eclipsed the legal A/FX cars. That year, Ronda went to the Mr. Stock final at the 1965 AHRA World Championship at Lions Drag Strip in Wilmington, California, where he lost to fellow Ford Drag Racing Team member Dick Brannan; this earned Ronda US$700. Ronda said, “Of all the cars I raced, the 1965 Mustang was the most fun to drive.”

Ronda's new longer-wheelbase 1966 Mustang proved extremely quick, clocking E.T.'s into the mid-eights. Then Ritchey, who played a significant part in Ronda's success, was killed in a racing accident at Fontana, California; Ronda pulled back on the car's setup and only ran nines for months afterward.

After winning AHRA's Top Fuel Stock event at Lions (beating Hayden Proffitt and winning $1500), Ronda graduated to A/FX (which morphed into Funny Car full-time later in 1966.), driving a Russ Davis Ford-sponsored C/FD Ford Mustang. This car turned "record-breaking" E.T.'s in the eights, on the way to Ronda's win at the 1967 March Meet in Bakersfield, California, that year.

Ronda made a brief return to Super Stock in 1968, when Ford introduced the 428 Cobra Jet Mustang, at the Winternats.

In 1967, Ronda got a new tube-frame Mustang, again owned by Davis, prepared by Holman Moody; Ronda painted it "poppy red", also. With a stock body, tilt front end, and working doors, it ran a best of 7.90 seconds at 184.04 mph (296.18 km/h), after Ronda added a supercharger toward year's end.

This was replaced by Ronda's last, and quickest, car, a Logghe Bros.-chassised Mustang Mach 1, in 1969. The Mach I gave him a win at OCIR's Manufacturers Championships that year, defeating the Chi-Town Hustler (owned by Pat Minick, tuned by Austin Coil, and driven by John Farkonas) in the final round. Ronda won the same event several more times.

It was in this car Ronda suffered a career-ending fire, when his engine exploded at the AHRA Winter Nationals at Beeline Dragway in Mesa, Arizona, on 25 January 1970. Transmission fluid burned through the car's firewall, severely burning his lower body.

It was as a direct result of that accident that onboard fire extinguisher systems were made mandatory for all Funny Cars.

It took Ronda close to a year to recover, and he had undergo a number of plastic surgeries to reconstruct damaged areas. The injury provoked him to promise his father, who had never approved of him racing, he would quit.

Ronda had a reputation for "being a tough racer but also a true gentleman racer".

== After retirement ==
Ronda took a radically different tack after retiring from drag racing. Four years later, he opened the Funny Car Tavern, located in Azusa, California. In time, he moved to West Covina, establishing a nightclub called Ronda's Gas House, with three bars and two dance floors, right on Interstate 10 east of Azusa Ave. Over the following eighteen years, it kept Ronda so busy, he could not even attend races.

Only in the 1990s did Ronda have time to begin becoming involved again, at events like the NHRA Motorsports Museum Hot Rod Reunions, or the 2016 Winternats, where one of his early Funny Cars was on display by NHRA, celebrating 50 years of the class.

== Off track ==
Ronda became a favorite among Funny Car drivers on the U.S. West Coast.

When he started racing, Ronda's day job was as a dance instructor.

Ronda made it a point to be well-dressed, even in the pits, which made him stand out.

In 2014, Ronda suffered a stroke.

In 2016, Ronda was made a member of the International Drag Racing Hall of Fame.

Ronda died of cancer on 25 October 2017. He was 91.

Ronda was married to his wife Nina, and had two sons, Gaspar "Gas", Jr., and John, and a daughter, Tyline.
