= 1967 NHRA Winternationals =

National Hot Rod Association
- Venue: Auto Club Raceway
- Location: Pomona, California

The 1967 NHRA Winternationals (commonly known as the Winternats) were a National Hot Rod Association (NHRA) drag racing event, held at Auto Club Raceway, Pomona, California on 5 February.

== Events ==
More Aggravation III took home both the AA/CD (supercharged A Competition Dragster) trophy and "Best Appearing Car" award.

== Results ==
=== Top Fuel ===
Top Fuel hosted a field of eight.

==== Round One ====
In round one, Jim Bollinger lost do Danny Ongais. Dave Beebe was defeated by Gene Goleman. Conrad "Connie" Kalitta eliminated Mike Snively. Jerry Ruth fell to "Sneaky Pete" Robinson.

==== Round Two ====
In the semi-final, Ongais lost to Goleman and Robinson was eliminated by Kalitta.

==== Final round ====
Kalitta defeated Goleman, winning US$7,500.

=== Altered ===
The Altered class win went to William “Wild Willie” Borsch, at the wheel of the AA/FA Winged Express.

=== Top Gas ===
In the Top Gas final, Kelly Brown lost to Gordon Collett, who claimed a US$3000 prize.

=== Competition Eliminator ===
More Aggravation III took home the AA/CD trophy, with a best effort of 7.80 seconds at 190 mph (310 km/h), on gasoline.

=== Super Stock ===
Eddie Vasquez Jr. and his 1966 Chevy II won Super Stock Eliminator, defeating the 1965 A990 Plymouth of Ed Miller.

=== Stock ===
Graham Douglas and Ed Forys won the 1967 Jr. Stock Eliminator, 14.42 seconds at 95.94 MPH. Defeated 1952 Oldsmobile of Keith Berg. Source: Junior Stock by Doug Boyce ISBN 978-1-934709-91-7
