= 1991 in motorsport =

The following is an overview of the events of 1991 in motorsport including the major racing events, motorsport venues that were opened and closed during a year, championships and non-championship events that were established and disestablished in a year, and births and deaths of racing drivers and other motorsport people.

== Annual events ==
The calendar includes only annual major non-championship events or annual events that had significance separate from the championship. For the dates of the championship events see related season articles.

| Date | Event | Ref |
|---|---|---|
| 29 December-17 January | 13th Dakar Rally | |
| 2–3 February | 29th 24 Hours of Daytona | |
| 17 February | 33rd Daytona 500 | |
| 12 May | 49th Monaco Grand Prix | |
| 26 May | 75th Indianapolis 500 | |
| 27 May-7 June | 74th Isle of Man TT | |
| 15–16 June | 19th 24 Hours of Nurburgring | |
| 22–23 June | 59th 24 Hours of Le Mans | |
| 28 July | 14th Suzuka 8 Hours | |
| 3–4 August | 43rd 24 Hours of Spa | |
| 18 August | 1st Masters of Formula 3 | |
| 6 October | 32nd Tooheys 1000 | |
| 24 November | 38th Macau Grand Prix | |
| 7–8 December | 4th Race of Champions | |

== Births ==
| Date | Month | Name | Nationality | Occupation | Note | Ref |
|---|---|---|---|---|---|---|
| 17 | January | Esapekka Lappi | Finnish | Rally driver | 2017 Rally Finland winner. | |
| 25 | September | Alexander Rossi | American | Racing driver | Indianapolis 500 winner (2016). | |

== Deaths ==
| Date | Month | Name | Age | Nationality | Occupation | Note | Ref |
|---|---|---|---|---|---|---|---|
| 15 | May | Fritz Riess | 68 | German | Racing driver | 24 Hours of Le Mans winner (1952). | |
| 1 | October | "Wild Willie" Borsch | 60 | American | Drag racer | Driver of the Winged Experess AA/FA | |

== See also ==
- List of 1991 motorsport champions
