= Dale Emery =

American drag racer (died 2018)

- Born: Derrill Dale Emery; March 4, 1939; Stillwater, Oklahoma, U.S.
- Died: March 16, 2018 (aged 79); U.S.
- Citizenship: USA

Derrill Dale Emery (March 4, 1939 – March 16, 2018), nicknamed "The Snail" (sometimes "Schnoz"), was an American drag racer. Emery raced Fuel Altereds and Funny Cars, and briefly in wheelstanders, as well as serving as crew chief for several top teams.

== Personal life ==
A native of Stillwater, Oklahoma, raised in Northern California, Emery was friendly with Willie Borsch, Dale Funk, Rich Guasco, and John "Tarzan" Austin, and long-time friends with Pat Galvin.

From 1958 until their 1970 divorce, Emery was married to fellow San Pablo School alumnus Carla Marie Greeson, with whom he had at least one child, a son. Emery was married to Brenda, and lived near Dallas, Texas.

Emery died after a prolonged illness.

== Career ==
In 1955, he began racing, starting with a C/G ‘41 Chevrolet coupé gassers. He moved up to fuel cars in 1959, running a rear-engined coupé. He returned to the gas classes in 1960, at the wheel of a dragster, before taking the wheel of car owner Woody Parker's Top Fuel dragster (TF/D) in 1962. That car was built by Pete Ogden, who also built the Pure Hell Fuel Altered (AA/FA) for Rich Guasco.

When Don Petrich quit the Pure Hell team in 1965, Emery replaced him, and stayed five seasons; he frequently match raced his friend "Wild Willie" Borsch. It was while driving Pure Hell he met D. Gannt, who was a crewman for Borsch, during that time.

Pure Hell was entered in a 1968 showdown event between Funny Cars and Altereds at OCIR; Emery won the event. A week later, he recorded a 207.36 mph (333.71 km/h) pass, on his way to winning the Hot Rod Magazine Championships at Riverside Raceway (and bettering Borsch's 200.44 mph (322.58 km/h) pass of the year before), a speed no Altered would surpass that season.

After Pure Hell was wrecked, Guasco fielded a Pure Hell Funny Car; Emery denies ever driving the car, though some sources say he did.

Of his time with Guasco's team, Emery said, “Driving the Pure Hell was the most fun of anything I ever did. There was no money to be made doing it, but we did it because we liked racing.”

From Guasco's AA/FA team, Emery went to the fuel slingshot of the Rousin-O’Hare team in 1970, where he spent six months and won TF/D at Dallas International Motor Speedway.

Emery's next ride was in partnership with Gary Watson on the Flying Red Baron wheelstander Mustang, which he helped build—and crashed. After the rollover, Emery refused to drive it again, believing "it was too much of a clown deal"

Emery first encountered "Waterbed Fred" Miller, with whom he would continue to associate for more than fifty years, when Emery and Gannt came into Bob Riggle's Mansfield, Ohio, shop with Flying Red Baron. Delivering Don and Roy Gay's Infinity to Riggle, who had just purchased the funny car, led to Emery driving for the new owner.

Riggle owned the famous Hemi Under Glass wheelstander, and gave Emery his first Funny Car ride. Emery later worked for Sam Harris at Chaparral trailers.

Starting a Funny Car team in 1973, Jeg Coughlin, Sr. hired Emery to drive for him; he was joined by Gantt (then on Willie Borsch's crew) and Miller. Coughlin's Chevrolet Camaro won the IHRA national event at Bristol that year, taking a win over Pat Foster in Barry Setzer's Vega.

Emery won Funny Car at Le Grandnational at Sanair in 1973, defeating Frank Mancuso in the final. At the U.S. Nationals, Emery qualified #10, and was eliminated in round one by #2 qualifier "Jungle Jim" Liberman. The same month, he won the IHRA All American Nationals at Bristol Motor Speedway, defeating top qualifier Raymond Beadle in the final, and lost to Foster at the IHRA U.S. Open at North Carolina Motor Speedway in Rockingham, North Carolina. He also reached the final round in the Supernationals at Ontario, being eliminated by Tom "Mongoose" McEwen.

Emery finished the 1973 season in spectacular fashion. "Mongoose" McEwen, though successful as a match racer, had yet to win his first NHRA national event; his 1973 Duster qualified #17 and only made the field at all after Bobby Rowe could not race. Emery reached the semifinal (having recorded a best pass of 6.28), where he faced Don "The Snake" Prudhomme, who was eager to face teammate McEwen. Going to the staging lights, Emery had a fuel line fitting leaking at one injector, but hoped it would survive the pass. Instead, the supercharger exploded and the body blew off the chassis, flipping the car over and slamming into the hay bales at the end of the strip.

Replacing the destroyed one with a new, lighter body (Emery always passionate about weight reduction), qualifying #6, the team defeated "Snake" Prudhomme and Dale Pulde, to meet the 1973 Vega of Frank Hall in the final, and win Funny Car, at the Winternationals in 1974, taking home a purse of US$13,800.

When Coughlin stopped touring with his team, the Emery and Gannt combination provided two wins at NHRA national events that year before Coughlin decided to quit racing to focus on his mail order business. Emery quit in a disagreement over pay, and went back to Chaparral.

Emery briefly drove the Vega, owned by Fuel Altered racers Leroy Chadderton and Glen Okazaki (the car later raced in Britain as [Gladiator), turning in one pass at 6.99 with the car on fire, after a valve lifter failure.

At the 1975 IHRA World Nationals, Emery qualified Gene "Snowman" Snow's Vega #5, only to be eliminated in the first round by #1 qualifier (and eventual event winner) Dale Pulde.

In 1976 and 1977, Emery and “Big Mike” Burkhart worked together, making the final at the first ever NHRA Cajun Nationals, where Emery lost to Beadle. The duo also had peculiarly bad luck against McEwen.

Emery wrecked Burkhart's silver Camaro fuel funny car at the 1977 U.S. Nationals. Though track marshals had to cut him from the car, Emery suffered only a broken bone in his left arm, which was pierced by the lever of the fuel shut-off valve. It proved to be his last race.

The day after his 1977 wreck, Emery returned to the track with his arm in a cast, and was offered the chance to tune the Blue Max, which had been in the left lane the day before, by Beadle; Emery hesitated to accept, having only ever tuned his own cars before that. When Beadle also offered to let Emery work as a substitute driver, he accepted. He eventually joined the team and, working with Miller and Gannt, Emery drove Blue Max, hired by Beadle (on behalf of car owner and team tuner Harry Schmidt). Emery transformed the troubled team into one "that dominated Funny Car in the late 1970s and 1980s".

1978 was a difficult year for Emery. The Blue Max had been a top ten car three years running before that, but suffered persistent fuel system difficulties, keeping the car from even doing successful burnouts, for most of a year. When that was cured, Blue Max promptly won at Seattle, Boise, and Kansas City. Qualifying for the U.S. Nationals, the team recorded their first five-second pass, a 5.98, making Beadle just the second driver in the fives. They closed 1978 by defeating Tom "Mongoo$e" McEwen at the World Finals.

This was precursor to winning NHRA's Funny Car championship the next three seasons in a row.

In 1979, Emery tuned Blue Max to final round finishes at the Winternationals, Springnationals, and Mile-High Nationals, and wins at the Summernationals and Fallnationals, just edging out Don Prudhomme.

Blue Max took three event wins and two final-round finishes in 1980, easily beating Billy Meyer, and capped a victorious 1981 season with a win at NHRA's most prestigious event, the U.S. Nats.

Beadle's increasing attention on NASCAR left the Blue Max suffering, though Emery tuned the car, driven by "Lil' John" Lombardo, to a win at Indy in 1985; it was eventually sold in 1990.

Following the sale of Blue Max, Emery opened Dale Emery Fuel Systems, to provide Fuel Pumps and Fuel injectors for Nostalgia drag racing teams, as well a small number of existing teams. By 2012, he was supplying a Blue Max nostalgia funny car team.

== Incidents ==
Emery survived a couple of frightening incidents. While driving Pure Hell at Fremont Dragstrip, an improperly fastened steering wheel came off the steering column, and the car ended up in a flooded ditch, upside down, forcing him to hold his breath until the car could be righted.

While racing at the 1977 U.S. Nationals, Burkhart's silver Camaro fuel funny car got out of shape, veering toward the centerline (reminiscent of an Altered), then swerved toward the guardrail and abruptly stood on its nose, something never seen before or since (through 2012), rotating along the rail two or three times before coming to rest. Though track marshals had to cut him from the car, Emery suffered only a broken bone in his left arm, which was pierced by the lever of the fuel shut-off valve. It proved to be his last race.

=== Talent ===
Besides being a driver, Emery was an engineer who was able to conceive and build parts when needed, including the team's first sixteen-plug heads, as well as a revival of an old idea, dual magnetos. His ability to innovate and build from scratch has been compared to Dick LaHaie, Alan Johnson, Tim Richards, Austin Coil, and Don Garlits.
