= Carol Cox =

American drag racer

- Nationality: American

Super Stock

Carol Cox was a pioneering American woman drag racer. She was the first woman to win at a National Hot Rod Association (NHRA) national event.

== History ==
Cox was based in Whittier, California. "Women had been competing at local tracks for years -– often in a “Powder Puff" class", but never in a national event. At the time, of course, single women were denied credit cards, and all women were banned from jury duty. Cox followed her husband, Lloyd, an engineer who also raced Oldsmobile stockers (and got sponsorship from a car dealership in Whitier), into racing, encouraged by racer Peggy Hart after they met at the Santa Ana Drags.

After switching to Pontiac in 1958, Lloyd had so many problems with the factory Hydramatic automatic transmission, he had to take night classes. In time, his skill at tuning them reached the point he opened his own shop, which helped finance Carol's racing. Her racing at Lions Dragstrip, which Mickey Thompson ran at the time, earned Lloyd a job working for him. Early in 1961, Lloyd bought a Ventura for the new season. The car was powered by a 389 cu in (6,370 cc) 348-horsepower Pontiac V-8 engine with Tri-Power, outfitted with headers from Lloyd's friend, Doug Thorley (later famous for building headers), and mounted Lakewood prototype shock absorbers in front. They spend months tuning the handling of the car before driving to Indianapolis to enter the U.S. Nationals. At the time, NHRA banned women from national events. Cox disagreed, as did a number of other women racers, notably Shirley Shahan, Roberta Leighton, Barbara Hamilton, and Paula Murphy (driver of the Miss STP Mustang FC.). Lloyd drove the Ventura, instead.

Cox responded by contacting the Los Angeles Herald Examiner (where her mother and father had once worked) and the Los Angeles Times, and her congressman. In 1962, under additional pressure from Peggy Hart (wife of track owner "Pappy" Hart) and Thompson, as well as fellow racers Shahan and Leighton, Cox was the first woman allowed to race at an NHRA national event. Cox drove the 1961 Ventura (which was not trailered) to Pomona for the Winternats. Cox won the title in S/SA (Super Stock, automatic transmission), making her the first woman ever to take a win at an NHRA national event; the 9 March 1962 issue of National Dragster recorded her as a "crowd favorite", with a winning pass of 13.06 seconds at 107.65 mph (173.25 km/h), but says nothing about it being a first for a woman, dismissively calling her a "'powder puff' handler". Some racers believe a class win is more difficult to achieve than a handicap (eliminator) win.

The win attracted a lot of local media attention. Several months later, the family loaded the Ventura, and a Hayden Proffitt-built A/FX Pontiac Tempest (owned by Thompson), on their hauler and drove again to Indianapolis. Cox won S/SA again, at the Nationals, NHRA's most prestigious event. Lloyd also won, in A/FX. In subsequent competition, Cox was frequently accused of cheating.

== Personal life ==
Cox was married to Lloyd, and has a daughter, Karen, who did race for a while, a son, Steve, who has also been a successful racer, driving a '68 Camaro bracket racer capable of 10-second passes. Her granddaughter, Crista, also once raced in Jr. Dragster. In 2018, at age 90, Cox was suffering dementia. In August, 2022, at age 95, Carol Cox passed in Minnesota
