= Roberta Leighton =

American drag racer (1932-2002)

- Born: April 27, 1932 Los Angeles, California, U.S.
- Died: November 15, 2002 (aged 70) Ridgecrest, California, U.S.

Gas

Roberta Maxine Leighton (née Haslam; April 27, 1932 – November 15, 2002) was an American drag racer. She was the first woman licensed by the National Hot Rod Association (NHRA) to race competitively. She was also the first woman to win a national title, in the 1962 U.S. Nationals at Indianapolis, in the J/S class. In 2002, shortly before her death, she received a lifetime achievement award at the World Finals at Pomona.

== Racing career ==
Leighton started drag racing in 1952. Along with other family members, she was a member of the Dust Devils Car Club, which ran Inyokern Dragstrip in the high desert of Southern California. Leighton became interested in cars at the age of ten around her father who was a mechanic.

Leighton, like fellow racers Carol Cox and Shirley Shahan, campaigned to allow women to compete equally with men. Leighton, in 1963, was the first woman licensed to compete in NHRA's Gas class. She was good friends with fellow racer Shahan, and shared a sense of camaraderie with the other women racers, including Cox, Shirley Muldowney, Barbara Hamilton, and Paula Murphy.

Leighton's husband, Robert (commonly called Gus) served with a number of sanctioning bodies, including the Southern California Timing Association(SCTA). Her sister, Phillys ("P.J."), married well-known racer Bernie Partridge, a friend of NHRA founder Wally Parks and himself a later NHRA Vice President. Leighton was uniquely well placed to get changes made.

My mom started racing in 1952, and she and dad were always talking to [NHRA competition director] Jack Hart and having him come out to watch her race... It seems like every step the women took they had to get approved to do it. Dad could have jumped into the car and driven it all day long, but a woman pretty much had to be blessed with Holy Water to do it. — David Leighton

In 1962, Leighton won her class (J/Stock) at the U.S. Nationals at Indianapolis, in a 1960 Chevrolet El Camino. She later turned the Camino into an injected alky-burner. Her son, David, still owns the 1960 J/S-winning Camino, which he hopes to put back on the strip some day.

Leighton suffered third-degree burns in a 1963 house fire, keeping her out of racing until 1965. Pioneering skin grafts by doctors at the NAWS China Lake hospital helped save her ankles and her racing career. She came back to sportsman class racing in 1965, and kept racing in competition classes until 1978, when she switched to bracket racing for twelve years.

== Later life and death ==
In later years, Leighton served as a track official, working at national, division and local races. She also helped run Inyokern Dragstrip.

Leighton died of cancer on November 15, 2002.
