= Pure Hell (Altered) =

American drag racing car

Pure Hell was an American Fuel Altered (AA/FA) drag racing car.

With an 89 in (2,300 mm) wheelbase, Pure Hell was initially powered by a Chevrolet small-block engine V8, mounted high in the chassis, at a steep angle, to improve traction.

Driver Don Petrich was replaced in 1965 by Dale Emery.

The car was popular for match racing and became notorious for refusing to run in a straight line (thanks in part to its short wheelbase), wheelstanding, and running off the strip entirely. In a 1994 interview, Emery remarked, “When it locked up at half-track, it was anybody’s guess which way it would go.” On one occasion, at Fremont Raceway, the car landed upside-down in a flooded ditch after an improperly fastened steering wheel came off the steering column.

After Pure Hell was outfitted with a 392 cu in (6,420 cc) hemi and better clutch in 1968, the car was entered in a showdown event between Funny Cars and Altereds at OCIR; Emery won the event. A week later, he recorded a 207.36 mph (333.71 km/h) pass, on his way to winning the Hot Rod Magazine Championship Drag Races at Riverside (and bettering Borsch's 200.44 mph (322.58 km/h) pass of the year before), a speed no Altered would surpass that season.

Pure Hell was wrecked in a highway accident when the transporter crashed near Deming, New Mexico, in 1970.
