= Ed Pink =

American drag racing engine builder (1931–2025)

- Born: February 10, 1931; Los Angeles, California, U.S.
- Died: April 27, 2025 (aged 94)
- Occupation: Engine builder

Ed Pink (February 10, 1931 – April 27, 2025), nicknamed The Old Master, was an American drag racing engine builder.

Pink was born in Los Angeles on February 10, 1931. (Note: Both the Engine Builder Hall of Fame and the Motorsports Hall of Fame of America give a birth date of May 11, 1928.) His company, Ed Pink Racing Engines, supplied top racers, including Shirley Muldowney, Don Prudhomme, Gas Ronda, Dale Emery, Guy Tipton, Mike Burkhart, and Richard Tharp.

Pink was inducted into the Motorsports Hall of Fame of America in 2012. He died on April 27, 2025, at the age of 94.
