= Shelby, Nebraska =

Village in Polk County, Nebraska, United States

- Village
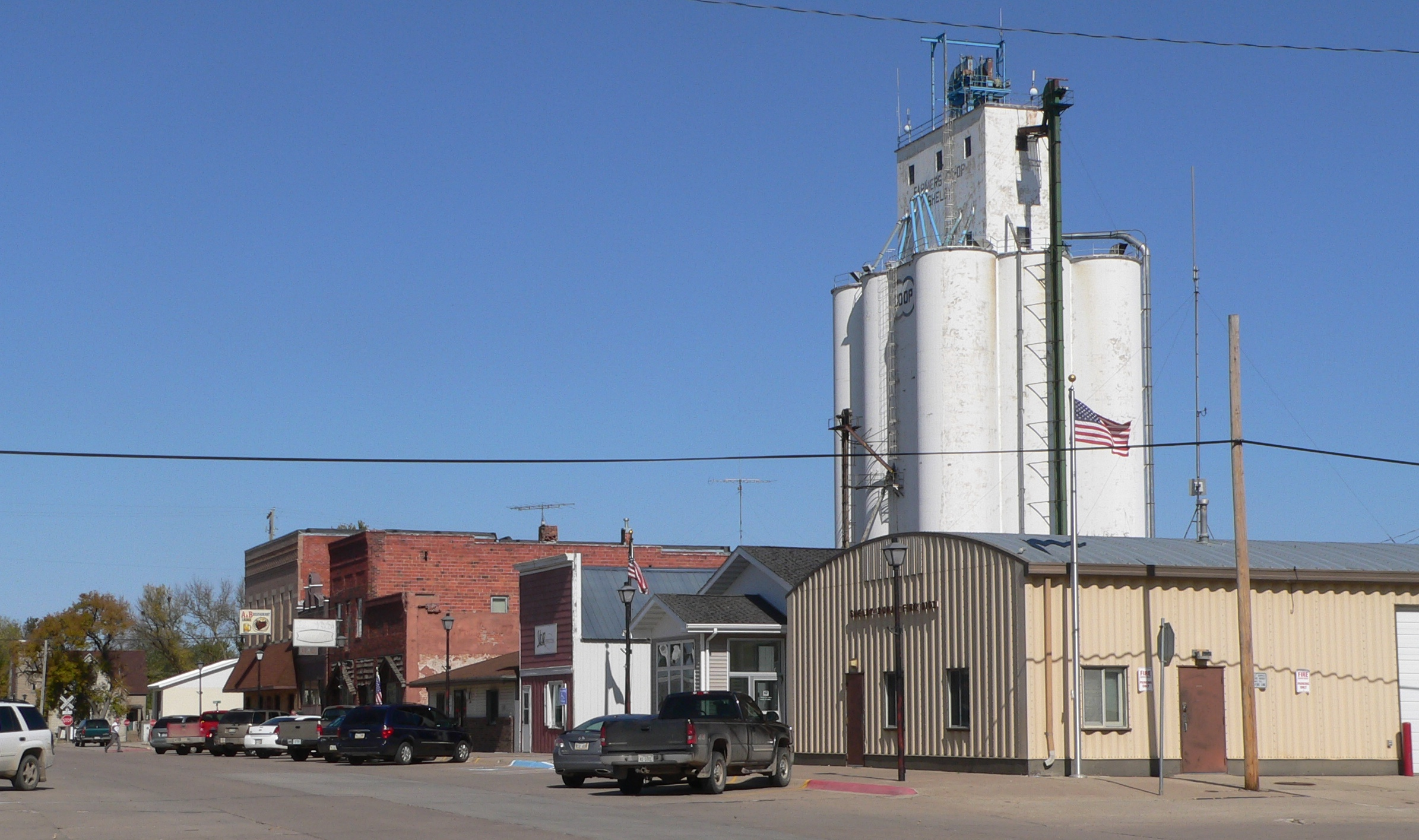
- Downtown Shelby, October 2011

- Location of Shelby, Nebraska
- Coordinates: 41°11′38″N 97°25′34″W
- Country: United States
- State: Nebraska
- County: Polk

Area
  - Total: 0.56 sq mi (1.46 km^{2})
  - Land: 0.56 sq mi (1.46 km^{2})
  - Water: 0 sq mi (0.00 km^{2})
- Elevation: 1,647 ft (502 m)

Population (2020)
  - Total: 710
  - Density: 1,262.7/sq mi (487.54/km^{2})
- Time zone: UTC-6 (Central (CST))
  - Summer (DST): UTC-5 (CDT)
- ZIP code: 68662
- Area code: 402
- FIPS code: 31-44595
- GNIS feature ID: 2399796

Shelby is a village in Polk County, Nebraska, United States. As of the 2020 census, Shelby had a population of 710. Shelby lies along the north side of U.S. Highway 81 near the eastern edge of Polk County. It is 6 miles (9.7 km) east of Osceola, and just 17 miles (27 km) south and 3 miles (4.8 km) west of Columbus. Nebraska's center of population is near Shelby.

== History ==
In 1873, Civil War veteran Horace A. Cowles set up the Cyclone post office in his home one mile east and one mile south of present-day Shelby. In 1879, with the coming of the railroad, a second post office named Arcade was established one mile east of the present site of Shelby. In the winter of 1880, the post office was moved again a mile west to where Shelby is today. Postal authorities objected to the name "Arcade" due to confusion with the town of Arcadia in Valley County. In search of a new name for the settlement, the people chose "Shelby", after the name of an official with the Omaha and Republican Valley Railway (a branch of the Union Pacific). The land which Arcade was established on was owned by Gilbert Van Vorce and Peter Matter. Seeing a need for a trade center in the area, these men gave the railroad company half interest in their property and the town was established. After the railroad retained its 200 feet (61 m) on each side and closest to the tracks, eight blocks were located on each side parallel to the tracks. The original streets are still present and retain the names of Walnut, Elm, Chestnut, Pine, Cherry, and Oak.

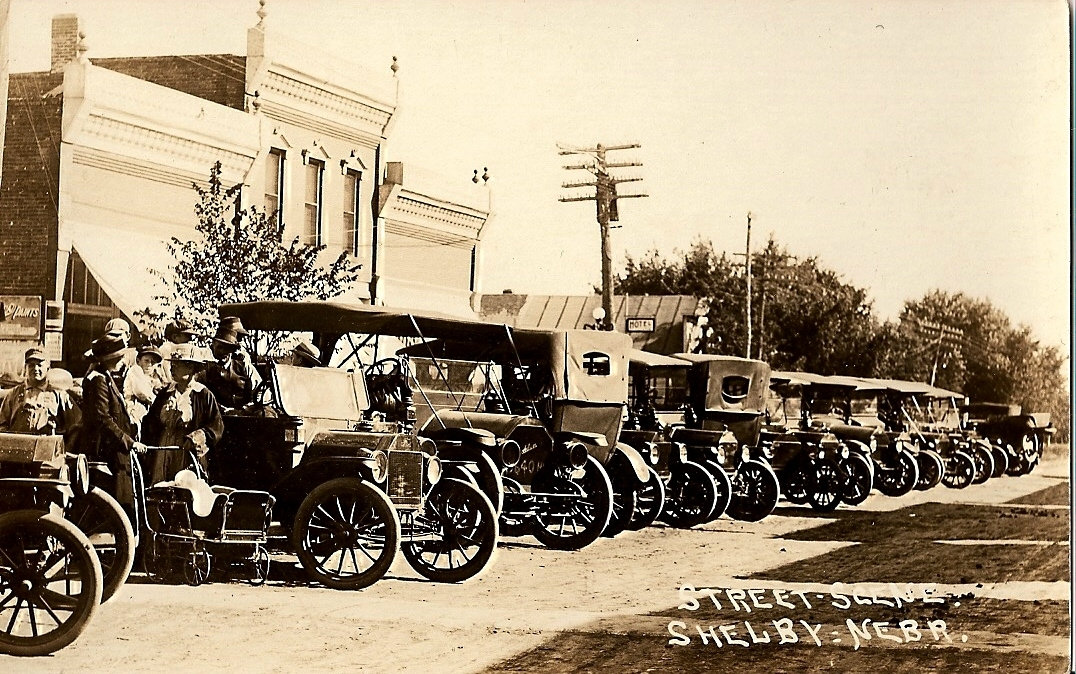
Shelby, Nebraska circa 1920

In 1880 the town of Shelby boasted a population of 93 with businesses which included a drug store, hardware store, hotel, boot and shoe shop, livery stable, and physician. J.T. Dunning built the first elevator, located on the south side of the tracks along with the railway depot. The first store, owned by H.C. and Frank Dunning, sold general merchandise. Conrad Thelen and Charles Krumbach opened the first hardware store, which would run for 40 years.

Today Shelby has 690 residents, businesses, programs, community organizations, and a new housing development subdivision. Shelby celebrated its centennial in 1979 and its quasquicentennial in 2004.

== Geography ==
According to the United States Census Bureau, the village has a total area of 0.56 square miles (1.45 km^{2}), all land.

== Demographics ==
Historical population
Census	Pop.	Note	%±
1890	333		—
1900	425		27.6%
1910	503		18.4%
1920	559		11.1%
1930	630		12.7%
1940	627		−0.5%
1950	624		−0.5%
1960	613		−1.8%
1970	647		5.5%
1980	724		11.9%
1990	690		−4.7%
2000	690		0.0%
2010	714		3.5%
2020	710		−0.6%
U.S. Decennial Census

=== 2010 census ===
As of the census of 2010, there were 714 people, 290 households, and 193 families residing in the village. The population density was 1,275.0 inhabitants per square mile (492.3/km^{2}). There were 322 housing units at an average density of 575.0 per square mile (222.0/km^{2}). The racial makeup of the village was 95.9% White, 0.1% African American, 0.3% Native American, 0.1% Asian, 2.0% from other races, and 1.5% from two or more races. Hispanic or Latino people of any race were 12.2% of the population.

There were 290 households, of which 31.4% had children under the age of 18 living with them, 55.9% were married couples living together, 7.9% had a female householder with no husband present, 2.8% had a male householder with no wife present, and 33.4% were non-families. 28.3% of all households were made up of individuals, and 15.8% had someone living alone who was 65 years of age or older. The average household size was 2.46 and the average family size was 3.06.

The median age in the village was 40 years. 27.6% of residents were under the age of 18; 6.3% were between the ages of 18 and 24; 23.7% were from 25 to 44; 24.4% were from 45 to 64; and 17.9% were 65 years of age or older. The gender makeup of the village was 47.5% male and 52.5% female.

=== 2000 census ===
As of the census of 2000, there were 690 people, 299 households, and 199 families residing in the village. The population density was 1,268.4 inhabitants per square mile (489.7/km^{2}). There were 323 housing units at an average density of 593.8 per square mile (229.3/km^{2}). The racial makeup of the village was 98.55% White, 0.14% African American, 0.29% Asian, 0.29% from other races, and 0.72% from two or more races. Hispanic or Latino people of any race were 1.59% of the population.

There were 299 households, out of which 29.4% had children under the age of 18 living with them, 60.5% were married couples living together, 4.3% had a female householder with no husband present, and 33.4% were non-families. 29.8% of all households were made up of individuals, and 19.4% had someone living alone who was 65 years of age or older. The average household size was 2.31 and the average family size was 2.88.

In the village, the population was spread out, with 25.2% under the age of 18, 8.1% from 18 to 24, 24.3% from 25 to 44, 21.6% from 45 to 64, and 20.7% who were 65 years of age or older. The median age was 39 years. For every 100 females, there were 90.6 males. For every 100 females age 18 and over, there were 93.3 males.

As of 2000 the median income for a household in the village was $36,071, and the median income for a family was $42,434. Males had a median income of $30,625 versus $21,979 for females. The per capita income for the village was $15,900. About 2.5% of families and 4.8% of the population were below the poverty line, including 5.9% of those under age 18 and 2.9% of those age 65 or over.

== Local government ==
The Village of Shelby is governed by a board of trustees. Municipal officials include a board chairperson and four board members who are elected for a term of four years. Polk County has 14 townships, and is governed by three county commissioners elected by popular vote for four-year terms.

Shelby is a member of the Mid-State Interlocal Communities, together with Stromsburg, Gresham, Benedict, Hampton, Bradshaw, and Polk. Representatives of the member communities meet on a quarterly basis to manage sharing of resources.

== Community organizations ==
Shelby has a Chamber of Commerce.

The Shelby Betterment Corporation, a non-profit organization, was organized in 1987 with 20 stockholders. The corporation has helped finance new business ventures in the community and attract new businesses to it.

== Economy ==
The basic economic activities of Shelby include farming, cattle feeding, hog production and retailing.

== Education ==
=== Shelby-Rising City Public School District ===
Shelby-Rising City Public School District was consolidated in 2011. The K-12 building is located in Shelby. The school site includes a new elementary and activity facilities constructed in 2017 and the original building was renovated in 2016. It is served by Educational Service Unit #7, which is headquartered in Columbus and serves seven counties.

== Religion ==
The Methodist Church was the first to be built, ringing its bell to call worshipers in 1883. In 1898 the Catholics completed their first church; the current Catholic church was built in 1930. A new Methodist Church was built in 1951.

== Recreation ==
Shelby has one park approximately five acres in size. Facilities in the park include two ball fields, a roofed shelter for grilling out, a swimming pool, courts for sand volleyball and for tennis/basketball, a playground, and a recreational bike/hike trail.

== Annual events ==
In 1985, Farm Heritage Days was initiated. This was an annual event held on the first weekend in August; it brought large crowds to Shelby for the old tractor and machinery displays, demonstrations, and a parade. The last Farm Heritage Days event was held in the late 90s. Today Shelby has "Shelby Days", a biennial event held over Memorial Day Weekend.

== Local media ==
Between 1926 and 1929, Dr. John Dunning and his father built radio station KGBY. The station provided entertainment, news, weather, markets and community announcements using local talent. The studio was located above the Buchholz Grocery Store, where the fire station is today. The last owner of the radio station was Ervin Taddiken of Shelby, with a modern broadcast studio for the era. Taddiken sold the rights, privileges and radio broadcasting equipment to Dr. George R. Miller of York, Nebraska, for the purpose of consolidating with KGBZ, in 1931.

Shelby is served by the Polk County News, based in Stromsburg.

== Notable people ==
- John R. Dunning, nuclear physicist and educator
- Howard Johansen, American drag racer, Inducted into International Drag Racing Hall of Fame in 1991 & Nebraska Auto Racing Hall of Fame in 2001.
- Theodore A. Kiesselbach, agronomist and educator
- Arjay Miller, one of Ford Motor Company's "Whiz Kids", Ford president (1963-1968); fourth dean of Stanford Business School (1969-1979)
- Gil Savery, journalist
- Curtis Tomasevicz, 2006 and 2010 U.S. Olympic bobsledder; won a gold medal in the 2010 Winter Olympics
- Terence Romaine von Duren, artist

== See also ==
- List of municipalities in Nebraska
