= Shirley Shahan =

American drag racer

- Retired: 1972

Super Stock
- Years active: 1950s to 1972

Awards
- 1997: International Motorsports Hall of Fame

Shirley Shahan (nicknamed the "Drag-On Lady") is a pioneering American woman drag racer.

Shahan in 1965 became the first woman to win an NHRA pro event. Her husband, H. L., prepared the cars she drove.

Shahan became a member of the International Motorsports Hall of Fame and the Drag Racing Hall of Fame in 1997.

== Background ==
Shirley Jean Epperson was born and raised in Visalia, California, daughter of a racing driver. The eldest of four children, she learned to drive at 10, and served as mechanic for her father when he went racing.

Before she began racing, Shahan was a passionate player of fastpitch softball, with an ability to throw to home plate from center field.

Like many early racers, including Shirley Muldowney, Shahan got started by street racing, beating local boys in her father's Studebaker pickup.

At 17, she married H. L. Shahan.

== Racing career ==
Shahan first became involved in drag racing in high school, when she assisted her father in working on his racer.

Her ability to beat the men frequently created friction. She, like Carol Cox, drew several protests after her victories; at the time, it cost just US$50 to file one.

Her husband, H. L., prepared the cars she drove. (H. L. Shahan worked for Ronnie Broadhead in Junior Stock and Butch Leal in Top Fuel.

Shahan began racing in the 1950s. She and her husband (who served as flagman {starter} for the Visalia drag strip on weekends) owned and raced two Chevrolets, one a 1955, later a daily-driven 1956 with a (then-new) 265 cu in (4,340 cc) small-block V8. Both raced, at first; Shahan (like Muldowney) proved the better driver.

She entered events at all the local tracks, including those in Bakersfield, Fremont, Madera, Santa Maria, and Half Moon Bay.

In 1959, Shahan won the first March Meet (at Bakersfield) in her Super Stock 1958 Chevrolet, beating forty men, among them professionals "Dyno Don" Nicholson, Hayden Proffitt, Tom Sturm, and Arlen Vanke.

The couple purchased a Chevrolet Impala with the RPO Z11 427 cu in (7,000 cc) big-block in 1963. At the time, H.L. tuned for Butch Leal and Ronnie Broadhead.

In 1964, Shahan was approached by Chrysler, and switched to a hemi Plymouth, as part of a team with Leal, working out of the Shahan shop in Tulare, California. The Chrysler deal forced her to learn to drive an automatic transmission for the 1965 season, over her objections; previously, she had always driven a stick shift. Nor did Chrysler pay her a salary, providing only the car and parts. At the time, she was working for SoCal Gas, and already had three children.

Shahan quickly learned to use the tachometer and the automatic transmission, and soon began winning at Division 7 events from Oregon and Washington to Utah and Nevada. She reached the Top Stock final at the 1965 Hot Rod Championship in Riverside.

It was while with the Chrysler factory team she followed her Hot Rod Championship win in 1966 with a final round finish at the AHRA Winter Nationals and earned a historic win, becoming the first woman to win a pro class at a national event, at the Winternationals, defeating Ken Heinemann. (The win put her on the cover of National Dragster.) She had been preceded by the likes of Roberta Leighton, Bunny Burkett, and the first woman to win at an NHRA national event, Carol Cox, who won in Stock in 1962. On 15 April 1966, she quit her day job to concentrate on Super Stock racing, continuing all summer, match racing all over the U.S., into Mexico, and as far away as Hawaii, winning more often than she lost. H.L. switched the Impala from carburetors to fuel injection, as well as moving the rear axle forward, precursor to the technique used by Funny Cars.

Shahan raced full-time until 1968. In that time, she also entered Mobil Economy Runs for Chrysler in that period, placing second, fourth, and (in 1968) first, even defeating Chrysler factory driver Scott Harvey.

Shahan went to AMC in 1968, driving a Super Stock 390 cu in (6,400 cc) AMX (which was also sometimes run in Pro Stock), while also serving as spokesman off-track. In addition, she was paid a salary and a given personal car. This also enabled her to remain closer to home. The AMX also returned her to a stick shift.

Shahan qualified #8 at the 1969 AHRA Winter Nationals, but was eliminated in the semi-final by #11 qualifier Ed Terry.

The AMX gave Shahan a class win at the 1970 NHRA Winternationals, and allowed her to set low e.t. and top speed records for the class over the course of the season. While Shahan did qualify for the U.S. Nationals, she was disallowed due to a technical infraction.

Shahan qualified #22 for the 1971 Supernationals, being eliminated in round one by the 1971 Plymouth Barracuda of #6 qualifier (& ultimate event winner) Ronnie Sox.

Shahan reached the semi-final at the 1971 AHRA Gateway Nationals, being eliminated by the 1970 Dodge Charger of event winner Tom Haller.

At the 1971 U.S. Nationals, Shahan and husband H.L. got two AMCs into the Pro Stock field, hers in the thirty-first slot; both were eliminated in Round One, Shahan losing to "Fast Eddie" Schartman's Mercury Comet. It would be twenty-one more years before another woman would win a round in Pro Stock. AMC quit drag racing in 1972, and when her husband got an opportunity to build racing engines full-time, his attention was diverted, so Shahan quit racing.

Shahan usually drove a Super Stock car, but also had the opportunity to drive an A/FX fuel funny car.

== Personal life ==
Shahan worked for SoCal Gas Company for over thirty years before retiring.

In 1966, while match racing around the U.S., Shahan was a contestant on "Hollywood Squares" and "To Tell the Truth" (where, she confesses, Bill Cullen guessed right she was a drag racer). The 1966 Winternationals win also attracted the attention of ABC's "Wide World of Sports".

Shahan divorced H. L., and has been married to her second husband, Ken Bridges, for over forty years.

Shahan has three children. Her youngest son, Steven, was on the pit crew of two top fuel teams, one of them Ed McCulloch's. Her youngest son, Robert, races a replica of her 1968 Dodge Dart. Her daughter, Janet (the eldest), and her husband operate a Lucas Oil-sponsored tractor puller called Git-R-Done. She has twenty-seven grandchildren.

In her spare time, Shahan plays softball and golf. She still lives in Tulare, California.

In 1997, Shahan was inducted into the Drag Racing Hall of Fame.

As of 2008, at 70, Shahan still competed in some nostalgia drag racing events.

== Sources ==
- Taylor, Thom. "Roddin' @Random: Take 5 [sic] with Shirley Shahan" in Hot Rod, April 2017, pp. 16–17.
