= More Aggravation III =

Body and chassis
- Class: Alcohol Competition, Supercharged (AA/CD)
- Body style: Front-engined streamliner dragster

Powertrain
- Engine: Supercharged 484 cu in (7,930 cc) hemi

More Aggravation III is a streamliner slingshot dragster.

Built by Al Bergler, who did interiors for Funny Cars and bodies for dragsters at the Logge Bros. shop in Detroit, Michigan, the car was sponsored by Gratiot Auto, also in Detroit. It had a dropped axle with bicycle wheels, zoomie pipes, and a fully enclosed cockpit.

More Aggravation III was powered by a 484 cu in (7,930 cc) hemi and ran in AA/CD (supercharged A Competition Dragster), setting a best effort of 7.80 seconds at 190 mph (310 km/h), on gasoline.

At the 1967 NHRA Winternationals, More Aggravation III took home both the AA/CD trophy and "Best Appearing Car" award.

== Sources ==
- Taylor, Thom. "Beauty Beyond the Twilight Zone" in Hot Rod, April 2017, pp. 30–43.
