= Motorsports Hall of Fame of America =

Hall of fame for American motorsports personalities

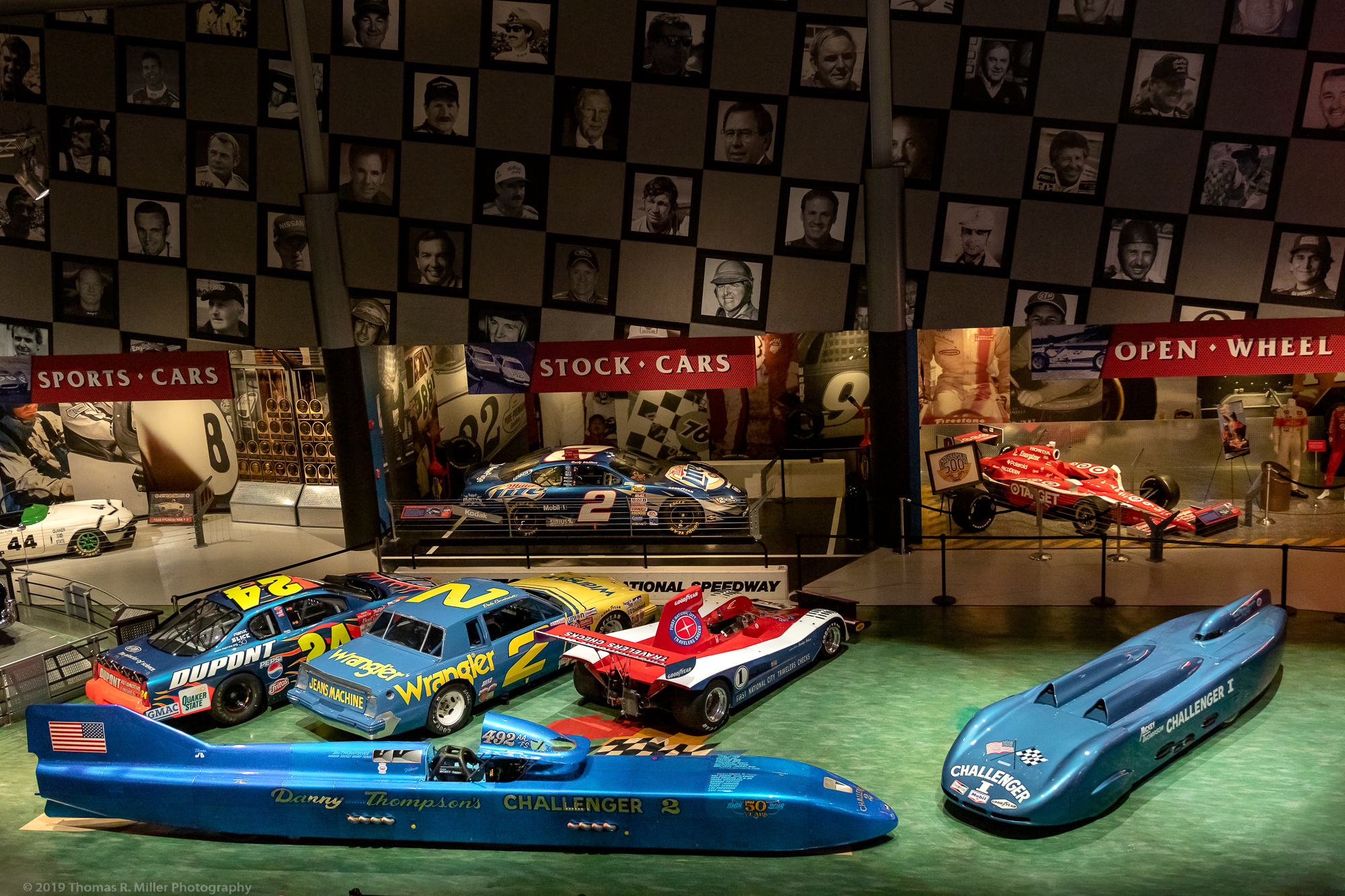
- MSHFA Hall of Heroes in 2019
- Established: 1986
- Location: 1801 West International Speedway Boulveard, Daytona Beach, Florida
- Coordinates: 29°11′8″N 81°4′10″W
- Founders: Larry G. Ciancio; Ron Watson
- Owners: Motorsports Museum and Hall of Fame of America Foundation, Inc.
- Website: mshf.com

The Motorsports Hall of Fame of America (MSHFA) is a hall of fame that honors motorsports competitors and contributors from the United States from all disciplines, with categories for Open Wheel, Stock Cars, Powerboats, Drag Racing, Motorcycles, Sports Cars, Aviation, at Large, Off-Road and Historic. Periodic recognition is given to specialty categories including Speed Records, Business and Technology. Its annual Induction Ceremony is attended by notables throughout the motorsports community and is reported on widely.

== History ==
The MSHFA was incorporated in 1986 as an IRS 501(c)(3) nonprofit organization by civic leaders of the City of Novi, Michigan, led by Founding Chairman Larry G. Ciancio. Its inaugural Induction Ceremony was held in 1989. Ron Watson was its founding President and continued to serve in that capacity until his untimely death in October 2019. He was succeeded as president at his request by noted motorsports author and historian and longtime MSHFA board member George Levy.

The mission of the MSHFA is to “further the American core values of leadership, creativity, originality, teamwork and spirit of competition embodied in motorsports.” The MSHFA is operated by the nonprofit Motorsports Museum and Hall of Fame of America Foundation Inc.

== Induction ==
=== Induction process ===
Induction eligibility is open to individuals who have participated in driving, piloting, owning, designing, building, supporting, maintaining, preparing, or promoting motorized vehicles to pursue speed, distance, or other records. To qualify for induction, candidates must either have been retired for at least three years or have been actively engaged at the highest level of their motorsports discipline for at least 20 years. Induction is restricted to United States citizens or non-citizens who have achieved notable motorsports accomplishments within the U.S.

Induction is decided by a straight vote among 200 racing experts: historians, experienced journalists, category experts and existing inductees. The voting process is overseen by certified accountants.

Every year there are two rounds of voting. The first is conducted among a 100-voter nominating committee to determine the six finalists in each category. The second, open to all 200 voters, decides that year's inductee in each category. Each inductee receives the Hall of Fame's prestigious “Horsepower” award — an original bronze statuette by renowned Ann Arbor, Michigan sculptor Michael Curtis. Curtis sculptures have been presented both to and by United States Presidents .

The inaugural Motorsports Hall of Fame of America class in 1989 featured Cannon Ball Baker (Motorcycles), James Doolittle (Aviation), A. J. Foyt (Open Wheel), Don Garlits (Drag Racing), Phil Hill (Sports Cars), Bill Muncey (Powerboats), Barney Oldfield (Historic) and Richard Petty (Stock Cars).

=== Induction ceremony ===
The annual Induction Ceremony is the MSHFA's premier event and takes place every March in Daytona Beach, Florida. The event incorporates motorsports legends past and present, just as it features new inductees on the main stage. Traditionally, each inductee is presented for induction by another prominent figure in the motorsports community. In 2019, multi-time champions Jimmie Johnson, Jack Beckman, Don Prudhomme and Scott Dixon, Indianapolis Motor Speedway President Doug Boles, former American Suzuki Vice President Mel Harris and automotive designer Peter Brock took the stage and presented Tony Stewart, Don Schumacher, Linda Vaughn, Dario Franchitti, Augie Duesenberg, Kevin Schwantz and Phil Remington respectively for induction at the black-tie ceremony.

The Class of 2020 includes Red Byron (Historic), Chris Carr (Motorcycles), Floyd Clymer (At Large), Wally Dallenbach (Open Wheel), Rick Hendrick (Stock Cars), Jacky Ickx (Sports Cars), Tiny Lund (Historic), “Ohio George” Montgomery (Drag Racing) and Ivan “Ironman” Stewart (Off-Road).

The two-day induction experience includes several other events as well, including the Heroes of Horsepower reception held in the MSHFA museum the night before the black-tie ceremony at which the new inductees unveil their permanent Hall of Fame sculptures. Additionally, the Heritage Luncheon spotlights the induction of the honorees in the Historic category. The Inductee Breakfast allows the incoming class and returning Hall of Famers to open up in a lively Q&A session. Admission to all events is open to the public via tickets purchased in advance.

== Museum ==
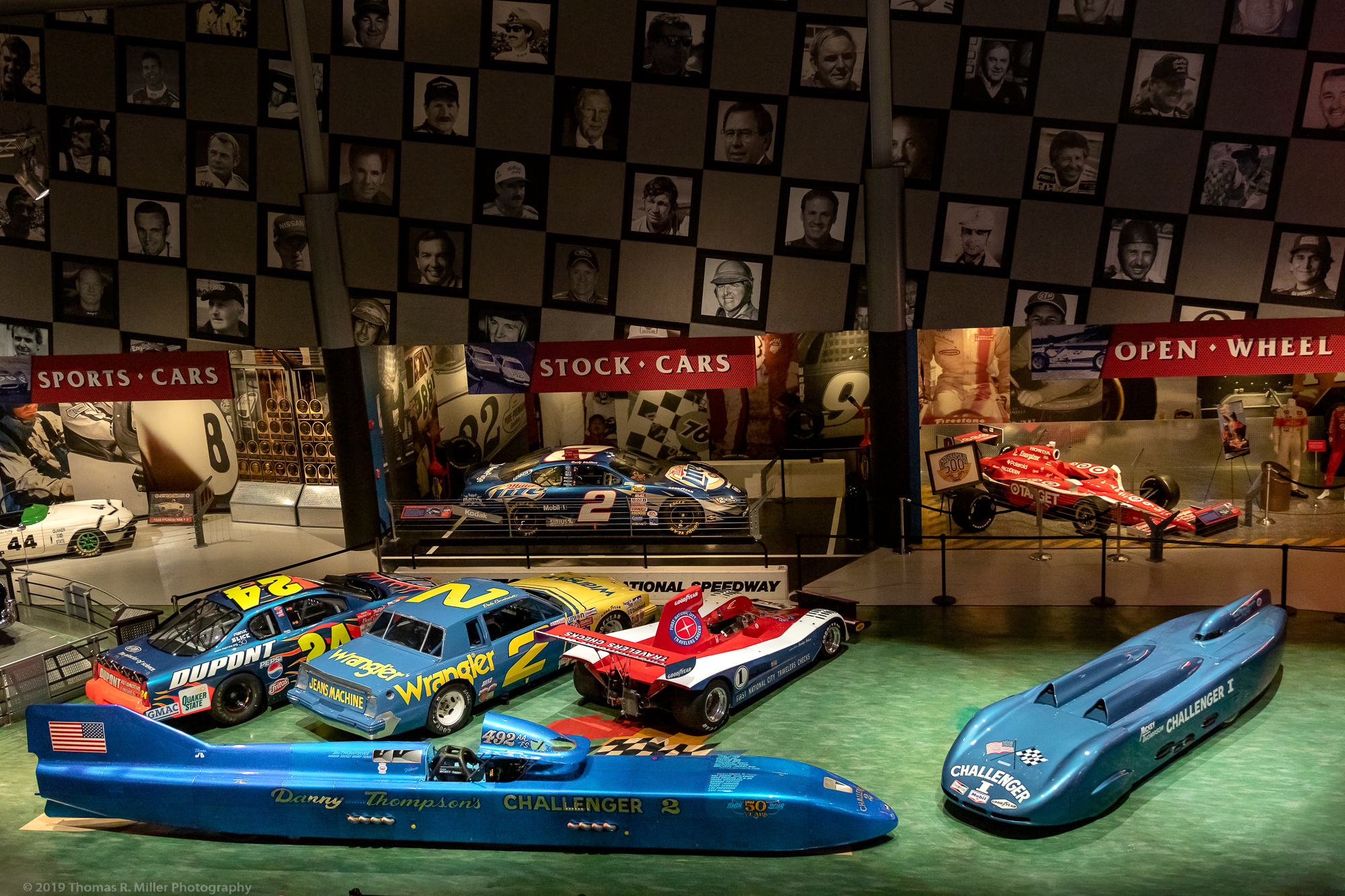
The Motorsports Hall of Fame of America museum on the grounds of Daytona International Speedway showcases vehicles and memorabilia from all forms of motorsports and attracts more than 100,000 visitors per year.

The Motorsports Hall of Fame of America museum on the grounds of Daytona International Speedway welcomes more than 100,000 visitors per year. The museum was originally located in Novi, Michigan, birthplace of the famous Novi Special Indianapolis 500 racecars. The museum was housed inside a leased hall at the Novi Expo Center from 1994 to 2010. It later moved to the Detroit Science Center in Detroit, Michigan from 2010 to 2015 before relocating to Daytona Beach, Florida. The museum is housed within the Ticket and Tours Building at Daytona International Speedway. Admission is open daily as part of regular speedway tours.

On display are vehicles and artifacts related to the Hall of Fame's inductees and achievements. Examples include historic racing vehicles, memorabilia, informational displays and plaques honoring the MSHFA's more than 260 inductees. There are also two movie theaters featuring motorsports content.

== Research ==
The MSHFA also serves as a research organization, with a network of experts on motorsports topics. It fields a broad range of questions on motorsports topics from journalists, historians, researchers and individuals.

== Reception ==
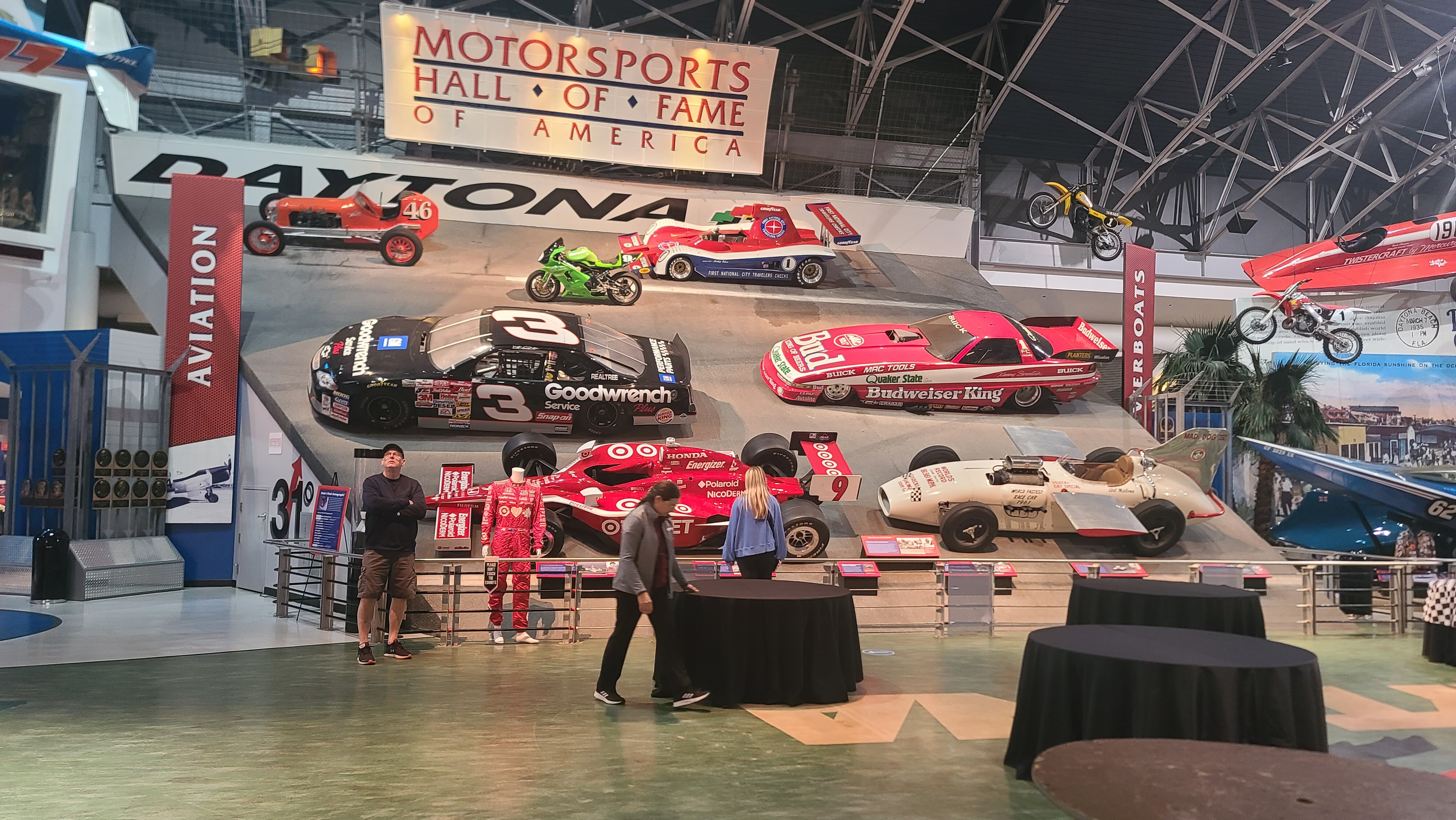
Various cars on display on the 31 degree banked track (the same dimensions as the Daytona 500 corner) at the Motorsports Hall of Fame at Daytona International Speedway.

The Motorsports Hall of Fame of America's Induction Ceremony has been attended by major names in the motorsports world throughout its history. Recent Honorary chairmen have included Formula 1 CEO Chase Carey, 1978 Formula 1 World Champion Mario Andretti and 2004 NASCAR Cup Series Champion Kurt Busch. Autoweek said of the 2019 induction, “Emceed by the best in the business, broadcaster, former driver and 2009 inductee David Hobbs... it was arguably the smoothest, best-run ceremony in the Motorsports Hall of Fame of America's history.” The announcements of each new class of inductees are covered by TV outlets, magazines and websites, including ESPN, Forbes, INDYCAR, Autoweek, and Racer.

Other publications such as Autocar and Car and Driver have lauded the museum and its exhibits as an enthusiast destination.

== Class of 2025 ==
- Skip Barber
- Miguel Duhamel
- Carl Haas
- Ed Iskenderian
- Dale Jarrett
- Tony Schumacher
- Bill Stroppe

== Class of 2024 ==
- Austin Coil
- Scott Dixon +
- Jim Downing
- Dr. Bob Hubbard
- Bud Ekins
- Jimmie Johnson
- Paul Newman
- John Surtees

== Class of 2023 ==
- Zora Arkus-Duntov
- Henry Banks
- Dick Burleson
- Art Chester
- Ray Evernham
- Fonty Flock
- Darrell Gwynn
- Ab Jenkins
- Stephen Olvey and Terry Trammell

== Inductees ==
Person	Category	Inducted
J. C. Agajanian	At Large	1992
Bobby Allison	Stock Cars	1992
Davey Allison	Stock Cars	2021
Donnie Allison	Stock Cars	2011
Joe Amato	Drag Racing	2004
Mario Andretti	Open Wheel	1990+
Michael Andretti	Open Wheel	2008
Art Arfons	At Large	1991
Dale Armstrong	Drag Racing	2010
Buck Baker	Stock Cars	1998
Buddy Baker	Stock Cars	2008
Cannonball Baker	Motorcycles	1989
Ole Bardahl	Power Boats	2014
Raymond Beadle	Drag Racing	2014
Derek Bell	Sports Cars	2012
Kenny Bernstein	Drag Racing	2009
Tony Bettenhausen	Open Wheel	1997
George Bignotti	At Large	1993
John Bishop	Sports Cars	2014
Keith Black	Drag Racing	1995
Bob Bondurant	Sports Cars	2003
Neil Bonnett	Stock Cars	2012
Geoff Brabham	Sports Cars	2004
Everett Brashear	Motorcycles	2016
Clint Brawner	At Large	1998
Craig Breedlove	At Large	1993
Pete Brock	Sports Cars	2022
Jimmy Bryan	Open Wheel	1999
John Buttera	Drag Racing	2018
Red Byron	Historic	2020
Malcolm Campbell	At Large	1994
Bill Cantrell	Power Boats	1992
Ricky Carmichael	Motorcycles	2015
Tom Carnegie	At Large	2006+
Chris Carr	Motorcycles	2020
Hélio Castroneves	Open Wheel	2022+
Colin Chapman	At Large	1997
Dean Chenoweth	Power Boats	1991
Gaston Chevrolet	Historic	2002
Louis Chevrolet	Historic	1995
Richard Childress	Stock Cars	2016
Joie Chitwood	Historic	2010
Art Chrisman	Drag Racing	1997
Jim Clark	Open Wheel	1990
Cook Cleland	Air Racing	2000
Floyd Clymer	At Large	2020
John Cobb	Historic	2021
Jacqueline Cochran	Air Racing	1993
Sid Collins	At Large	2011
Betty Cook	Power Boats	1996
Earl Cooper	Historic	2001
Briggs Cunningham	Sports Cars	1997
Glenn Curtiss	Air Racing	1990
Wally Dallenbach Sr.	Open Wheel	2020
Jimmy Davis	Motorcycles	1997
Tom D'Eath	Power Boats	2000
Roger DeCoster	Motorcycles	1994
Ralph DePalma	Historic	1992
Pete DePaolo	Historic	1995
Larry Dixon Jr.	Drag Racing	2021
Mark Donohue	Sports Cars	1990
Ed Donovan	Drag Racing	2003
Jimmy Doolittle	Air Racing	1989
Pop Dreyer	Historic	2012
Augie Duesenberg	Historic	2019
Fred Duesenberg	Historic	1997
Amelia Earhart	Air Racing	1992
Dale Earnhardt	Stock Cars	2002+
Chris Economaki	At Large	1994
Vic Edelbrock	At Large	2012
Bill Elliott	Stock Cars	2007+
Walker Evans	At Large	2015
Bill Falck	Air Racing	1994
John Fitch	Sports Cars	2007
Emerson Fittipaldi	Open Wheel	2001
Tim Flock	Stock Cars	1999
Carl Fisher	Historic	2018
George Follmer	Sports Cars	1999
Elliott Forbes-Robinson	Sports Cars	2006
John Force	Drag Racing	2008
Henry Ford	Historic	1996
Danny Foster	Power Boats	2005
A. J. Foyt	Open Wheel	1989+
Bill France Jr.	Stock Cars	2004+
Bill France Sr.	Stock Cars	1990
Dario Franchitti	Open Wheel	2019
Gary Gabelich	At Large	2016
Chip Ganassi	Open Wheel	2016
Don Garlits	Drag Racing	1989
Richie Ginther	Sports Cars	2008
Shav Glick	At Large	2004
Bob Glidden	Drag Racing	1994+
Paul Goldsmith	Stock Cars	2008
Jeff Gordon	Stock Cars	2018
Ricky Graham	Motorcycles	2014
Andy Granatelli	At Large	2001
Darryl Greenamyer	Air Racing	1997
Peter Gregg	Sports Cars	2000
Masten Gregory	Sports Cars	2013
Dan Gurney	Sports Cars	1991
Janet Guthrie	Open Wheel	2021
Jim Hall	Sports Cars	1994
Chip Hanauer	Power Boats	1995+
Sam Hanks	Open Wheel	2000
Bob Hannah	Motorcycles	2000
Ray Harroun	Historic	2000
C. J. "Pappy" Hart	Drag Racing	1999
Nicky Hayden	Motorcycles	2021
Hurley Haywood	Sports Cars	2005+
Rick Hendrick	Stock Cars	2020
Eddie Hill	Drag Racing	2002
Phil Hill	Sports Cars	1989
Tommy Hinnershitz	Historic	2003
David Hobbs	Sports Cars	2009
Al Holbert	Sports Cars	1993
John Holman	At Large	2005
Ted Horn	Open Wheel	1993
Howard Hughes	Aviation	2018
Tony Hulman	At Large	1991
Denis Hulme	Sports Cars	1998
Jacky Ickx	Sports Cars	2020
Tommy Ivo	Drag Racing	2005
Ned Jarrett	Stock Cars	1997
Bill Jenkins	Drag Racing	1996
Gordon Johncock	Open Wheel	2002
Junior Johnson	Stock Cars	1991+
Ricky Johnson	Motorcycles	2012
Warren Johnson	Drag Racing	2015
Parnelli Jones	At Large	1992
Ted Jones	Power Boats	2003
Connie Kalitta	Drag Racing	1992
Chris Karamesines	Drag Racing	2006
Tommy Kendall	Sports Cars	2015
Mel Kenyon	Open Wheel	2003
Carl Kiekhaefer	Power Boats	1998
Steve Kinser	Open Wheel	2017
Dick Klamfoth	Motorcycles	2017
Alan Kulwicki	Stock Cars	2010
Frank Kurtis	At Large	1999
Terry Labonte	Stock Cars	2017
Brad Lackey	Motorcycles	2013
Dick LaHaie	Drag Racing	2022
Eddie Lawson	Motorcycles	2002
Joe Leonard	Motorcycles	1991
Tony LeVier	Air Racing	2001
Bernie Little	Power Boats	1994
Frank Lockhart	Historic	1999
Fred Lorenzen	Stock Cars	2001
Tiny Lund	Historic	2020
Arie Luyendyk	Open Wheel	2014
Dick Mann	Motorcycles	1993
Nigel Mansell	Open Wheel	2006
Paul Mantz	Air Racing	2002
Bart Markel	Motorcycles	1999
Mark Martin	Stock Cars	2015
Banjo Matthews	Business	2022
Rex Mays	Historic	1995
Dave McClelland	Drag Racing	2016
Denise McCluggage	Media	2022
Roger McCluskey	Open Wheel	2011
Ed McCulloch	Drag Racing	2011
Tom McEwen	Drag Racing	2001
Jim McGee	Historic	2007
Jeremy McGrath	Motorcycles	2010
Hershel McGriff	Stock Cars	2006
Bruce McLaren	Sports Cars	1995
Rick Mears	Open Wheel	1998
Leo Mehl	Historic	2007
Fred Merkel	Motorcycles	2018
Louis Meyer	Historic	1993
Ken Miles	Sports Cars	2001
Harry Miller	Historic	1999
Robin Miller	Media	2021
Tommy Milton	Historic	1998
George Montgomery	Drag Racing	2020
Ralph Moody	At Large	2005
Shirley Muldowney	Drag Racing	1990
Bill Muncey	Power Boats	1989
Fran Muncey	Power Boats	2021
Jimmy Murphy	Historic	1998
Paula Murphy	Drag Racing	2017
Ron Musson	Power Boats	1993
Duke Nalon	Historic	2015
Ray Nichels	Historic	2021
Don Nicholson	Drag Racing	1998
Gary Nixon	Motorcycles	2003
Bob Nordskog	Power Boats	1997
Fred Offenhauser	At Large	2002
Barney Oldfield	At Large	1989
Danny Ongais	Drag Racing	2000
Augie Pabst	Sports Cars	2011
Scott Parker	Motorcycles	2009
Raymond Parks	Historic	2022
Wally Parks	Drag Racing	1993
Benny Parsons	Stock Cars	2005
Johnnie Parsons	Historic	2004
Pat Patrick	Open Wheel	2018
David Pearson	Stock Cars	1993
Bruce Penhall	Motorcycles	2011
Roger Penske	At Large	1995
Joe Petrali	Motorcycles	1992
Lee Petty	Stock Cars	1996
Richard Petty	Stock Cars	1989+
Ed Pink	Drag Racing	2012
Sam Posey	Sports Cars	2016
Don Prudhomme	Drag Racing	1991
Scott Pruett	Sports Cars	2017+
Bobby Rahal	Open Wheel	2004
Wayne Rainey	Motorcycles	2008
Jim Rathmann	Open Wheel	2007
Brian Redman	Sports Cars	2002
Phil Remington	Sports Cars	2019
Carroll Resweber	Motorcycles	1998
Peter Revson	Sports Cars	1996
Les Richter	At Large	2009
Eddie Rickenbacker	Historic	1994
Fireball Roberts	Stock Cars	1995
Kenny Roberts	Motorcycles	1990
Mauri Rose	Historic	1996
Jack Roush	Stock Cars	2022
Lloyd Ruby	Open Wheel	2015
Johnny Rutherford	Open Wheel	1996
Troy Ruttman	Historic	2005
Don Schumacher	Drag Racing	2019
Kevin Schwantz	Motorcycles	2019
Bill Seebold	Power Boats	1999
Wilbur Shaw	Historic	1991
Carroll Shelby	Sports Cars	1992
Lyle Shelton	Air Racing	1999
Bill Simpson	At Large	2003
Betty Skelton	At Large	2008
Mira Slovak	Power Boats	2001
Malcolm Smith	Motorcycles	1996
Tom Sneva	Open Wheel	2005
Freddie Spencer	Motorcycles	2001
Jay Springsteen	Motorcycles	2005
Ken Squier	At Large	2010
Ivan Stewart	Off Road	2020
Tony Stewart	Stock Cars	2019
Judy Stropus	Sports Cars	2021
Danny Sullivan	Open Wheel	2012
Bob Sweikert	Historic	2016
Marshall Teague	Historic	2014
Herb Thomas	Historic	2017
Mickey Thompson	At Large	1990
Jerry Titus	Sports Cars	2010
Bob Tullius	Sports Cars	2018
Curtis Turner	Stock Cars	2006
Roscoe Turner	Air Racing	1991
Bobby Unser	Open Wheel	1994
Al Unser	Open Wheel	1991
Al Unser Jr.	Open Wheel	2009
Terry Vance & Byron Hines*	Motorcycles	2022
Linda Vaughn	At Large	2019
Don Vesco	Motorcycles	2004
Rich Vogler	Midgets	2010
Bill Vukovich	Open Wheel	1992
Rusty Wallace	Stock Cars	2014
Darrell Waltrip	Stock Cars	2003
Jeff Ward	Motorcycles	2006
Rodger Ward	Open Wheel	1995
A. J. Watson	At Large	1996
Joe Weatherly	Historic	2009
Humpy Wheeler	Stock Cars	2009
Ed Winfield	Historic	2011
Steve Wittman	Air Racing	1998
Wood Brothers	Stock Cars	2000
Gar Wood	Power Boats	1990
Cale Yarborough	Stock Cars	1994
Brock Yates	At Large	2017
Smokey Yunick	At Large	2000

+ Person inducted under special rule. Usually, an inductee must have been retired for at least three years in their field. However, inductees may also have been engaged at the top level of his or her area of motorsports for at least 20 years, and if that is the case, the retirement rule is waived.

* Terry Vance and Byron Hines were inducted together as "Vance & Hines."

== See also ==
- International Drag Racing Hall of Fame
- International Motorsports Hall of Fame
- Long Beach Motorsports Walk of Fame
- NASCAR Hall of Fame
