= Howard Johansen =

- Nationality: American

Championship titles
- 1955: National Hot Rod Association (NHRA) C/Gas national title

Howard Johansen was an American gasser drag racer. He won the first ever National Hot Rod Association (NHRA) C/Gas national title, at Great Bend, Kansas, in 1955.

== History ==
Driving a 1955 Chevrolet, Johansen won NHRA's first ever C/Gas national title, at Great Bend, Kansas, in 1955. He recorded a speed of 94.53 mph (152.13 km/h). (His elapsed time was not recorded or has not been preserved.)

Johansen later founded the camshaft-grinding company Howard Cams. which sponsored several well-known racing cars, including Rattler (driven by Larry Dixon Sr., to a Top Fuel Eliminator win at the Hot Rod Magazine Championship Drag Races in 1968). The company was founded by Howard and his wife as Howards Power & Racing Equipment, as a manufacturer of racing cams in 1945. Howard and his wife retired in 1965 and turned the business over to his oldest son, Jerry, who ran the company until 1985. Jerry was considered one of the top engine turners of his day, and along with Don Madden, ran a series of “Howards Cams Rattler” and “Howards Cams Special” top fuel cars out of the shop as test beds for new products.

== Bio ==
Johansen was born and raised on a farm near Shelby, Nebraska. Although his formal education ended with the eighth grade, he demonstrated his mechanical ability at an early age by keeping equipment on the family farm operating smoothly.

Johansen moved to Los Angeles in 1941. Following the war, he raced Roadsters for a short period of time with the California Roadster Association (CRA) but soon realized he had the unique ability to create and build racing components that could help other racers make their cars more competitive.

Johansen began modifying engine camshafts and when racers began relying on him to provide cams that would win races, he opened a business which would become known as Howard's Cams. In addition to building his first cam grinding equipment, Johansen also created a variety of engine components including fuel injection systems, aluminum heads, forged aluminum connecting rods, and aluminum flywheels.

Johansen developed a love for speed runs and in the late 1940s fielded cars at Muroc Dry Lake and the Bonneville Salt Flats. By the mid 1950s, his drag race cars were winning consistently at NHRA's events all over the country and in 1955, he drove to the first-ever NHRA C/Gas national title in Great Bend, Kansas.

In 1957, Johansen campaigned two stock cars on the NASCAR circuit which were driven by Marshall Sargent and Rex White. Those cars finished seventh and ninth place respectively in the NASCAR point standings that season.

A year later, in 1958, Johansen debuted the crowning achievement of his career, "The Twin Bears Digger" a rail dragster featuring side-by-side blown Chevrolet engines. From 1958 through 1960, Johansen raced the car around the West Coast with Glen Ward in the cockpit. In 1961, with Jack Chrisman at the controls, the car won the first NHRA Winternationals and later that season Chrisman set the NHRA Top Eliminator (Top Gas) elapsed time record on board the machine, clocking an 8.78 second run. At the end of the 1961 season, Chrisman and "Twin Bears," were recognized as the NHRA World Champions.

Over the years, Johansen's company, Howard's Cams, owned and sponsored numerous well-known drag cars including "The Rattler" driven by Larry Dixon to a Top Fuel Eliminator win at the Hot Rod Magazine Championships in 1968 and the NHRA Winternationals in 1969.

Johansen nducted into International Drag Racing Hall of Fame in 1991 & Nebraska Auto Racing Hall of Fame in 2001.

Respected as a true racing innovator, Johansen died at his home in 1988.

== Sources ==
- Davis, Larry. Gasser Wars, North Branch, MN: Cartech, 2003, pp. 13 caption and 183-8.
- Nebraska Auto Racing Hall of Fame Inductees 2001
