= George Levy =

American motorsports author

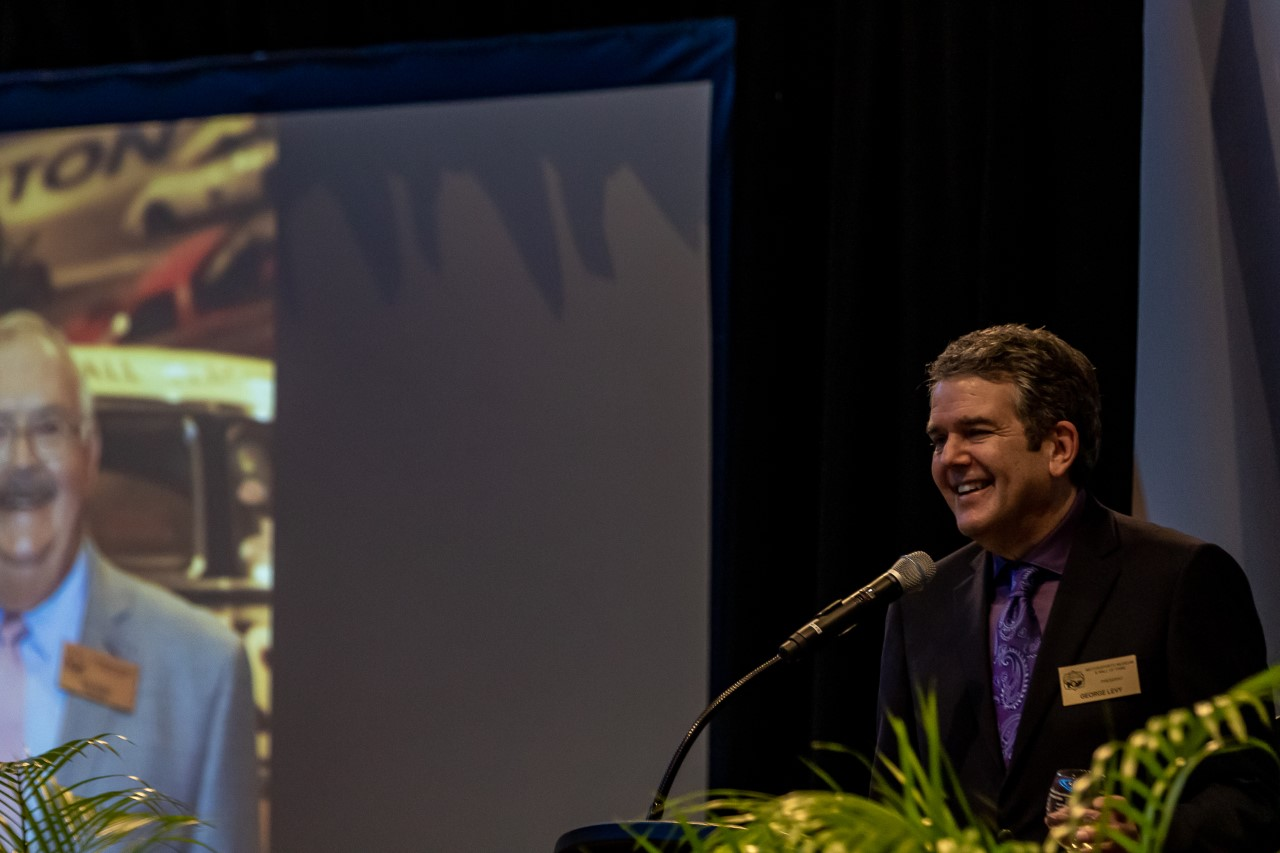
- Born: George Damon Levy; January 30, 1956 (age 70); Brookline, Massachusetts, U.S.
- Children: Zachary Levy, Casey Levy
- Writing career
- Genre: Motorsports

George Damon Levy (born January 30, 1956) is a motorsports author, speaker, and historian and former editor of the enthusiast magazine Autoweek, and retired president of the Motorsports Hall of Fame of America. He has contributed to various automotive publications and websites, including Motor Sport, Autoweek, RACER, Car and Driver and Vintage Motorsport. He is a frequent collaborator with his longtime friend, the motorsports photographer Pete Biro. He is best known for their 2016 book Can-am 50th Anniversary: Flat Out with North America’s Greatest Race Series, which earned a Gold Medal in the 2017 International Automotive Media Competition, F1 Mavericks: The Men and Machines that Revolutionized Formula 1 Racing (2019), his 2024 book with multiple motorsports photographers, Texas Legend: Jim Hall and his Chaparrals, and Motorsports Mavericks: Daring Drivers, Brilliant Designers, and Milestone Events that Reshaped F1, Indy, NASCAR, Le Mans and More (2026).

== Early life ==
George Levy was born and raised in Brookline, Massachusetts. He became a racing fan after reading Carroll Shelby and John Bentley's The Cobra Story (1965), Robert Daley's Cars At Speed (1961) and the Jim Clark autobiography, Jim Clark At The Wheel (1966), ghostwritten by Clark's longtime friend Graham Gauld. Another book that would prove pivotal to his later career was Peter Manso's VROOOM!! Conversations with the Grand Prix Champions (1969). He learned to drive in a 1964½ Ford Mustang. He was one of the East Coast's earliest sport compact enthusiasts with a lowered and flared Datsun 510. Later, he owned the Brock Racing Enterprises (BRE) “Screaming Yellow Zonker” 510. Levy moved to Detroit in 1980 before moving to the Daytona Beach, Florida area in 2019 to assume his duties at the Motorsports Hall of Fame of America.

== Career ==
=== Journalism ===
Levy began his career in journalism at Autoweek in 1980. He was promoted to editor at 27. Levy broke a number of major stories during his editorship, including Ford's plan to replace the Ford Mustang with a front-wheel-drive V6-powered car built by Japanese partner Mazda. The resulting furor helped persuade Ford to continue the classic V8, rear-drive Mustang and rename the Mazda-based model, then only months from production, Probe. “Autoweek published an April (1987) cover story titled ‘The New Mustang’ which laid out the blasphemy in full,” Road & Track wrote in 2013. “Fans pelted Ford with hundreds of thousands of letters against the proposed change to a car that had become an American icon.”

=== Authorship ===
In recent years, Levy has begun writing books as well, all of which have been collaborations with motorsports photographer Pete Biro. Levy's works focus on 1960s and 1970s motorsports.

In 2016, Levy and Biro published their first collaboration, Can-am 50th Anniversary: Flat Out with North America’s Greatest Race Series. The book documents the 1966-1974 North American Canadian American Challenge Cup Series. Biro was able to supply photos from races he shot across the series’ nine seasons. Levy wrote the text, based on his own research plus interviews with over 75 of the original participants, from “gofers” to superstars. Motorsports icons interviewed for Can-Am 50th Anniversary include Jim Hall, Jackie Stewart, Mario Andretti, Dan Gurney, Stirling Moss, John Surtees and Parnelli Jones.

Car and Driver cited it as one of the “Sixteen Books Every Auto Enthusiast Should Read,” declaring it “The best account we have of the fierce, open-spec Can-Am series.” In 2017, Can-am 50th Anniversary was awarded a Gold Medal in the International Automotive Media Competition.

Levy and Biro's second book, F1 Mavericks: The Men and Machines that Revolutionized Formula 1 Racing, was released in July, 2019. It features a foreword by Mario Andretti and an afterword by the late Niki Lauda.

Levy's most recent book, Texas Legend: Jim Hall and his Chaparrals, is the official biography of Chaparral founder Jim Hall. The 2024 work features the photography of many motorsports photographers, including Biro, Bernard Cahier, Hal Crocker, Dave Friedman, Pete Lyons, Dan Boyd, Lionel Birnbom and Pulitzer Prize winner Robert H. Jackson.

Of Texas Legend: Jim Hall and his Chaparrals, GrandPrix+ wrote, in its July 2024 issue, “For sure a leading contender in any Book of the Year contest and one that no inquisitive and self-respecting enthusiast should ignore. There’s only one thing I would take issue with, and that’s the sub-subtitle, ‘There’s always a better way.’ In the case of this masterpiece, that isn’t possible…”

=== Motorsports Hall of Fame of America ===
Levy began serving on the board of directors of the Motorsports Hall of Fame of America in 2012 and was chosen by Founding President Ron Watson to be his successor starting in 2020. Due to Watson's death in 2019, Levy assumed the position early. As President of the Hall of Fame, Levy oversaw the induction process, which adds new members every March at a black-tie banquet, and managed its multidiscipline museum on the grounds of Daytona International Speedway in Daytona Beach, Florida.

== List of works ==
- Can-am 50th Anniversary: Flat Out with North America’s Greatest Race Series. George Levy and Pete Biro, 2016.
- F1 Mavericks: The Men and Machines that Revolutionized Formula 1 Racing. George Levy and Pete Biro, 2019.
- Texas Legend: Jim Hall and his Chaparrals. George Levy, 2024.
- Motorsports Mavericks: Daring Drivers, Brilliant Designers, and Milestone Events that Reshaped F1, Indy, NASCAR, Le Mans and More, Pete Biro and George Levy, 2026.

== Awards ==
- 2017 Gold Medal in the International Automotive Media Competition
- 2024 Finalist: Book of the Year in the International Historic Motoring Awards
- 2024 Finalist: Suzuki Award for the Montagu of Beaulieu Trophy from the Guild of Motoring Writers
