= 1968 NHRA Winternationals =

National Hot Rod Association
- Venue: Auto Club Raceway
- Location: Pomona, California

The 1968 NHRA Winternationals (commonly known as the Winternats) were a National Hot Rod Association (NHRA) drag racing event, held at Auto Club Raceway, Pomona, California on 4 February.

== Results ==
=== Top Fuel ===
Top Fuel hosted several well-known racers, including Don "Big Daddy" Garlits (in Swamp Rat XIIA, Jerry "King" Ruth, Tom "Mongoo$e" McEwen (who qualified #2), Mike Snively (who qualified a Roland Leong-owned fueller #3), Don "The Snake" Prudhomme (1965 champion), and 1966 champion Mike Snively.

==== Round One ====
Jim Warren, who qualified #4, eliminated #20 qualifier "King" Ruth.

==== Round Two ====
Bob Downey lost to Warren.

==== Round Three ====
Conrad "Connie' Kalitta, #27 qualifier, was overcome by Ron Rolstad, and #24-qualifier Garlits fell to Warren.

==== Semi-final Round ====
Rolstad was eliminated by Dwight Salisbury (in the Rocky Childs car), while Dave Beebe lost to Warren.

==== Final Round ====
Warren defeated Salisbury, taking home a US$12,500 prize.

=== Altered ===
The Altered class win went to William "Wild Willie" Borsch, at the wheel of the AA/FA Winged Express.

=== Top Gas ===
In Top Gas, eventual winner Gordon Collett qualified #16. On the way to his win, he eliminated Gary Cochran, Rico Paris, and Norm Wilcox, before meeting Jack Jones in the final. The win earned Collett a US$8000 prize. It was Collett's third class win in a row at Pomona.

=== Super Stock ===
The 1968 Winter Nationals Super Stock final was a match-up between Dave Wren driving his old school 1963 Plymouth Savoy vs. Al Joniec in his 1968 Ford Mustang 428 Cobra Jet. When Dave Wren triggered the red light at the start, the Title went to Joniec and his Mustang, clocking an ET of 11.56 at 120.64 mph. This was the first National win for the Ford Drag Team's new 428 Cobra Jet Mustang.
