= Theodore A. Kiesselbach =

Theodore Alexander Kiesselbach (1884–1964) fondly referred to as "Mr. Corn" was an Agronomist, educator, author or co-author of over 140 articles, and an internationally renowned major developer of corn hybrids who lived in Lincoln, Nebraska.

Kiesselbach was born in Shelby, Nebraska to Alexander and Caroline Bayrhoffer Kiesselbach on March 14, 1884. He trained as both an undergraduate and graduate student at the University of Nebraska where he trained with Charles Bessey, receiving a BS in 1908, an MA in 1912, and a PhD in 1918. He joined the faculty of the University of Nebraska first as a field instructor in 1909 and in 1912 became a professor and member of the graduate faculty, a position he continued to hold until his retirement in 1952.

He played a key role in developing hybrid varieties of corn and helped improve other crops through his team's research in the Agronomy Department at University of Nebraska-Lincoln, College of Agriculture. In 1913 he developed the first hybrid corn variety in the western United States, and by the 1940s hybrids he developed were widely adopted, accounting for $42M of farm income in Nebraska alone in 1949. In 1949 he published "The Structure and Reproduction of Corn", a reference work which was widely adopted and reprinted until at least 1998. Among the students he trained at the University of Nebraska was Charles O. Gardner.

Kiesselbach was elected as a Fellow of the American Society of Agronomy in 1927 and was received the Hoblitzell National Award in 1951.
