= Kenny Youngblood =

American motorsports artist

- Born: 1945 or 1946 (age 80–81)
- Education: Pasadena City College
- Known for: Motorsports art
- Spouse: Terri Youngblood
- Children: 1
- Awards: International Drag Racing Hall of Fame Founder's Award (2014)

Kenny Youngblood is an American artist known for drag racing and hot rod subjects. He has created race car graphics, editorial illustrations, and limited-edition fine art prints since the late 1960s, signed "'Blood Did It". His best-known work includes the Wrangler paint scheme on Dale Earnhardt's Chevrolet Monte Carlo, the U.S. Army paint scheme on Don Prudhomme's Funny Car, and the logo for ZZ Top's Eliminator '33 Ford coupe.

National Dragster called him "the dean of drag racing artists" and a "superstar artist". In 2014, Youngblood received the Founder's Award from the International Drag Racing Hall of Fame.

== Early life and education ==
Youngblood grew up in Rosemead, California. His parents were artists, and his mother took him to art galleries on weekends. He attended his first drag race around age 13 and, by the end of high school, he and a friend had built a 1932 Ford coupe.

After school, he worked in a machine shop and as a technical illustrator in an aerospace firm. He studied art at Pasadena City College.

== Career ==
=== Early work ===
In the mid-1960s, Youngblood built and lettered his own dragster, and began racing it at Southern California strips in 1968. A fellow racer, Gary Messenger, asked him to letter his car, which brought him to Competition Fiberglass, run by Don Kirby and Dick Olsen, where he worked with leading Funny Car and Top Fuel teams in the early 1970s.

=== Racing Graphis ===
Around 1970, Youngblood met Bob Kachler, a motorsports promoter who ran Racing Graphis, a Long Beach collective of motorsports creatives that also published an eponymous magazine. He worked at Racing Graphis during the day and at Competition Fiberglass after hours. Kachler suggested he switch from oil paints to felt markers for speed, and together the Racing Graphis group developed sponsorship proposals, among them a Wonder Bread paint scheme for Don Schumacher's Funny Car, one of drag racing's first horizontal market sponsorships.

Through Racing Graphis, Youngblood met Car Craft editor Terry Cook, who published his illustrations, and promoter Jim Cook, whose clients included Parnelli Jones.

=== Solo career ===
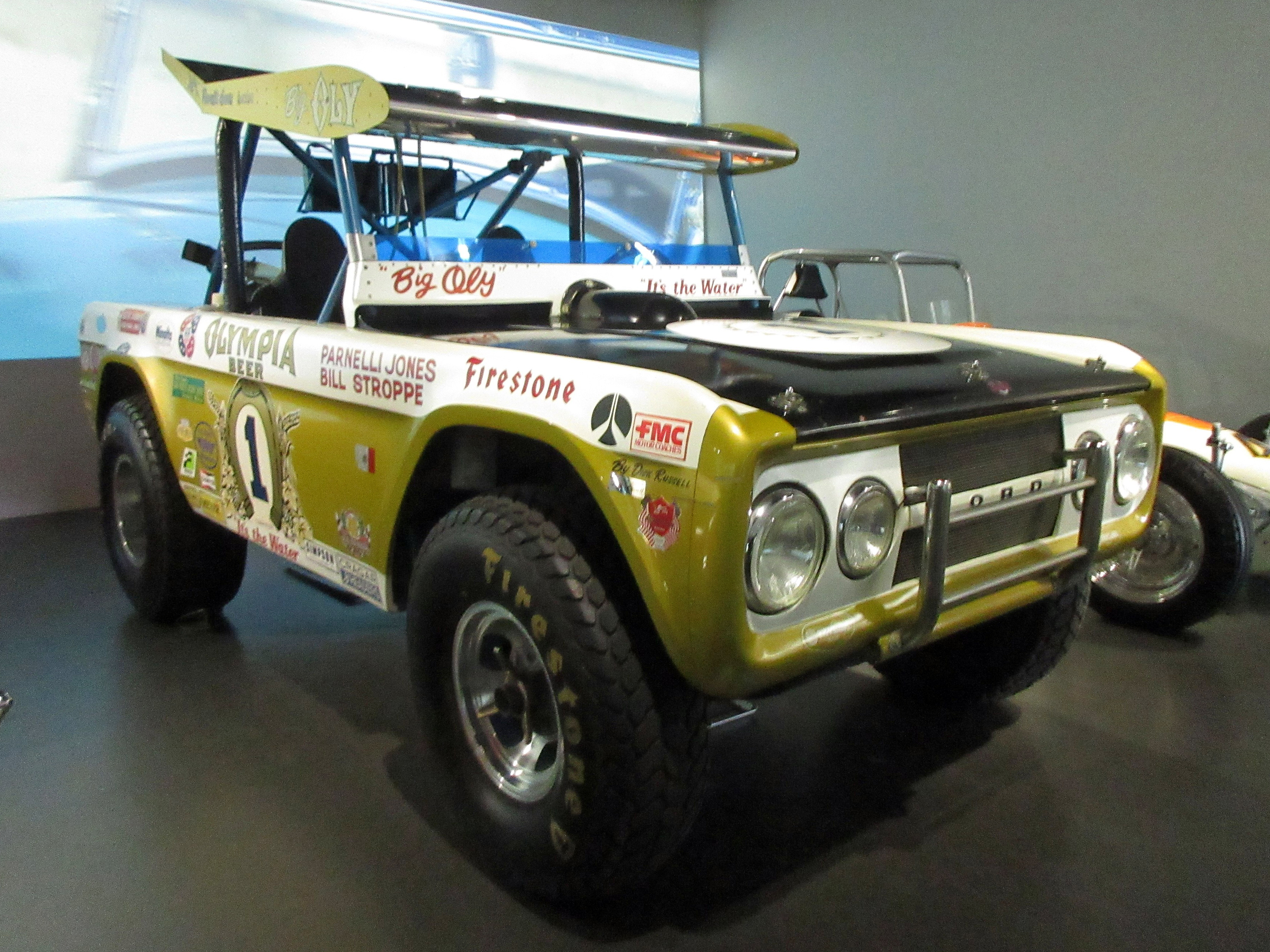
The "Big Oly" Vel's Parnelli Jones Ford Bronco at the Petersen Automotive Museum. Youngblood created renderings of the truck sponsorship proposal for the VPJ racing team.

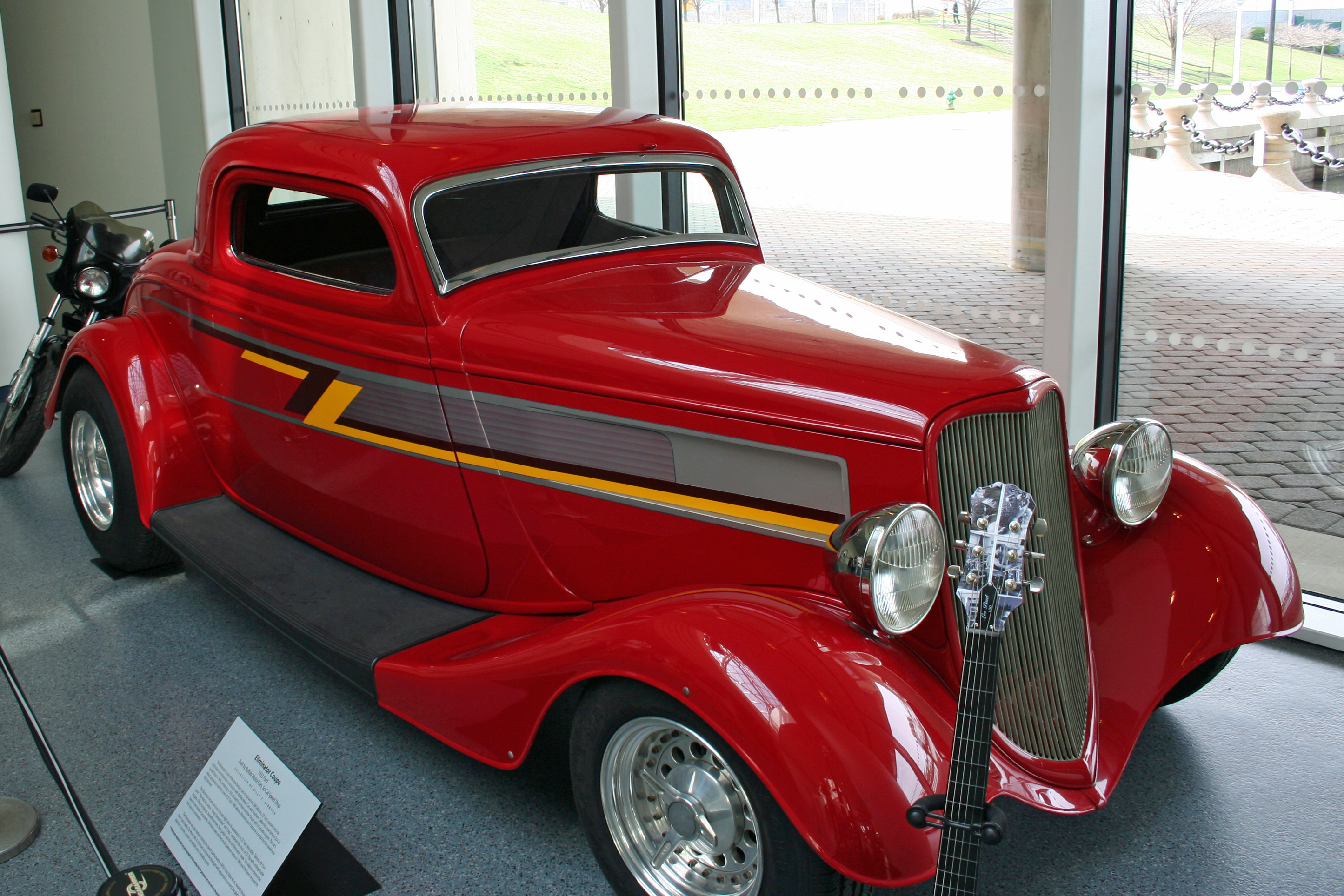
The Eliminator '33 Ford coupe at the Rock and Roll Hall of Fame, Cleveland. Youngblood designed the car's double-Z graphics.

Youngblood moved to his own studio in Santa Ana. From 1975 to 1985, he worked exclusively in motorsports, including NASCAR and IndyCar clients, as the field's only full-time graphic designer. His off-road work included renderings for the original Vel's Parnelli Jones "Big Oly" Ford Bronco and Mickey Thompson's Chevrolet LUV pickup.

Youngblood designed the U.S. Army paint scheme for Don Prudhomme's Funny Car; the sponsorship ran through the mid-to-late 1970s. He later designed the interlocking logo and paint scheme for ZZ Top's '33 Ford coupe, which was depicted on the cover of their 1983 album Eliminator, and is now on permanent display at the Rock and Roll Hall of Fame in Cleveland. Youngblood also designed the Wrangler paint scheme for Dale Earnhardt's NASCAR Chevrolet Monte Carlo, including the number 3.

=== Fine art ===
In the 1970s, Youngblood began making limited-edition fine art prints. Sales grew with the nostalgia racing wave of the following decade, and by the mid-1980s, he focused primarily on art prints. He opened the Youngblood Motorsports Gallery in 1992.

In 2011, racer T. J. Zizzo displayed Youngblood's work at NHRA events throughout the season in the so-called World's Fastest Art Gallery.

Youngblood painted the murals for the Lions Drag Strip Museum in Rancho Dominguez, California, part of the Lions Automobilia Foundation & Museum.

== Personal life ==
Youngblood and his wife, Terri, live in the Las Vegas area. They have a daughter.

A self-described "Jesus freak", Youngblood founded a Christian counseling ministry called Always An Answer.
