= Terence Romaine von Duren =

Terence Duren (July 9, 1904 – September 28, 1968) was an artist from Shelby, Nebraska during the post-World War II period. Duren is most widely known for his regionalist works, which drew on his rural upbringing. He is one of a group of Nebraska artists, including John Falter, Dale Nichols and Grant Reynard.

== Biography ==
Duren, the only child born to Bertha (Hartel) and Jean Henri Duren, was born in Shelby, Nebraska on July 9, 1904. Terence's mother Bertha died 8 months after his birth and he was reared by his father aunt Camilla Hartel.

He was diagnosed with polio at the age of six, was bedridden for over a year, unable to walk for nearly two years and his left arm was permanently weakened. His father gave him crayons and a tablet to occupy his time. According to the Museum of Nebraska Art, in an interview shortly before his death in 1968, Duren said at that point he knew he would become an artist.

Although he had no use of the upper portion of his left arm, Terence Duren played piano in jazz groups in Chicago while attending the Art Institute (1925-1931). He designed theatrical costumes that were worn by legendary actors Rudolf Valentino and Mae West, among many. He graduated from the Art Institute of Chicago in 1929. He studied at Ecole des Beaux-Arts in France and the Kunstgewerbe Schule in Vienna. The European schools specialized in mural painting, and in the 1930s Duren was known as a muralist. Examples of his later murals can be seen in the Brownville, NE Post Office and the Loup Public Power building in Columbus, NE.

Duren served as an instructor at the Cleveland Institute of Art from 1930 to 1941 and also taught at the Art Institute of Chicago and Case Western Reserve University in Cleveland. Among his projects, Duren designed sets for an opera company in Cleveland, as well as the sets and costumes for a marionette production of Pyr Gynt at the New York World's Fair (1939–40). Duren's career and reputation reached a zenith in 1944 when one of his paintings, Picnic in the Park, was chosen for Portrait of America, an exhibition which opened at the Metropolitan Museum of Art in New York City and then toured to eight museums across the country.

In 1941 he had a showing at the Jocelyn Museum in Omaha, and some time later decided to move back to Shelby, NE, where he lived until his death. He and Dale Nichols were featured in a 1945 Time magazine article entitled “War in the Corn” that recounted a "dispute" between the two artists, when each held retrospective exhibitions of their works in their hometowns. In 1950, Terence Duren did a series of illustrations for Lucius Beebe's book “The American West,” basing the images on the Omaha brothels and their inhabitants. He was a prolific illustrator whose work regularly appeared on the cover of the "Magazine of the Midlands", the Sunday supplement of the Omaha World-Herald. He was an ardent supporter of the Brownsville Historical Society and its effort to restore Brownsville. He was said to have produced "at least" 3,000 paintings. He died September 28, 1968, in Columbus, Nebraska.
