= Gil Savery =

American journalist (1917–2018)

- Born: October 10, 1917; Shelby, Nebraska, United States
- Died: November 2, 2018 (aged 101); Lincoln, Nebraska, United States
- Occupation: Journalist

Gilbert M. Savery (October 10, 1917 – November 2, 2018) was an American journalist. He worked for the Lincoln Journal Star from 1941 to 1985. Savery won the Pulitzer Prize in 1949 for his public service efforts.

== Early life ==
Gil Savery was born on October 10, 1917, at Shelby, Nebraska, United States and was raised in Lincoln, Nebraska. Savery enrolled at the University of Nebraska after he graduated from Lincoln High School.

== Career ==
Savery began his career and worked as a police reporter in 1941. Savery retired in 1985 as managing editor of the Lincoln Evening Journal. He was appointed into the Nebraska Journalism Hall of Fame in 2005 and received the highest honor available from the Nebraska Press Association — the Master Editor-Publisher Award — in 2010.

== Death ==
Savery died on November 2, 2018, in Lincoln, Nebraska.
