= Walt's Puffer II =

Walt's Puffer II is an early American Altered drag racing car, built in Inkster, Michigan.

== History ==
Walt’s Puffer II is a FIAT Topolino powered by a fuel injected 392 hemi, driven by Walt Knoch, Jr.

Construction of the car began in 1959. Using a 1939 Fiat body, it was built by Walt Knoch Sr., and a family friend, for Walt Jr. It originally had a Latham supercharger. It debuted at Detroit Dragway. It routinely turned in passes with 10 second e.t.s and speeds of 150 mph (240 km/h).

Knoch Jr. approached Ed Iskendarian and Stuart Hilborn for equipment to improve the 392's performance. After switching to Hilborn injection, Knoch set an A/Altered record pass at the 1959 Nationals, with a trap speed of 138.67 mph (223.17 km/h).

The car lost the Altereds title at the 1960 U.S. Nationals to the Oldsmobile-powered Ratican-Jackson-Stearns Fiat.

In 1961, the car's top was chopped, and it was dubbed Walt's Puffer II. It routinely turned in passes with 10 second e.t.s and speeds of 150 mph (240 km/h). It again lost to the Ratican-Jackson-Stearns Topolino at the 1961 Nationals.

The next year, the car won A/Altered at the NHRA U.S. Nationals, and only failed to face the Knochs' other car, the A/Roadster Walt's Puffer Too, for Junior Eliminator due to rain. When NHRA realigned divisions in 1963, it required Knoch to change the car's number to 385. He refused, and Wally Parks and Ed Eaton banned him. The car would not run again.

Walt's Puffer II was taken out of storage in 1999 and given a complete restoration by Knoch and Jerry Dotson.

== In popular culture ==
AMT's Double Dragster model kit, a Chrysler-powered Topolino, was issued with the number 285 on the door, the number Walt's Puffer II wore.

== Sources ==
- Genat, Robert. "1939 Fiat Coupe Altered", written 21 April 21, 2010, at Hot Rod Magazine online. Retrieved May 22, 2017.
