= Willie Borsch =

American drag racer (1930–1991)

- Nationality: American
- Born: February 19, 1930
- Died: October 1, 1991 (aged 61)

Altered

Awards
- International Motorsports Hall of Fame

Willie Borsch (February 19, 1930 – October 1, 1991), nicknamed "Wild Willie", was an American AA/FA and funny car drag racer.

== History ==
Borsch started racing in Altereds in 1960 with Winged Express, built by Borsch and partner Al "Mousie" Marcellus, assisted by Howard Johansen (of Howard's Cams), Don Reynolds, Phil Johnson, Dale Young, and Jerry Hyatt. The car's 392 hemi was built by Jim Harrell (of Jim's Auto Parts).

Borsch raced Winged Express for ten years, winning AA/FA (supercharged A-category Fuel Altered) at the NHRA Winternationals in 1967 and 1968. Since AA/FA was not recognized as a class by the National Hot Rod Association (NHRA) until 1967, Borsch was never credited with a national title.

On 28 September 1967 at Irwindale, Borsch turned in the first 200 mph (320 km/h) pass in an Altered, at 7.91 seconds and 200.44 mph (322.58 km/h).

Borsch qualified for the 1968 NHRA Winternationals, a 32-car field in Top Fuel, setting an AA/FA record elapsed time of 7.29 seconds. The rest of the field refused to race him, for fear of the ill-handling Altered. It turned out they were right: in round one of Super Eliminator, Borsch went from guardrail to centerline in a wild ride, which was photographed by Bob McClurg; it "became one of the most famous drag racing photos of all time."

After getting a deal with model kit maker Revell for royalties, Borsch took the wheel of the new Wild Man Dodge Charger funny car. Because he had become famous for driving Winged Express one-handed, using his other arm to brace himself against the body of the car, he created a dummy arm and attached it to the left window of the new funny car. This was included as a feature of the Revell kit. The Revell deal, and the partnership with Marcellus, fell apart after the independent-minded Borsch refused to wear a sponsor teeshirt for a publicity event.

Borsch died in October 1991 at age 61.

Borsch was named to Car Craft magazine's All-Star Drag Racing team six years in a row, starting in 1967. He was inducted into the International Drag Racing Hall of Fame in 1992. He was also rated as one of NHRA's 50 greatest drivers.
