= Lions Drag Strip =

Former raceway in Wilmington, Los Angeles, California

- Location: Wilmington, Los Angeles, California, U.S.
- Coordinates: 33.822654°N 118.225658°W
- Operator: Lions Clubs International
- Opened: 1955
- Closed: December 2, 1972
- Major events: American Hot Rod Association drag races
- Length: 0.25 mi (0.40 km)

Lions Drag Strip was an American raceway in the Wilmington district of Los Angeles, California, adjacent to Long Beach that existed from 1955 to 1972. The track was named after its sponsors, Lions Clubs International, and featured many races sanctioned by the American Hot Rod Association (AHRA).

As the area surrounding the track grew more densely populated, government officials received an increasing number of noise complaints. Subsequently, efforts were made to deny the track operators' continued use of the facility. The track was opened with a 30-day notice clause that could be enforced at any time, and on November 2, 1972, that notice was given. After the last races took place on December 2, 1972, the track was torn down by the Los Angeles Harbor Department to make space for overseas shipping cargo containers, which still stand at 223rd Street & Alameda Street in Wilmington, CA.

The track location remained abandoned for over 10 years until it was developed into the mega container facility by the L.A. Harbor Commission. The 1971/72 noise issue was then, and remains, seen by many local fans as a political ruse to close the track, although this cannot be substantiated. This same scenario has been repeated across the country as residential areas develop around older racing facilities.

== Museum ==
The Lions Automobilia Foundation & Museum is in Rancho Dominguez, near the original strip site. The museum holds about 80 American vehicles and period memorabilia.

An adjacent hall, the Lions Drag Strip Museum, opened in June 2019. It is organized into three eras: 1955–62, 1962–67, and 1967–72. Its collection includes roughly 30 vehicles that raced at Lions, along with period-accurate recreations, among them Funny Cars, front-engined dragsters, and Fuel Altered machines. It includes murals by motorsport artist Kenny Youngblood and a recreation of the starting line staged with hot rods.

Racing drivers such as Art Chrisman, Don Prudhomme, and Mickey Thompson are profiled.

== In popular culture ==
- The television series The Munsters filmed most of the episode "Hot Rod Herman" (aired on May 27, 1965) at Lions Drag Strip.
- The track announcer for many races in the late 1960s and early 1970s was broadcast personality and motorsports announcer Larry Huffman, whose frenetic announcing style was later spoofed by countless stand-up comedians.
- The television series MadMen mentions the Lions Drag Strip in "The Mountain King" (Season 2, Episode 12).
- In Once Upon a Time in Hollywood, Brad Pitt's character, Cliff Booth, is seen wearing a Lions Drag Strip t-shirt.
- Lions Drag Strip was used in "Who Won", Season 4 Episode 22 of Adam-12 which premiered on March 1, 1972. In the episode, Malloy and Reed work with young hot rodders to get them off the streets. In a rare acting appearance, Dick Clark portrays Mr. Benson, the track's owner. Ironically, Adam-12 was produced with input from the Los Angeles Police Department and promoted as an effort to curb street racing in March 1972, only for the city of Los Angeles to close down the strip in December.
- In Sam Peckinpah's The Killer Elite, a poster for the December 1–2, 1972 'The Last Drag Race At The Beach' can be seen on the wall at 48:10. "The Beach" is the racers' nickname for Lions Drag Strip.
- The 1967 film It's a Bikini World contains some race scenes taking place at Lions Drag Strip.
