= Winged Express (Altered) =

Overview
- Production: 1960 (one made)

Body and chassis
- Class: Altered
- Body style: Front-engined dragster

Powertrain
- Engine: 392 hemi

Winged Express is a supercharged A Fuel Altered (AA/FA). On 28 September 1967, it was the first Altered to exceed 200 mph (320 km/h).

== History ==
Winged Express was built in 1960 by driver William "Wild Willie" Borsch and partner Al Marcellus, assisted by Howard Johansen (Howard's Cams), Don Reynolds, Phil Johnson, Dale Young, and Jerry Hyatt. The car's 392 hemi was built by Jim Harrell (of Jim's Auto Parts).

The body, donated by Curt Hamilton, was the first Cal Automotive fiberglass 1923 Model T used on an Altered. When completed, the car had a simple hoop rollbar and narrow slicks, with the engine tilted upward to aid traction, and was missing the rollbar-mounted wing that later became its trademark.

The car was first entered in NHRA's A/Roadster class, at Riverside in 1960, where it set an A/R class record of 10.28 at 148.27 mph (238.62 km/h).

Borsch raced Winged Express for ten years, winning AA/FA at the NHRA Winternationals in 1967 and 1968.

Since AA/FA was not recognized as a class by NHRA until 1967, Winged Express never earned a national title.

On 28 September 1967 at Irwindale, Winged Express made the first 200 mph (320 km/h) pass by an Altered, at 7.91 seconds and 200.44 mph (322.58 km/h).

Winged Express qualified for the 1968 NHRA Winternationals, a 32-car field in Top Fuel, at an AA/FA record elapsed time of 7.29 seconds, only to have the rest of the field refuse to race Borsch, for fear of the ill-handling Altered. It turned out they were right: in Round One of Super Eliminator, Borsch went from guardrail to centerline, in a wild ride, captured, and made famous, by photographer Bob McClurg; it "became one of the most famous drag racing photos of all time".
