= Altered (drag racing) =

Former National Hot Rod Association

Altered is a former National Hot Rod Association (NHRA) drag racing class and a current drag racing chassis configuration that forms the basis of many classes of NHRA Competition Eliminator.

The altered is "[s]ometimes called the poor man's [d]ragster". While the emblematic altered is a short-wheelbase roadster with exposed engine and front frame rails, very similar to the earliest rail dragsters, altereds can be bodied cars also.

By definition, altereds were essentially stock gas, alcohol, or nitromethane-class cars with parts removed or changed, making them ineligible for the previous class, such as Keith Ferrell's Dogcatcher, a 1936 Willys sedan delivery; built as a gasser, Ferrell deliberately left something off to run it in B/Altered.

== History ==
The Altered category originated "for cars with moderate changes", according to the rulebook. It developed from out of the Hot Roadster, Fuel Coupé, and Fuel Sedan categories. In 1956, it was divided in three classes by weight break: A (up to 6.59 lb/cu in (182 kg/L)), B (6.6–8.59 lb/cu in (183–238 kg/L)), and C (8.6 lb/cu in (240 kg/L) and up). Rules allowed moving the engine back up to 25% of the wheelbase, as well as chopping and channeling, which were prohibited in gassers. The class had few limits or requirements. One of the pioneers was Walt's Puffer II, an unsupercharged A/Altered Fiat Topolino powered by a 392 hemi, driven by Walt Knoch.

Of the early altereds, the #554 A Fuel Coupé (A/FC), a '34 five-window, was "[u]ndoubtedly the most famous". It was built in the middle 1950s and (campaigned by Mooneyham and Johnson, driven by "Jungle Larry" Faust) turned in a best pass of 133.60 mph (215.01 km/h) with full fenders in Street Coupé. As a hiboy, at Bakersfield in 1960, that went up to 148.27 mph (238.62 km/h); the next month, it was the first altered to exceed 150 mph (240 km/h), with a trap speed of 152.02 mph (244.65 km/h). That rose again in 1961, to 165.13 mph (265.75 km/h), and by the time the car was retired, it had a best pass of 8.98 at 170.00 mph (273.59 km/h). The #554 Coupé was powered by a supercharged 390 cu in (6.4 L) hemi (a 331 cu in (5.4 L) block) on between 40% and 75% nitro. It routinely filled the cockpit with smoke and burned rubber and clutch dust; track marshals once asked Faust if he needed help after exiting the smoking car, to which Faust casually replied, "Why? This thing does this all the time."

In 1957, NHRA banned nitro in all categories; the American Hot Rod Association (AHRA) still allowed it, and Fuel Dragsters (FD), Hot Roadsters (HR), and Fuel Coupés (FC), in the days before Funny Car, went there instead: it would be Drag News and their Standard 1320 record which christened them Fuel Altereds. AHRA grouped coupés and roasters together, unlike NHRA, under Hot Car Eliminator (HCE). Independent drag strips, not NHRA sanctioned, offered venues for the fuel racers. Smokers Car Club hosted the first U.S. Fuel and Gas Championship at Famoso Raceway in March 1959. Bob Hansen won Top Fuel Eliminator (TFE) in his A/HR, with a speed of 136 mph (219 km/h).

Early in the 1960s, as supercharging proliferated, NHRA added AA/A, BB/A, and CC/A. In 1956, the A/A class record holder, "Jazzy Jim" Nelson's '47 Topolino, was so quick, it would face dragsters in Top Eliminator at the end of meet.

Supercharged A fuel altereds, or AA/FAs, are exemplified by the famous Pure Heaven, Pure Hell, and Rat Trap.

Winged Express, piloted by "Wild Willie" Borsch, is "arguably is the most famous fuel altered of all time". The car was built for AA/A in 1961 by Phil Johnson, and converted to AA/FA specification in 1963. It continued to race into 1970.

Lynn and Dave Hough, with driver Ed Moore, from San Bernardino, California, built Nanook I in the 1960s, an unusual long-wheelbase altered, bodied as a 1929 Model A, powered by a 455 cu in (7.46 L) Oldsmobile. They were given a blown hemi by Charlie Brent (after he wrecked his AA/FD), and built Nanook II around it, enabling the car to exceed 200 mph (320 km/h) at Orange County International Raceway The car was turned into a jigsaw puzzle, now "highly collectible" among drag racing fans, by Hallmark Cards. In 1975, the Houghs made an arrangement with the Super Shops retail chain in Southern California to build Nanook 4, with a '23 T body over a Norm Porter chassis and Ed Pink-built engine. It "became one of the quickest Fuel Altereds in history", turning in a 6.17 pass at 216.34 mph (348.17 km/h), and then one of the most famous ever, when Super Shops held a raffle at the end of the 1977 season and gave the car away. After the giveaway, the Houghs moved up to Funny Car for a short time, before retiring. They returned in 2001 with Nanook 6, a perfect copy of their excellent AA/FA, Nanook 3.

Moore also drove the AA/FA The Mob, teamed with Phil Miller. The duo created several versions of the supercharged A fuel car, "and were a significant part of the West Coast Fuel Altered scene" in the early 1970s.

This led to an exclusive Fuel Altereds Nationals in Tucson, Arizona, in 1976, attended by the likes of Dave "Nasty" Benjamin and Jimmy West.

Dennis Geisler campaigned the Instant T fuellie, then moved up to Funny Car, driving for a number of owners before fielding his own car in 1978.

Based in Phoenix, Arizona, West ran the Chevrolet-powered Wild Wild West AA/FA; his brother, Johnny, ran a similar car in the middle 1970s.

Leon Fitzgerald and Jack Eskelson collaborated on a '48 Topolino altered, powered by an injected Chevrolet; they would later add a supercharger, leading to a best time of 9.55 at 154.90 mph (249.29 km/h).

Fitzgerald and Eskelson would be joined by R. T. Reed and Richard Rockman, at Fitzgeralds's Anaheim Speed Engineers shop, in producing their most famous creation, the AA/FA match racer Pure Heaven, starting in 1965. Fitzgerald would drive this car in dozens of meetings against Pure Hell, driven by Dale Emery (for car owner Rich Guasco). Pure Heaven would run in the high 7s, with a best speed of 168.53 mph (271.22 km/h), before being replaced by the 427 cu in (7.0 L) big-block Chevrolet-engined Pure Heaven II, in 1967. Pure Heaven II would run on opening day of the new Orange County Raceway (now OCIR) on 5 August that year.

There was crossover between classes. For instance, Dan Parker turned a Logghe ex-Funny Car chassis, with a fiberglass reproduction Bantam body, into a B/Econo Altered for racing in Competition Eliminator.

In an effort to tame notoriously bad handling, with cars frequently wheelstanding or sideways, engine-mounted wings were state of the art in the 1960s, appearing on, among others, Yellow Submarine, run by Hunter-Lewis-Perry; driven by Tim Perry, it turned in a best pass of 7.19 at 203 mph (327 km/h).

Altereds were highly popular in the 1960s and 1970s. Despite the popularity of Altereds, NHRA eliminated the Altered Eliminator category in 1972, and eventually moved them into the NHRA's Competition Eliminator category which features any number of cars. There are over 40 classes of Altereds and Street Rods today, all based on vehicle and engines. Currently, Altereds may start as sub-2000cc 4-cylinder engines such as the Formula F Ford Kent engine (AA or BB/AF and H/EA). At the 1977 Winternationals in Pomona, California, more than 75 altereds contested for the Competition Eliminator title. Among them was Ed Prout, who brought his A/Altered from Connecticut. Yet by 1977, they had begun to be supplanted by Funny Car and Pro Stock. As late as that, however, John Lingenfelter was racing a B/Econo Altered (rebodied from Bob Glidden's 1976 Pro Stock car) in Comp Eliminator. Richard Hartman, a crew chief for NHRA Funny Car driver Tim Wilkerson, rebodied a former Wilkerson Funny Car chassis into an Altered, reaching 4.92 seconds in the quarter-mile with a terminal velocity of 304.53 MPH. It is the fastest quarter-mile car currently in the NHRA, as Top Fuel and Funny Car both run only to 1,000 feet.

A number of altereds drivers retired when NHRA eliminated the class, while others, like Geisler, moved to Funny Car. Some continued to run nostalgia, exhibition, or Competition Eliminator cars, such as Benjamin, who is now an owner.

== Named cars ==
- Beaver Hunter, AA/FA, driven by Henry Harrison
- Climax, AA/FA, driven by Ray Higley
- High Heaven, AA/FA, driven by Cal Jackson
- Instant T, FA, driven by Dennis Geisler
- Lo Blow II, FA, driven by Tom Ferraro
- Magnificent 7, AA/FA, driven by Leroy Chadderton
- The Mob, AA/FA, driven by Ed Moore
- Nanook, AA/FA, driven by Ed Moore
- Pure Heaven, AA/FA, driven by Leon Fitzgerald
- Pure Hell, AA/FA, driven by Dale Emery
- Rat Trap, AA/FA, driven by Butch Pipins
- The Savage, AA/FA, driven by Lee Lebaron
- Walt's Puffer II, A/FA, driven by Walt Knoch, Jr.
- Wild Cherry, A/Econo Altered, driven by Daniel Cyr
- Wild Wild West, AA/FA, driven by Jimmy West
- Winged Express, AA/FA, driven by "Wild Willie" Borsch
- Yellow Submarine, AA/FA, driven by Tim Perry

== Sources ==
- McClurg, Bob. Diggers, Funnies, Gassers and Altereds: Drag Racing's Golden Age. North Branch, MN: CarTech Inc, 2013.
