= Barbara Hamilton (drag racer) =

American woman drag racer (1941–2020)

- Nationality: American
- Born: Barbara L. Hamilton; August 17, 1941 Cleveland, Ohio, U.S.
- Died: April 23, 2020 (aged 78)

Gas

Barbara L. Hamilton (later Advey; August 17, 1941 – April 23, 2020) was an American pioneering woman drag racer. In 1963, she was the first woman licensed by the National Hot Rod Association (NHRA) to race a supercharged gasser. Hamilton died at her residence on April 23, 2020, at the age of 78.
