= Paula Murphy =

American automobile driver (1928–2023)

Paula Murphy (June 16, 1928 – December 21, 2023) was an American automobile driver who was first and/or fastest in many speed endeavors. In 1975, she was described as "the fastest woman on wheels" by The New York Times.

== Biography ==
Murphy was born in Ohio on June 16, 1928, and moved to California in 1956.

As of 1975, Murphy had been "the only woman to have been allowed to drive an Indy car at speed on the track. That had been in 1963" in a Studebaker car with a Novi engine. Murphy was also "the first woman to drive a jet-engined car on the Salt Flats". Murphy was also the "first woman licensed to drive a nitromethane-fueled car" and the first woman to have a fuel funny car license from the National Hot Rod Association.

In the 1960s and 1970s, Murphy set numerous speed records, including a Mexico to Canada route, a New York to Los Angeles route, the women's land speed record, and the NASCAR women's speed record. She became part of the Motorsports Hall of Fame of America in 2017.

Murphy appeared as a guest on the December 1, 1963 episode of What's My Line?, introduced as "test car driver".

Murphy died on December 21, 2023, at the age of 95.
