= Hot Rod Magazine Championship Drag Races =

The Hot Rod Magazine Championship Drag Races were a series of drag racing events sponsored by Hot Rod Magazine between 1964 and 1969. It was considered "one of the most significant drag racing events" of that era.

== History ==
The races were held at Riverside Raceway in Riverside, California starting in 1964. The total prize value awarded was US$37,000, more than a National Hot Rod Association (NHRA) national event purse at the time, and included (at first) a brand new Ford Mustang. Hot Rod publisher Ray Brock and editor Bob Greene worked with NHRA to arrange a summer event that would not create a scheduling conflict.

Held over three days, and run under NHRA regulations, all the pro classes were hosted, including Top Fuel, Top Gas, and Top Alcohol, and including dragster, funny car, modified, and altered. At the insistence of Wally Parks, a full slate of Sportsman classes was also offered.

The 1964 winner in Top Stock Eliminator was Gas Ronda, in his 427 cu in (7,000 cc)-powered Thunderbolt, taking home a Plymouth Barracuda as part of the prize package.

In 1965, the championship first hosted A/FX (Factory Experimental) cars (which later evolved into funny cars). That year, in TF/D (Top Fuel Dragster), Don Prudhomme and Tom McEwen each turned in 7-second passes at 211 mph (340 km/h), but ultimately, Top Fuel Eliminator (TFE) went to Jim Warren. That year's racing was also the subject of a film produced by Hot Rod, "The Hot Rod Story—Drag Racing", narrated by Dick Enberg.

At the 1966 championship, McEwen would win the Top Fuel title, while Mike Snively did (in Roland Leong's Hawaiian, with a 7.07 second pass at 221.66 mph (356.73 km/h)) in 1967. In 1968, it went to Steve Carbone in the Atlas Oil Tool Special. The final year the event was held, Larry Dixon, Sr. won TFE in Rattler (sponsored by Howard Cams).

== Sources ==
- Taylor, Thom. Untitled item in Hot Rod Magazine, February 2017, p. 11.
