= Don Garlits Museum of Drag Racing =

Automobile museum in Ocala, Florida

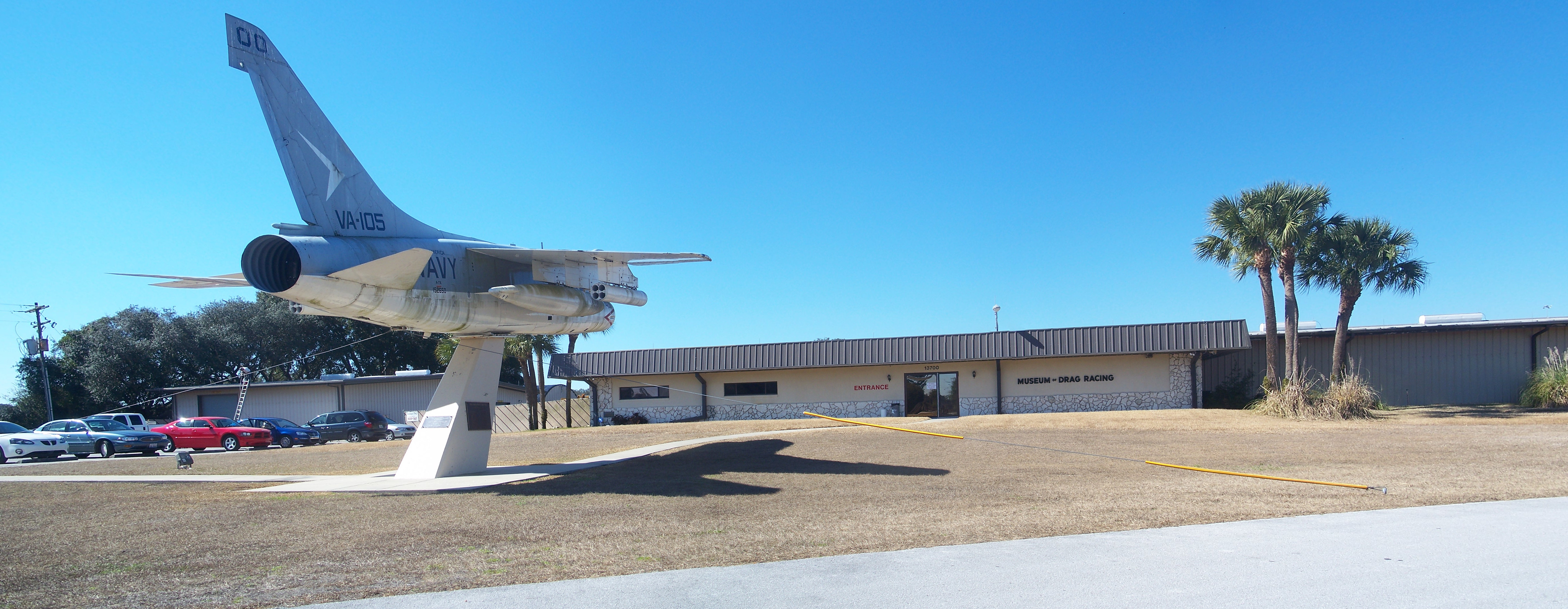

- Location within Florida Location within the United States
- Established: 1984; 42 years ago
- Location: 13700 SW 16th Ave; Ocala, Florida
- Coordinates: 29.021841°N 82.15287°W
- Type: Automobile museum
- Website: garlits.com

The Don Garlits Museum of Drag Racing is an American automobile museum in Ocala, Florida. Opened in 1984 by Don Garlits, it chronicles the history of the sport of drag racing. Some 90 racing cars can be seen in the Drag Race building, while a further 50 vehicles are in the Antique Car building. Many of the Garlits "Swamp Rat" cars are on display, along with cars and memorabilia associated with other figures in the sport. Two of Dean Moon's cars, the Mooneyes gas dragster and the Moonbeam sports car, are also shown.

== International Drag Racing Hall of Fame ==
The museum is home to the International Drag Racing Hall of Fame. Inductees are selected annually by a committee of veteran drag racing and performance industry figures and recognized at a ceremony held in Gainesville, Florida, in conjunction with the NHRA Gatornationals. Inductees include Art Arfons, Sydney Allard, Zora Arkus-Duntov, Ray Godman, Raymond Beadle, Shirley Muldowney, Kenny Bernstein, Don Schumacher, and Connie Glen Swingle. The Hall of Fame also presents a Founder's Award, which was given to motorsports artist Kenny Youngblood in 2014.

== See also ==
- Don Garlits
- Wally Parks NHRA Motorsports Museum
- Petersen Automotive Museum
- International Motorsports Hall of Fame
- Motorsports Hall of Fame of America
- NASCAR Hall of Fame
