= Orange County International Raceway =

Former raceway in Irvine, California

Coordinates: 33.66200°N 117.74750°W

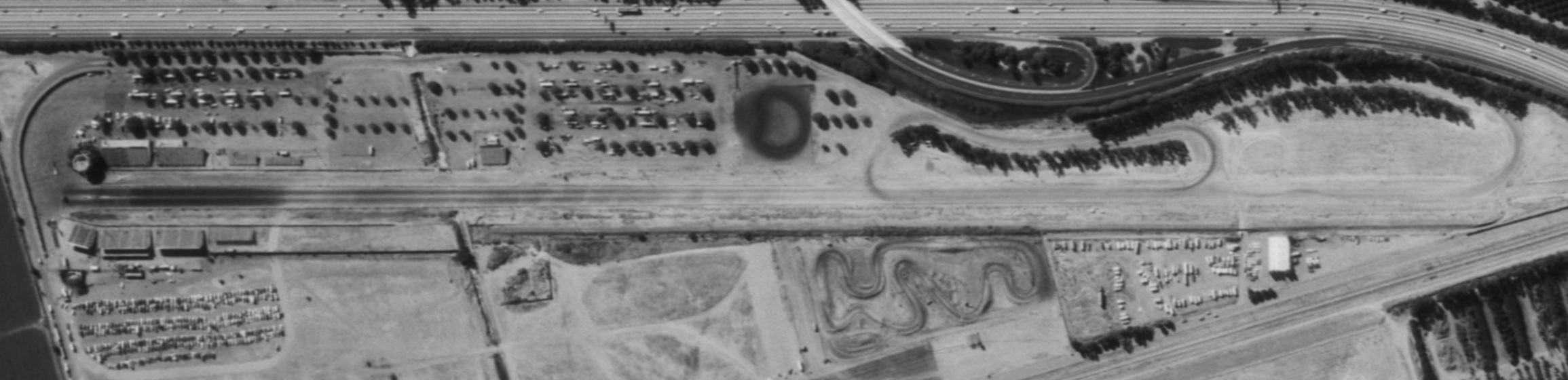
1980 aerial photo of the site adjacent to Interstate 5

Orange County International Raceway was a combined 1/4-mile US dragstrip and 2-mile road course, plus a motocross track, located in Irvine, California adjacent to the Interstate 5 (I-5) Santa Ana Freeway. Under a lease agreement with the Irvine Company, OCIR – as it was known in racing circles – was in operation from August 5, 1967, until its closure on October 30, 1983. The track was so named because its founders envisioned hosting sports car, motorcycle, midget, and stock car races in addition to National Hot Rod Association (NHRA) sanctioned drag racing events.

Known as 'The Supertrack', OCIR was designed to be the most modern of dragstrip facilities in the late 1960s, offering spectator comforts and conveniences never before available at a drag race facility in Southern California. The track construction included the extensive use of landscaping, permanent restrooms and concession stands, reserved seats with backs, drinking fountains installed throughout, the sport's first electric scoreboard and a 40-foot-high, four-story, glass-enclosed control tower and administration building.

OCIR was founded by Bill White, a member of the Irvine family; Larry Vaughan, whose father had been foreman of the Irvine Ranch; and Mike Jones, a local entrepreneur who subleased the dragstrip portion of OCIR’s operations. Vaughan, who also ran the Academy of Defensive Driving—a driving school primarily for police—managed the facility’s leasing for the Irvine Company.

The Bob Bondurant School of High Performance Driving was founded in 1968 at the track associated with Mike Sorokin.
