= AMC Hornet =

Compact car produced by American Motors Corporation (1970-1977)

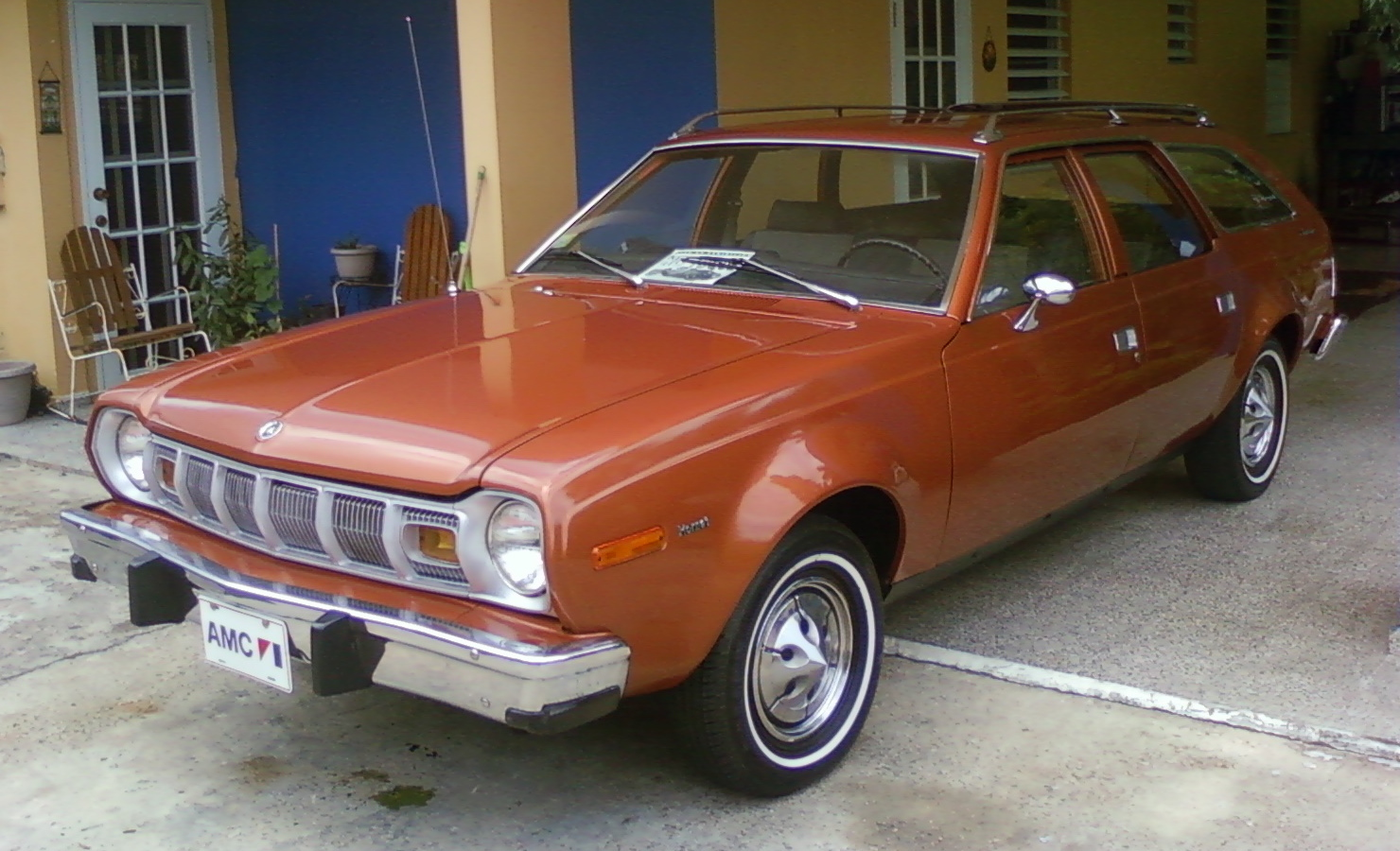
- 1976 AMC Hornet Sportabout wagon

Overview
- Manufacturer: American Motors Corporation (AMC)
- Also called: American Motors Hornet; Rambler Hornet (Australia and South Africa); VAM Rambler American (Mexico); VAM American (Mexico); Rambler SST (Costa Rica)
- Production: 1969–1977
- Model years: 1970–1977
- Assembly: United States: Kenosha, Wisconsin (Kenosha Engine); Canada: Brampton, Ontario (Brampton Assembly); Mexico: Mexico City (VAM); Australia: Port Melbourne (AMI); South Africa: Durban (Motor Assemblies and Toyota); Costa Rica: San José (Purdy Motors and Motorizada de Costa Rica)
- Designer: Dick Teague

Body and chassis
- Class: Compact; Muscle car (SC/360)
- Body style: 2-door sedan; 3-door hatchback; 4-door sedan; 4-door station wagon
- Layout: FR layout
- Platform: AMC's "junior cars"
- Related: AMC Gremlin; AMC Concord; AMC Spirit; AMC Eagle

Powertrain
- Engine: 199 cu in (3.3 L) I6; 232 cu in (3.8 L) I6; 250 cu in (4.1 L) GM I6 (South Africa); 252 cu in (4.1 L) VAM I6 (Mexico); 258 cu in (4.2 L) I6; 282 cu in (4.6 L) VAM I6 (Mexico); 304 cu in (5.0 L) V8; 360 cu in (5.9 L) V8
- Transmission: 3-speed "Shift-Command" automatic (1970–1971); 3-speed "Torque-Command" automatic (1972–1977); 3-speed manual; 4-speed manual

Dimensions
- Wheelbase: 108 in (2,743 mm)
- Length: 179.3 in (4,554 mm) (1970–1972); 185.8 in (4,719 mm) (1973–1977)
- Width: 70.6 in (1,793 mm)

Chronology
- Predecessor: Rambler American
- Successor: AMC Concord

The AMC Hornet is a compact automobile manufactured and marketed by American Motors Corporation (AMC) from the 1970 through 1977 model years, in two- and four-door sedan, station wagon, and hatchback coupe configurations. The Hornet replaced the compact Rambler American line, marking the end of the Rambler marque in the United States and Canadian markets.

The Hornet became significant for AMC in not only being a top seller during its production, but also a car platform serving the company in varying forms through the 1988 model year. Introduced in late 1969, AMC quickly earned a high rate of return for its development investment for the Hornet. The platform became the basis for AMC's subcompact Gremlin, luxury compact Concord, liftback and sedan Spirit, and the innovative all-wheel drive AMC Eagle. Its design would also outlast domestic competitors' compact platforms, including the Chevrolet Nova, Ford Maverick, and Plymouth Valiant.

The AMC Hornet also served as an experimental platform for alternative fuel and other automotive technologies. Hornets were campaigned at various motorsports events with some corporate support. A hatchback model also starred in an exceptional stunt jump in the 1974 James Bond film The Man with the Golden Gun.

Hornets were marketed in foreign markets and were assembled under license agreements between AMC and local manufacturers—for example, with Vehículos Automotores Mexicanos (VAM), Australian Motor Industries (AMI), and Toyota S.A. Ltd. in South Africa.

== The "Hornet" name ==
Hudson Motor Car Company introduced the first Hornet in 1951 as a performance model featuring the automaker's new "H-145" engine. The automaker formed a stock car racing team centered on the car, and the "Fabulous Hudson Hornet" soon became famous for its wins and stock-car title sweeps between 1951 and 1954. Hornets "dominated stock car racing in the early-1950s, when stock car racers actually drove regular production stock cars." The Hudson Hornet car inspired Paul Newman's Doc Hudson movie character.

American Motors retained rights to the "Hornet" name during the Automobile Manufacturers Association (AMA) resolution on factory-supported racing from 1957 until 1962. This was initiated by the AMA to limit the auto industry's horsepower race and corporate sponsorship of racing to glamorize speed or performance. Thus, the Hornet was dormant from 1958 until 1969 when AMC introduced a new compact car line for the 1970 model year.

The Hornet name has since become steeped in history, not only for being a motorsport legend that was later immortalized in movies, but also because it was a "game changer" for AMC as the compact-size Hornet platform became the base for new market segments.

The rights to the "Hornet" nameplate were then transferred to Chrysler with the larger automaker's acquisition of AMC in 1987. The nameplate has been on several concept cars since then. The Hornet nameplate was reintroduced for the 2023 model year as a compact SUV marketed under the Dodge brand.

== AMC Hornet development ==
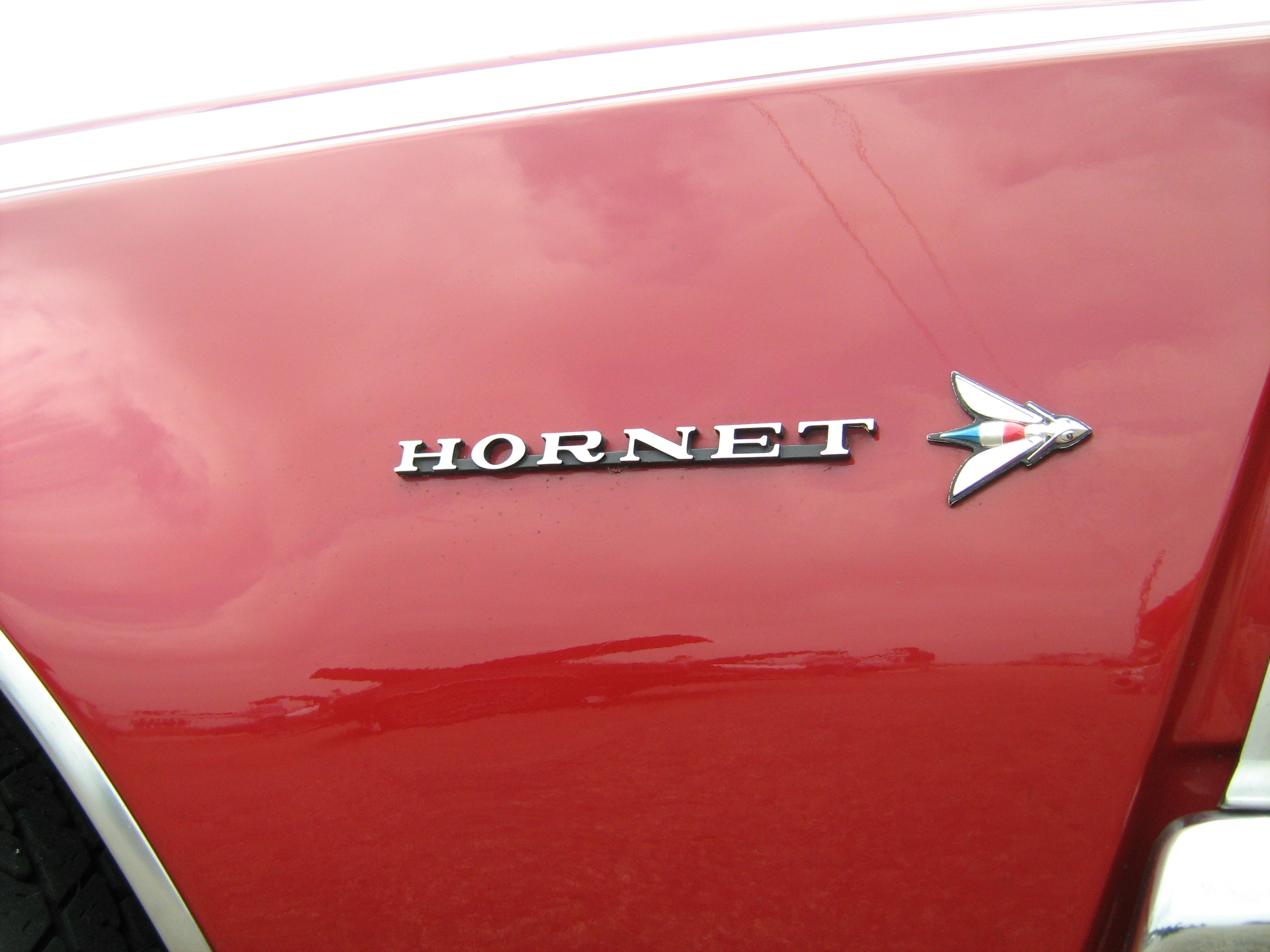
AMC Hornet badge

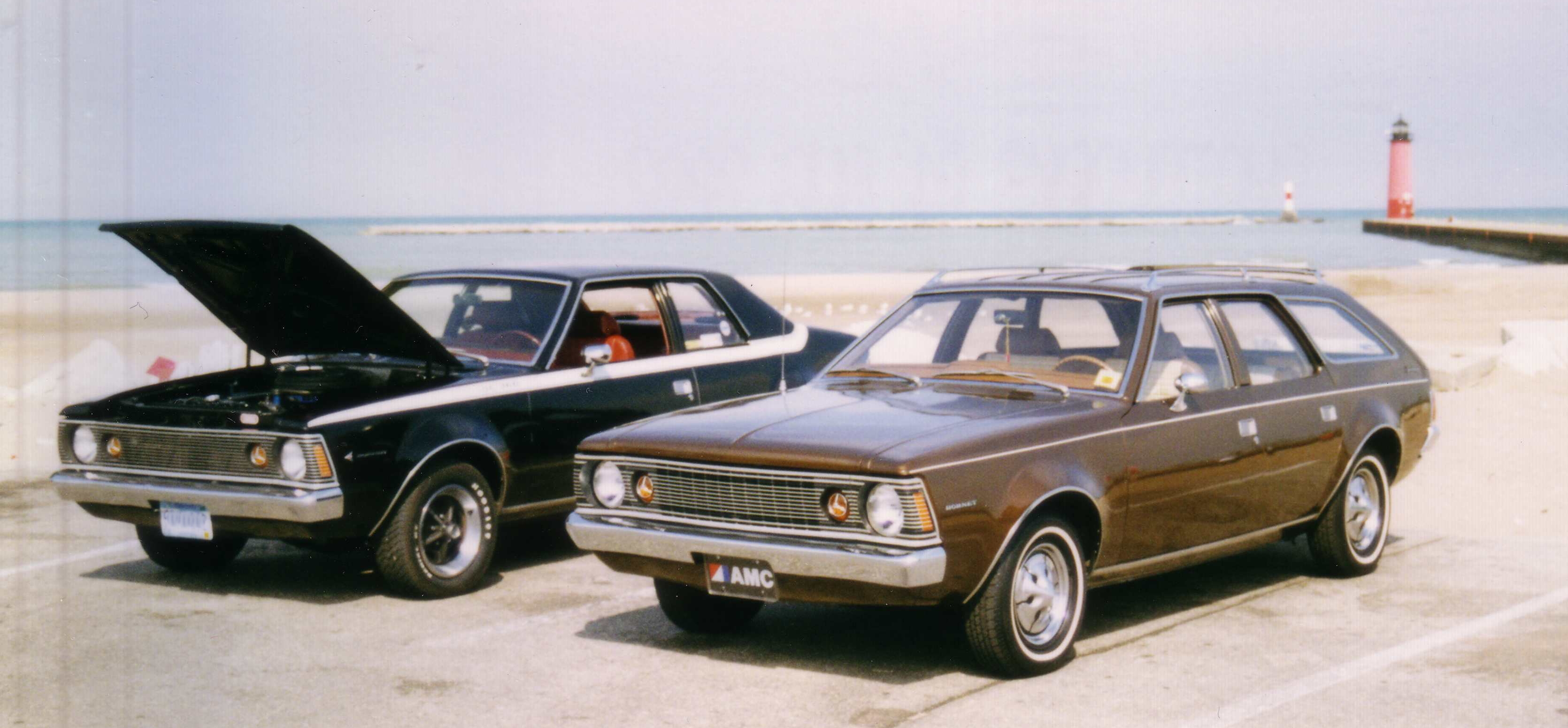
1971 SC/360 and 1972 Hornet Sportabout

=== Positioning ===
The AMC Hornet emerged as a pivotal vehicle in AMC's strategy, directly replacing the venerable Rambler American. The Hornet's styling was foreshadowed by a pair of 1966 show cars, the four-door AMC Cavalier and the two-door Vixen. These designs showed that "AMC's stylists had a very good grasp of the direction the industry as a whole would take as 1970 began." Introduced in 1969 for the 1970 model year, it became "a car that could hardly have hit the market more squarely." The objective of AMC was to target buyers who wanted economy in a car with style, performance, and "fun to drive." The Hornet, as well as the Ford Maverick, was considered a response by the domestic automakers to battle with the imports. The rising tide of imported cars had captured a significant portion of the U.S. market.

Development of the new model took AMC three years, a million person-hours, and US$40 million. The Hornet was an all-new design. An all-new robust front suspension with anti-brake dive was developed for AMC's large-sized "senior" 1970 models, and instead of developing lighter components for the new compact-size platform, the same parts were incorporated into the Hornet, demonstrating an engineering efficiency.

The chassis and sheet metal were entirely new, with the conventional front-engine rear-drive drivetrain carried over from the previous Rambler American. The Hornet's 108-inch (2,743 mm) wheelbase platform was 2 inches (51 mm) longer than its predecessor. The design incorporated AMC's numerous innovative features and groundbreaking ideas. The AMC Hornet was the first U.S.-made automobile to feature guardrail beam doors to protect occupants in the event of a side impact.

The compact-sized Hornet continued AMC's role as a "niche" marketer specializing in small cars. It became one of AMC's best sellers. The Hornet was the first car in a line of new models that AMC would introduce over the following three years.

The Hornet set the tone for what designer Dick Teague and chief executive officer Roy D. Chapin Jr. had had in mind for the company in the 1970s. The platform ultimately evolved into the innovative four-wheel-drive AMC Eagle, produced through 1988.

=== Pricing ===
With its manufacturer's suggested retail price (MSRP) of $1,994 for the base two-door model, the 1970 Hornet was a low-priced, economical small family car providing "cut-above interior appointments. The base version 1970 Ford Maverick was listed at $1 more while the Chevrolet Nova and Plymouth Duster were priced 10% higher. The Hornet and the Maverick were designed to stem the tide of imported cars that had captured 10% of the total U.S. market, with 80% of them retailing under $2,000. While domestic cars had generally grown larger, heavier, more fuel-consumptive, and more profitable through options, the rise of economical foreign vehicles highlighted a market segment where American offerings had largely abandoned the under-$2,000 price point. Of the original eleven compact car nameplates, only four still qualified as compact-sized by 1969, and only one, the Rambler American, was priced under $2,000.

The Hornet was initially available in a choice of two economical straight-six engines or a potent 304 cu in (5.0 L) V8. When equipped with the V8 engine, the Hornet was in the compact performance market segment (along with the competing 302 cu in (4.9 L) Ford Maverick, 327 cu in (5.4 L) Chevrolet Nova, and 340 cu in (5.6 L) Plymouth or Dodge models) for buyers who "wanted to drive something fun" without increasingly expensive to operate muscle cars.

The Hornet was offered as a two-door and four-door notchback sedan in its introductory year. The station wagon and two-door hardtop (no "B" pillar) body styles which had been available in the predecessor Rambler American line, were not carried over for the Hornet's initial launch.

=== Expanding the line ===
In April 1970, a mid-model year introduction used the Hornet as the basis for the 96-inch (2,438 mm) wheelbase AMC Gremlin, which utilized the front half of the two-door Hornet's body and a truncated rear section with a window hatchback.

A four-door station wagon variant named the "Sportabout" was added to the 1971 lineup. It featured a steeply raked hatchback rather than a conventional station wagon design with a rear window retracting into a drop-down tailgate. American Motors was careful not to describe the new body style as a traditional station wagon. Advertising emphasized that "it's not so much a station wagon as it is a sporty car with cargo space" and that the Sportabout is in a class by itself because it "combines fun with function."

A unique SC/360 model was added for the 1971 model year. Available only as a two-door sedan, it included AMC's 360 cu in (5.9 L) V8 engine as standard, making it a compact-sized muscle car. For the 1973 model year, a semi-fastback hatchback coupe with fold-down rear seats was also added to the lineup.

In 1973, a Levi's Jeans trim package was added based on the famous jeans manufacturer. The Levi's trim package was popular and was available for several years. The Hornet station wagon version was offered for two model years with a luxury trim package designed by Italian fashion designer Dr. Aldo Gucci. It is notable for being one of the first American cars to offer an upscale fashion "designer" trim level.

== Year-by-year changes ==
=== 1970 ===
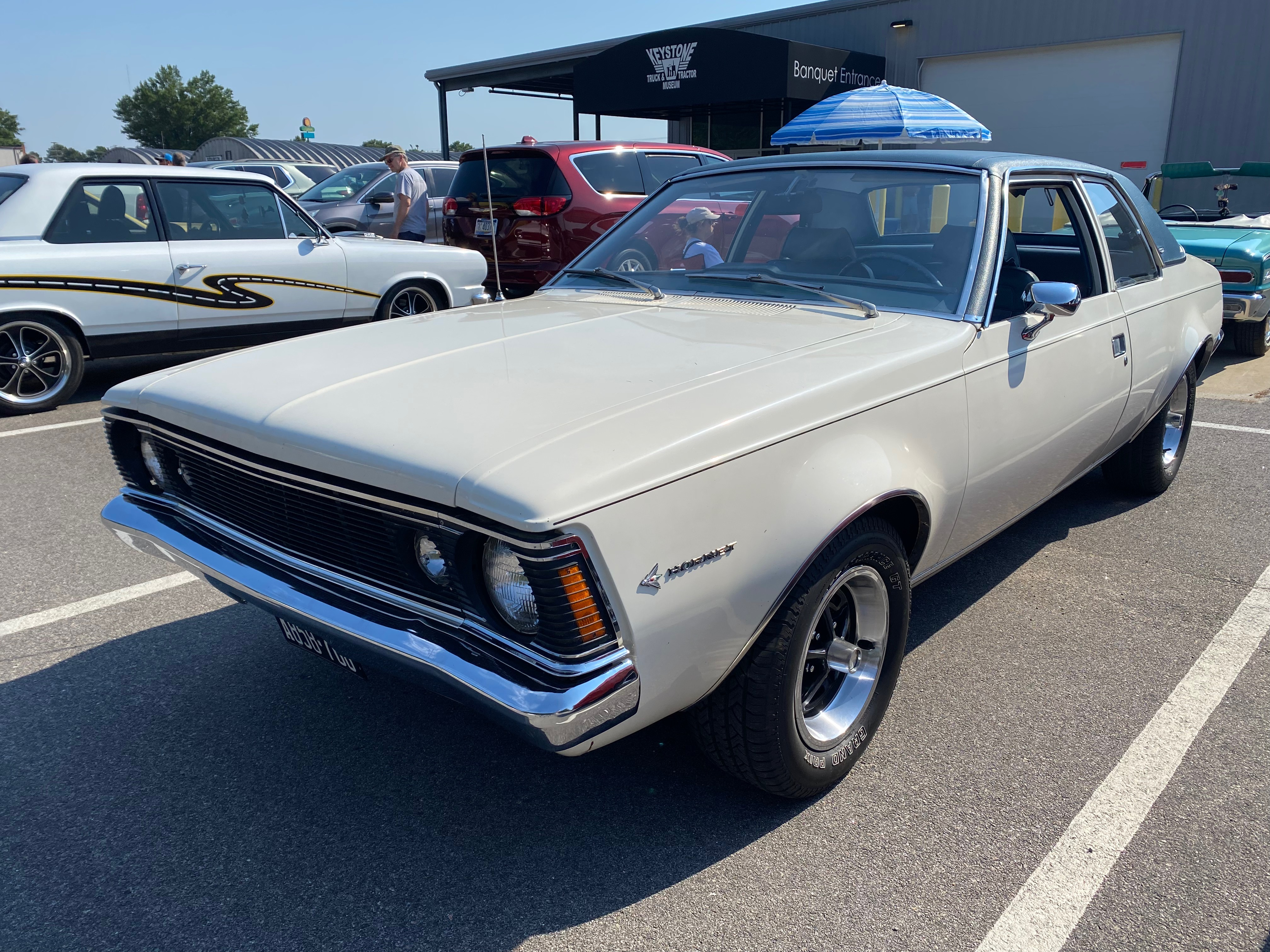
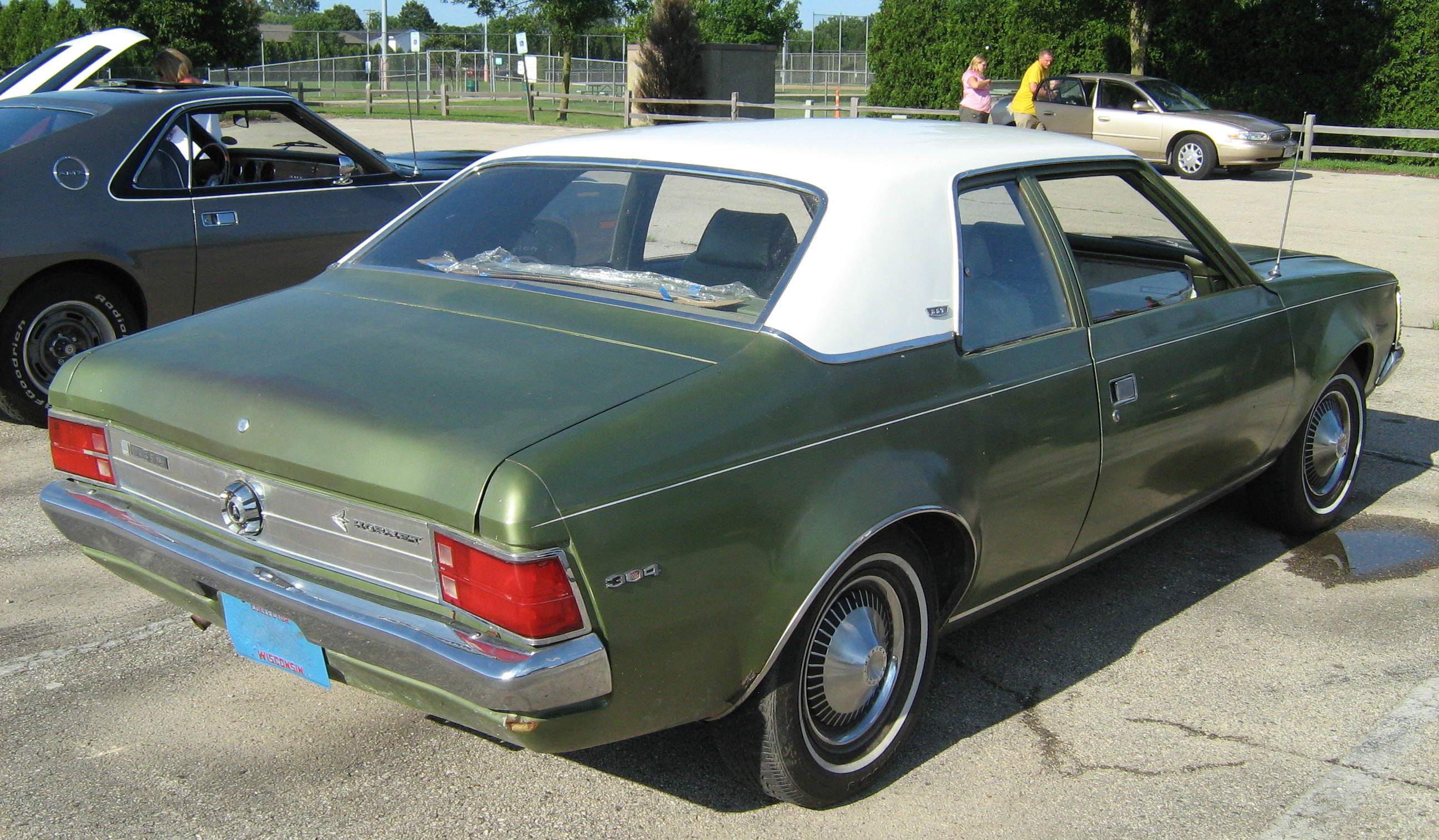
1970 Hornet SST model

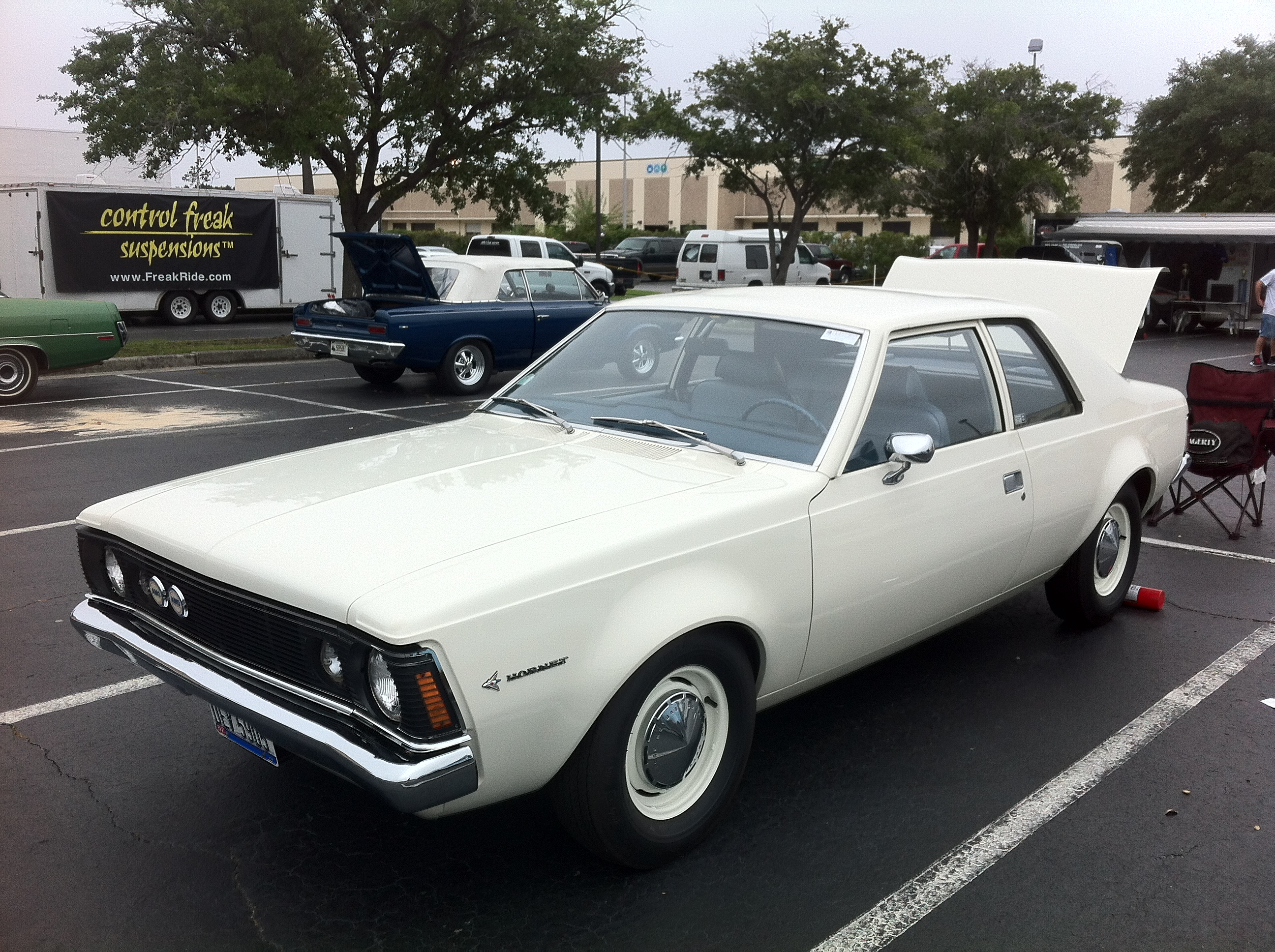
1970 Hornet base 2-door sedan

Introduced in September 1969, the first-year Hornets came in "base" and higher trim SST models, in two- and four-door sedan body styles. American Motors positioned the new line of sedans to be an American-designed small car that did not automatically stand for "cheap" by including features and conveniences that were optional to not available on competing brands, as well as making the Hornet wider on a longer wheelbase and with more body weight giving extra stability, increased ride comfort, better handling, interior room, trunk space, and enhanced security.

The Hornet was promoted as "the little rich car" with room for five passengers. The base model two-door sedan was $1,994, with the four-door an additional $78. The base Hornets "were nicely trimmed for the price" with standard armrests, ashtrays, interior lights, glove box, cigarette lighter, coat hooks, and an integrated dash ventilation system. The SST trim models were priced at $150 additional to the base two- or four-door versions and added a bright trim for the roof, wheel fender openings, rocker panel, and insert between the taillights, as well as a custom steering wheel, locking glove box, full-width under-dash parcel shelf, day/night rearview mirror, and functional items. The SST was available with two-tone paint, a black, white, or blue vinyl covered roof, as well as individually adjustable reclining front seats in upholstered in custom fabric with matching side trim and door panels.

The 199 cu in (3.3 L) straight-6 engine with a one-barrel carburetor rated at 128 hp (95 kW; 130 PS) at 4400 rpm and 182 lb⋅ft (247 N⋅m) of torque at 1600 rpm was standard on base trim models. The SST versions included the one-barrel 232 cu in (3.8 L) engine producing 145 hp (108 kW; 147 PS) at 4300 rpm and 215 lb⋅ft (292 N⋅m) of torque at 1600 rpm. A two-barrel version of this engine was optional on both models increasing output by 10 hp (7 kW; 10 PS) and 7 lb⋅ft (9.5 N⋅m). The standard transmission was the column-shifted three-speed manual with the one-barrel I6 engines. Optional was the three-speed automatic and required with the two-barrel 232 cu in (3.8 L).

Optional on SST models was the 304 cu in (5.0 L) two-barrel V8 engine rated at 210 hp (157 kW; 213 PS) at 4400 rpm and 305 lb⋅ft (414 N⋅m) of torque at 2800 rpm. The V8 option was only offered together with the automatic transmission and included a standard front suspension sway bar, larger 11-inch drum brakes, and optional power-assisted front disk brakes as well as up-sized fiberglass-belted tires that included C or D78x14 black or twin-stripe whitewalls, and D70x14 red lines.

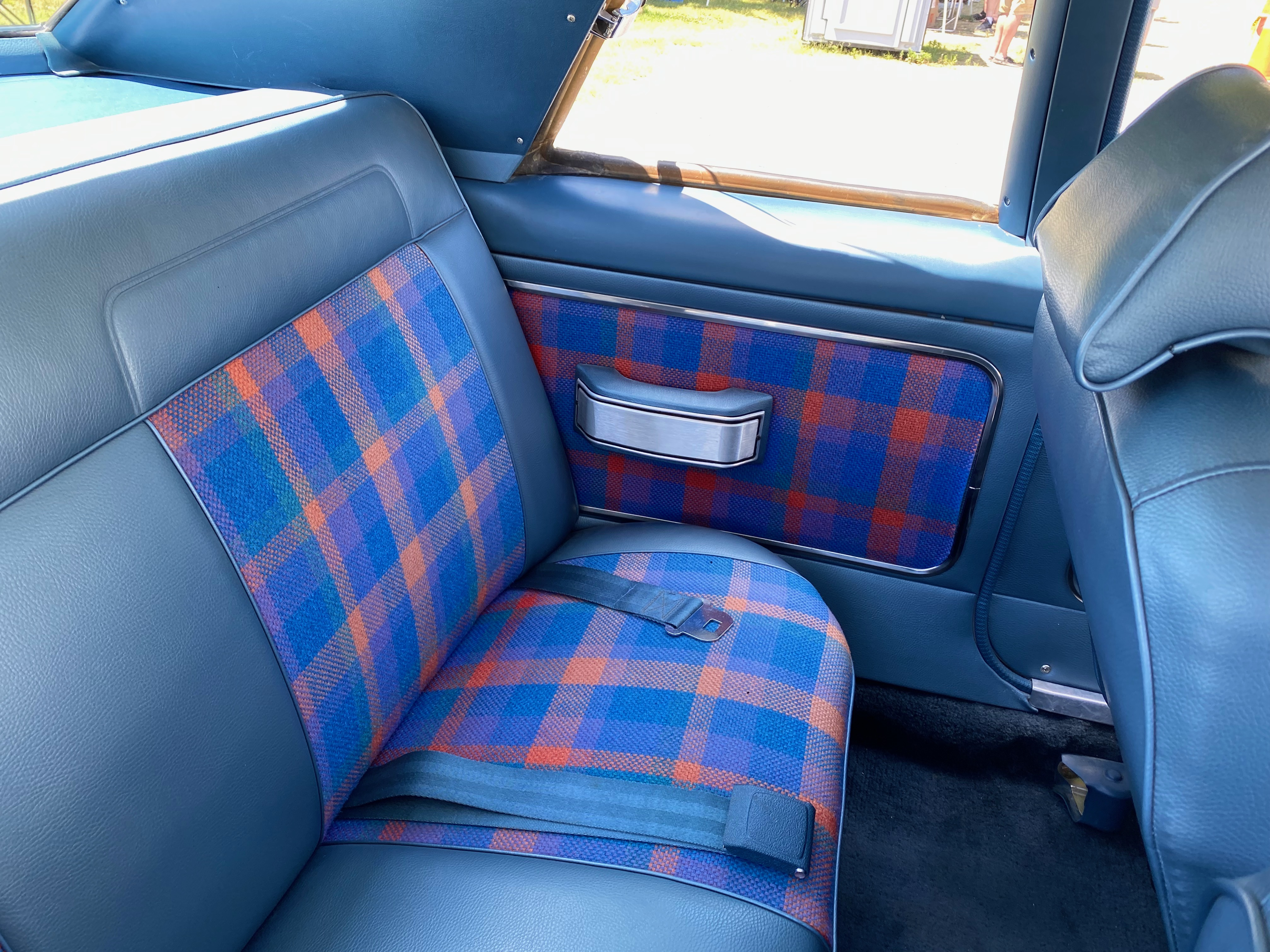
Interiors of 1970 Hornet SSTs featured "custom" fabric upholstery with matching side and door panels

The annual new car issue of Popular Science introduced the 1970 model by entitling its article: "Rambler is dead – long live the Hornet!" The authors not only compared the new Hornet with the outgoing Rambler American, but also with its primary competition, the Ford Maverick and finding the Hornet better to Ford's new model in several factors that are significant to consumers, as well as "certainly superior among economy cars" in ride-and-handling and "way ahead" in performance.

Popular Mechanics magazine road-tested an SST trim version with the V8 engine and automatic transmission and summarized the findings in the article's sub-title: "It has a lot of good things in a not-too-small package."

Popular Science magazine conducted a comparison road test of four of the lowest-priced U.S. cars (AMC Hornet, Ford Maverick, Plymouth Duster, and Chevrolet Nova), describing the 1970 Hornet as offering more interior and trunk room, excellent visibility in all directions, achieving the highest fuel economy, needed the optional disk brakes, and the authors concluded that it was the "practical family car ... better value than any of the others".

1970 production:

2-door base: 43,610
4-door base: 17,948
2-door SST: 19,748
4-door SST: 19,786

=== 1971 ===
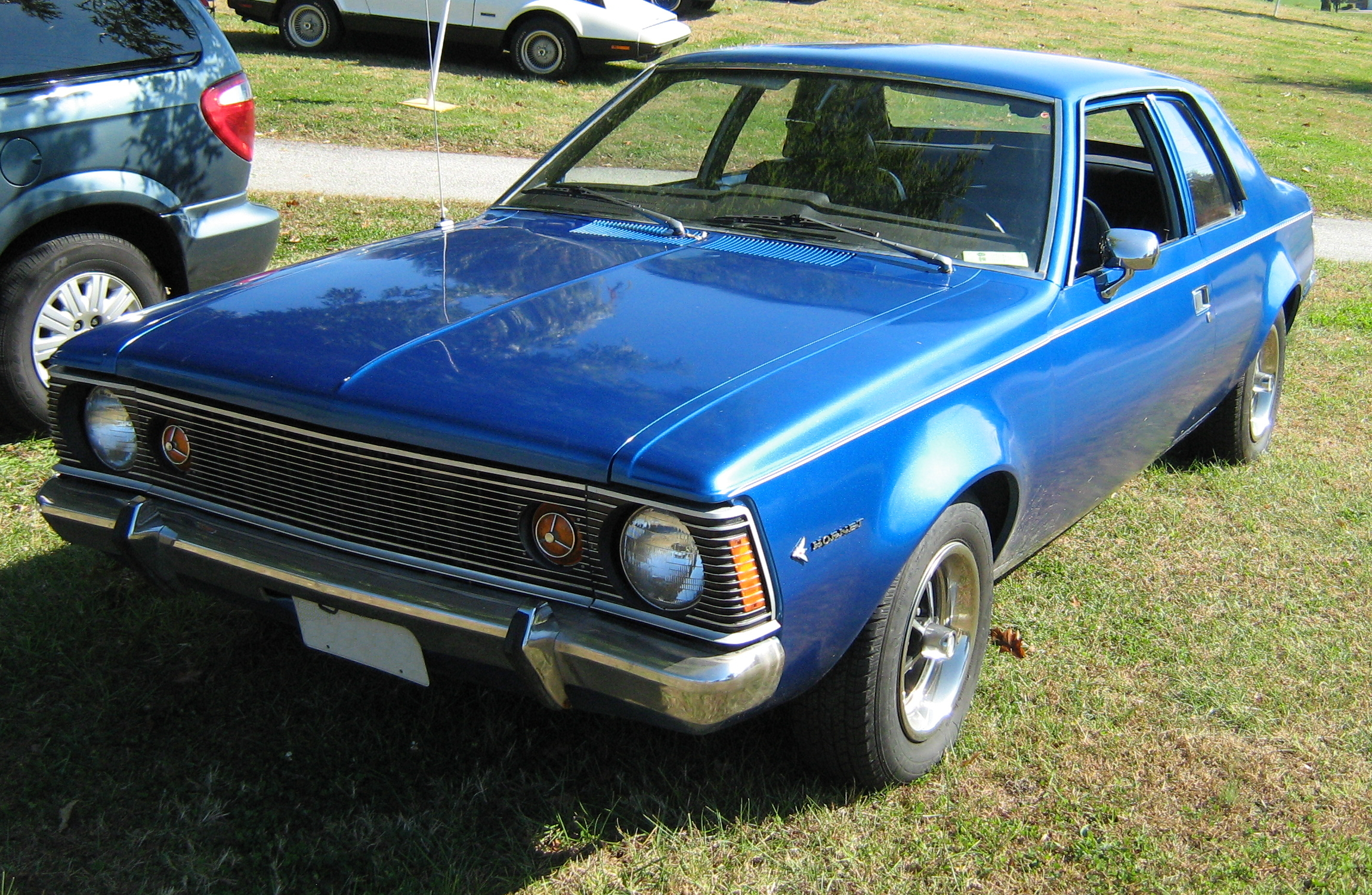
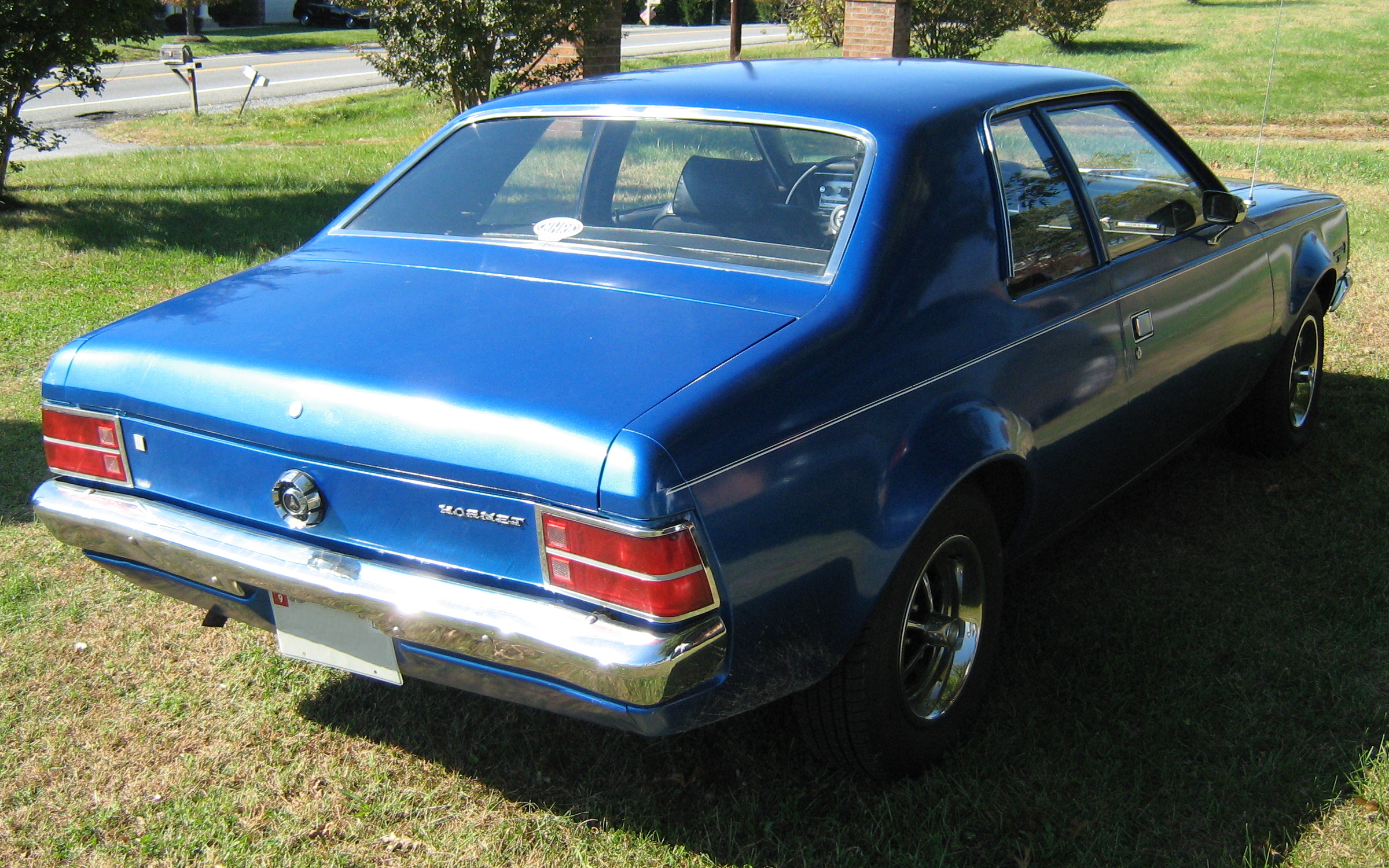
1971 Hornet "base" model

The 1971 model year was the introduction of the Sportabout, a four-door wagon using a steeply sloped back design with a single liftgate-type hatch. The styling was well-executed to appear muscular and purposeful while the liftgate-type station wagon appeared revolutionary in an era of traditional and upright rear tailgates. All featured a "Sportabout" emblem at the rear of the bodysides.

The two- and four-door sedans were carryovers. The 232 cu in (3.8 L) I6 engine became the standard across the range.

A marketing promotion in the Spring made available a new fabric folding sunroof on specially equipped Hornets, as well as on the Gremlin. The opening roof feature was included with the purchase of whitewall tires, custom wheel covers, pinstripes or rally stripes, a light group, and a special visibility group.

==== SC/360 ====
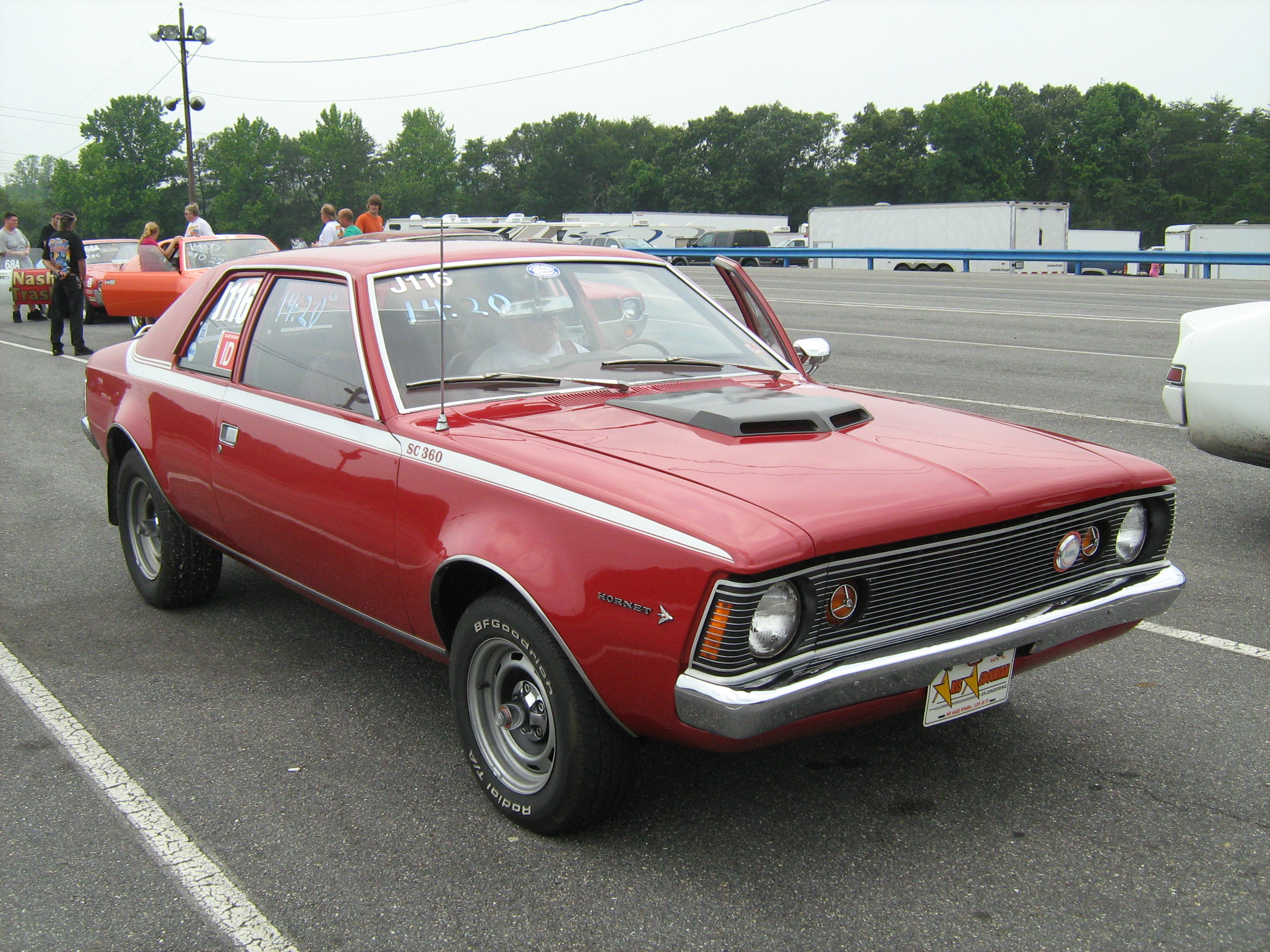
1971 AMC Hornet SC/360

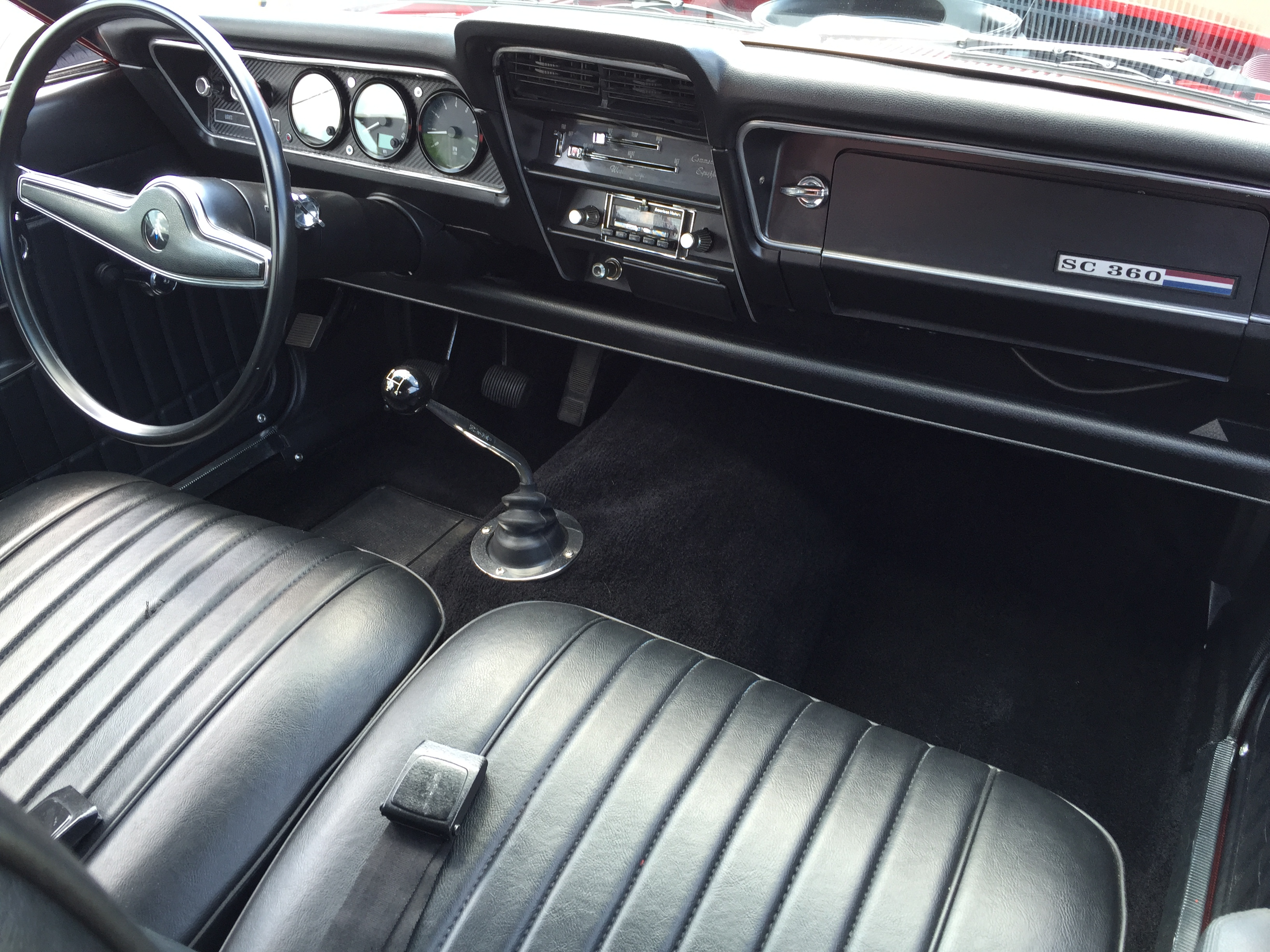
Interior of the 1971 AMC Hornet SC/360 compact muscle car

The SC/360 was added for the 1971 model year as a compact 2-door muscle car that was intended as a follow-up to the 1969 SC Rambler. The tire pressure sticker on the initial production of 1970 models hinted at the availability of the 360 V8 engine. The standard engine for the SC/360 was AMC's 360 cu in (5.9 L) V8. The SC/360 was distinguished by styled wheels, body striping, individual fully reclining front seats as well as other performance and appearance upgrades. In standard form, with a two-barrel carburetor, the 360 produced 245 hp (183 kW; 248 PS) (gross) and the car was priced at just US$2,663 (about $40 below the 1971 Plymouth Duster 340). This combination was offered by AMC to achieve a 12.5:1 weight-to-horsepower ratio for insurance rate calculations.

With the addition of the $199 "Go" package's four-barrel carburetor and ram-air induction, the SC's power increased to 285 hp (213 kW; 289 PS). Optional in place of the standard three-speed was a Hurst-shifted GM Borg-Warner Super T10 four-speed or an automatic transmission. Goodyear Polyglas D70x14 blackwall tires were standard, with upgrades including white lettered tires, a heavy-duty suspension package, and the Spicer "Twin-Grip" limited-slip differential with 3.54:1 or 3.90:1 gears.

Although the SC/360 could not compete with the holdover big-engined muscle cars, the SC combined respectable quickness (0 to 60 mph in 6.7 seconds) and the quarter mile (1320 feet, 402 m) dragstrip in 14.9 at 95 mph (153 km/h) with a taut suspension, big tires, and modest size; thus Motor Trend magazine described it as "just a plain gas to drive ... it handles like a dream." Hot Rod magazine ran the 1/4 mile an SC/360 with automatic transmission weighing 3,200 lb (1,451 kg) in 14.80 seconds at 94.63 mph in "bone-stock form" and predicted that high 13s could be achieved "with little more than a rejet and recurve of the carb and distributor." The authors also praised the car's handling and braking by summarizing: "Unbelievable. I think it's some great little car!" Car Craft magazine testers bolted on better tires, headers, and traction bars to run the 1/4 mile in 13.78 seconds at 101.92 mph (164 km/h).

The muscle car market segment reached the height of popularity in 1970, but the combination of rising fuel and insurance prices along with emerging emissions reductions meant the end of an era. American Motors originally planned to build as many as 10,000 of the cars, but high insurance premiums killed the SC/360 after a single year's production of just 784 examples. A total of 304 were built with the now-preferred combination of a four-speed manual transmission and a four-barrel carburetor.

The Sportabout version was the most popular model by far, outselling all other Hornet models combined in its debut year. For most of its production, it was the only American-made station wagon in its size class.

1971 production:

2-door base: 19,395
4-door base: 10,403
2-door SST: 8,600
4-door SST: 10,651
Wagon SST: 73,471
SC/360: 784

=== 1972 ===
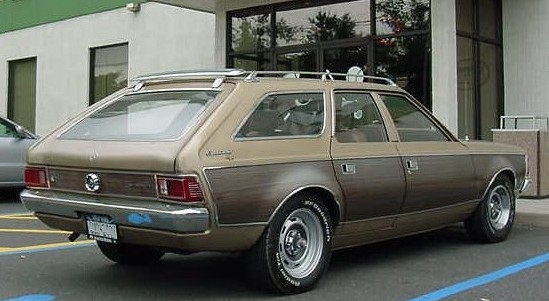
1972 Hornet Sportabout

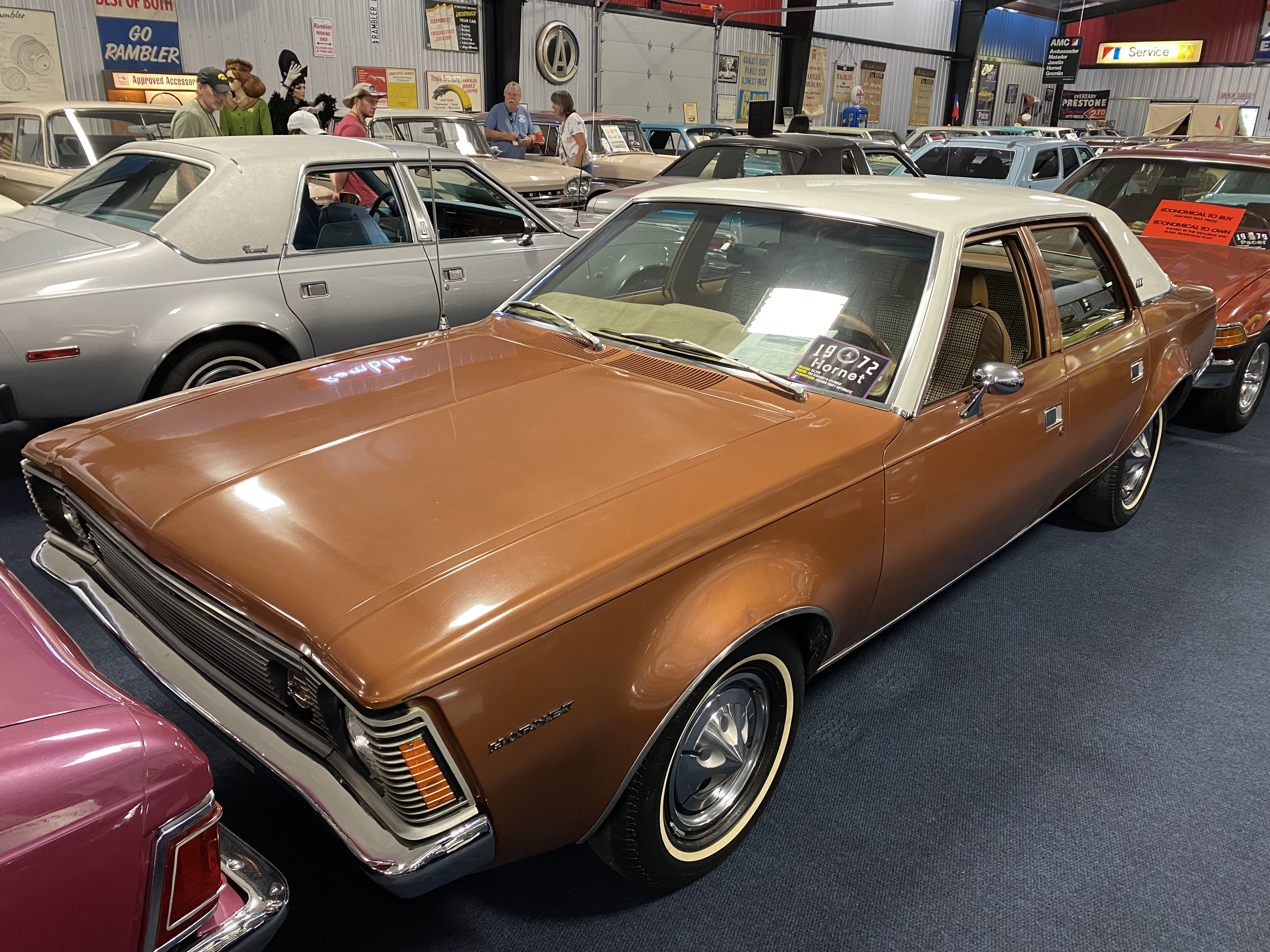
1972 Hornet 4-door sedan

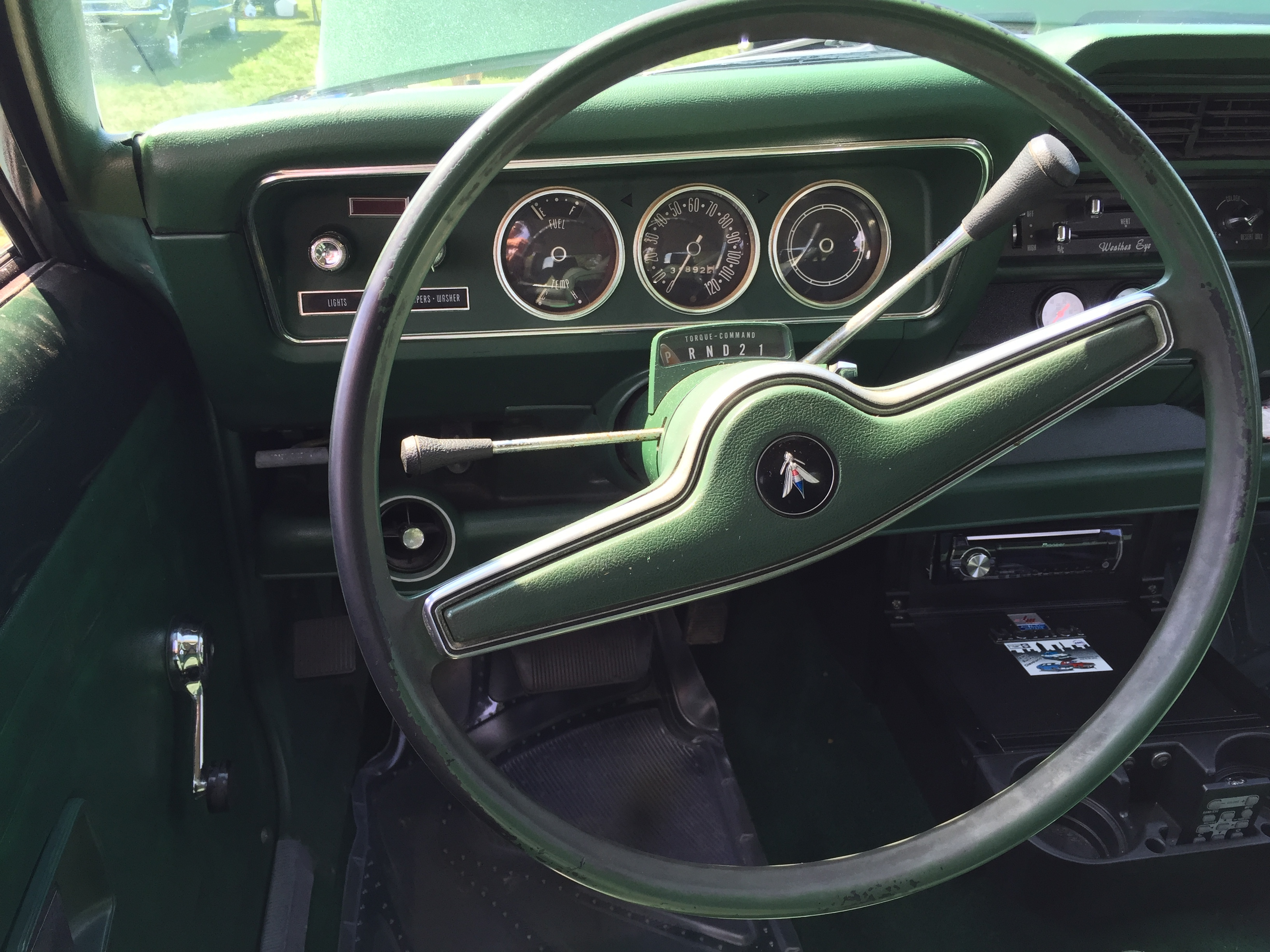
1972 Hornet interior

American Motors established a new focus on quality with the 1972 model year. The "Buyer Protection Plan", was the industry's innovative 12-month or 12,000-mile (19,312 km) comprehensive, bumper-to-bumper warranty. This was an industry-first that included providing a loaner car as well as trip-interruption protection, all at a time when most automakers offered only a limited six-month warranty on their new cars. During that time, "long-term accountability was something that automakers on any continent attempted to avoid."

The 1972 AMC Buyer Protection Plan was possible due to numerous mechanical upgrades to increase durability, as well as a focus on quality in sourcing and production. Production quality was increased as well as pre-delivery preparation by the dealer that includes "230 inspections and the road test each car ... to find any problems before the car is delivered, so the customer will not have to come back later."

American Motors promoted the 1972 Hornet as "a Tough Little Car". The automaker promised to repair anything wrong with the car (except for the tires), and owners were provided with a toll-free telephone number to the company as well as a free loaner car if a warranty repair took overnight.

To consolidate AMC's product offering, reduce production costs, and offer more value to consumers, the base models were dropped and all 1972 Hornets were designated as "SST" trim. The single SST version of the 2-door and 4-door sedans, as well as the Sportabout station wagon, offered more items standard than the previous year's base model at about the same price. Electric windshield wipers and washers replaced the standard vacuum-operated units. With no stripped-down basic models, all Hornets now came with comfort and convenience items that most consumers expected. For the first time, an AM/FM monaural radio was added to the options list.

Other changes included dropping the SC/360 compact muscle car, but the two-barrel version of the 360 cu in (5.9 L) remained optional in addition to the 304 cu in (5.0 L) V8 engine. For those desiring more performance, a four-barrel carburetor was a dealer-installed option on the 360 V8. Automatic transmissions were now the TorqueFlites sourced from Chrysler, and AMC called it the "Torque-Command".

New for the 1972 model year was the "X" package that attempted to replicate the success AMC had had with this trim option on the 1971 Gremlin. The Hornet X trim package was available on the two-door sedan and the new Sportabout. It could be ordered with any of the available I6 and V8 engines and included rally stripes, "X" emblems, a three-spoke sports steering wheel, and 14 x 6-inch slot-style steel road wheels with C78 x 14 Polyglas blackwall tires. A performance-oriented "Rallye" package was also introduced. It included among other items: special lower body stripes, a full-synchromesh three-speed manual gearbox with floor shift, bucket seats, handling package, front disc brakes, 20.1 quick-ratio manual steering box, and a sports steering wheel. It was possible to order both the Rallye and the X-package.

Motor Trend magazine tested a 304 cu in (5.0 L) V8 Hornet in 1972, measuring performance from 0 to 60 mph in 9 seconds flat and the 1/4-mile dragstrip in 16.8 seconds at 82 mph (132 km/h). These were virtually equal to the 350 cu in (5.7 L) V8 Chevrolet Nova that was tested in the same issue.

1972 production:

2-door SST: 27,122
4-door SST: 24,254
Wagon SST: 34,065 (Gucci version: 2,583)

==== Gucci Sportabout ====
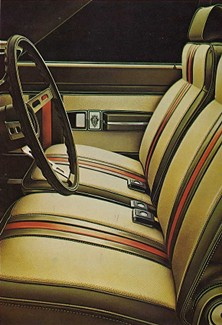
Gucci Sportabout interior

The 1972 model year Hornet was one of the first American cars to offer a special luxury trim package created by a renowned fashion designer. The "special interiors were stylish and unlike anything the industry had seen before, helping secure the company's reputation as a design leader."

Developed in conjunction with Italian fashion designer Dr. Aldo Gucci, the Gucci package was offered only on the Sportabout, the four-door wagon with a single sloping hatch replacing the then-traditional window/tailgate door. The Gucci option included special beige-colored upholstery fabrics on thickly padded seats and inside door panels (with red and green striping) along with Gucci logo emblems and a choice of four exterior colors: Snow White; Hunter Green; Grasshopper Green, and Yuca Tan. The Gucci model proved to be a success, with 2,583 produced in 1972 (and 2,252 more for 1973) Sportabouts that were so equipped.

American Motors also produced a one-off Sportabout for Gucci's personal use. The car included the 304 cu in (5.0 L) V8 engine with three-speed automatic transmission. The interior featured leather on the door panels, cargo area as well as special front and rear center armrests. The doors and custom-designed bucket seats received red and green striped inserts. The instrument panel was given a centrally located, pull-out writing desk, graced with a scribbler and a sterling silver bamboo pen. A map light at the end of a flexible arm extended from the right side of the desk while the left side carried a vanity mirror that was also mounted on a flexible stem. The backs of the front seats included compartments as on airlines. The one on the right side opened as a snack table or provided a flat surface for playing games. The compartment behind the driver concealed a miniature liquor cabinet, complete with four sterling silver tumbles and two decanters—all decorated with red and green enamel stripes.

American Motors followed this designer influence in successive years with the Cardin Javelin in 1973 and the Cassini Matador in 1974, but there were no new signature designer versions after those. This trim package concept inspired other automakers – including Ford's luxury marque, Lincoln in 1976 – to offer packages styled by other famous fashion designers.

==== Green Hornet ====
In 1972, AMC's Canadian Brampton Assembly plant produced a two-door Hornet that was marketed only in Canada as the limited edition Green Hornet to "cash in on the popular Green Hornet hero."

In addition to being painted green, the model included a "Baja" grain vinyl-covered roof and came standard with sport-styled wheel covers, and whitewall tires. The 232 cu in (3.8 L) I6 engine was standard along with a three-speed Torque-Command automatic transmission. Options included bucket seats, body side stripes, and the 258 cu in (4.2 L) I6 or 304 cu in (5.0 L) V8 engine. Production was limited to 300 of this special model.

=== 1973 ===
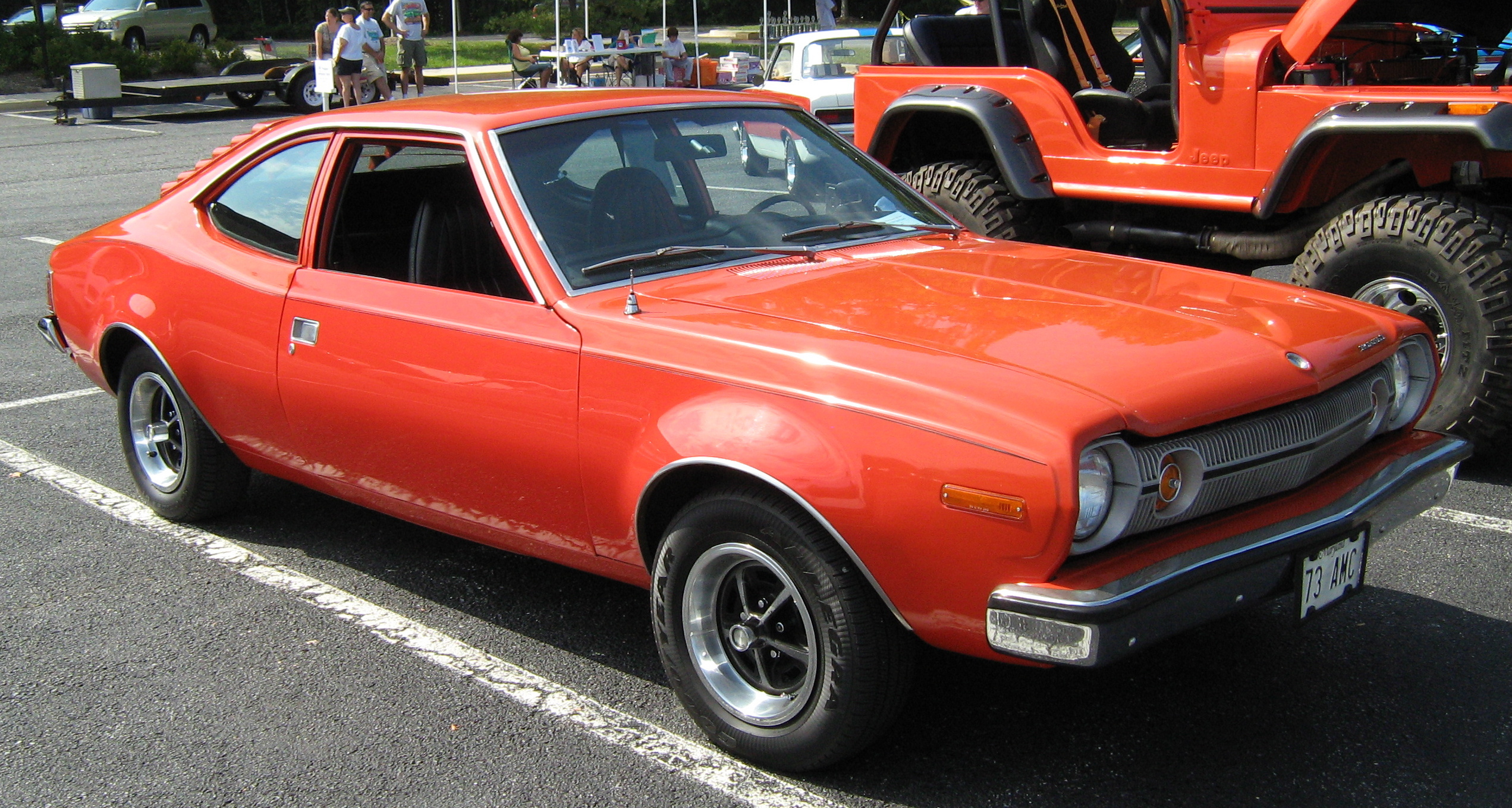
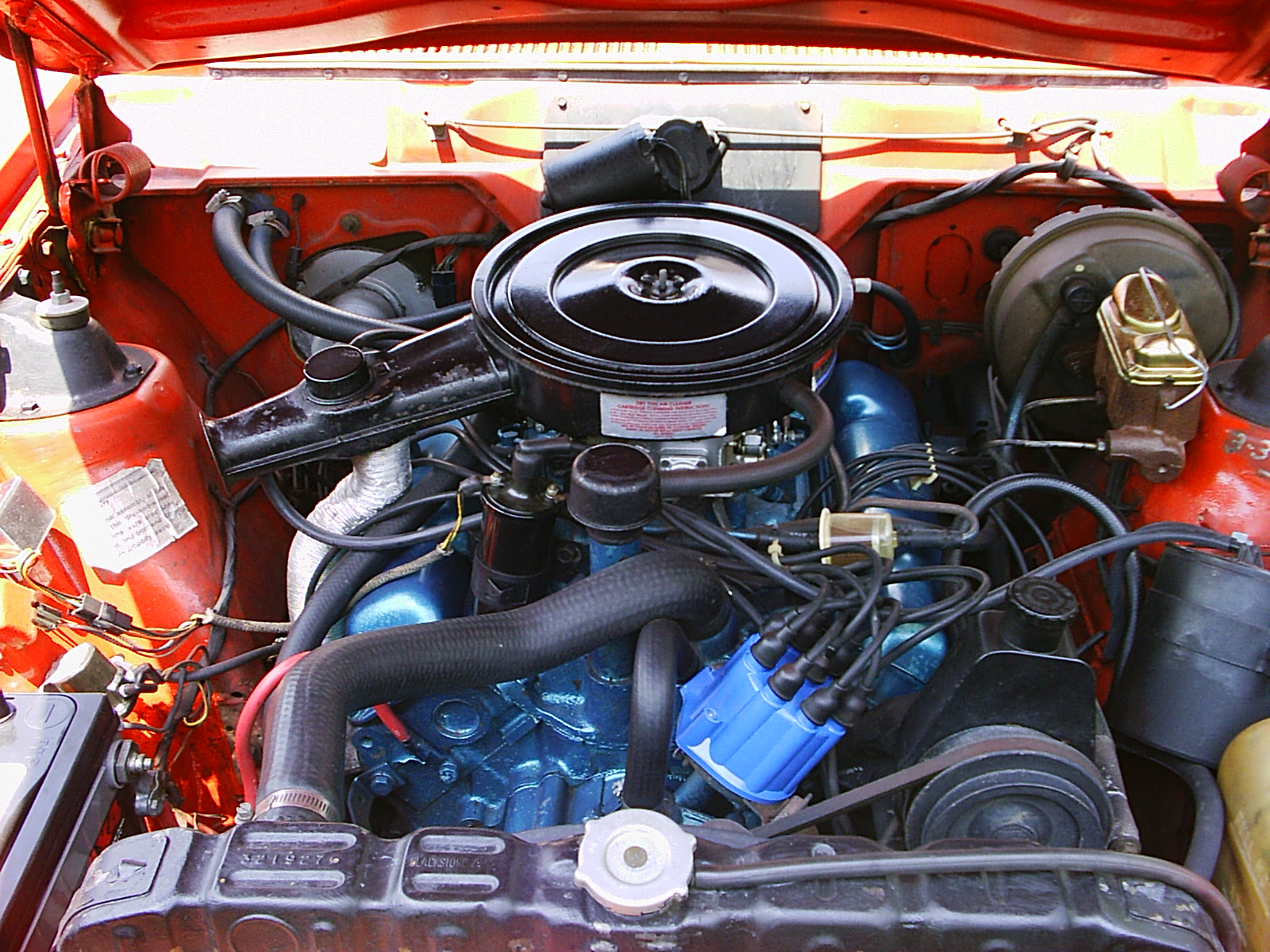
1973 Hornet hatchback with 304 (5.0 L) V8
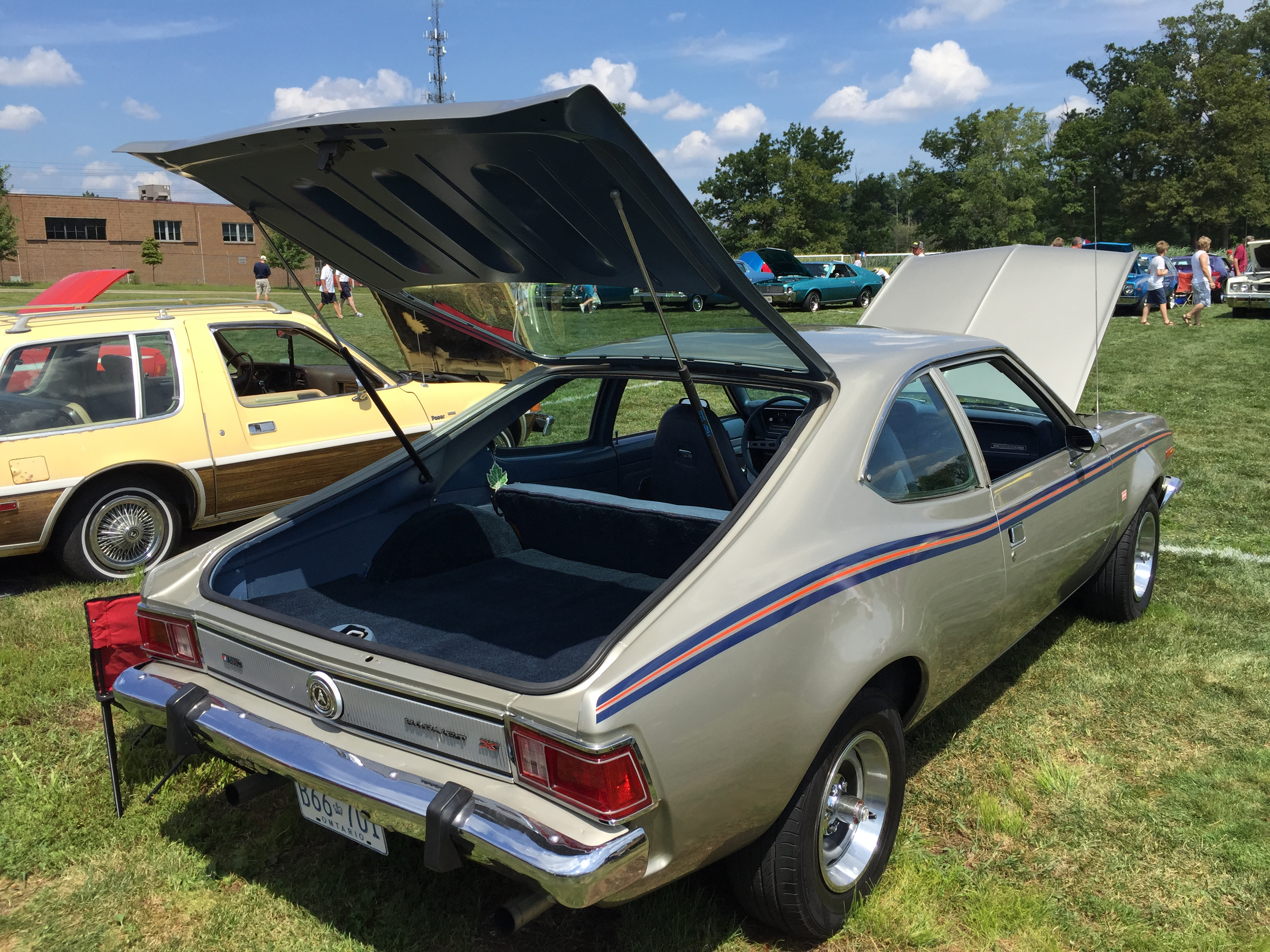
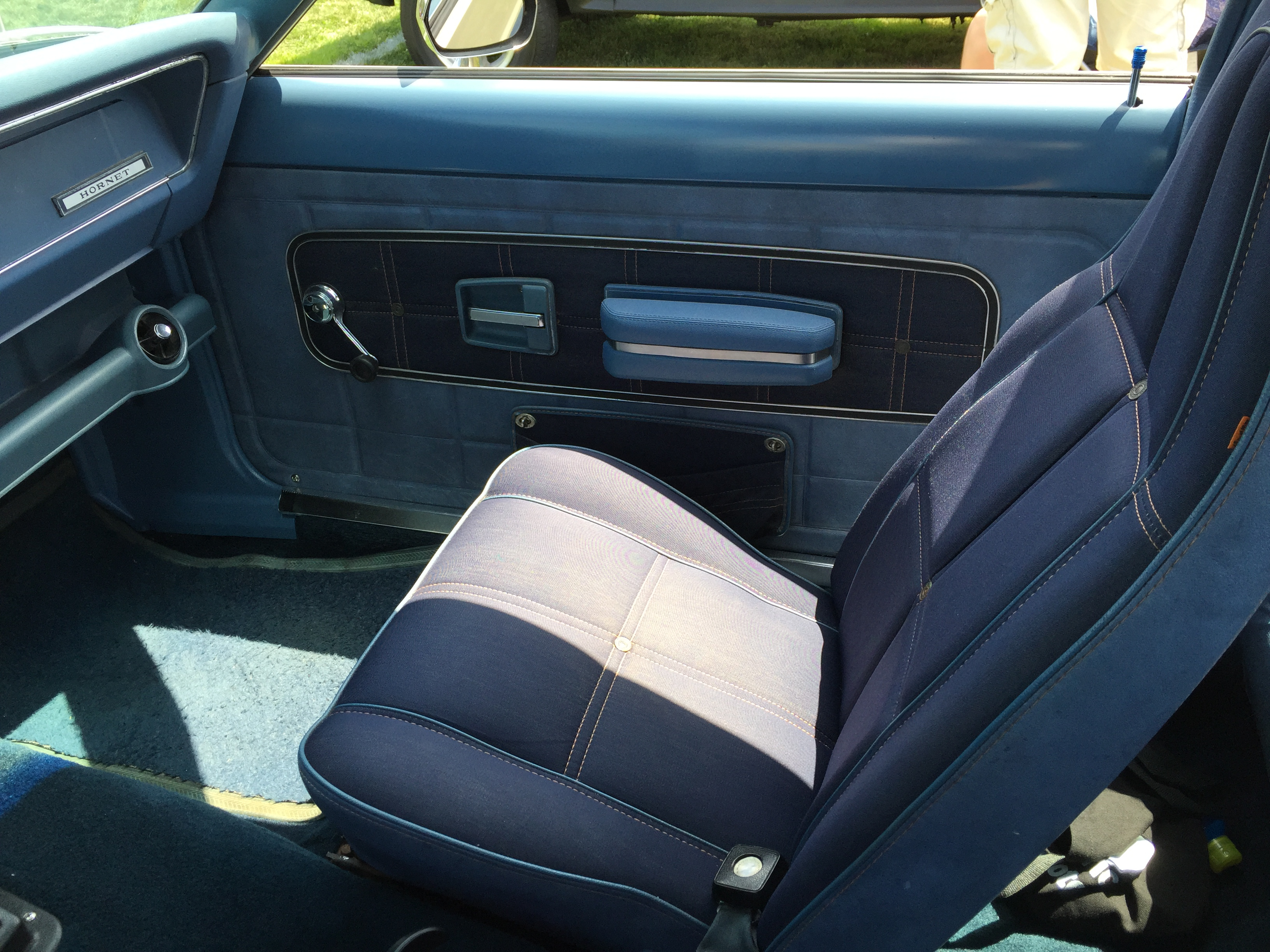
1973 Hornet hatchback with Levi interior

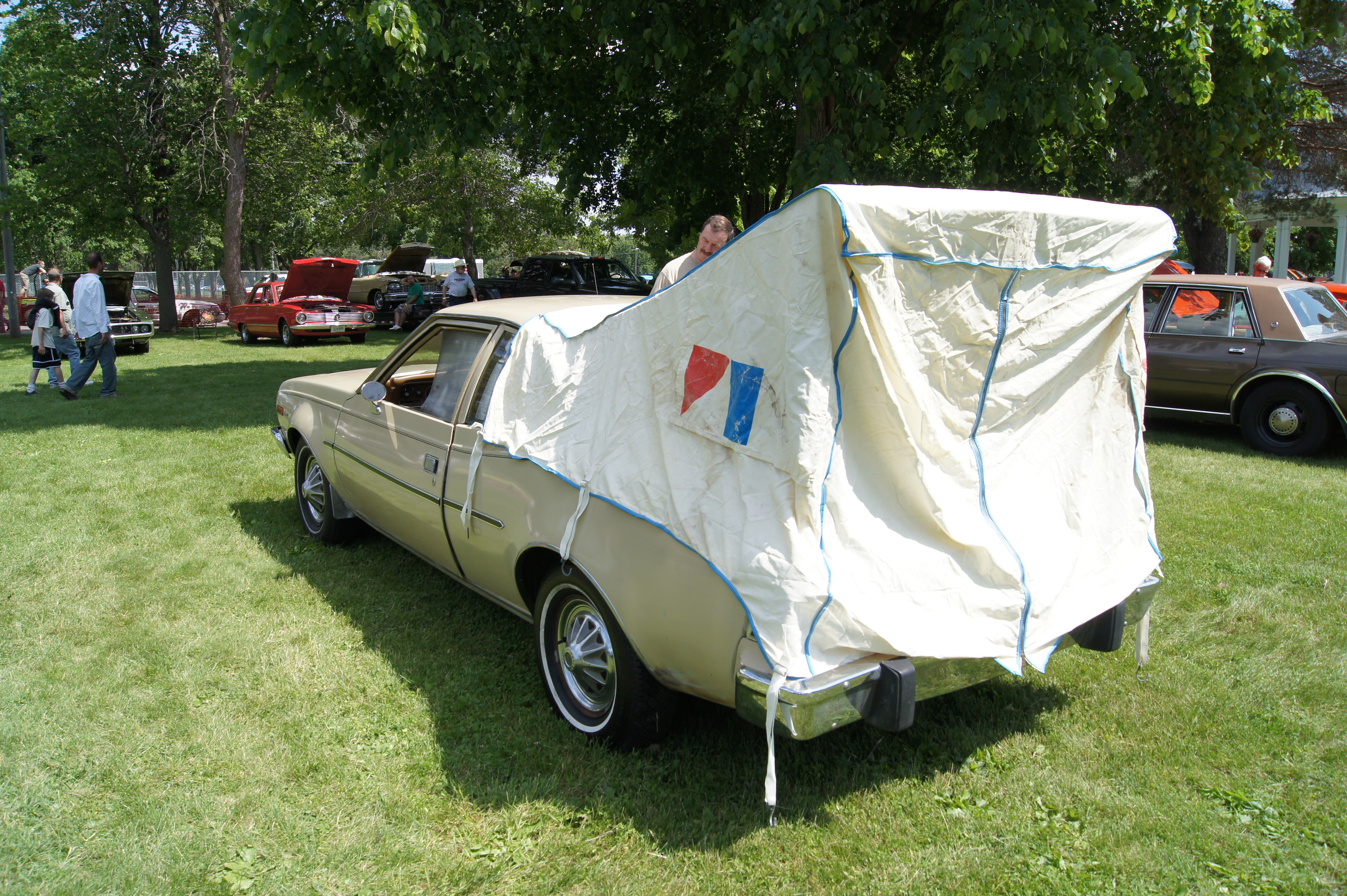
AMC's Mini-Camper accessory

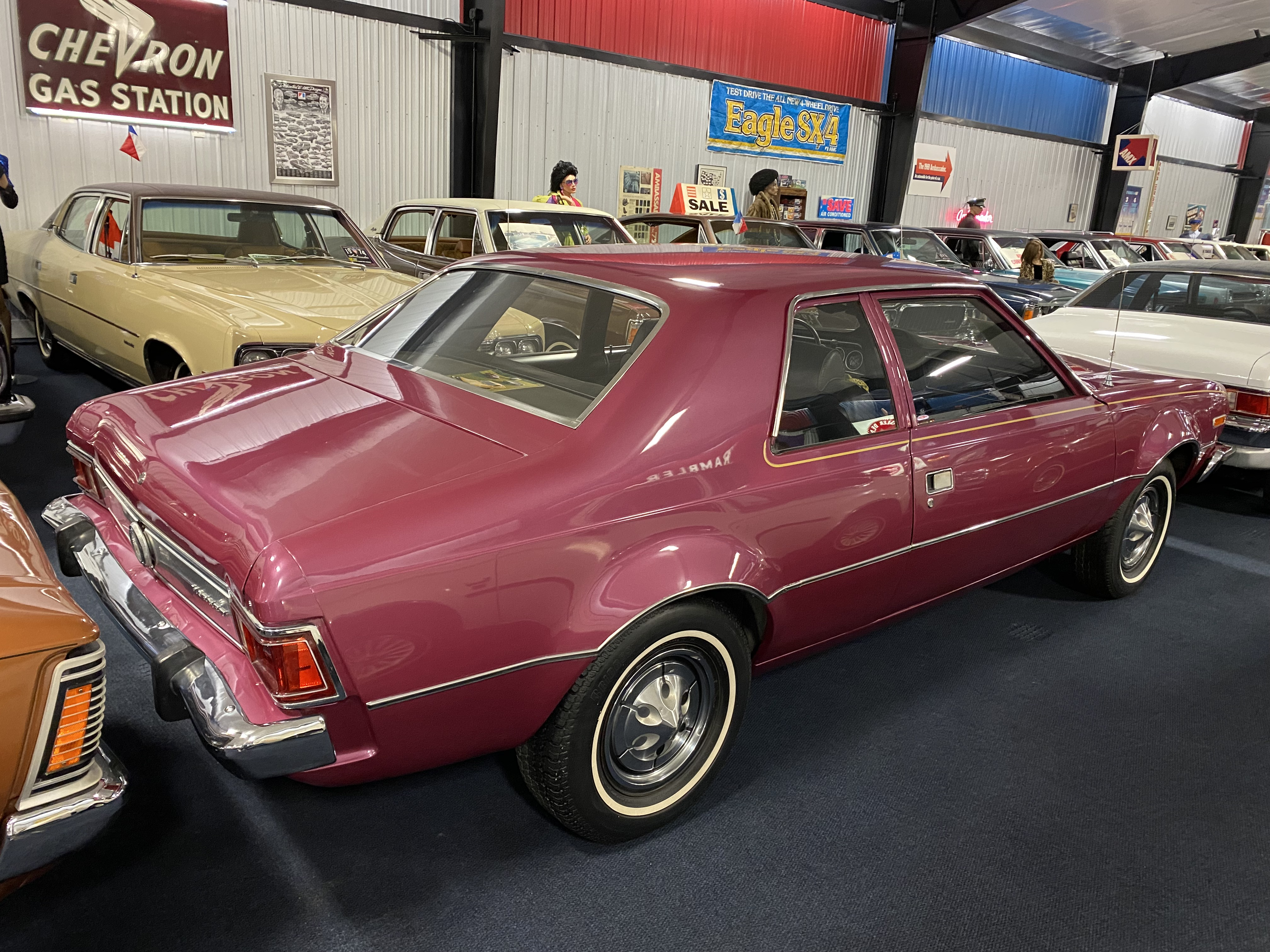
1973 Hornet two-door sedan

The biggest visible changes among all AMC automobiles for the 1973 model year were to the Hornet line and its new model, a two-door hatchback. Car and Driver magazine called it "the styling coup of 1973". Other changes included a new front-end design and bodywork with a V-shaped grille, a slightly recessed and longer hood, and longer peaked front fenders. The facelift incorporated a new stronger and larger energy-absorbing recoverable front bumper system with a horizontal rubber strip that met the new no-damage at 5-mile-per-hour (8.0 km/h) National Highway Traffic Safety Administration (NHTSA) safety legislation. The rear also received a new 2.5 mph (4.0 km/h) bumper with twin vertical rubber guards, but the 5 mph unit (matching the front) was optional. The overall length of the Hornet was increased by 6 inches (152 mm).

For the 1973 model year, the SST designation was dropped from the Hornet line, and all were simply called Hornet. The newly introduced two-door hatchback incorporated a fold-down rear seat for increased cargo volume from 9.5 to 30.5 cubic feet (269 to 864 L). An optional hinged floor made a hidden storage space that housed a temporary use "space-saver" spare tire and created a flat load area space totaling 23 cu ft (651 L).

The new hatchback was available with Levi's bucket seat interior trim option that was made of spun nylon fabric, rather than real cotton denim, to comply with flammability standards as well as offer greater wear and stain resistance. The interior included copper Levi's rivets, traditional contrasting stitching, and a traditional Levi's tab on both the front seat backs, as well as door panels with Levis trim with removable map pockets while the exterior included "Levi's" decals on the front fenders.

An optional dealer accessory was available to convert the open hatchback area into a recreational vehicle or camper with mosquito net windows. The Mini-Camper Kit converted an open hatchback into a camping compartment and enough room for sleeping with the rear seat folded down. The "Mini-Camper" was a weatherproof covering that fitted over the roof section from the B-pillar back to the rear bumper that was easy to set up.

The two- and four-door sedan models were carried over while the Sportabout wagon received a new optional upscale "D/L" package. This trim package included exterior woodgrain bodyside decal panels, a roof rack with a rear air deflector, and individual reclining seats upholstered in plush cloth. The Gucci edition wagon was continued for one more year with five exterior color choices. The "X" package was now available only for the Sportabout and hatchback. It included color-coordinated "rally" side stripes, 14 x 6-inch slot-style steel wheels with C78 x 14 Goodyear Polyglas tires, an "X" emblem, and a sports steering wheel.

Engines incorporated new emissions controls and the choices on all Hornet models included two I6s, the standard 232 cu in (3.8 L) or a 258 cu in (4.2 L) version, as well as two V8s, the base 304 cu in (5.0 L) or the 175 hp (130 kW; 177 PS) 360 cu in (5.9 L). Any Hornet model could be ordered with the two-barrel 360 engine and automatic transmission. Demand for classic muscle car cars had disappeared by 1973, but the Hornet was a relatively light car and was a "mildly spirited performer" in stock form with the new emissions gear. A Hornet hatchback with the 360 V8 was tested by Car and Driver. The 0-60 time was 8.4 seconds with a 3.15 rear axle ratio and the magazine noted that the Hornet hatchback was "...so good that AMC is sure to finally lose its underdog status."

A comparison road test by Popular Science selected the most "trend-setting" and "deluxe compacts" with V8 engines. The Hornet hatchback model was described as "one of the most modern cars on the market" and the 304 cu in (5.0 L) and automatic transmission-equipped Hornet hatchback recorded 0-60 acceleration 12.1 seconds and 16.453 mpg_{‑US} (14.296 L/100 km; 19.759 mpg_{‑imp}) fuel economy. Another Popular Science road test of compact four-door sedans compared the AMC Hornet 304 cu in (5.0 L), Ford Maverick 302 cu in (4.9 L), Chevrolet Nova 350 cu in (5.7 L), and Plymouth Valiant 318 cu in (5.2 L). The Hornet was described as having an interior 'filled with features to make riding and driving more enjoyable" as well as good braking, handling, and maneuverability. The test car's V8 "beat all the competition for best acceleration, and then beat them again in fuel economy."

Research sponsored by the U.S. National Highway Traffic Safety Administration (NHTSA) to improve front and side crashworthiness was first applied to production compact vehicles starting with the 1973 Hornet, which included stronger doors designed to withstand 2,500 pounds (1,134 kg) penetration in the first 6 inches (152 mm) of crush.

Spurred by AMC's success in its strategy of improving product quality, and an advertising campaign focusing on "we back them better because we build them better", the automaker achieved record profits. American Motors' comprehensive "Buyer Protection Plan" warranty was expanded for the 1973 models to cover lodging expenses should a car require overnight repairs when the owner is away from home.

Suggested prices began at $2,298 for the base model two-door sedan with the more popular new hatchback going for $2,449.

1973 production:

2-door: 23,187
4-door: 25,452
Wagon: 44,719 (Gucci version: 2,251)
Hatchback: 40,110

=== 1974 ===
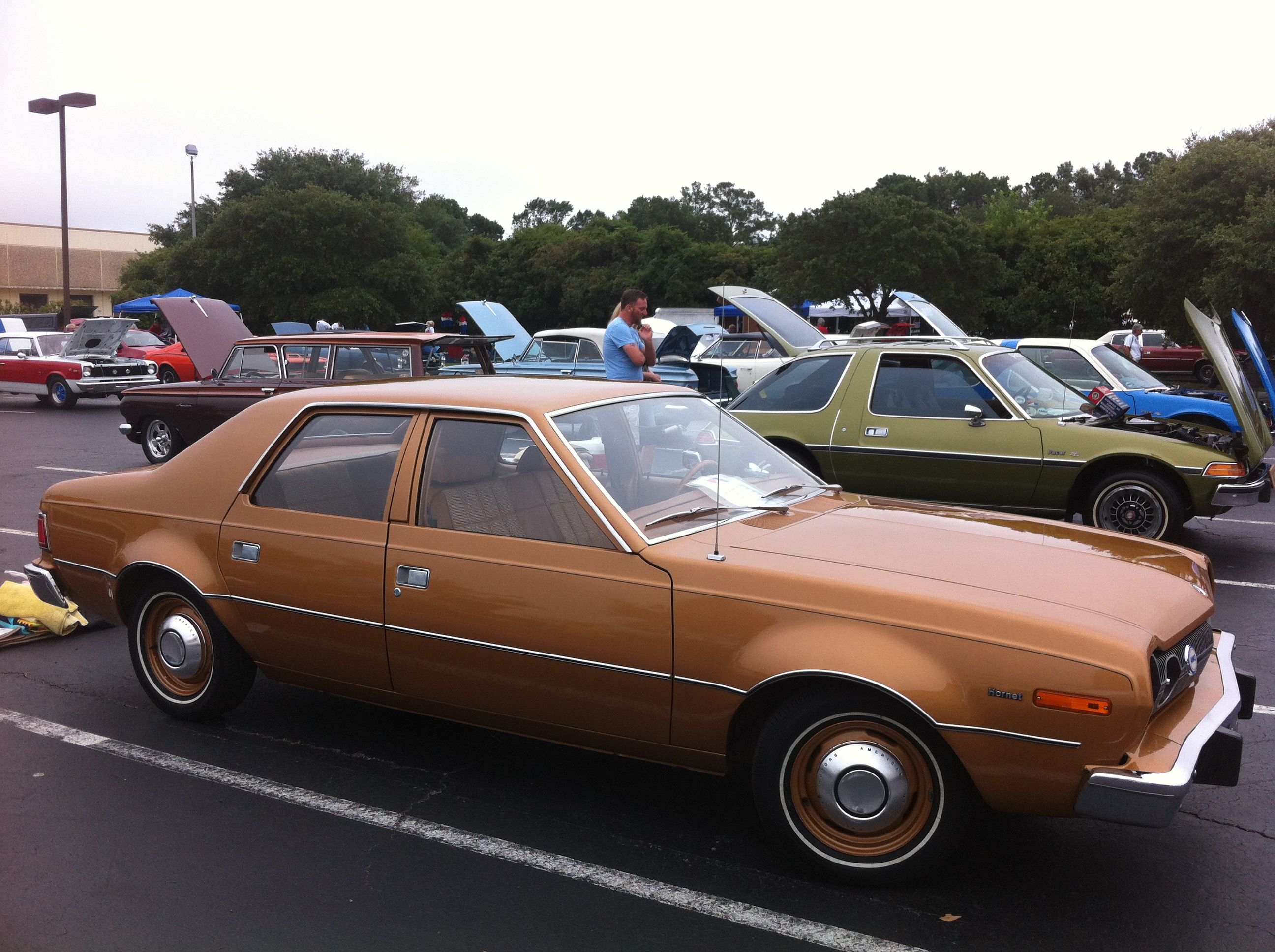
1974 AMC Hornet base model

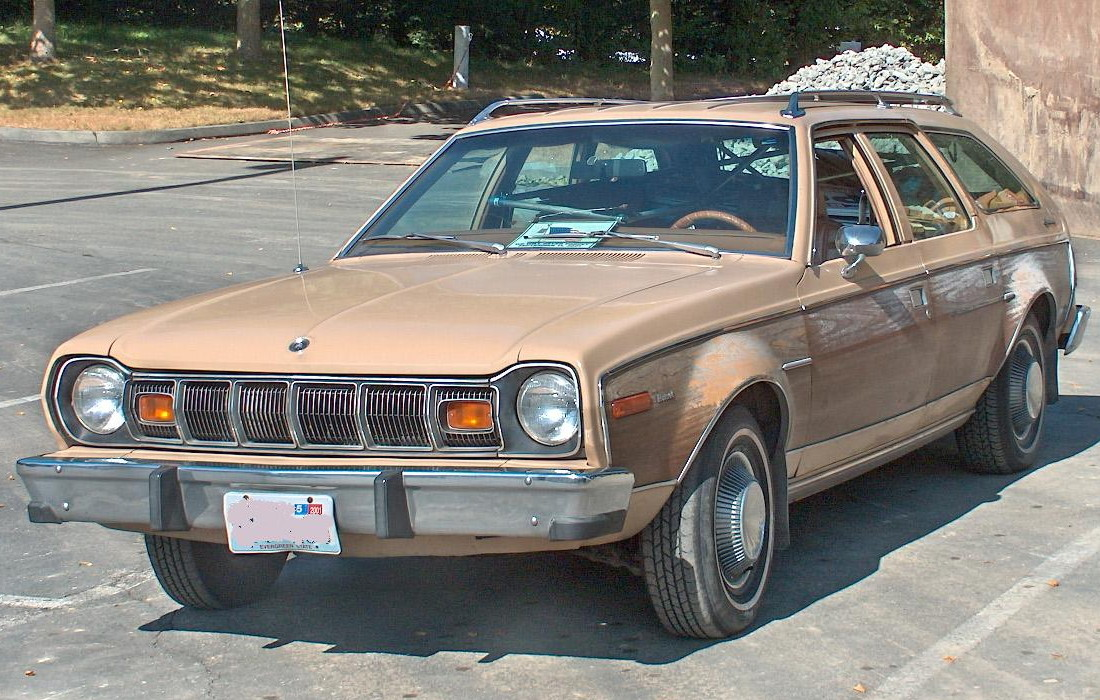
AMC Hornet station wagon

All four versions of the Hornet were mostly carryovers in 1974, with minimal trim changes. The front bumper lost its full-width vinyl rub strip but gained two rubber-faced bumper guards. A larger energy-absorbing rear bumper was added to meet new 5 miles per hour (8.0 km/h) front and rear safety standards requiring the license plate to be moved up to a position between the taillights. The design of these bumpers has been evaluated as not detracting from the Hornet's styling compared to some used by the competition.

New inertial-reel seat/shoulder belts were standard. Additionally, the NHTSA required all new cars to include an inexpensive technology called a "seat belt interlock mechanism" for front-seat passengers to buckle up before the engine would start. However, Congress quickly passed a law killing the interlock mechanism and ordering that the warning sound indicating an unsecured front seat passenger could last no more than eight seconds.

A review by Popular Science of the 1974 cars and achieving fuel economy described the Hornet Sportabout as the only domestically built compact station wagon and they "give it our highest recommendation."

Marketing of the 1974 Hornet included placement as a lead vehicle in a James Bond movie The Man With The Golden Gun which included a chase scene with a red hatchback jumping a broken bridge. All Hornet body styles saw sales gains compared to the previous year.

1974 production:

2-door: 29,950
4-door: 29,754
Wagon: 71,413
Hatchback: 55,158

=== 1975 ===
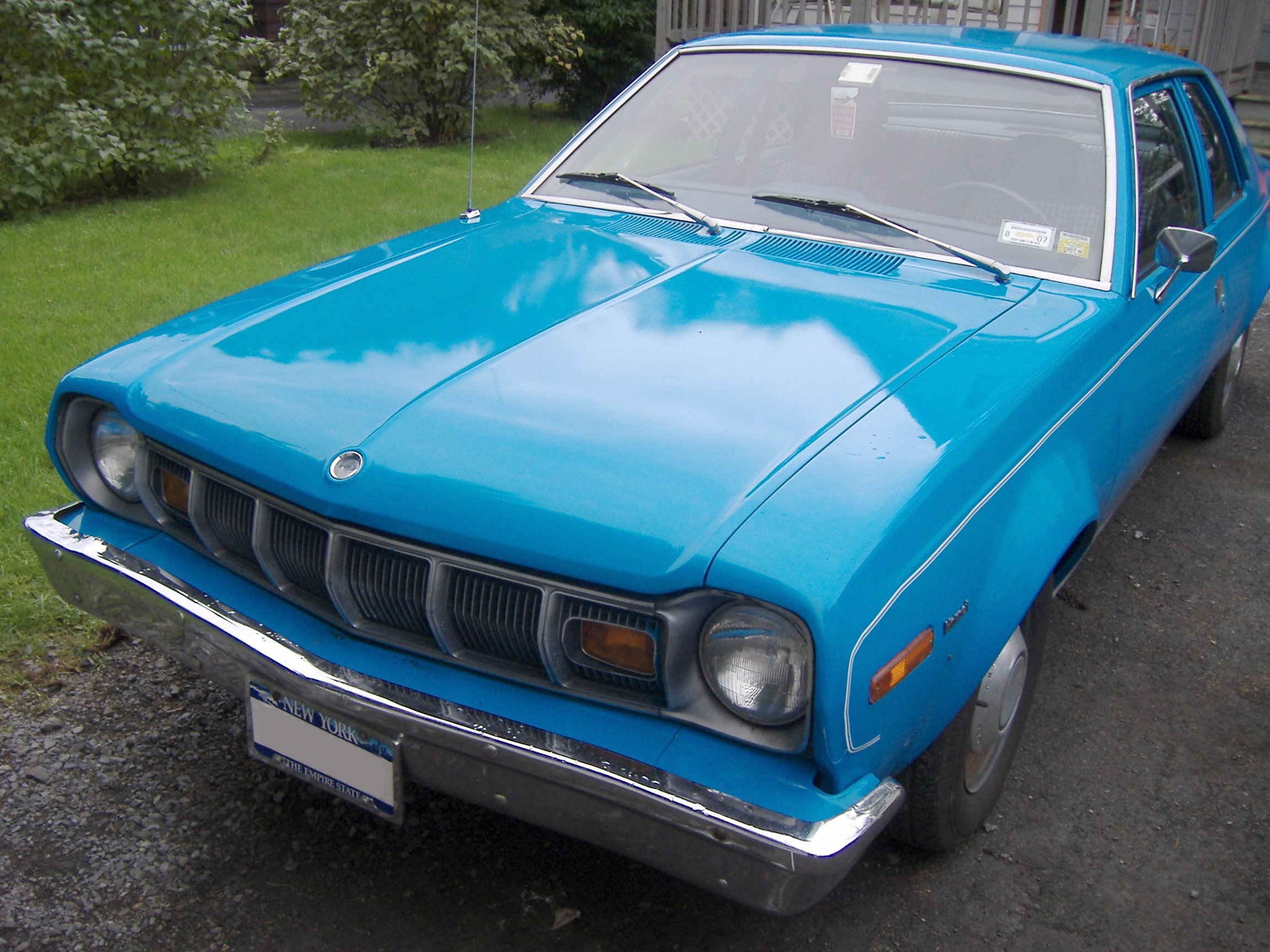
1975 Hornet 2-door

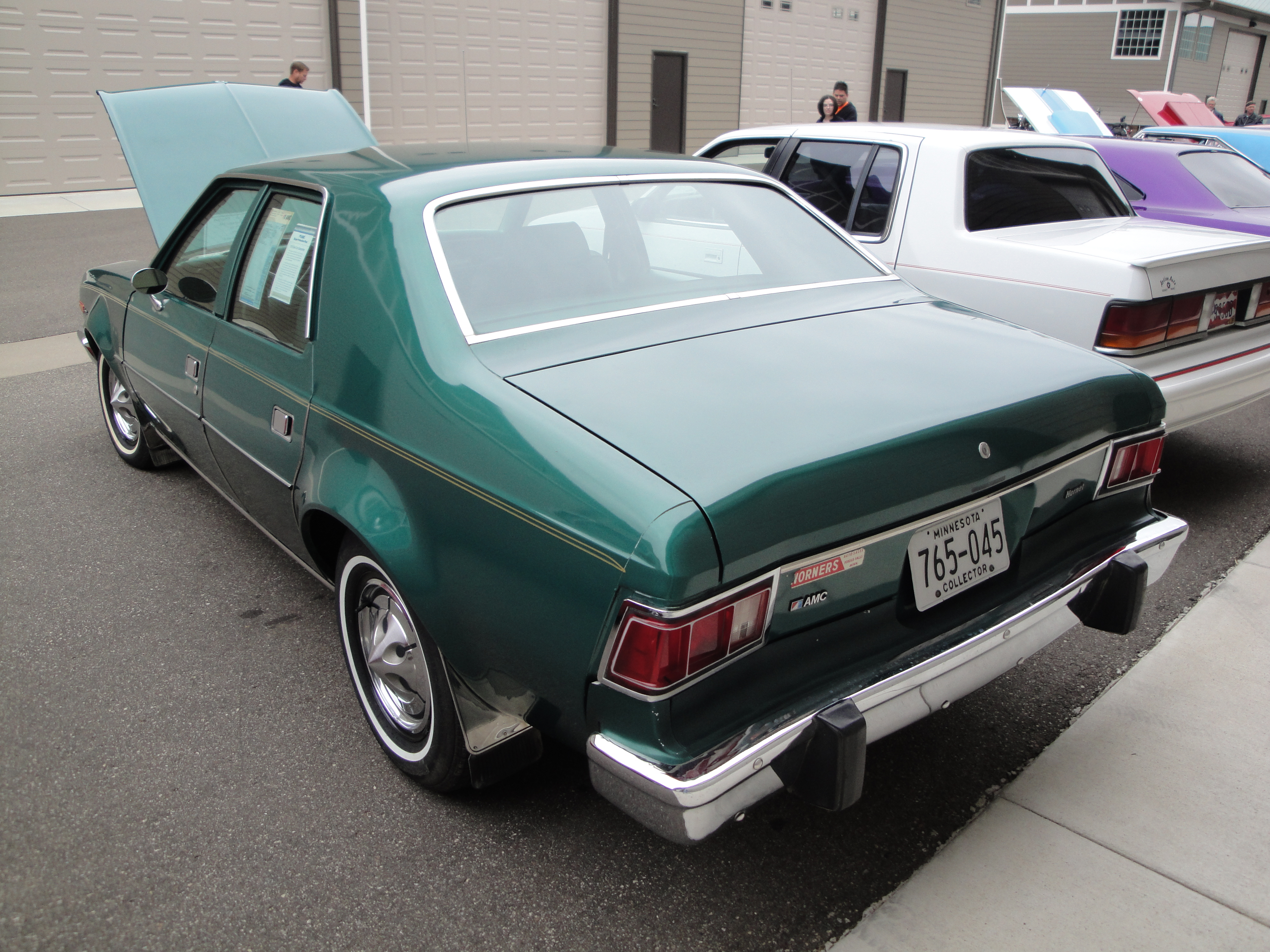
1975 Hornet 4-door

Focusing on developing and introducing the entirely new Pacer model, AMC kept the Hornet mostly the same. A new grille with vertical grating was the primary change. A new "Touring Package" included special upholstery and luxury features. In a return to its philosophy of economical compact cars, AMC emphasized its comprehensive "Buyer Protection Plan" warranty in marketing the Hornets.

Six-cylinder Hornets could be ordered with a new British-supplied Laycock de Normanville "J-type" overdrive. Optional on cars with a manual three-speed transmission, the unit was controlled by a pushbutton at the end of the turn signal stalk. The overdrive unit engages automatically at speeds above 35 mph (56 km/h) and drops out at 32 mph (51 km/h). It also included an accelerator pedal kick-down switch for faster passing.

All U.S. market Hornets featured catalytic converters and now required gasoline without tetraethyl lead. "Unleaded Fuel Only" warnings were displayed on both the fuel gauge and on a decal by the fuel filler. Consumers complained loudly about the 1974 "mandatory seat belt" system, and it was replaced in 1975 with a simple reminder buzzer and light.

The U.S. economy was experiencing a period of high inflation, with American Motors increasing the suggested sticker prices by an average of 13%, and new car sales fell for all automakers. The industry sold 8.2 million units, a drop of more than 2.5 million from the record pace in 1973. Sales of the Hornet also declined although marketing included cash rebates to buyers that ranged from $200 to $600 a car or a combination of cash and an extension of its Buyer Protection” warranty valued at $99.

1975 production:

2-door: 12,392
4-door: 20,565
Wagon: 39,593
Hatchback: 13,441

=== 1976 ===
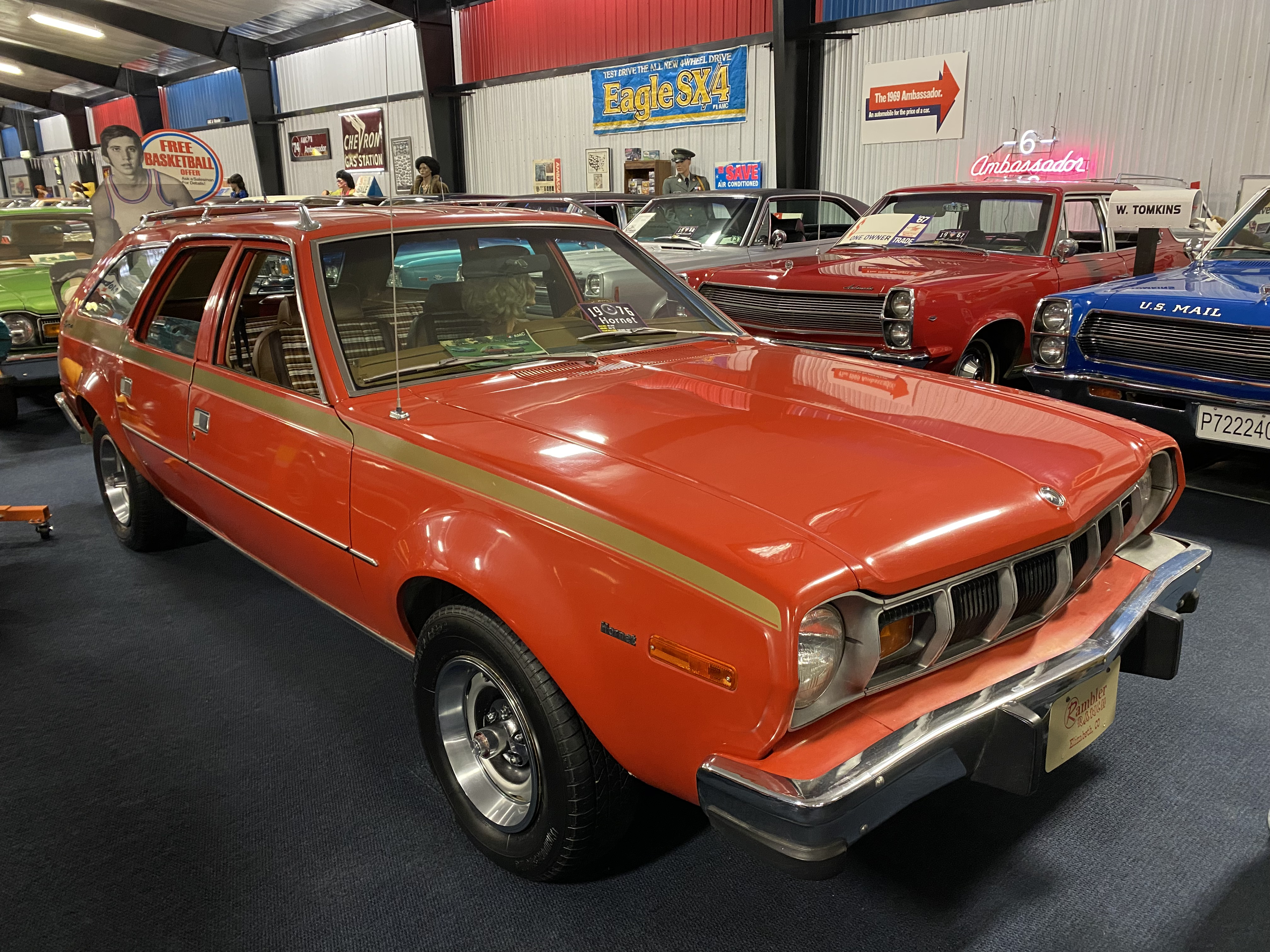
1976 Hornet Sportabout

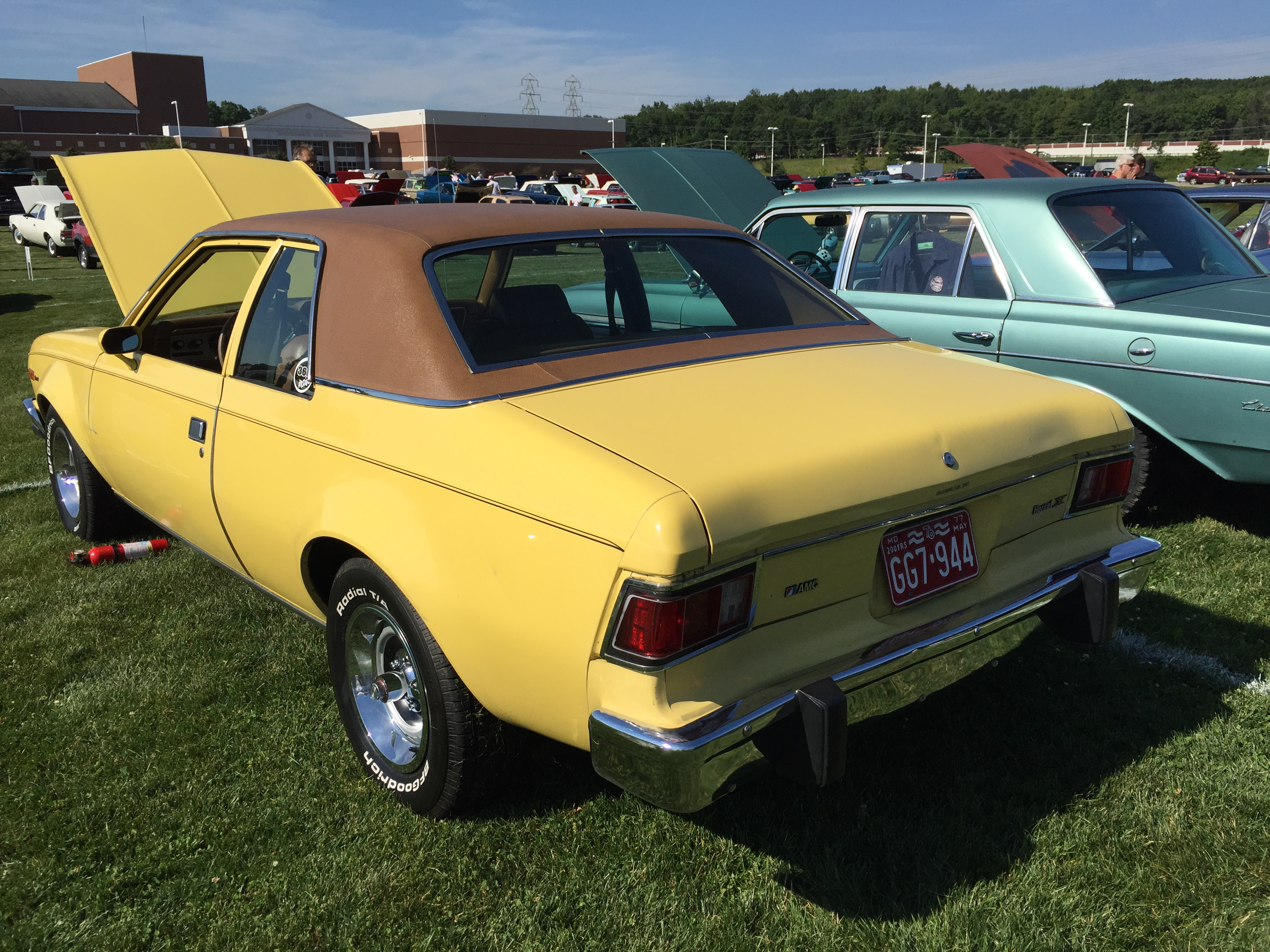
1976 Hornet two-door sedan

American Motors experienced success with the innovative Pacer and increased production of the unchanged 1976 model Pacers to 800 units a day. The problem with the sales of the Pacer was the negative impact on the sales of both the compact Hornet and subcompact Gremlin models.

In its sixth year as a carryover model, AMC priced the Hornet sedan and hatchback at the same as the year before with only the Sportabout slightly higher. The 1976 model year saw the introduction of the Dodge Aspen and Plymouth Volare twins that included a station wagon body style. These had a more upright top-hinged rear tailgate with a lower lift-over with greater cargo capacity than the Sportabout and they ended AMC's monopoly on domestic compact-sized wagons.

1976 production:

Total: 71,577

=== 1977 ===
The Hornet line was mostly unchanged for 1977 with improvements made to engines and transmissions for increased fuel efficiency and the effects of new nitrogen oxides (NO_{x}) emission standards. All three-speed manual transmissions shifters were now mounted on the floor. A new "AMX" model also appeared.

1977 production:

2-door: 6,076
4-door: 31,331
Wagon: 28,891
Hatchback: 11,545

==== AMX ====
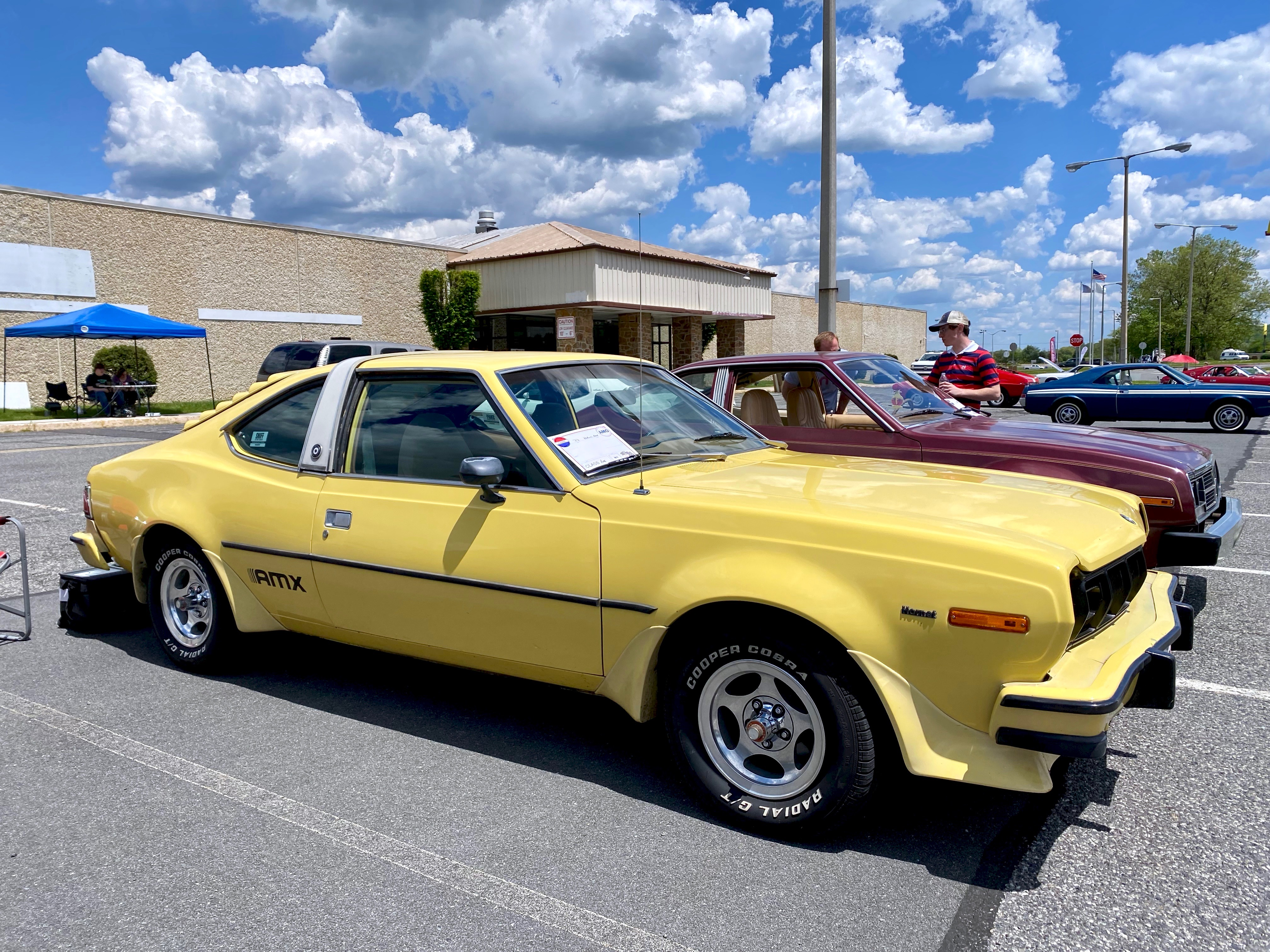
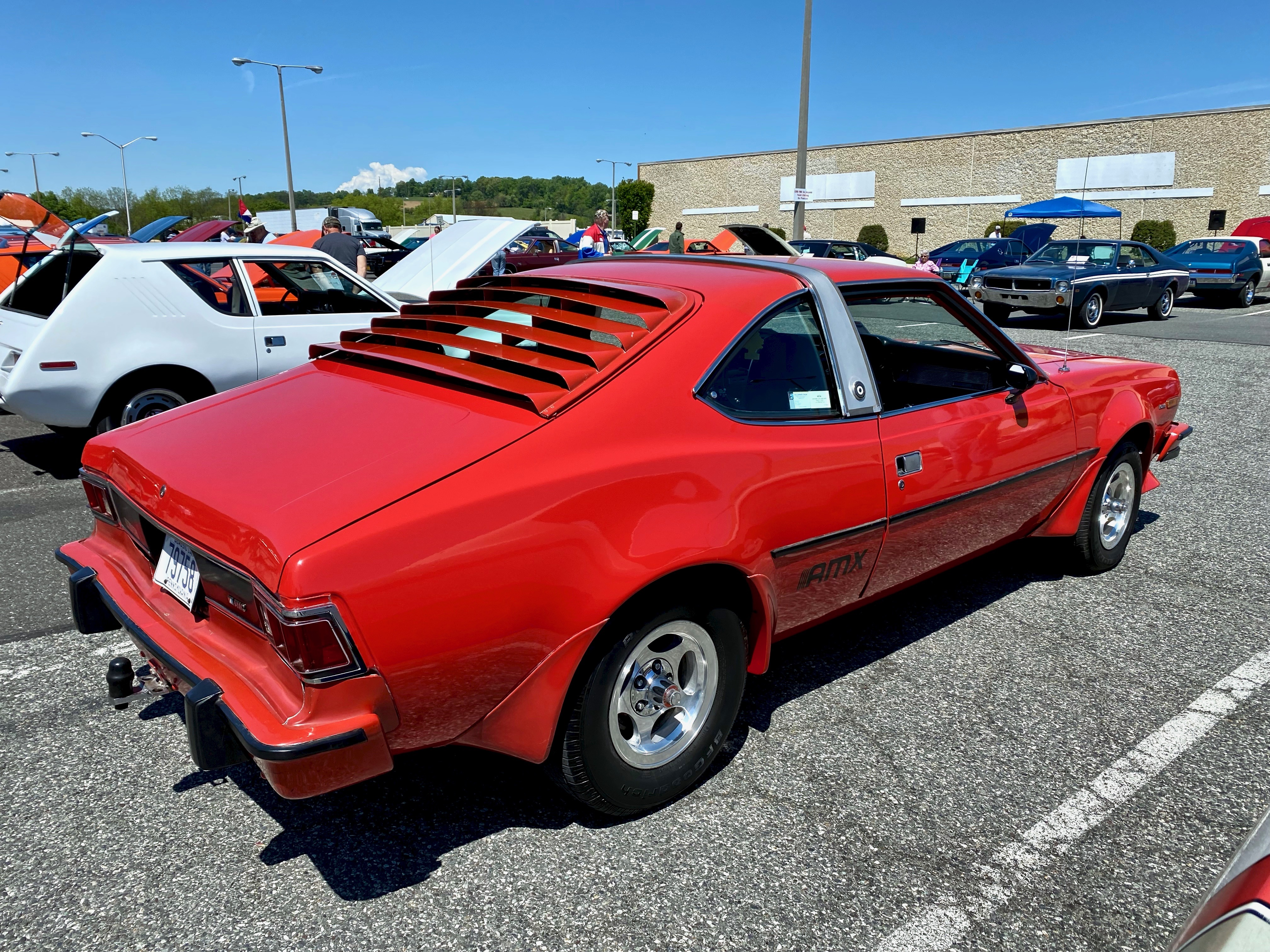
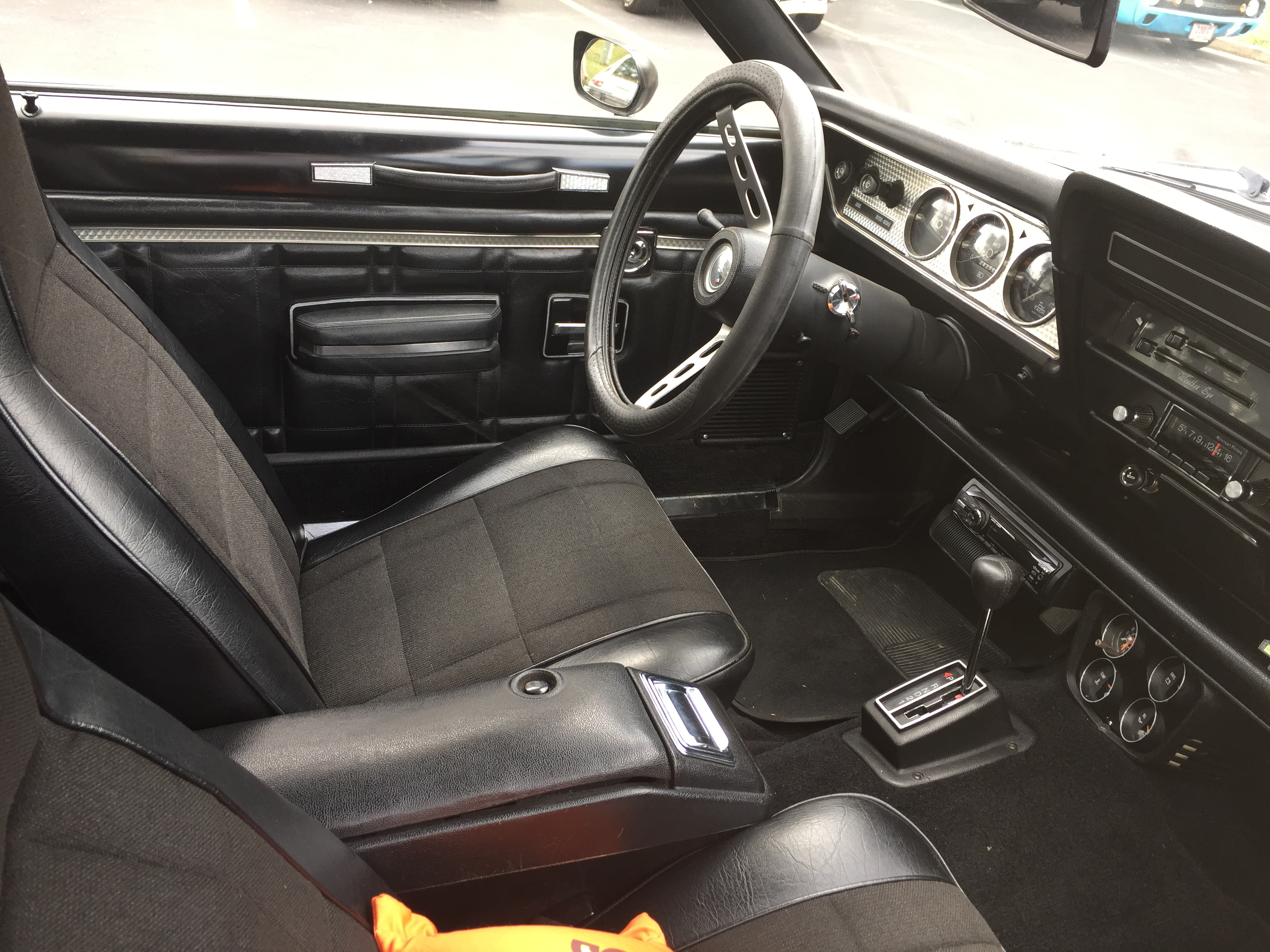
1977 Hornet AMX

A new sports-oriented model, the AMX, was introduced to appeal to young, performance-oriented car buyers. This model marked the return of a famous name that evoked AMC's original AMX two-seat sports car. It was one of the revived muscle cars by the domestic automakers. The AMX was available only as a hatchback with the I6 featuring a floor-shifted four-speed manual or optional floor shifted automatic transmission. The only transmission with the 304 cu in (5.0 L) V8 engine was the automatic. Standard was an upgraded black or tan interior with a floor console, "rally" instrumentation with tachometer, and a "soft-feel" sports steering wheel.

The Hornet AMX "looked the part of a true performance car" with its standard spoilers, airfoils, and body-colored rear window louvers. It was available in only four exterior colors. The Alpine White, Firecracker Red, Sunshine Yellow, or Lime Green colors included matching painted bumpers with a wraparound rubber guard strip, bodyside rubber guard strip, and contrasting AMX model identification bodyside decals ahead of the rear wheels. The exterior featured a front spoiler integrated into the front lower fender extensions, rear lower fender flares, sport-styled road wheels, brushed aluminum "Targa top" band over the B-pillars and roof, blacked-out grille, door and quarter frames, rear lower panel, and left and right outside mirrors. Options included bright aluminum road wheels as well as large Hornet-graphic decals on the hood and a smaller one on the decklid. In addition to the standard upholstery colors, the Levi's interior was optional, but only 100 Hornet AMX models were so equipped. A regional "California Edition" was available with "C.E." decals on the front fenders and an optional Audiovox stereo system.

Popular Science road tested the AMC Hornet AMX 304 cu in (5.0 L), Ford Mustang II Cobra II 302 cu in (4.9 L), Chevrolet Monza Spyder 350 cu in (5.7 L), and Plymouth Volare Road Runner 318 cu in (5.2 L) noting that "in looks and performance they remind of, but don't match, yesterday's tire-burning rockets" and serve as "image cars" to what are "otherwise a sedate group of high-production compacts" for the fuel-efficiency focused consumers. The comparison noted its low-mounted bucket seats, superior rear seat room to that of the Mustang and Monza, and the rear window louvers that limit visibility to the rear. The Hornet AMX received high marks in entry/exit ease, maneuverability, and acceleration by achieving 0 to 60 mph in 12.0 seconds. Quicker was the Monza with the Road Runner slowest, but these "are pretty remarkable when you consider that these are smaller, fuel-stingy engines laden with emission controls to meet today's stringent emission requirements."

A total of 5,207 Hornet AMX were produced for the one model year, of which 3,196 had the six-cylinder and 2,011 with the V8 engine. The Hornet AMX, as well as the other similar cars from the Big Three, represented a "crucial stopgap between eras" from marketing muscle cars emphasizing power to offering models for customers "interested sporty looks, handling packages, and cool interior spiffs."

== Legacy ==
1973-74 AMC Hornet Sportabout on display at the Kenosha History Center

The Hornet was phased out after the 1977 model year. However, its robust and versatile rear-wheel-drive platform continued to serve as the foundation for subsequent AMC models. It transformed into a new "luxury compact" line of automobiles, the AMC Concord. The Hornet was re-engineered and restyled to become the 1978 Concord and helped establish the "luxury compact" market segment. With its upgraded design, components, and more standard features, the new Concord was moved upscale from the economy-focused Hornet. Changes to the AMC's "junior" platform made the new Concord more comfortable and desirable to buyers seeking an image of luxury, as well as greater value. Furthermore, demonstrating the enduring adaptability of its original design, the Hornet's chassis underpinned the innovative "crossover" all-wheel drive line of models, the AMC Eagle, which debuted in 1979 for the 1980 model year.

== International markets ==
The AMC Hornet was exported to international markets, as well as assembled under license from Complete knock down (CKD) kits that were shipped from AMC's U.S. or Canadian plants. The foreign-built cars incorporated numerous components and parts that were produced by local manufacturers to gain tax or tariff preferences.

=== Australia ===
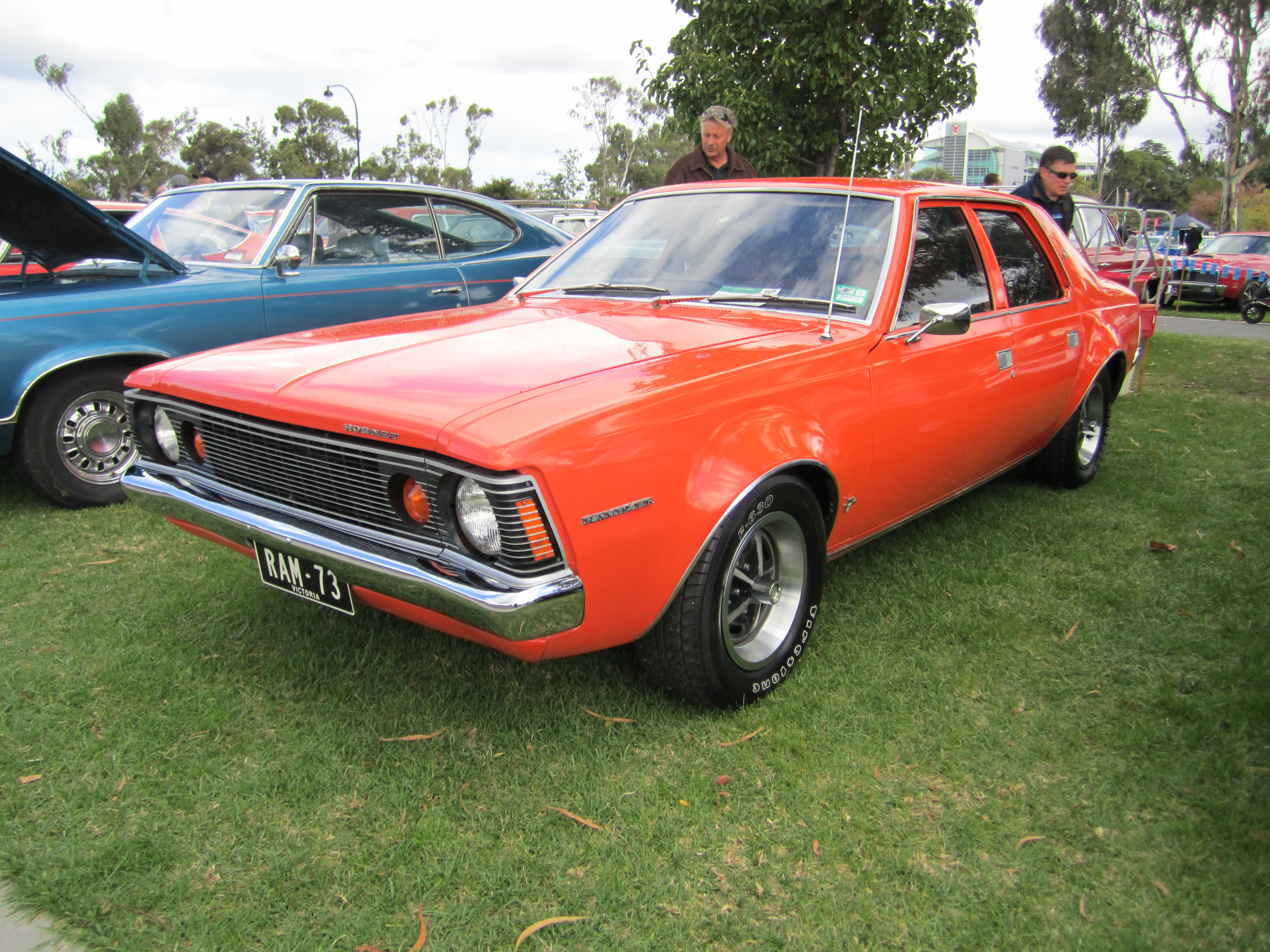
Rambler Hornet built by Australian Motor Industries

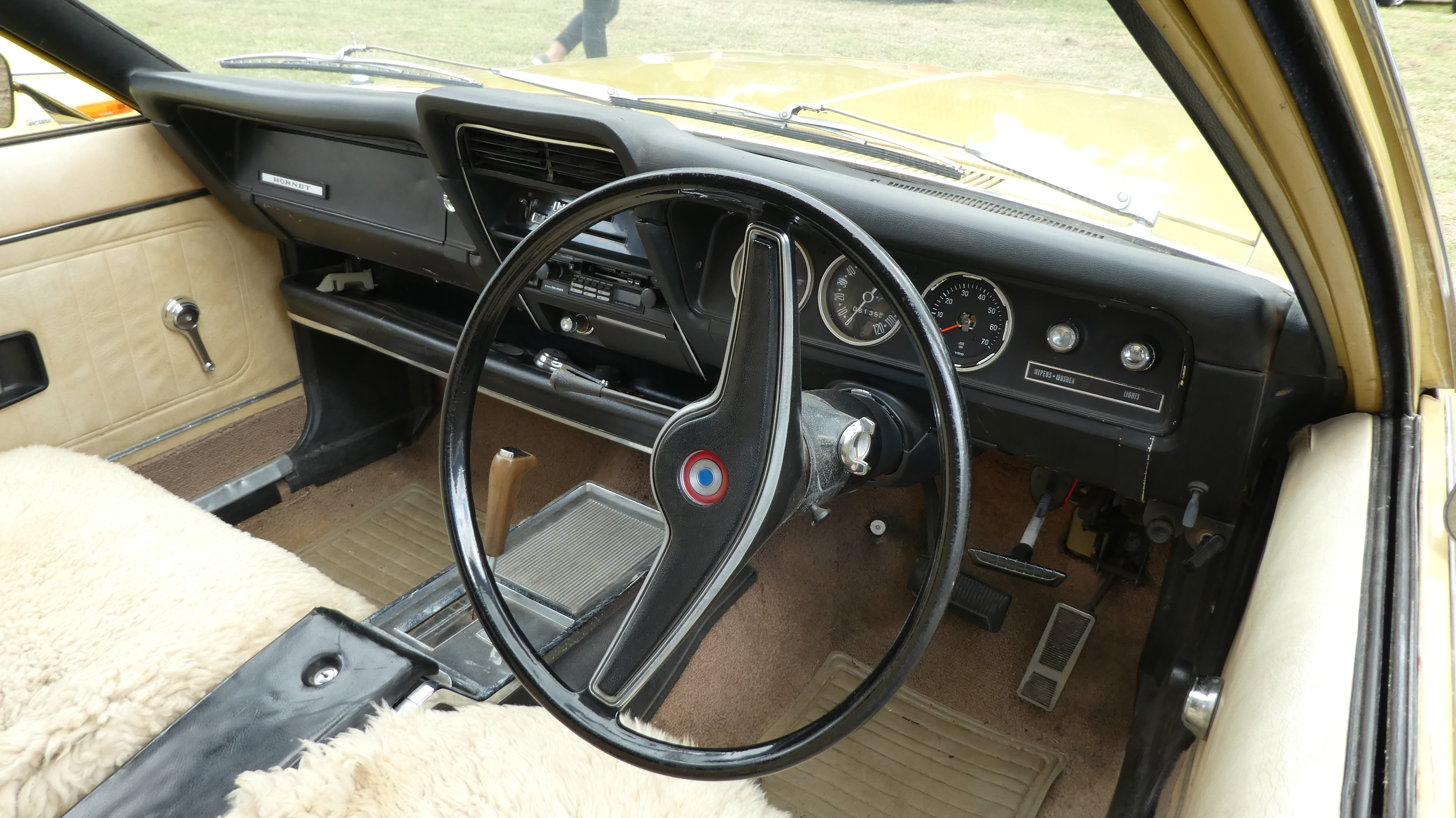
Australian 1973 Hornet in right-hand-drive

Between 1970 and 1975, a total of 1,825 Hornets were built in right-hand-drive at the Australian Motor Industries (AMI) factory at Port Melbourne in Victoria, Australia. The initial engineering to right-hand drive and interior design was achieved firstly with South African-built Hornets and then used as the blueprint for Australian assembly. The Hornet was sold in Australia as the "Rambler Hornet", only in the four-door sedan body style. They were fitted with either a 232 cu in (3.8 L) or 258 cu in (4.2 L) I6 engine and with an automatic transmission.

Australian Hornets were a model year behind the U.S. models. In other words, the 1972 Australian model was a U.S. 1971 model. However, AMI did not import the U.S. 1973 models and therefore no Hornets were assembled in Australia for 1974. Production resumed in 1975, with AMI making the U.S. 1972 model once again.

While the Hornet was the least expensive compact model in the United States, the Hornet in Australia was a luxury model, with high levels of trim, carpet, tires, and accessories. These included high-back seats, fully lined boot and covered spare wheel. The Hornet used a PBR fully assisted dual braking system, and front disc brakes from the Javelin Trans Am. The Hornet sold for $3,999 in 1970, with 407 cars being sold in Australia in that year. Sales peaked in 1971 with 597 sold. Sales dropped to 355 in 1972 and to 212 in 1973. 1974 saw 118 sales (of cars assembled in 1973.) 1975 was the Hornet's final year in Australia, with 136 sales.

=== Costa Rica ===
Purdy Motor was established in 1959 to import Toyota and AMC vehicles into Costa Rica.|Because of new laws requiring that all automobiles sold there be assembled locally from CKD (completely knocked-down), Purdy built an assembly plant in San Jose in 1965 to assemble Toyota and AMC vehicles for the local market. Purdy Motor would go on to assemble the Rambler American, Classic, Ambassador, Rebel, and Javelin during this time. Assembly of the Hornet began in 1970 and was marketed as the "Rambler SST."

In 1974 a new local vehicle manufacturer, Motorizada de Costa Rica, purchased the rights of Rambler distributorship from Purdy Motors. Motorizada continued to assemble AMC and Jeep vehicles as well as other brands. The Hornet Sportabout debuted in Costa Rica under the unusual name of the AMC Unisex, which was known in Mexico as the American 75.

Motorizada was liquidated in 1979 allegedly for not paying taxes thereby ending the AMC brand in Costa Rica.

=== Mexico ===
American Motors Corporation held a partial stake in Vehículos Automotores Mexicanos (VAM) and produced Hornet models in Mexico from 1970 through 1977. Available body styles included the two- and four-door sedans, as well as the four-door liftback wagon. The cars assembled in Mexico continued to be called VAM Rambler following the tradition of the VAM-built Rambler American models until 1974.

VAM models	AMC equivalent
Rambler American (until 1974)	Hornet base model
Rambler American Rally (2-door sedan only)	Hornet X hatchback
American (after 1975)	Hornet base model
American Rally (2-door sedan only)	Hornet X hatchback
American ECD (1975–1977)	Hornet DL two-door (1976 only) and four-door sedans
American GFS (1977)	Hornet DL two-door sedan
Camioneta American automática (1977)	Hornet DL wagon with automatic transmission

The VAM cars came with different trims and interiors than the equivalent AMC-made models. The models also combined different front clips, such as the 1977 VAM American came with the shorter U.S. and Canadian market 1977 Gremlin front-end, while its interior trim featured premium seats and upholstery. The engines in VAM models were based on AMC designs, but modified and built by VAM. Unique to Mexico were the 252 cu in (4.1 L) and 282 cu in (4.6 L) I6 engines. These were designed to cope with the high altitudes and low octane gasoline in Mexico.

==== VAM Rambler American ====
The initial VAM Rambler Americans were available in a single, nameless trim level (equivalent to the U.S. SST models), with only an optional performance-minded "Rally" package for the two-door sedans, carried over from 1969. The model was not available with the 199 cu in (3.3 L) I6 or any V8 engines. The muscle-oriented SC/360 and Hornet AMX were not made, and no Levis or Gucci trims were available. Legislation at the time allowed the manufacture of three body styles, so the hatchback version was not produced in Mexico. All VAM sporty versions of the Hornet were based on AMC's 1971 and 1972 two-door sedan counterparts. Unlike the Hornet, the now fourth-generation VAM Rambler American kept the same economy focus of its predecessor models despite its long list of standard equipment.

===== 1970 =====
The Hornet-based 1970 VAM Rambler American was available as a two- or four-door sedan. The standard 232 cu in (3.8 L) I6 producing 145 hp (108 kW; 147 PS) featured a 244-degree camshaft, 8.5:1 compression ratio, and a single-barrel Carter RBS or YF carburetor. Standard was a fully synchronized three-speed manual transmission with a column-mounted shifter, a heavy-duty clutch, a 3.54:1 rear differential gear ratio, regular suspension, four-wheel drum brakes, manual steering, a four-bladed rigid-engine fan, and a regular cooling system.

Standard convenience equipment included a two-tone padded dashboard with a three-pod instrument cluster, electric windshield wipers and washers, a 200 km/h speedometer, side marker lights, four-way hazard lights, antitheft steering column locking mechanism, base steering wheel, brake system warning light, AM radio with a single in-dash speaker, front ashtray, cigarette lighter, locking glove box with "RAMBLER" emblem on the door, padded sunvisors, day/night rearview mirror, cardboard-type sound-absorbing and heat-isolating headliner, round dome light, dual coat hooks, flip-open rear side vents, full carpeting, driver's side rubber floor mat sewed to the carpet, front bench seat with split folding backs on two-door sedan or with a fixed back on the four-door, bench rear seat, two-point front seatbelts, dual rear ashtrays, front and rear side armrests, vinyl and cloth upholstery on seats and side door panels, aluminum grille, backup lights, steel wheels with center hubcaps, dual "232 SIX" rear quarter panel emblems, dual "bulleye" emblems on the lower corner of the rear side vents, script "American" emblems on both front fenders, capital-lettered "RAMBLER" rectangular emblem between the right taillight and the gas filler, non-locking gas cap, manual driver's side remote mirror, and a radio antenna.

Factory options included a heater with windshield defroster, power drum brakes, power steering, bright exterior molding package, protective side moldings, parcel shelf, courtesy lights (separate or under-shelf), full wheel covers, deluxe or sports-style steering wheel, passenger's side remote mirror, remote-controlled driver's side remote mirror, a bright panel between taillights, and metal bumper guards with rubber edges. Dealership accessories included a universal 6000 RPM VDO tachometer with dual hands, vinyl-covered roof with additional bright moldings, heavy-duty suspension (front sway bar and stiffer adjustable shock absorbers), a floor-mounted shifter for the three-speed transmission, front disk brakes, locking gas cap, license plate frames, mud flaps, trunk cover, luggage rack, universal air conditioning system, among others.

===== 1971 =====
The VAM Rambler American sedans for 1971 were carried over from 1970. Enhancements included VAM's 266-degree camshaft for the 232 cu in (3.8 L) I6 engine, replacing AMC's 244-degree camshaft. Despite the power increase, the engine's official output remained 145 hp (108 kW; 147 PS) at 4,400 rpm. New interior colors, side armrests, and door panel designs were available. The AM radio was updated to a newer design. The new model year also introduced the Hornet Sportabout-based Camioneta Rambler American. The station wagon version included the same equipment as the two sedans, plus several additional features. The Camioneta Rambler American included the parcel shelf with courtesy lights as standard equipment. It was the only Mexican Hornet version to offer a three-speed automatic transmission as optional equipment. Wagons with the automatic transmission included the one-barrel 145 hp (108 kW; 147 PS) 232 cu in (3.8 L) engine, while those with a manual transmission had the Carter WCD carburetor rated at 155 hp (116 kW; 157 PS).

===== 1972 =====
The 1972 model year VAM models incorporated the engineering revisions and upgrades as the U.S.-market AMC-built counterparts. The one-barrel 145 hp (108 kW; 147 PS) 232 cu in (3.8 L) I6 was standard on sedans and wagons with automatic transmission. Station wagons with a manual transmission featured the two-barrel 155 hp (116 kW; 157 PS) version. All VAM Americans featured a front sway bar as standard equipment.The 1972 models also included a new plastic grille with a revised hood latch, a new taillight design with larger backup lights, a new optional wheel cover design, a third AM radio model (shared with the VAM Javelin), and new interior door panels with a wood-imitation rectangular panel. This was also the first year of the seatbelt warning buzzer located above the light and wiper knobs. The Camioneta Rambler American featured the Chrysler-built TorqueFlite A904 automatic transmission, replacing the previous Borg-Warner "Shift-Command" units.

===== 1973 =====
The 1973 model year VAM Hornets were redesigned. They incorporated the U.S.-version with a new front-end design with larger horizontal rectangular side marker lights, semi-square headlight bezels, and a V-shaped grille and hood edge. The front bumper included AMC's five-mile-per-hour design, but without the recovering shocks; in their place were regular rigid bumper mounts as in previous years. Mexico's car safety standards were less restrictive; thus, VAMs mounted the bumpers closer to the body than their AMC counterparts. The 258 cu in (4.2 L) I6 rated at 170 hp (127 kW; 172 PS) (gross) replaced the 232 engine. They featured Carter RBS/YF one-barrel carburetors, VAM's 266-degree camshafts, and an 8.5:1 compression ratio. The three-speed automatic transmission became available as an option on sedan models, and the rear differential gear ratio was changed to 3.31:1 across all units. Other features included new door panels, longer and narrower inside door latches, the cigarette lighter, wiper/washer, and lights now had soft rubber knobs, modified taillight lenses, the deletion of the rectangular "RAMBLER" emblem in favor of "American" script on the rear panel, "258" emblems replacing the "232 SIX" rectangular versions and the removal of the bullseye emblems on the C-pillar base.

===== 1974 =====
The 1974 Rambler American was a carryover. Differences included a new rear five-mile-per-hour bumper, and the rear license plate was relocated to the center of the rear panel over the gas filler. The seat and door panel designs were revised. The parking brake pedal received a smaller rubber pad. The standard wheels were VAM's new 14x6-inch five-spoke design with volcano-type hubcaps. The 258 cu in (4.2 L) I6 included an evaporative canister to reduce emissions and a slightly lower 8.3:1 compression ratio. Mid-year, the compression ratio was further reduced to 7.6:1. Nevertheless, the engines remained rated at 170 hp (127 kW; 172 PS).

==== VAM American ====
The introduction of the Gremlin line by VAM in 1974 became the company's smallest and most affordable model. There was a gap between the lower-end Rambler American line and the larger, top Classic (Matador) line. The differences in size and engine series between the Rambler American and the Gremlin were not enough for VAM to create the impression of a more solid, more diverse product line, since both cars were perceived as belonging to the same economy class, which would produce internal competition. The VAM Rambler American was restricted to the economy segment since its introduction to the Mexican market, the only exceptions to this being the luxury limited edition Rambler American Hardtop (Rambler American 440H in the U.S.) for 1963 and 1965, as well as the sporty Rambler American Rally (Rambler American Rogue and Hornet Rallye X/Hornet X in the U.S.) from 1969 through 1974. The model was shifted from the economy segment to the mid-segment when an all-new generation was introduced in 1975. This repositioned the company's full product line and rejuvenated the compact line. The Hornet-based Rambler American had been on the market for five years, continued to sell well, and maintained a positive image. The name was simplified from Rambler American to just American, marking the discontinuation of the Rambler brand in Mexico. A new luxury American ECD trim level was followed by a revised and improved American Rally and American base models. These differentiated the line from the Gremlin. All versions obtained updates and upgrades.

===== 1975 =====
The American base model in its first year featured all-new rectangular amber parking lights, a grille divided into six rectangular sections, and more hexagonal-lined headlight bezels. Manual front disk brakes were standard (though a few manual-transmission units still included front drums). The 258 cu in (4.2 L) I6 engine was rated at 170 hp (127 kW; 172 PS) and featured Prestolite electronic ignition. This engine was carried over with a 7.6:1 compression ratio, 266-degree camshaft, and a single-barrel Carter YF or RBS carburetor. Interiors included new door panels available in solid or two-tone colors, as well as new seat patterns. The two-tone dashboard was replaced by a color-keyed unit with a new "American" emblem on the glove box door and a standard fuel economy gauge. Cars equipped with an automatic transmission included a heater and power steering at no extra cost.

===== 1976 =====
The 1976 models were almost the same as their immediate predecessors; their differences were limited to a compression ratio increase for the 258 cu in (4.2 L) I6 from 7.6:1 to 8.0:1. New gauges appeared in the form of a 160 km/h speedometer and revised warning lights, sun visors were redesigned to larger more rectangular units with side bending portions, a new more-ornate dome light lens, new seat, and door panel designs, while a rear defroster was added to the options. The separate seatbelt warning buzzer between the wiper and light knobs was discontinued. New full-rubber bumper guards became available alongside the already existing metal ones with rubber strips.

===== 1977 =====
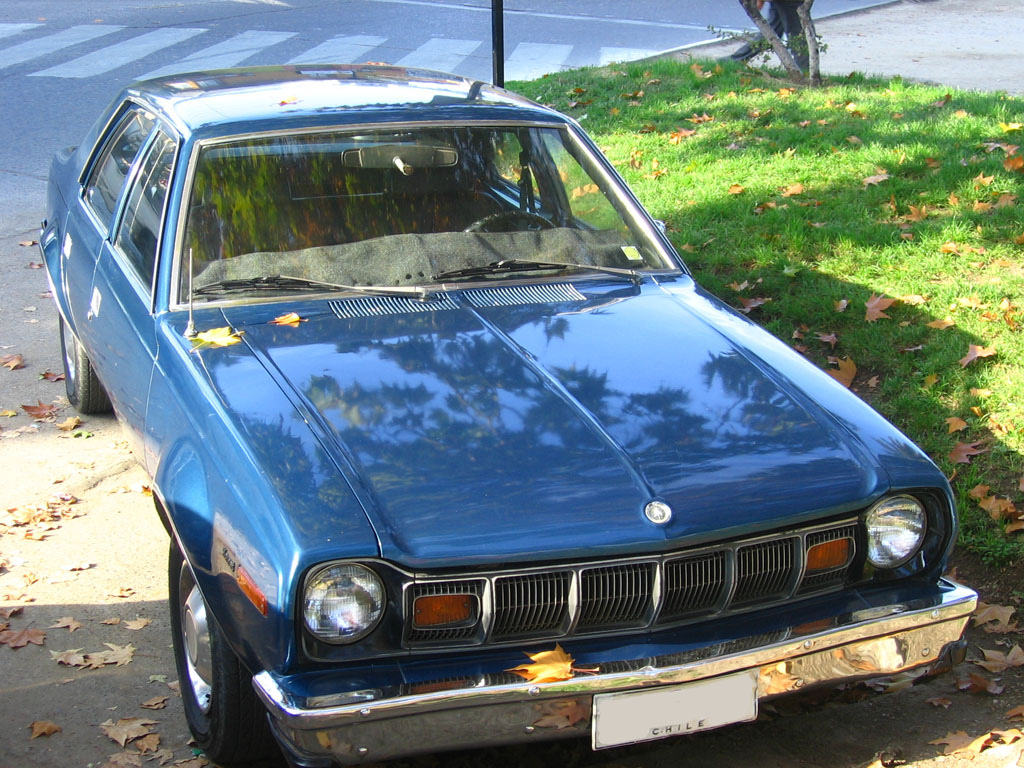
1977 four-door sedan, regular use in Chile (2011)

The 1977 models included a facelift that AMC originally intended to be exclusive to the Gremlin line. The design included a new front bumper, squared headlight bezels with rounded corners, and an egg-crate smile-shaped grille that incorporated the rectangular parking lights from the previous two years. An "American" emblem was mounted on the right front edge of the hood. The two-point seatbelts were upgraded to fixed three-point units on both sedan models. Station wagons included three-point retractable units as standard. The Carter RBS carburetor was discontinued, leaving the YF model on the 258 cu in (4.2 L) I6.

Two-door sedans with manual transmissions now featured a floor-mounted gearshift and low-back, fold-down individual seats. In contrast, models with automatic transmissions retained a bench seat with split-folding backs and a column-mounted shifter. Manual transmission cars incorporated a safety lock lever in their steering column ignition switch, shared with the American Rally model. The seats and door panels were slightly modified from the previous year. A new "American" emblem with different typography was applied to the glove box door. The "258" rear-quarter-panel emblems were replaced with new "4.2" versions. Although VAM introduced a factory-installed air conditioning system for its 1977 model year cars, it was not available for the American series. The objective was to offer it in high-trim and performance models. However, VAM dealerships could install a universal air conditioning system for non-factory-built units.

==== Rambler American Rally ====
The sports-oriented Rambler American Rally package was originally introduced in 1969 for the third-generation Rambler American two-door sedan as a more economical, sporty alternative to the muscular VAM Javelin and the personal-luxury VAM Rambler Classic SST (Rebel SST hardtop). With the arrival of the new Hornet-based models for 1970, the package was continued and improved, featuring not only more standard production accessories but also all-new exclusive ones. The Rambler American Rally model was available a full year before AMC's Hornet SC/360 and two years before the Hornet X and Hornet Rallye-X models, making it the first-ever performance product based on the Hornet.

The package started with an exclusive engine designed by VAM, the high-performance 232 cu in (3.8 L) I6 rated at 160 hp (119 kW; 162 PS) featuring a 9.8:1 a compression ratio, a Carter WCD carburetor, and a 266-degree camshaft. This package included a black two-spoke sports steering wheel with a central bullseye emblem, wide reclining individual front seats, and a floor-mounted Hurst Performance shifter for the 150-T three-speed manual transmission. A locking mechanism for the shifter connected to the steering wheel ignition switch. Other features included a bright molding package, a rear panel overlay between the taillights, and two courtesy lights. Unlike the 1969 version, power drum brakes were no longer standard; they were optional.

The Rambler American Rally for 1971 was almost equal to the previous year. The new script "Rally" emblems replaced the "American" fender emblems to differentiate the 1971 models from the 1970 models. The front seat controls were revised with a new knob placed on the outer side of each seatback, new "mushroom"-shaped armrests with a central horizontal bright molding, new side panels with simulated stitches, and a steering wheel design similar to the previous one but incorporating three false spokes per arm instead of the smooth soft surface. A new AM monaural radio model replaced the previous unit used since 1966 in Rambler American and Classic models.

The success of the Rally package led VAM to use it as a trim level for 1972, along with improvements. The safety mechanism connecting the shifter to the ignition switch was discontinued and replaced with a small safety lever on the side of the column to prevent the ignition switch from accidentally turning to the lock position while the vehicle is still in motion. The previously optional 8000 RPM tachometer became standard equipment along with AMC's new three-arm three-spoke sports steering wheel with a round center horn button. Low-back, smaller, more bucket-like front reclining seats replaced the wide units of the previous two years, creating a free space between the units over the transmission tunnel. The round floor-shift base shared with 1968–1969 Javelins was replaced by a new square design. The bright rear panel received an aluminum-look finish, and the taillight lenses featured a new, larger backup light and side stripes. The grille was changed from aluminum to plastic, and an updated hood latch appeared. The front sway bar became standard. The 1972 Rally engine was the VAM 252 cu in (4.1 L) I6 producing 170 hp (127 kW; 172 PS) at 4,600 rpm, 9.5:1 compression ratio and the 266-degree camshaft, which was originally used in 1969 and 1970 VAM Javelins, as well as 1970 and 1971 Rambler Classics (Rebel and Matador). Unlike the exclusive high-performance version of the 1970-1971 232 Rally engine, the 252 six was a regular production unit. The only exception to this was the exclusive high-flow version of the Carter RBS single-barrel carburetor, named Carter RBS-PV1, developed by VAM's engineers. The "232 SIX" emblems were replaced with "252" design.

For 1973, VAM sought to standardize and consolidate as many parts and components to cut costs. Both the 232 and 252 engine series were discontinued in favor of the higher-output 170 hp (127 kW; 172 PS) 258 cu in (4.2 L) I6 as the standard models. The engine now shared the same crankshaft as VAM's new 282 cu in (4.6 L) I6 was introduced in the 1971 VAM Javelin. The larger-displacement engine featured unique head and exhaust porting designs with larger intake and exhaust valves, along with dished pistons with a 3.909 in (99.3 mm) bore and 3.894 in (98.9 mm) stroke. The increase in displacement was achieved by a 0.06 in (1.5 mm) larger bore than the 258 I6. The rear differential gear ratio changed from 3.54:1 to 3.31:1. The taillights were revised. High-back bucket seats were available, shared with the second-generation VAM Javelin. Unlike previous seat backs, these did not include a reclining mechanism. New side panel designs were accompanied by a now standard parcel shelf incorporating both courtesy lights. The front end was updated as in the standard Rambler American models, except for the blackout grille. The engine displacement emblems changed the last digit to eight while keeping the same design as last year's units. The rectangular "Rambler" rear emblem was removed and its place was taken by the manuscript "Rally" unit that was no longer on the front fenders.

The 1974 Rallys were mostly unchanged from the 1973s. Just like on the Rambler American, their largest difference was the new rear five-mile-per-hour bumper and relocated rear license plate. These models incorporated the first design of VAM's original five-spoke wheels, which carried full volcano-shaped hubcaps and trim rings. Wheel covers were not available for this model. For the first time, a set of factory-side stripes adorned the model's exterior, including a manuscript "Rally" emblem on the rear quarter panel, creating a two-tone appearance. The front seats were the same as the year before and were now also shared with the brand-new Classic AMX (Matador X) model. The discontinuation of the original VAM logo in 1973 in favor of the new arrow-type logo meant its removal from the tachometer dial. The shifter was changed into a T-shaped Hurst unit. A new AMC logo on a black background replaced the American Motors script on the transparent acrylic cap of the steering wheel's horn button. The compression ratio of the 258 cu in (4.2 L) engines was reduced from 8.5:1 to 8.3:1.

==== American Rally ====
The new marketing approach for VAM's compact model was also included, changing the name from Rambler American Rally to American Rally. For the first time, VAM sought to reposition the model higher, moving it away from the economical, sporty model status it pioneered, and incorporating luxury features.

The 1975 American Rally, with its new name, received its first redesign of identity emblems, featuring an all-new "RALLY" nameplate in printed letters connected by a background line. Like the former one, it was located on the rear panel between the right taillight and the rear license plate. A new grille, headlight bezels, and parking lights shared with the American and Gremlin lines were now in blackout form. New side decals were discreet lines running the full length of the car, without altering proportions, and incorporated Rally emblems on the front fenders. The interior, for the first time, differed from that of the American model, except for the front seats. Rally emblems appeared etched on the front high corners of the side panels. All previously exposed metal parts, such as the door tops, rear sides, and B-pillar, were now upholstered in vinyl. The "RAMBLER" emblem on the glove box was replaced by a "RALLY" one of the same design. Unlike all of its predecessors, a considerable number of 1975 American Rally units were equipped with the heater as standard. The aspect that made the American Rally the most different from the last generation was the engines. The 258 cu in (4.2 L) I6 came with an all-new Prestolite electronic ignition system. Manual front disk brakes replaced the previous drums. A new TREMEC 170-F four-speed manual transmission with Hurst linkage was available from the factory. However, VAM was unable to standardize it fully, and several Hurst-linked three-speed 1975 American Rally versions were built.

Since 1973, the growing problem of air pollution (especially in Mexico City) forced the Mexican government to begin emission certification of all engines produced in the country starting in 1974. This would affect all high-compression engines of all marques. For this reason, the 258 cu in (4.2 L) I6 had dropped from an 8.5:1 to 8.3:1 compression compression between 1973 and 1974. However, this change was not enough to comply with government standards, and VAM was forced to further reduce compression in mid-1974. This meant a 7.6:1 compression ratio for the 258 cu in (4.2 L) I6 for the second half of the year production of the 1974 Rambler American Rally. For this reason, this model, along with the 1975 American Rally, became the lowest-performing examples of VAM's original compact sporty model, ending even below the standard 155 hp (116 kW; 157 PS) 232 cu in (3.8 L) I6 of the 1969 Rambler American Rally and the stock 232 1970–1972 Rambler American two-door sedans. Improvements in the form of the four-speed transmission and electronic ignition were insufficient.

In 1976, VAM introduced the Gremlin X in Mexico, retaking the economical sporty concept originally held by the Rally model. Engineers improved the output of the 258 cu in (4.2 L) I6 without increasing gas emissions by adopting a higher 8.0:1 compression ratio. This, along with the subcompact's lighter body, made the 1976 Gremlin X outperform the low-compression 1975 American Rally even though it was not offered with the new four-speed transmission. To avoid internal competition between the performance models and further push the line's concept change, VAM upgraded the American Rally to differentiate it from the new subcompact model. The 1976 models switched to the 200 hp (149 kW; 203 PS) 7.7:1 compression ratio VAM 282 cu in (4.6 L) I6 with Holley 2300 two-barrel carburetor and 266-degree camshaft, shared with the VAM Pacer and all Classic models. This marked for the first time the presence of VAM's largest engine in the Hornet-based compact line. Changes to the 258 six were still in process for the 282 as well, so the existing version was continued. The 1976 American Rally had improved performance with its higher displacement, large-diameter valves, larger intake manifold, and larger carburetor. The model outperformed its predecessors except for the 1972 Rambler American Rally with its 9.5:1 compression ratio 252 cu in (4.1 L) I6, which was still half a second faster despite its high-flow one-barrel carburetor, small intake manifold, three-speed transmission, higher numerical rear gear ratio, and lower displacement.

Additionally, the 1976 American Rally included improvements such as power front disc brakes, power steering, and a tinted windshield as standard equipment. The four-speed transmission and heater were also standard. New seat patterns and door panel designs (without the etched Rally emblem) were used, while gauges were changed to a 160 km/h speedometer and a 6,000 RPM tachometer. New dome light lens design and longer sun visors were shared with the American and Gremlin. The new engine and standard equipment, coupled with the mid-year discontinuation of the 1976 Classic AMX (Matador X), made the American Rally the company's top-of-the-line performance model. The sportiness and concept were fairly close to those of the 1972–1976 VAM Javelins and Classic AMXs. With the engine change, the rear quarter panel emblems morphed into "4.6" units. After only one year, the model name "Rally" emblem on the rear panel was redesigned again.

The 1977 models incorporated engineering upgrades for the 258 six the year before the 282 engine. All-new head design with quench-type combustion chambers raised the compression ratio from 7.7:1 to 8.0:1. It was accompanied by a new aluminum intake manifold with improved flow, while retaining the Holley 2300 two-barrel carburetor. These improvements made the 1977 American Rally the best-performing model of its series, even surpassing the high-compression 1972 model. Despite this, advertised horsepower and torque ratings were the same as the year before. The power increase enabled the use of a new 3.07:1 rear differential gear ratio for better fuel economy and top speed, without sacrificing acceleration or towing capacity. The front high-back bucket seats received new patterns, and for the first time since the 1972 reclining mechanism (as standard equipment), three-point front seatbelts with double retractable mechanisms were added. A new VAM-designed digital tachometer replaced the conventional analog unit in the midyear. The exterior featured the new Gremlin front clip. New decals covering only the topsides of the front fenders started near the doors, at the side marker lights. Between the lights and the stripe was a "Rally 4.6" sticker. Like the three luxury versions of the line for the year, the 1977 American Rally was the first unit of its series to offer the original factory air conditioning system as an option. The hood and trunk lights, as well as the glove box unit, were added to the standard equipment list.

The Rally included D70x14 radial tires in all years and rear gear ratios of 3.54:1 (1970–1972), 3.31:1 (1973–1976), and 3.07:1 (1977). The American Rally was discontinued in 1977 along with all other Hornet-based VAM Americans. It would be succeeded by the 1978 American Rally AMX model (VAM's version of the 1978 AMC Concord AMX), marking the first time AMC produced its hatchback coupe body style in Mexico. Unlike the AMC Hornet X models, neither the Hornet-based Rambler American Rally nor the American Rally was ever available with V8 engines, automatic transmissions, or column-mounted shifters. The Rally model was more than just an appearance package, but it was also not as strong as a muscle car. Its closest American equivalent is the 1972 Hornet Rallye-X model. It is regarded as one of VAM's most collectible models.

==== American ECD ====
As part of the shift in market strategy for VAM's Hornet-based compacts for 1975 that included advancements in the American base model and American Rally, the introduction of the new American ECD or "Edición Cantos Dorados" (English: Golden Edges Edition). It represented for the first time that a VAM four-door compact was not an economy base model. The American ECD was VAM's first regular-production luxury compact, following the two-door hardtops of 1963 and 1965, which were marketed as the Rambler American Hardtop (equivalent to the Rambler American 440H in the U.S. and Canada). The ECD was restricted to the four-door sedan, while the 1975 American Rally was the high-trim two-door sedan. The station wagon remained a single-edition model. The American ECD was equivalent in the U.S. to the 1975 four-door Hornet DL model.

The 1975 American ECD came standard with a 170 hp (127 kW; 172 PS) 258 cu in (4.2 L) I6 engine with a single-barrel Carter carburetor, an electronic ignition, a 266-degree camshaft, and a 7.6:1 compression ratio with a regular cooling system. Included were manual front disk brakes with rear drums, power steering, heavy-duty suspension with front sway bar, Chrysler TorqueFlite A904 three-speed automatic transmission, and a 3.31:1 rear gear ratio. The exterior included a full vinyl roof with bright moldings, standard bright molding package (wheel lip, rocker panels, drip rails, and between taillights molding), luxury wheel covers, "American" and "Automático" emblems on the rear panel, "258" emblems on rear quarter panels, and golden "ECD" emblems over the base of the C-pillars. Standard equipment also consisted of front and rear bench seats, front two-point seatbelts, front and rear armrests, luxury upholstery, custom steering wheel, column-mounted shifter, color-keyed padded dashboard, gauges for fuel and coolant temperature as well as warning lights (brakes, oil, and electrical system), a 200 km/h speedometer, vacuum gauge, front ashtray, cigarette lighter, heater with front defroster, AM monaural radio with a single speaker and antenna, locking glove box, parcel shelf, courtesy lights, padded sun visors, day/night rearview mirror, heat and sound insulating cardboard-type headliner, round dome light, dual coat hooks, rear ashtray mounted on the front seatback, and driver's side remote mirror. Optional equipment included passenger's side mirror, remote-controlled driver's side mirror, power brakes, bumper guards, tinted windshield, light group, and others.

The 1976 American ECD included the same upgrades as the rest of the American line. These were longer sun visors, a 160 km/h speedometer, a new dome light lens, and a higher 8.0:1 compression ratio on the 258 six. A rear defroster was added to the options list while the tinted windshield became standard. The luxury seat patterns and wheel covers were redesigned. An electric analog clock appeared to the right of the speedometer, although several models kept the vacuum gauge. A new model for the year was the two-door American ECD. This model was a limited-edition luxury American two-door sedan comparable to the 1960s Rambler American hardtops. The equipment was the same as the four-door American ECD, with some differences. The engine on this model was the 200 hp (149 kW; 203 PS) 282 cu in (4.6 L) I6 featuring a Holley 2300 two-barrel carburetor, 7.7:1 compression ratio, 266-degree camshaft, and electronic ignition. The automatic transmission was a floor-mounted shift design, a first in a VAM Hornet-based American. The front seats were upgraded to high-back individual non-reclining units, replacing the four-door bench.

The American ECD was once again restricted to the four-door sedan only for 1977. The model incorporated the new Gremlin front clip, as did the rest of the American line for the year. New "4.2" units replaced the "258" engine displacement emblems, and the bumper guards were included at no charge. Power brakes were made standard. Most of the light group was also installed as standard, which added illumination for the engine, trunk, and glove box. The electric clock was fully standardized in all units. Front seat belts were upgraded to three-point retractable units. The rear seatback received a concealed fold-down armrest. AMC's factory air conditioning system was added to the options. The Carter RBS one-barrel carburetor was discontinued, leaving only the Carter YF model.

==== American GFS ====
The automaker sought to reposition the two-door 1976 American ECD from limited-edition status to regular production and to change consumer perception from general luxury to the personal luxury car segment, a category VAM no longer offered after the mid-1976 discontinuation of the Classic Brougham (Matador Brougham coupe) model. A group of employees planned to take advantage of the upcoming new model to pay homage to VAM's general manager, Gabriel Fernández Sáyago, one of the most respected in the Mexican auto industry at the time, and VAM's leader since 1946. The new personal luxury compact was named after him, using his initials as a designation. The model was presented to him as a surprise in late 1976, which he appreciated greatly, but, opting for a more humble stance, he requested that the model not bear his name. The employees respected his decision but managed to keep their original plan in place indirectly. The general manager's initials were retained, but the meaning was changed to "Grand Formula Sport." The model was introduced alongside VAM's 1977 lineup as a two-door alternative to the American ECD and a luxury alternative to the American Rally.

The 1977 American GFS incorporated the same appearance and equipment novelties as the American ECD of the same year. Like the two-door 1976 American ECD, the model retained the individual front seat and floor-mounted automatic transmission configuration, with the notable difference of standard reclining mechanisms. The 282 cu in (4.6 L) I6 incorporated new head and intake manifold designs as well as the 3.07:1 rear gear ratio from the American Rally model of that year. Unique to the 1977 American GFS was its design of rear side windows and roof. VAM designers created a half-landau-type vinyl-covered roof that included the over the roof targa band that AMC used for its 1977 Hornet AMX models and partially covered the flip-open rear side windows, creating a thicker B-pillar. American Motors adopted this design for its 1978 and 1979 Concord DL/Limited two-door models, but without the targa trim.

==== Camioneta Automática ====
New for 1977 was VAM's first station wagon that was not an economy-based model, the first in 17 years. This was included with the optional automatic transmission. Like the American GFS, the engine changed from the 282 cu in (4.6 L) to the 282 cu in (4.6 L) I6 version with a 3.07:1 rear differential gear ratio. Like the American ECD, it shared the column-mounted gearshift, high-trimmed-upholstered bench seats (with a fold-down rear unit), and special door panels. Shared with both luxury sedans were power brakes, power steering, heavy-duty suspension, bumper guards, full bright molding package, luxury wheel covers, "4.6" emblems (GFS only), tinted windshield, luxury steering wheel, electric analog clock, parcel shelf, full light group (except reading dome light), as well as other updates for the model year. This introduced a luxury wagon to VAM's lineup for the first time. However, the low-priced base wagon was no longer available with an automatic transmission. VAM wagons with this package did not have a name because it was not a trim level, but VAM and printed materials described it as the "Camioneta Automática" (automatic wagon). Starting in 1979, and based on the U.S. market Concord station wagon, it was now named "American DL".

=== South Africa ===
South Africa was the first international market that AMC entered the right-hand drive production of the Hornet. Before the Hornet, the Rambler American was assembled in South Africa first by National Motor Assemblers Limited (NMA) in Durban and in 1968 at the Datsun assembly facility, Rosslyn Motor Assemblers. In 1969 Rambler production was moved to the former Chrysler plant, Motor Assemblies Limited (MA) in Durban, which had come under the control of Toyota South Africa Motors in 1964.

Motor Assemblies Limited built the American for its final year and in 1970 was its replacement the AMC Hornet four-door sedan. The initial design and engineering work to right-hand drive conversion for South Africa became the blueprints used right-hand drive Hornets that were assembled in Australia. As with all AMC's export markets, the Hornet was marketed in South Africa as "Rambler."

The Rambler Hornet was advertised as being "built and marketed in South Africa by Toyota South Africa Ltd, wholly owned and controlled by South Africans ... sold and serviced country-wide by 220 Toyota dealers." The Hornet was marketed through 1971.

American Motors South Africa (Proprietary) Limited was the official license holder for the production of the Rambler Hornet at the Motor Assemblies plant. However, latter production was hampered by problems arising from regulations. The nation's tariff structure considered only the weight of parts or materials made in South Africa would be calculated toward local content requirements. The objective was to increase indigenous production. As a result, the last of the South African-built Rambler Hornets came equipped with 4.1 L (250 cu in) Chevrolet straight-6 engines. The objective was to standardize the manufacture of vehicle components within South Africa. Because of this, the Hornet's original AMC engine was eliminated from the marketplace, while the switch also provided greater local production volume for the General Motors engine.

A total of 840 Hornets were built at the Motor Assemblies plant.

== Motorsports ==
AMC Hornets were campaigned in various motorsports events. Some technical and financial support was provided by the automaker in the early years.

=== Stock car racing ===
Bobby Allison was AMC's factory-backed NASCAR driver, racing #12 AMC Matadors fielded by Roger Penske. Allison also participated in short-track racing, often using a modified stock car that he re-bodied using the Hornet's sheet metal, painted in the AMC's red/white/blue racing livery and numbered 12.

=== Drag racing ===
Hornets were campaigned on dragstrips from 1972 and became well known by their bold red, white, and blue graphics. Dave Street was an early Hornet racer in Northeast Pro Stock events. Drivers on the Pro Stock circuit included Wally Booth (backed by AMC until 1974), as well as Rich Maskin and Dave Kanners captured top awards. Booth drove a Hornet to the top qualifying spot at the 1975 NHRA U.S. Nationals.

Some drivers converted from AMC Gremlins when tests with identical engines in 1973 showed that the hatchback Hornet had an advantage with higher speeds and lower times. The 1974 Gatornationals, as well as the 1976 NHRA U.S. Nationals and the World Finals were won by Wally Booth driving an AMC Hornet. The Hornets would do the quarter-mile in 8 seconds reaching 150 mph (241 km/h).

The last AMC Pro Stocker was campaigned through the 1982 season in American Hot Rod Association events. It was a Hornet AMX with nitrous injection.

=== Endurance ===
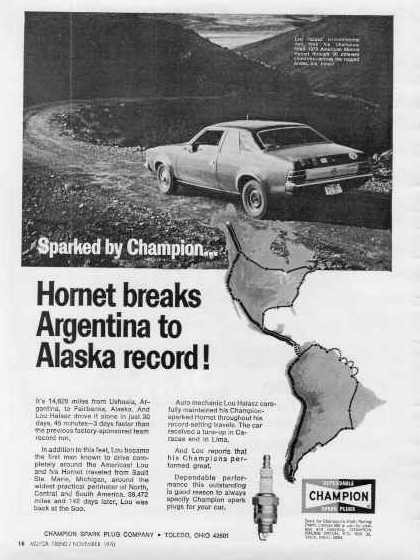
Champion spark plug ad with endurance record AMC Hornet

In 1970, Lou Haratz drove an AMC Hornet over 14,000 miles (22,531 km) to set a new Trans-Americas record by going from Ushuaia, Argentina to Fairbanks, Alaska in 30 days and 45 minutes. He also went on to be the first to drive completely around the widest practical perimeter of the North, Central, and South American continents for a distance of 38,472 miles (61,915 km) in 143 days. The Hornet received a tune-up service in Caracas as well as in Lima, and the endurance record was promoted in various popular magazine advertisements for Champion spark plugs that were standard equipment in AMC engines.

=== IMSA racing ===
From 1971 the AMC Hornet was campaigned in the International Motor Sports Association (IMSA) races. Hornets ran in GTO class (Grand Touring type with engines of 2.5 L or more) and American Challenge (AC) class. American Motors provided only limited support in the form of technical help. The cars were gutted and powered by highly modified AMC 232 straight-six engines.

In 1973, AMC cars very nearly placed 1-2-3, in a BF Goodrich Radial Challenge Series race, but Bob Hennig driving an AMC Hornet went out while in third place with only six laps to go. BMW driver Nick Craw and AMC Hornet driver Amos Johnson ended the IMSA series as co-champions in Class B.

On 6 February 1977, out of 57 cars that started the 24-Hours of Daytona, Championship of Makes, at Daytona International Speedway, an AMC Hornet driven by Tom Waugh, John Rulon-Miller, and Bob Punch drove car #15 to 22nd place overall and 12th in the GTO class by completing 394 laps going 1,582 miles (2,546 km).

Amos Johnson drove car #7, an AC Class Hornet, in the 100-mile Road Atlanta race on 17 April 1977, as well as with co-driver Dennis Shaw to finish 11th in the Hallett Motor Racing Circuit on 24 July 1977.

A 1977 Hornet AMX was prepared by "Team Highball" from North Carolina and driven by Amos Johnson and Dennis Shaw. Car #77 finished in 34th place in the GTO class out of the 68 that started the race by completing 475 laps, 1,824 miles (2,935 km) in the 17th Annual 24 Hours of Daytona Camel GT Challenge.

The AMC cars "were killers at places like Daytona. Despite being about as aerodynamic as a brick they had those nice, big, reliable straight sixes ..."

=== SCCA Trans Am ===
Buzz Dyer drove a 1977 AMC Hornet AMX (car #77) with a V8 engine in the Sports Car Club of America (SCCA) Trans Am events at the Laguna Seca Raceway on 8 October 1978 and finished 46 laps.

=== Coast-to-coast run ===
Two Hot Rod staffers, John Fuchs and Clyde Baker, entered a 1972 AMC Hornet in the Cannonball Baker Sea-to-Shining-Sea Memorial Trophy Dash. This was an unofficial automobile race from New York City and Darien, CT, on the U.S. Atlantic coast, to Redondo Beach, a Los Angeles suburb on the Pacific coast during the time of the newly imposed 55 mph (89 km/h) speed limit set by the National Maximum Speed Law. The Hornet X hatchback was modified with a 401 cu in (6.6 L) AMC V8 and auxiliary racing fuel cells to increase gasoline capacity. They finished in 13th place after driving for 41 hours and 15 minutes at an average speed of 70.4 mph (113 km/h).

== In popular culture ==
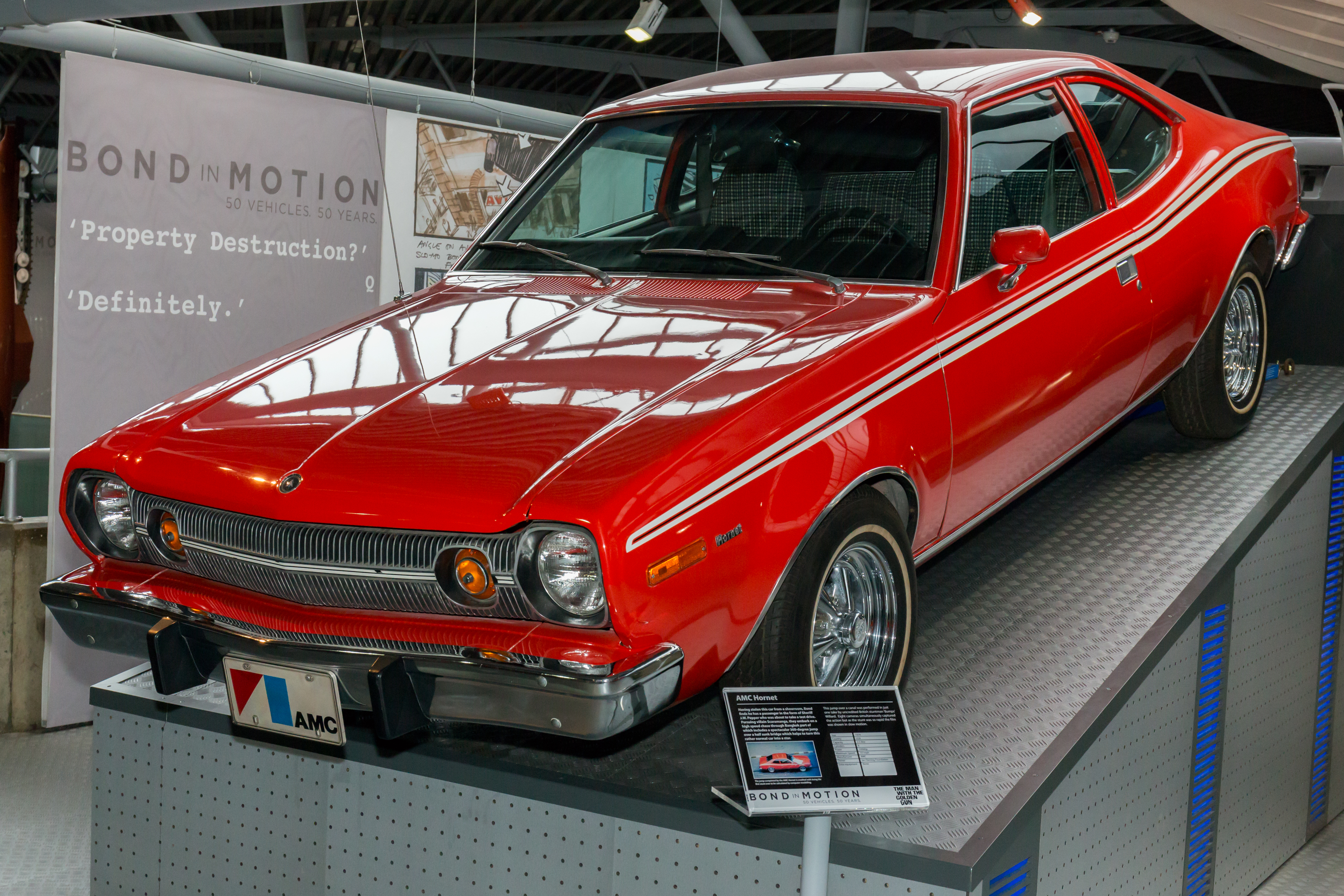
The 1974 Hornet X Hatchback featured in The Man with the Golden Gun on display at the National Motor Museum, Beaulieu

As part of a significant product placement movie appearance by AMC, a 1974 Hornet X Hatchback is featured in the James Bond film: The Man with the Golden Gun, where Roger Moore made his second appearance as the British secret agent.

The film's "most outrageous sequence" begins with Sheriff J.W. Pepper, who, on holiday in Thailand with his wife, is admiring a new, red AMC Hornet in a Bangkok showroom. He is about to test drive the car. The action begins as James Bond commandeers the Hornet from the dealership with Pepper in it for a car chase. The Hornet performs an "airborne pirouette as it makes a hold-your-breath jump across a broken bridge".

The stunt car is significantly modified with a redesigned chassis to place the steering wheel in the center and a lower stance, as well as larger wheel wells, compared to the stock Hornet used in all the other movie shots. The 360-degree mid-air twisting corkscrew was captured in just one filming sequence. Seven tests were performed in advance before the one jump performed by an uncredited British stuntman "Bumps" Williard for the film with six (or eight, depending on the source) cameras simultaneously rolling. Two frogmen were positioned in the water, as well as an emergency vehicle and a crane were ready, but not needed. The Cornell Aeronautical Laboratory (CAL) was used for computer modeling to calculate the stunt. The modeling called for a 1,460.06 kg (3,219 lb) weight of both the car and driver, the exact angles of the ramps, and the 15.86-metre (52 ft) distance between the ramps, as well as the 64.36-kilometre-per-hour (40 mph) launch speed.

This stunt was adapted from Jay Milligan's Astro Spiral Javelin show cars. These were jumps performed in AMC-sponsored thrill shows at fairs around the United States, including the Houston Astrodome, where Gremlins and Hornets were also used to drive around in circles on their side two wheels in the arena. Using exactly the same ramp design, movie set designers made the ramps look convincingly like a rickety old bridge that was falling apart. However, the movie's director ruined the continuous spiral effect of the stunt. By cutting camera shots as the car was in mid-air, they made it look like trick photography to get the car upside-down rather than filming it as one continuous jump.

Months of difficult work went into the scene that lasts only fifteen seconds in the movie. The Guinness World Records 2010 book describes this "revolutionary jump" as the "first astro spiral used in a movie" and lists it as third among the top ten James Bond film stunts.

The actual Bond Hornet was preserved in the National Motor Museum in Beaulieu, UK together with other famous items owned by the Ian Fleming Foundation and used in the 007 films. In 2017, the car stunt car "in operable and in as-jumped condition" was auctioned by the museum.

The AMC Hornet is one of Hagerty's favorite Bond cars for vintage automobile collectors on a budget. Several scale models of the AMC Hornet are available including the James Bond hatchback versions made by Corgi Toys and Johnny Lightning.

== Experimental Hornets ==
The AMC Hornet served as a vehicle for several experimental alternative fuel and power sources.

=== Gas turbine ===
In the aftermath of the Clean Air Act Amendments of 1970, research grants were funded by the U.S. government to further develop automotive gas turbine technology. This included conceptual design studies and vehicles for improved passenger-car gas-turbine systems that were conducted by Chrysler, General Motors (through its Detroit Diesel Allison Division), Ford in collaboration with AiResearch, and Williams Research teamed with American Motors. In 1971, a long-term test was conducted to evaluate actual road experience with a turbine-powered passenger car. An AMC Hornet was converted to a WR-26 regenerative gas turbine power made by Williams International.

A small-sized Williams gas turbine engine powered 1973 Hornet was used by New York City to evaluate comparable cost efficiency with piston engines and funded by a grant from the National Air Pollution Control Administration, a predecessor of the United States Environmental Protection Agency (EPA). The city was interested in "solving the air quality problems that New Yorkers were beginning to notice." The Hornet's experimental power source was developed by inventor Sam B. Williams. Weighing in at 250 lb (113 kg) and measuring 26 by 24 in (660 by 610 mm) and 16 in (406 mm) high, it produced 80 hp (60 kW; 81 PS) at 4450 rpm with a clean exhaust. The engines performed well in theory and ran well, especially during tests on the Michigan International Speedway, but the cars needed more work to be adapted to the turbine engine for city driving and lacked the refinement of the purpose-built Chrysler Turbine Car.

=== Gasoline direct injection ===
Research to develop a Straticharge Continuous Fuel-Injection (SCFI) system (an early gasoline direct injection (GDI) design) was conducted with the backing of AMC. The Hornet's conventional spark-ignited internal combustion I6 engine was a modified with a redesigned cylinder head. Road testing was performed using a 1973 AMC Hornet. This SCFI system was a mechanical device that automatically responded to the engine's airflow and loading conditions with two separate fuel-control pressures supplied to two sets of continuous-flow injectors. It was "a dual-chamber, three-valve, fuel-injected, stratified-charge" engine. Flexibility was designed into the SCFI system for trimming it to a particular engine.

=== Hybrid ===
In 1976, the California Air Resources Board bought and converted AMC Hornets for its design research into hybrids.

=== Natural gas ===
The Consumers Gas Company (now Consumers Energy) operated a fleet of 1970 AMC Hornets converted to a dual-fuel system that was capable of using gasoline as well as compressed natural gas (CNG). This was an early demonstration project for clean and efficient vehicles.

=== Plug-in electric ===
In 1971, the Electric Fuel Propulsion Company began marketing the Electrosport, a plug-in electric vehicle (PEV) based on the Hornet Sportabout wagon. It was designed to be a supplementary battery electric vehicle for commuting or daily chores, and to be recharged at home using household current or at "Charge Stations away from home to replenish power in 45 minutes, while you shop or have lunch."

=== LaForce Ventur-E ===
The United States Environmental Protection Agency (EPA) conducted extensive tests of 1974 and 1975 AMC Hornets to evaluate the fuel economy claims made for the LaForce Ventur-E modifications. The LaForce prepared Hornet included a special carburetor that was designed to vary the fuel to air mixture under all operating conditions. Other modifications were made to the camshaft, a smaller combustion area, special "dual" exhaust manifolds, and the installation of solid valve lifters (in place of the standard hydraulic tappets). The manifold was designed to intercept gasoline between the carburetor and engine and "to use even the harder to burn heavy gasoline molecules" – thus, claiming mileage increases of 40 to 57%. However, the EPA tests did not fully support the performance and economy claims that were to be achieved by these modifications in comparison to standard factory tuned vehicles.

== Concept cars ==
The AMC Hornet platform served as the basis for evaluating design and styling ideas by AMC. In the late-2000s, the Hornet name was revived for a Dodge concept car.

=== Cowboy ===
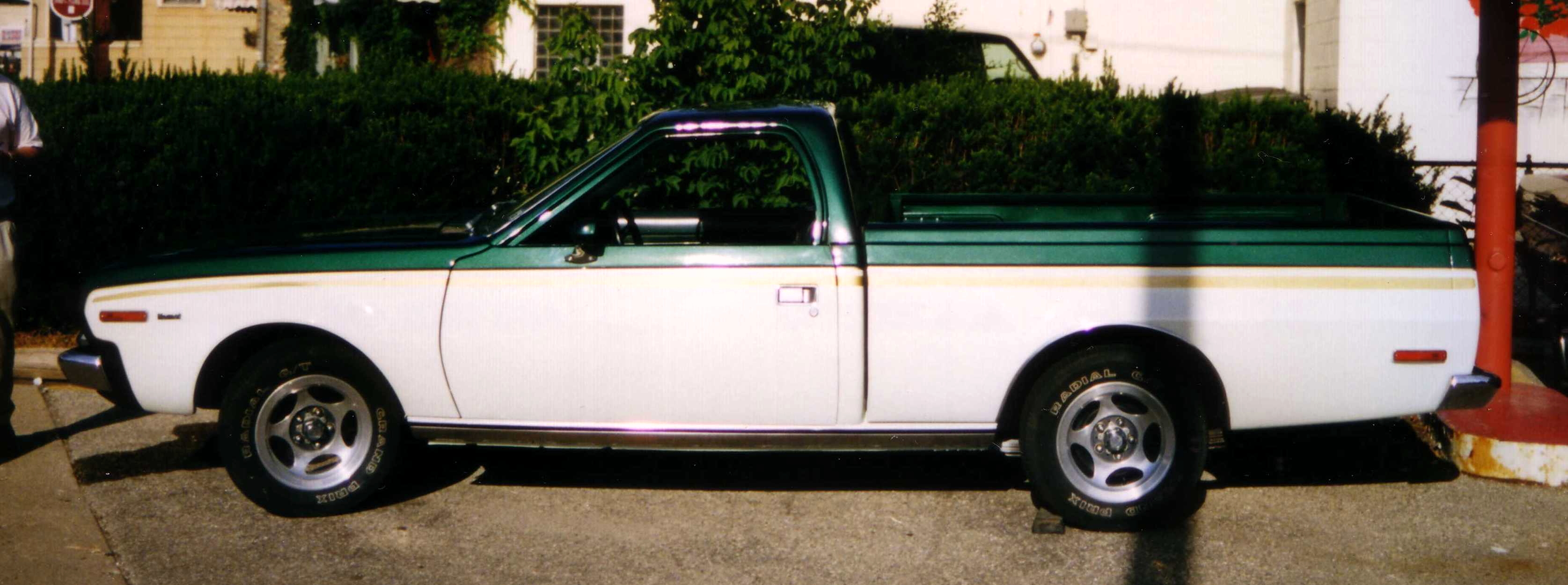
AMC Cowboy concept pickup truck

Although both predecessor companies (Nash and Hudson) had built work trucks, the merged successor (American Motors Corporation) never developed and marketed a truck line until it purchased Jeep. In the early 1970s, AMC was planning a compact coupé utility (pickup) based on the Hornet to compete with the increasing sales of Japanese compact pickup models.

Work began by having the Jeep styling studio convert a Hornet into a pickup with three objectives: to compete in size with the imported trucks, rival the Chevrolet El Camino in appearance, and have a lower cost than both of them. A further goal was to achieve the most return from AMC's $40 million investment in engineering and production dies needed to bring the sleek Hornet compact to market.

Prototypes called the Cowboy were developed under the leadership of Jim Alexander. The first proposal had an El Camino design with a "sweeping panel from the rear of the cab, flowing into and becoming the side of the truck bed." This would have been expensive to develop so Alexander, an AMC product planner, proposed a separate cargo bed mounted on a stub frame serving for the rear half of the unibody vehicle with a gas tank from an Ambassador welded under the front half of the cargo bed and the spare tire fitting under the back half.

Documentation from the development process indicates three prototypes with a Hornet-based cab, Jeep-style grille treatments, and a Gremlin version. The initial design called for a 6 feet (2 m) cargo box and the prototype used the front doors from a four-door Hornet. This short cab version was not effective and the cab was opened up by incorporating the longer two-door sedan doors along with a new upper window frame and a "K-pillar effect" that improved the design and for better sight lines. One prototype vehicle that was painted red featured a modified AMC Gremlin front design and a cargo box with a Jeep logo on the tailgate, but did not include a four-wheel-drive system. A prototype finished in green and white was made using a Hornet SC/360 that featured the 360 cu in (5.9 L) V8 engine with a floor-mounted manual transmission, radio, air conditioning, and a drop-down tailgate with no manufacturer's name stamped on it. The third prototype had a Gremlin front-end, was painted yellow, and had a 258 cu in (4.2 L) I6 engine. The basic AMC engines would be more powerful than the typical four-cylinder engines featured in the imported pickups.

American Motors was also developing a hatchback version of the Hornet. However, AMC's assembly plants in Kenosha and Milwaukee were already running at maximum capacity so the chosen body style would be built in Brampton, Ontario. With the increasing sales of the Hornet models, the 1970 acquisition of Jeep, and no 4WD option ready for the Cowboy (at the time all Jeeps were 4WD), AMC's product planners shelved the Cowboy truck program. A 4WD system was developed and later used on the 1980 AMC Eagle, and the "uniframe" construction ("frame" rails under the truck bed made of folded sheet metal and incorporated into the cab structure as one piece) was incorporated in the structure of the 1985 Jeep Comanche pickup, based on the unit body XJ Cherokee.

The only surviving prototype was built using a 1971 Hornet SC/360 with the 360 V8 and a four-speed manual transmission. The automaker used it on their proving grounds for several years before being sold to Alexander, who later installed a 1973 Hornet updated front-end.

=== Hornet GT ===
In 1973, the Hornet GT toured auto shows as an asymmetrical styling exercise. The left (or driver's) side featured more glass area and a narrower "C" pillar for better visibility in comparison to the concept car's different design on its right side. Using different designs on each side is common practice within automobile styling studios, especially when money was tight; however, showing such an example to the public was unusual and AMC was not afraid to measure consumer reaction to new ideas. Other design elements and ideas presented on the Hornet GT show car included sealed glass to allowing hollow doors that could house easily accessible components while freeing up space in the dashboard area, as well as a stronger roof and support pillars providing additional crash and rollover protection.

=== Hornet by Dodge ===
A mini-sized front-wheel-drive, concept car called Hornet was designed and developed by Dodge in 2006 for possible production in 2008 as the brand was entering European markets and attracting younger customers. As the price of fuel increased, Chrysler continued work to launch the Hornet in 2010 in Europe, the United States and other markets. This Hornet project may have been cancelled as part of Fiat's partnership with Chrysler; but it was also rumored that the Hornet nameplate would instead be applied to a small Dodge sedan slated for introduction in 2012 based on the same "C-Evo" platform as the Alfa Romeo Giulietta.

In October 2011, Chrysler trademarked four names: Hornet, Dart, Duster, and Camber. One month later, the head of the Dodge brand, Reid Bigland, stated that Hornet would not be used for the new car. The automaker "surprised industry pundits and insiders" with an announcement that the small sedan for 2013 will be called the Dodge Dart (PF). For a long time, both company insiders and industry experts "had insisted that the compact Dodge would be called the Dodge Hornet, in homage not only to the well-received 2006 concept car that carried the name but also to an ancestry of vehicles stretching back 60 years to the original Hudson Hornet."

=== Dodge Hornet ===
For the 2023 model year, Dodge revived the Hornet nameplate by introducing a compact crossover car. The historic name uses the same platform as the Alfa Romeo Tonale, but the Dodge version targets the performance market segment. The Dodge Hornet builds on the Hudson Hornet, the AMC Hornet, and the Hornet by Dodge concept car image to focus the new Hornet as part of the "Brotherhood of Muscle" marketing.
