= AMC AMX =

Two-seat sports car produced by American Motors Corporation

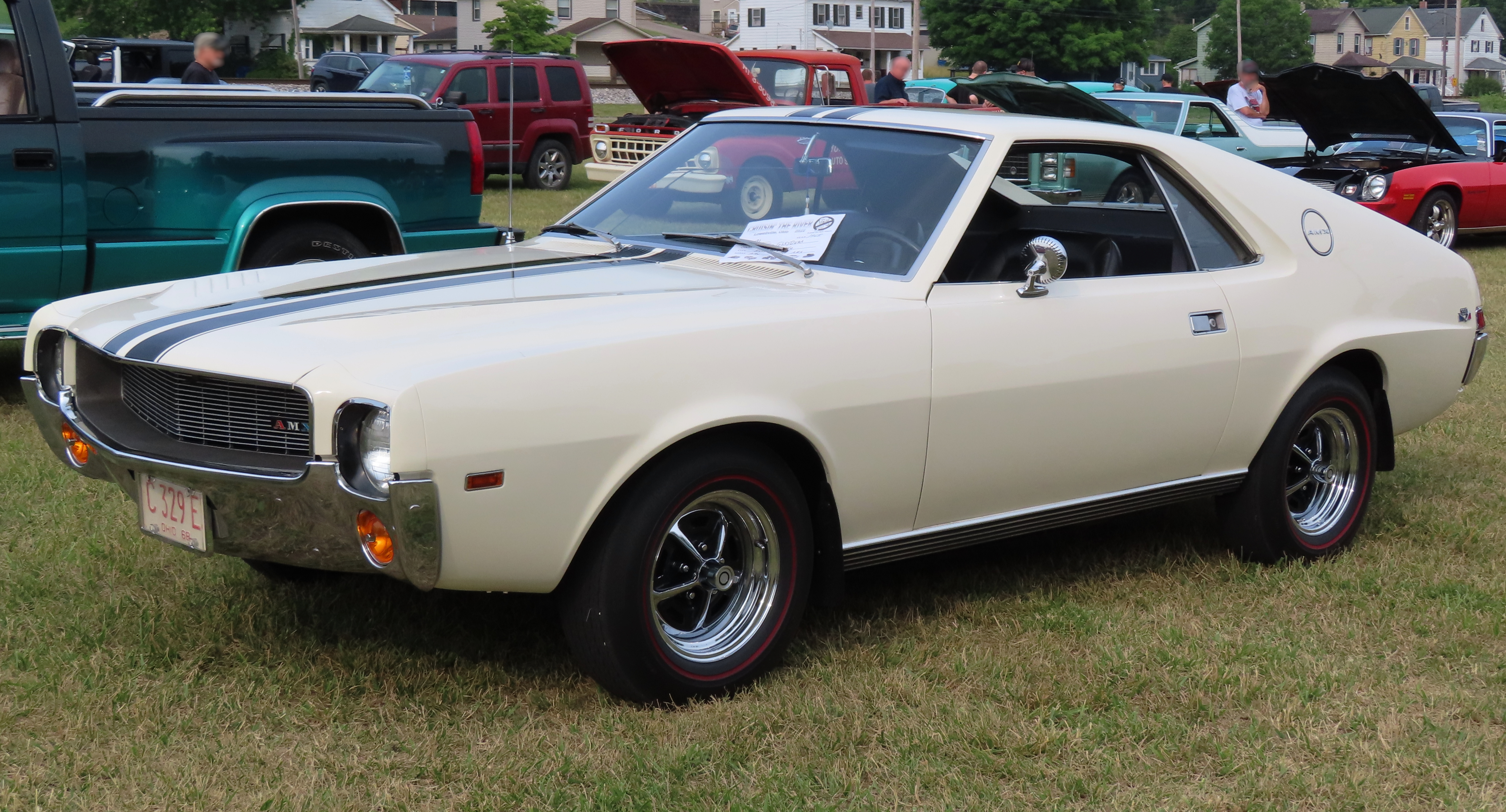
- 1968 AMX with "Go-Package"

Overview
- Manufacturer: American Motors Corporation (AMC)
- Also called: Rambler AMX (Australia)
- Production: 1968–1970
- Assembly: United States: Kenosha, Wisconsin; Australia: Port Melbourne (AMI)
- Designer: Dick Teague

Body and chassis
- Class: Grand tourer, Muscle car, Sports car
- Body style: 2-door coupe
- Layout: FR layout
- Platform: AMC's "junior cars"

Powertrain
- Engine: 290 cu in (4.8 L) 4-bbl V8 225 hp (168 kW; 228 PS) 1968–69; 343 cu in (5.6 L) 4-bbl V8 280 hp (209 kW; 284 PS) 1968–69; 360 cu in (5.9 L) 4-bbl V8 285 hp (213 kW; 289 PS) 1970; 390 cu in (6.4 L) 4-bbl V8 315 hp (235 kW; 319 PS) 1968–69; 390 cu in (6.4 L) twin 4-bbl V8 340 hp (254 kW; 345 PS) 1969 SS (only); 390 cu in (6.4 L) 4-bbl V8 325 hp (242 kW; 330 PS) 1970
- Transmission: 4-speed manual floor shift (standard); 3-speed "Shift-Command" automatic on console

Dimensions
- Wheelbase: 97 in (2,464 mm)
- Length: 1968–69: 177 in (4,496 mm); 1970: 179 in (4,547 mm)
- Width: 71 in (1,803 mm)
- Height: 51 in (1,295 mm)
- Curb weight: Approximate: 3,000 lb (1,361 kg)

Chronology
- Successor: AMC Javelin (second generation)

The AMC AMX is a two-seat GT-style muscle car produced by American Motors Corporation from 1968 through 1970. As one of just two American-built two-seaters, the AMX was in direct competition with the one-inch (2.5 cm) longer wheelbase Chevrolet Corvette, for substantially less money. It was based on the new-for-1968 Javelin, but with a shorter wheelbase and deletion of the rear seat. In addition, the AMX's rear quarter windows remained fixed, making it a coupe, while the Javelin was a true two-door hardtop.

Fitted with the standard high-compression 290 cu in (4.8 L) or optional 343 cu in (5.6 L) or 390 cu in (6.4 L) AMC V8 engine, the AMX offered sporty performance at an affordable price. Despite this value and enthusiastic initial reception by automotive media and enthusiasts, sales never thrived. However, the automaker's larger objectives to refocus AMC's image on performance and to bring younger customers into its dealer showrooms were achieved. After three model years, the two-seat version was discontinued.

The AMX's signature badging was transferred to a high-performance version of its four-seat sibling, the Javelin, from the 1971 to 1974 model years. American Motors capitalized on the respected reputation of the original two-seat AMXs by reviving the model designation for performance-equipped coupe versions of the compact Hornet in 1977, Concord in 1978, and the subcompact Spirit in 1979 and 1980.

== Origin ==
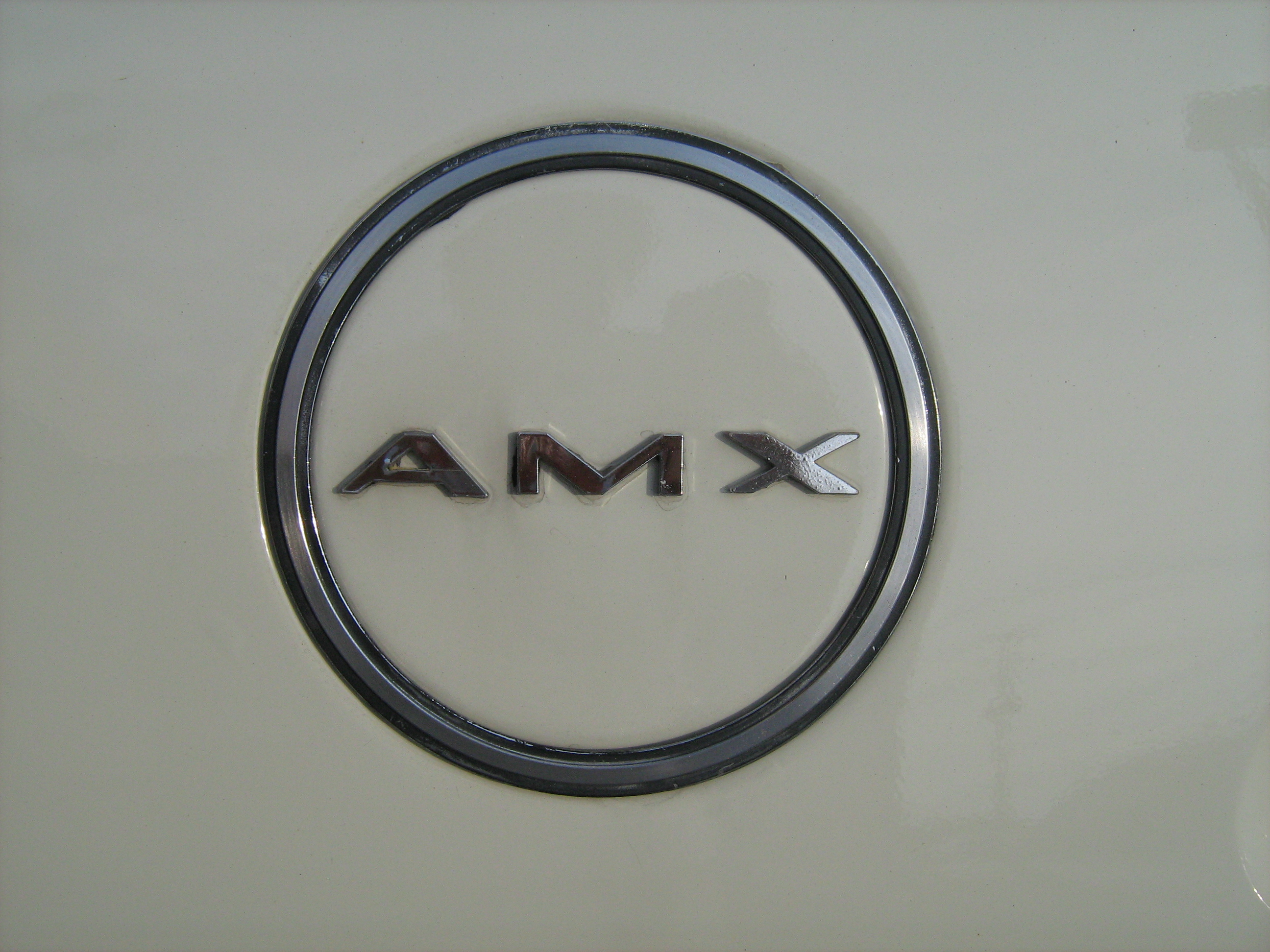
1968 and 1969 C-pillar AMX emblem

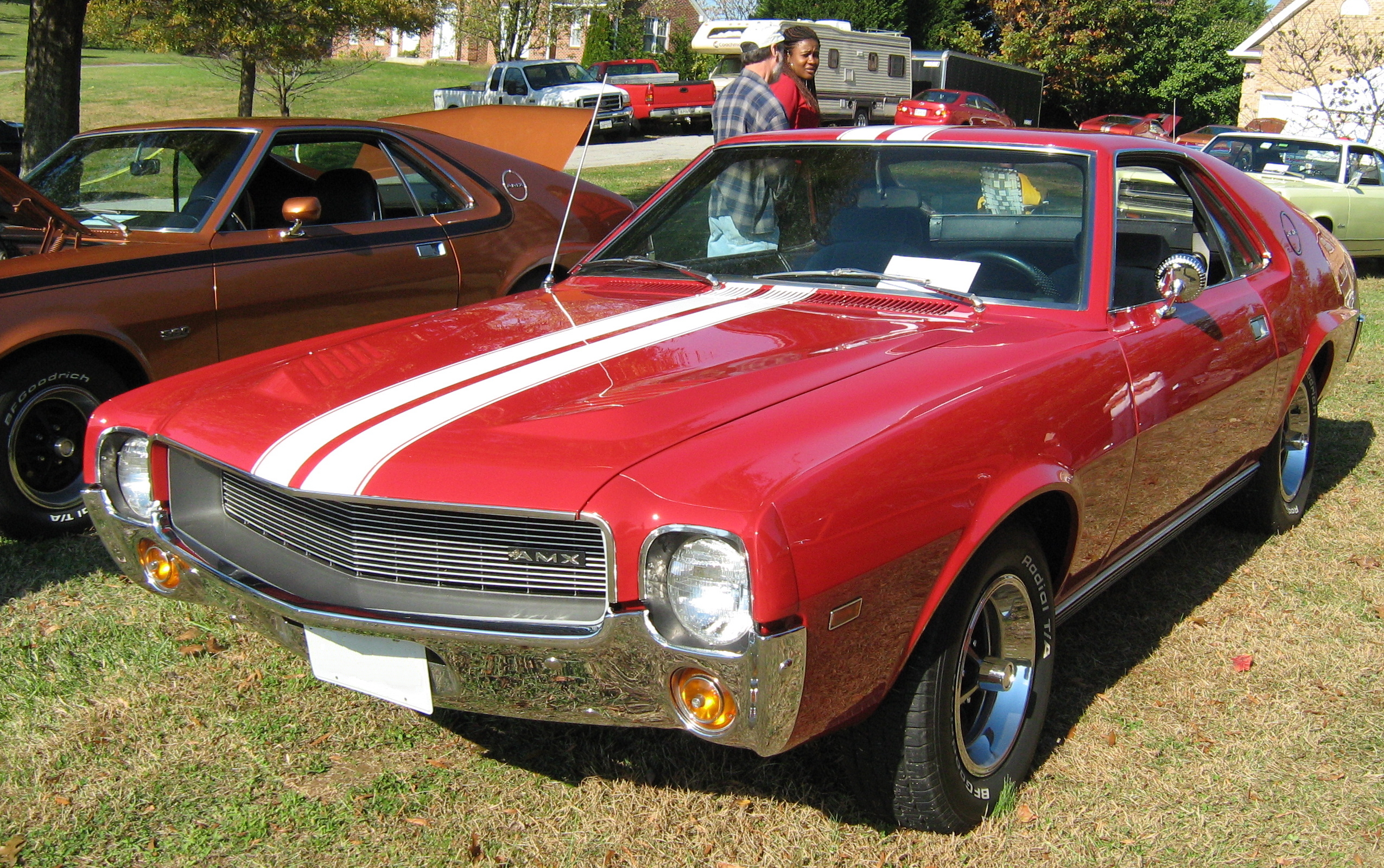
1969 AMC AMX in "Matador Red"

The AMX name originates from the "American Motors experimental" code used on a concept vehicle and then on two prototypes shown on the company's "Project IV" automobile show tour in 1966. One was a fiberglass two-seat "AMX", and the other was a four-seat "AMX II". These radically styled offerings reflected the company's strategy to shed its "economy car" image and appeal to a more youthful, performance-oriented market.

The original AMX full-scale models were developed in 1965 by AMC's advanced styling studios under the direction of Charles Mashigan. The two-seat AMX was a "big hit on the auto show circuit in 1966" and featured a rumble seat that opened out from the rear decklid for extra passengers called a "Ramble" seat. AMC executives saw the opportunity to change consumers' perceptions of the automaker from Romney's economy car image to the realities of the new marketplace interested in sporty, performance-oriented vehicles. Robert B. Evans requested a car like the AMX to be put into production quickly.

Two simultaneous development programs emerged for a production car: a modified Javelin and another for a completely new vehicle bodied in fiberglass. The first approach was selected to allow AMC to use its existing technology and unibody manufacturing expertise to make relatively inexpensive modifications to the Javelin, approximating the prototype's styling and proportions. The automaker could turn out steel bodies in large numbers, so it rejected developing plastic (or fiberglass) bodies because those are intended only for low-production models. The first fully operational unit debuted as part of AMC's AMX project in 1966. The once-"frumpy" automaker jumped on the "pony car bandwagon" with its "attractive Javelin" and soon introduced the "unique" AMX featuring a design where "hoods didn't come any longer, nor decks any shorter".

Vic Raviolo, previously responsible for the Lincolns that raced in the Carrera Panamericana during the 1950s, was involved with engineering AMC's new sports-car-type coupe. The AMX was the first steel-bodied, two-seat American performance car since the 1955 through 1957 Ford Thunderbird. Ford's original two-seater evolved into a four-seat personal luxury car starting in 1958.

The AMX was also the only mass-produced, domestic two-seater to share the market with Chevrolet's Corvette since the 1957 Thunderbird. With a short, 97 in (2,464 mm), wheelbase, the AMX's direct competition was the one-inch longer (98 in (2,489 mm) Chevrolet Corvette. The AMX's manufacturer's suggested retail price (MSRP) was US$3,245 (US$30,043 in 2025 dollars), nearly 25% below and over $1,000 less than the Corvette's price tag.

The AMX was introduced to the press at the Daytona International Speedway on 15 February 1968, just over four months after the Javelin went on sale. In the demonstrations on the race track, the new AMXs ran at speeds up to 130 mph (209 km/h). American Motors' group vice president, Vic Raviolo, described the AMX as "the Walter Mitty Ferrari". The AMX was designed to "appeal to both muscle car and sports car enthusiasts, two camps that rarely acknowledged each other's existences." The problem was the "tire-melting" acceleration of the two-seater made it "a quick car that handled like a sports car, confusing the buying public." Automotive journalist Tom McCahill summed up, "the AMX is the hottest thing to ever come out of Wisconsin and ... you can whip through corners and real hard bends better than with many out-and-out sports cars."

== Record-breaking ==
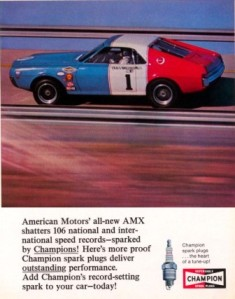
AMX "shatters" speed records in an advertisement for Champion spark plugs

To promote the new car, AMC's manager for performance activities, Carl Chakmakian, asked world land speed record holder Craig Breedlove to put the AMX through its paces before the new vehicles were even available for sale. In January 1968, two specially prepared AMXs set 106 world speed and endurance records at Goodyear's track in Texas driven by Breedlove, his wife Lee, and Ron Dykes. Breedlove's "Spirit of America" crew and Traco Engineering had six weeks to prepare the cars before they were to be displayed at the Chicago Auto Show in February.

The AMC V8 engines, such as the 290 cu in (4.8 L) engine in one car was bored out to 304 cu in (5.0 L) and the 390 cu in (6.4 L) in the other to 397 cu in (6.5 L). The shop installed exhaust headers, eight-quart oil pans, oil coolers, hi-rise intake manifolds, racing camshafts with solid lifters and stronger springs, and larger carburetors. The cars had engine and rear-end oil coolers, as well as 37 US gal (140 L; 31 imp gal) cell-type safety fuel tanks. Engine components were X-rayed and Magnafluxed to check for cracks, as were chassis components.

Chassis preparation included heavy-duty front and rear springs (part of the factory's optional handling package), rear spring traction control arms, heavy-duty shock absorbers, and a "panhard" type track bar in the rear to eliminate side sway. Wide magnesium racing wheels and Goodyear racing tires replaced the stock road wheels and standard tires. The cars were aerodynamically modified: the front ends were lowered, the hoods were slanted down, and spoilers were installed below the front bumpers. The car interiors had structure-stiffening roll cages for driver protection, a stock bucket seat modified for additional support, and supplementary engine-monitoring instruments.

Breedlove also took the AMX to Bonneville reaching 189 mph (304 km/h) in a United States Auto Club (USAC) sanctioned run, as well as an unofficial run of over 200 mph (322 km/h).

== Industry firsts ==
The American Society of Automotive Engineers (SAE) named the AMX as the "best-engineered car of the year" in 1969 and 1970.

For its first-year recognition, the reasons cited included the car's dashboard, which was injection-molded in one piece "for safety purposes, an industry first." The AMX's new 390 cu in (6.4 L) engine was developed to have a large displacement within its minimal external dimensions and moderate weight, while the use of common components and machining with AMC's 290 and 343 engines assured manufacturing economy. The 1968 models also included an innovative fiberglass safety padding, a "plastic" on the inside of the windshield posts that was first used on the AMC Javelins.

For the following year's award, the SAE recognition included the 1970 AMXs (and Javelins) being the first production cars to use windshields that were safer, thinner, and lighter than ordinary laminated glass. Developed by Corning, the glass featured a chemically hardened layer designed to give under impact and crumble into small granules to reduce injuries. The inner layer has "stress raisers that will cause it to break before excessively high concussion forces can be developed in the occupant's skull."

American Motors also incorporated new designs for windshield sealing for the 1970 models and developed a systems solutions process that began in the styling studio to ensure maximum efficiency.

== 1968 ==
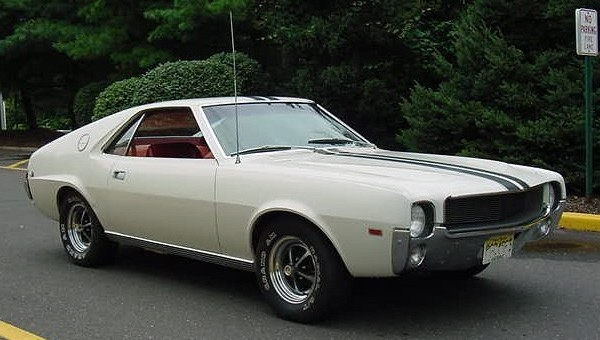
1968 AMC AMX with Go-Pac

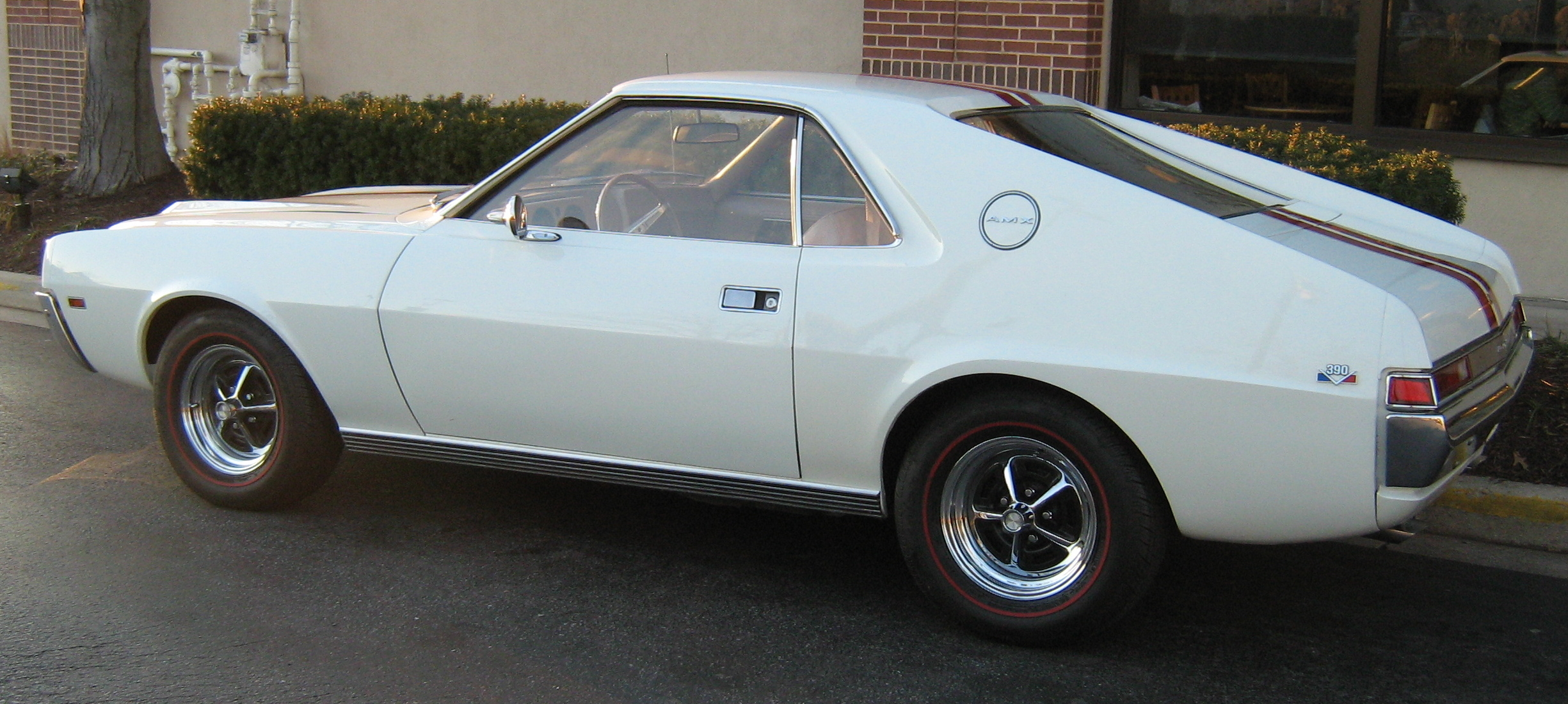
1968 AMC AMX with chrome wheels and red stripe tires standard with Go-Package

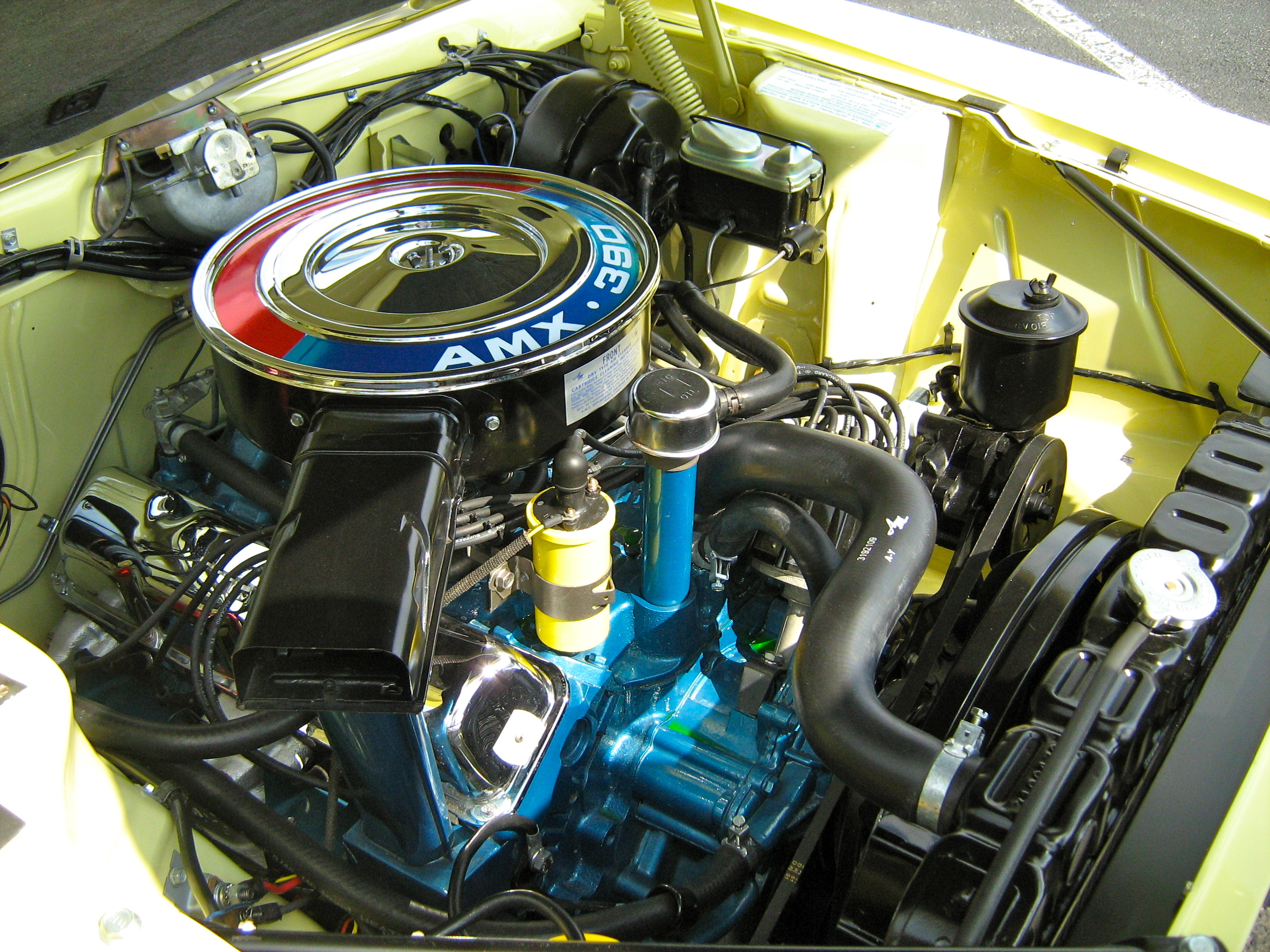
The "AMX 390" engine

American Motors promoted the mid-model year launch of the AMX to automotive journalists at Daytona to emphasize its sports car performance, as well as with a marketing agreement with Playboy Enterprises. To introduce the AMX to its dealers, AMC held meetings at nine Playboy Clubs.

The AMX was introduced to the public on 24 February 1968, five months after the Javelin and other 1968 AMC cars. The AMX was promoted as "the only American sports car that costs less than $3500". American Motors advertisements also showed "a helmeted race driver revving up at the starting line in one of AMC's sporty AMX models, which it describes as ready to do 125 miles an hour."

The two-seat AMX was "meant for a small, well-defined market niche, and it pulled young people into AMC dealer showrooms in never before seen numbers". Numerous road tests described the new AMX as a "handsome two-seater with American-style acceleration and European-style handling". Journalists gave it a real run workout on all kinds of terrain and wrote "that the AMX is one of the best-looking cars – if not the best-looking car – made in the U.S.A."

All AMXs came with four-barrel carbureted small block AMC V8 engines in several versions: 290 cu in (4.8 L) (225 hp (168 kW), N-code), 343 cu in (5.6 L) (290 hp (220 kW), T-code), as well as the 390 cu in (6.4 L) "AMX" featuring 315 hp (235 kW) with 425 pound force-feet (576 N⋅m) of torque (X-code). All are derived from the same external size block. However, the three engines differed vastly internally, with the smallest engine having small intake and exhaust valves, thin block webbing, and a cast nodular iron crankshaft; the 343 used larger valves with a thicker block webbing; and the 390 moved up to a forged steel crankshaft and connecting rods, as well as larger rod bearings, 2.250 in (57.15 mm) compared to 2.090 in (53.09 mm) in the smaller two versions.

A BorgWarner T-10 four-speed manual transmission was standard, as were unique traction bars, dual exhaust system, and fatter tires for better traction. A "Shift-Command" three-speed automatic transmission with the capability of manual shifting (BorgWarner model M-11B or M-12) was optional together with a floor console mounted shifter.

A popular "Go-Package" option was available with the four-barrel 343 or 390 engine. It included power-assisted front disk brakes, "Twin-Grip" differential, E70x14 red-stripe performance tires on 6-inch wide steel road wheels, heavy-duty suspension with thicker sway-bars, heavy-duty cooling, as well as other performance enhancements. A wide range of specialized performance parts were also available through AMC dealers for installation on customer's cars. These were known as "Group 19" parts because of how AMC organized its parts books.

=== Breedlove AMX ===
According to several sources, "Breedlove Replica" cars to commemorate the speed and endurance records were offered by AMC. The Standard Catalog of American Muscle Cars 1960–1972 describes an estimated 50 "Breedlove" AMXs were sold featuring the red, white, and blue paint scheme along with the standard 4-barrel 290 cu in (4.8 L) V8 with four-speed manual transmission.

However, AMC historians argue there was no "factory literature, order sheets, advertising, photographs, or anything else to properly document any factory 1968 or 1969 'Breedlove Replica' AMXs." According to historians, a new car that a dealer in Canada ordered could not have been painted at the factory, but rather outsourced to local Kenosha body shops to perform the final painting.

=== Playmate AMX ===
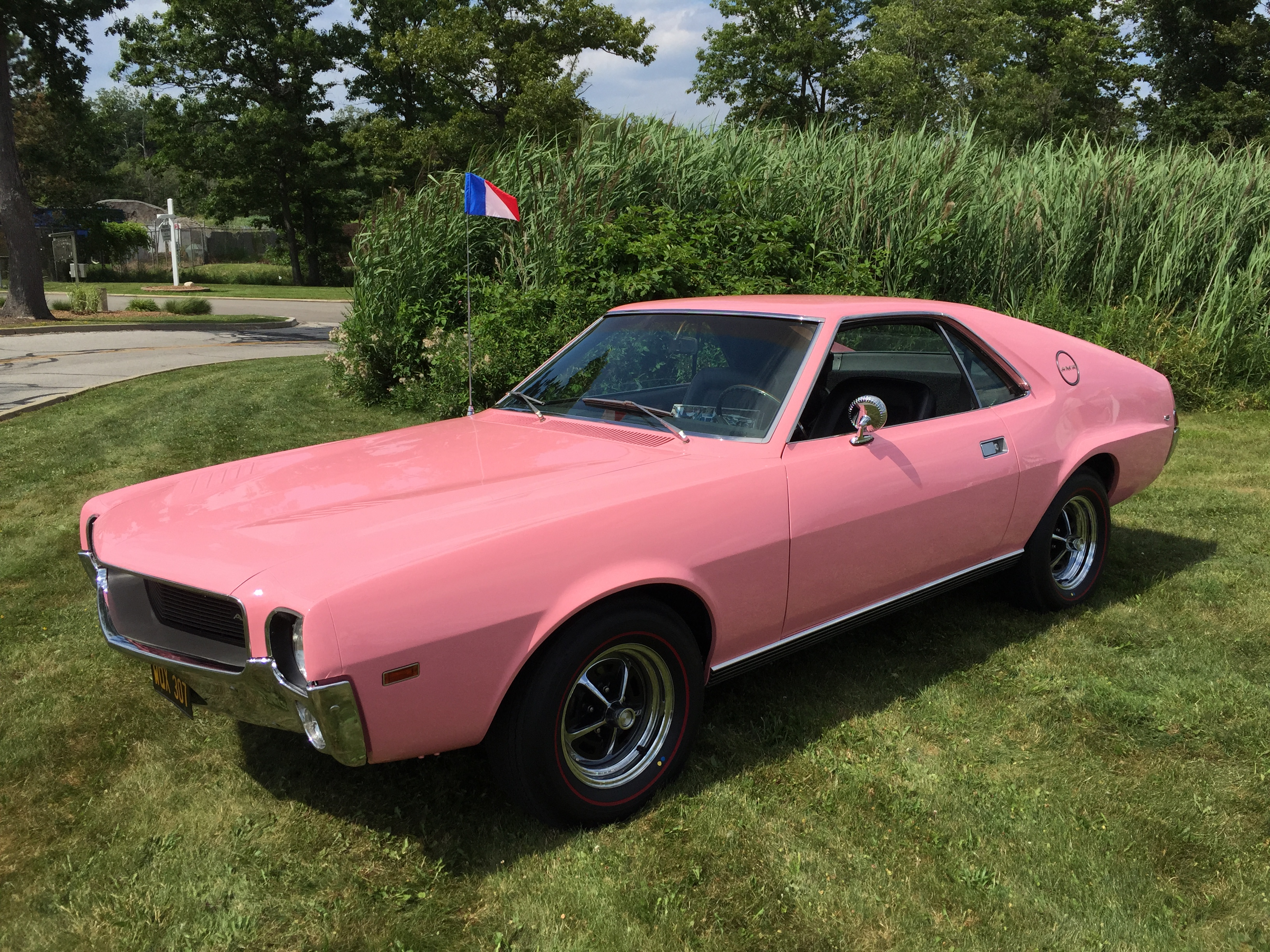
The actual PMOY award car

Playboy magazine's 1968 Playmate of the Year, Angela Dorian, was awarded a specially painted "Playmate Pink" 1968 AMX. It was powered by the base 290 V8 with automatic transmission, air conditioning, tilt wheel, AM/8-track radio and optional rear bumper guards. Aside from the unique color, it differed from other AMXs with its dashboard number plate containing Dorian's measurements, making her car AMX 36–24–35. The car, currently owned by Mark Melvin who purchased it from Dorian in 2010, was featured in an episode of Jay Leno's Garage.

Some sources describe other AMXs as having been painted Playmate Pink at the factory. AMC's marketing vice-president, Bill McNealy, who handed over the keys to Angela Dorian's car, mentioned that "a number of them" were finished in pink.

In late 1968, a Playmate Pink AMX was special-ordered by a dealership in rural Potosi, Missouri. This 1969 model year car's door tag indicates a "00" paint code (meaning a special-order color). It has a 390 V8 with automatic transmission, as well as the performance "GO" Package, air conditioning, and leather seats.

=== Hertz rent-a-racer ===
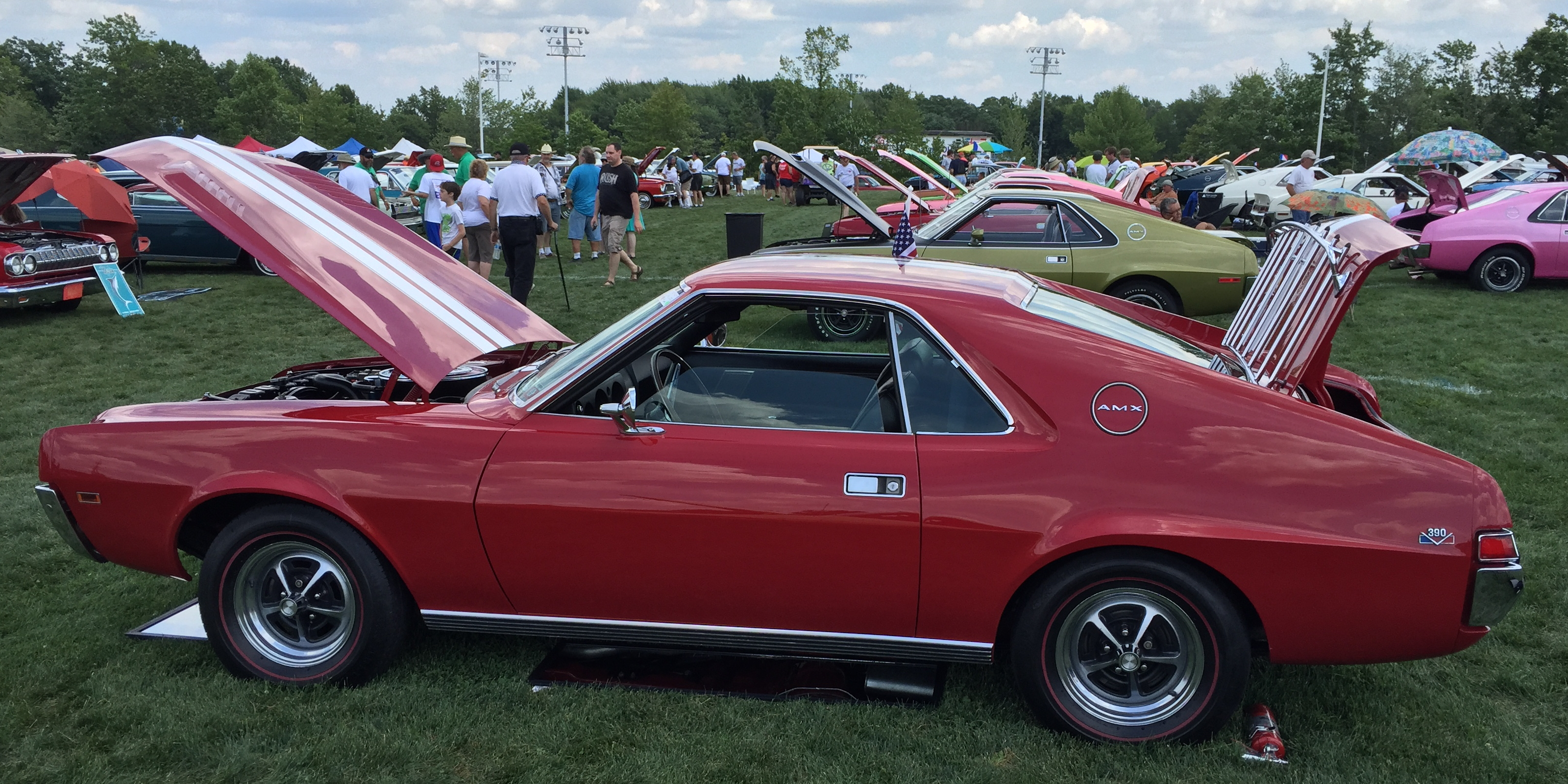
Restored 1968 AMX, originally a Hertz rental car

In the late-1960s, The Hertz Corporation offered "rent-a-racer" program in selected locations that included cars such as Corvettes, Jaguar XK-Es, Shelby Mustangs, and AMXs. There is no record of how many AMXs were ordered by Hertz for their fleet. Still, the factory "Build Sheet" for a car may indicate that AMC sold the car to Hertz.

=== Von Piranha Edition ===
Thoroughbred Motors in Denver, Colorado, modified an estimated 22 new AMXs for select AMC dealerships to have ready-made racers for both the dragstrips and road courses nearby. They were named "Von Piranha" and the changes included the addition of two sets of air scoops on each C-pillar with ducts to cool the rear brakes and on the roof above the windshield that was reportedly functional to cool the cockpit on race-bred versions. The AMX's twin hood bulges were cut open to increase airflow in the engine bay. The original Piranha buildup was believed to have AMC's Group 19 R4B intake stamped with the Von Piranha logo and a 950 CFM Holley three-barrel carburetor. The sales manager at Thoroughbred at the time and local racing legend, Ronald Hunter, raced a Piranha at the Continental Divide Raceways and other events.

== 1969 ==
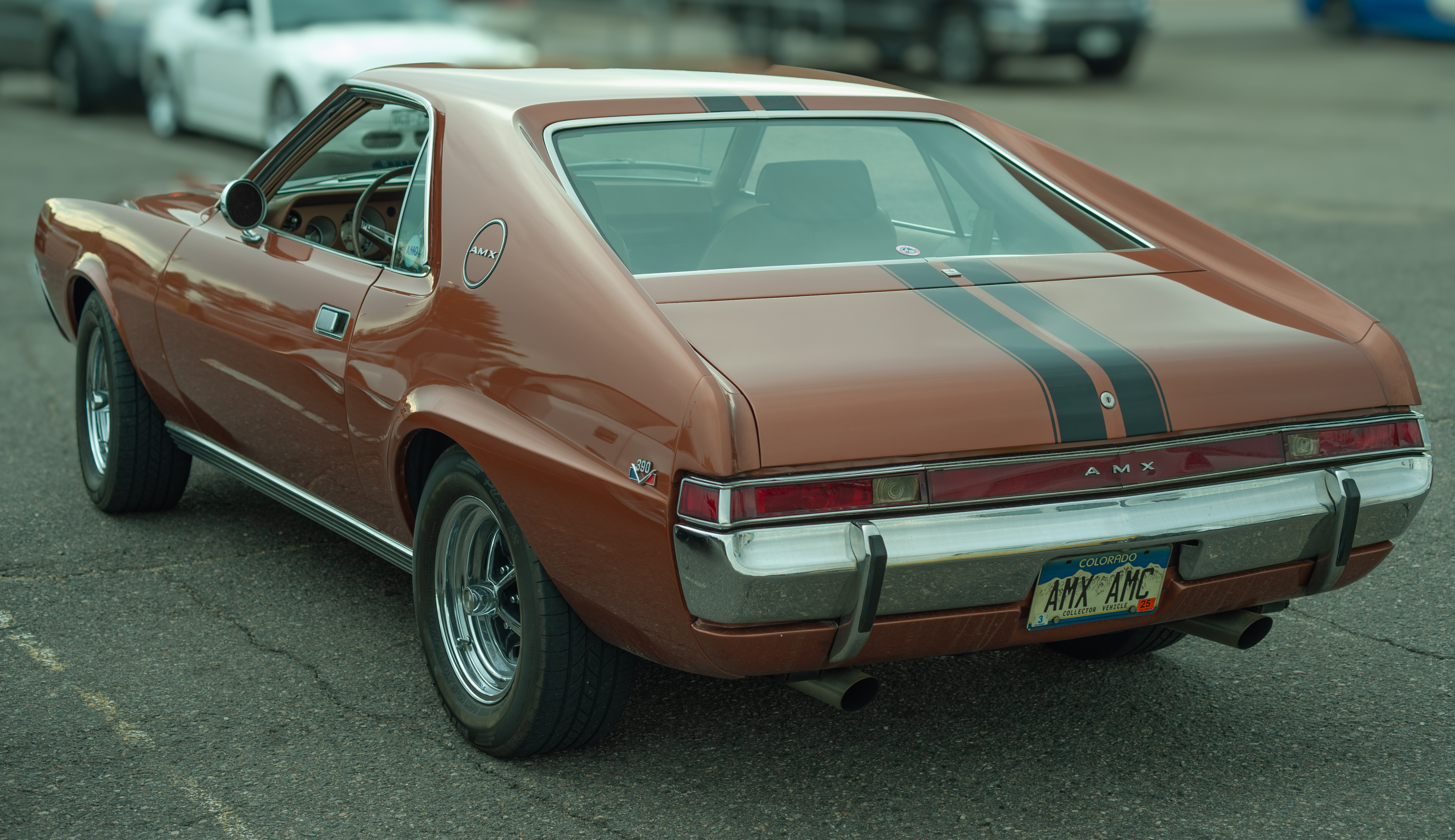
1969 AMX with Go Package in Bittersweet Orange metallic

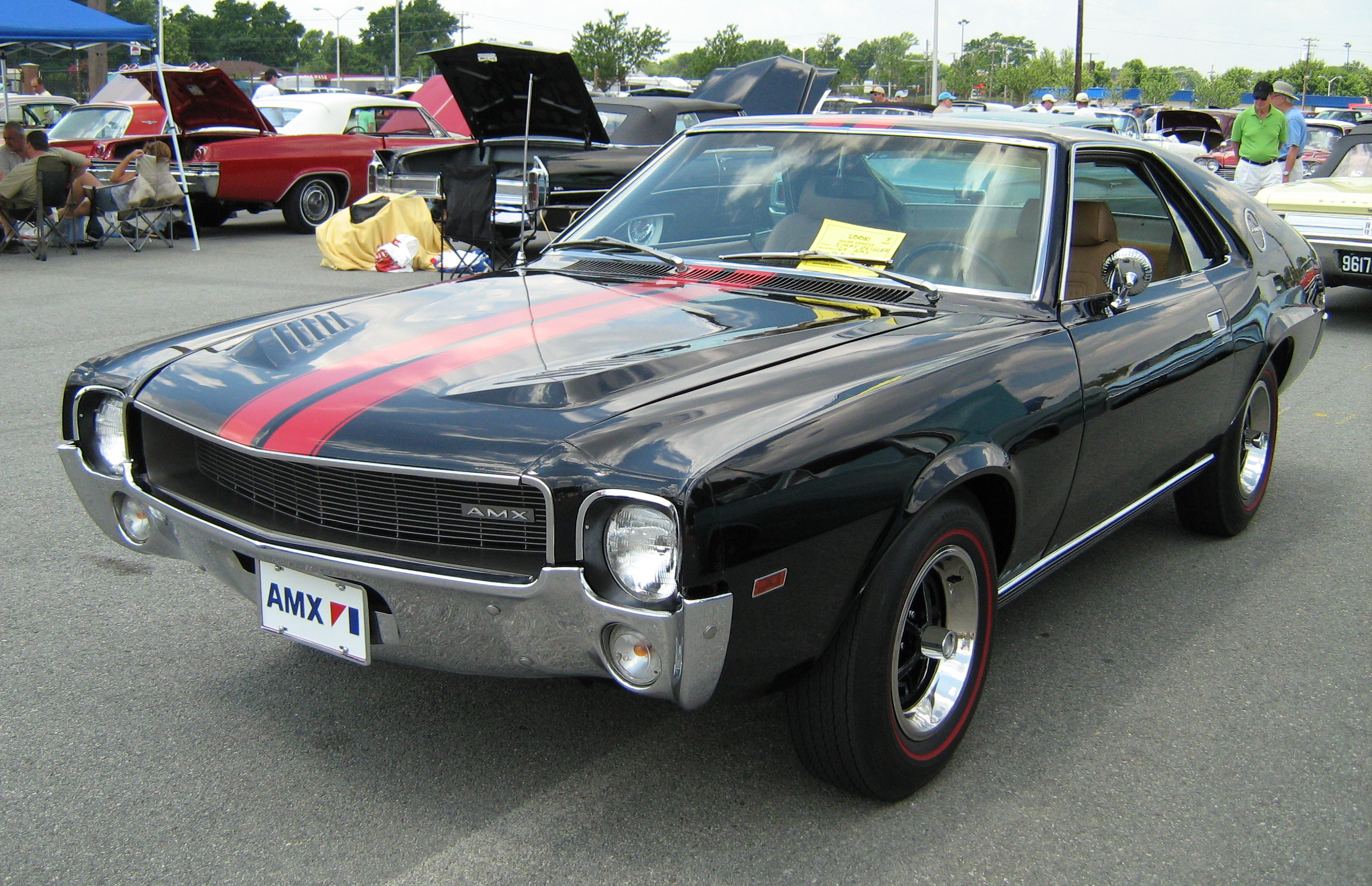
1969 AMC AMX

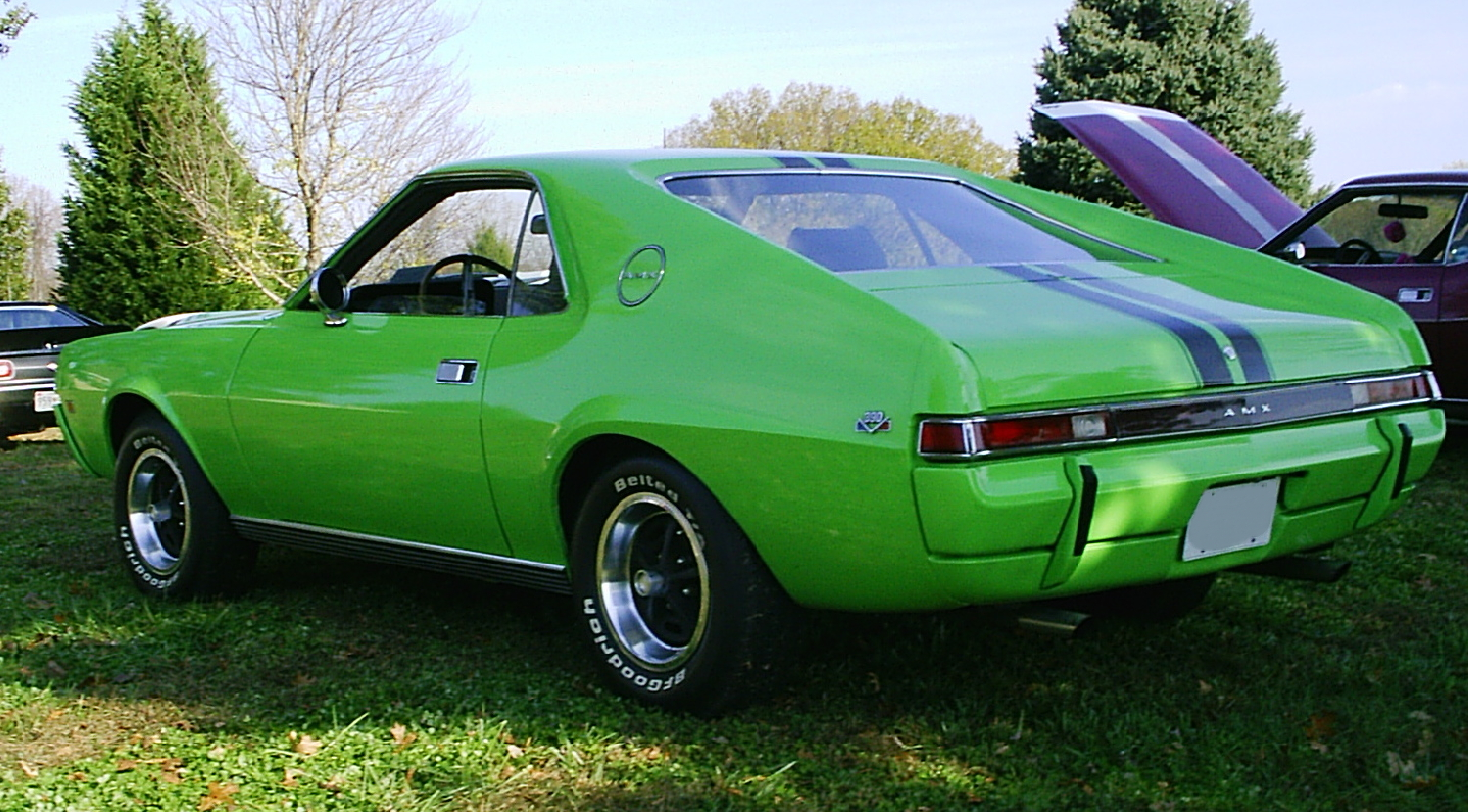
1969 AMC AMX in "Big Bad Green"

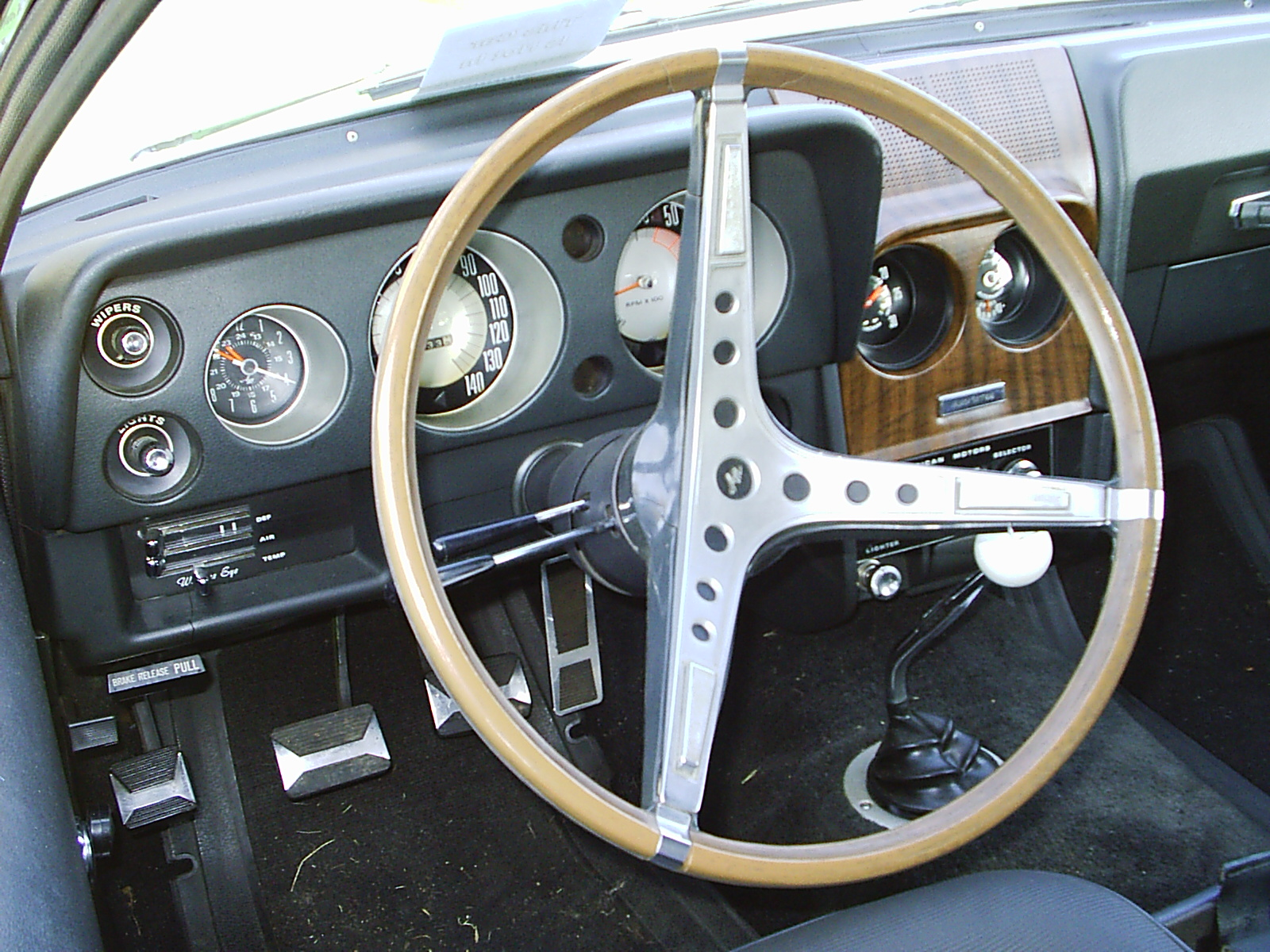
1969 AMX interior with the center panel "Gauge package"

The AMX's full second model year saw only slight changes, except for a $52 increase in its base price. The five-spoke Magnum 500 steel road wheels were no longer chrome plated, but now came with a stainless steel trim ring. The racing stripes were now available in five colors. The interior featured a revised instrumentation with the 0–8000 rpm tachometer moved to match the speedometer that was now calibrated to 140 mph (230 km/h). Interior door panels were revised, carpeting was upgraded, new leather upholstery was optional, and the gas pedal became suspended. Later production cars received a hood over the instruments in front of the driver. Trunk capacity was 9.7 cubic feet (275 L).

Starting in January 1969, all manual transmission AMXs came with a Hurst floor shifter. The center console-mounted three-speed "Shift-Command" automatic remained optional with "1", "2", and "D" forward settings. The "D" mode was for fully automatic operation, but the driver could shift manually through all three gears by starting in the "1" setting for first gear with no upshift, then the "2" setting for second gear with no upshift, and finally to third-gear in the "D" setting.

A "Big Bad" paint option for $34 became available in mid-1969. The neon brilliant blue (BBB), orange (BBO), and green (BBG) exteriors included color-matched front and rear bumpers, as well as a unique slim bright lower grille moulding for the front bumper and two vertical rubber-faced painted bumper guards for the rear. The factory-painted 1969 AMXs were 195 in BBB, 285 in BBO, and 283 in BBG.

Popular Mechanics wrote that the 1969 "AMX preserves the status quo this year, being virtually unchanged, and remains an absolute delight to drive."

=== California 500 Special ===
The "California 500 Special" is a version of 1969 AMXs sold only by Southern California American Motors Dealer Association members. It was part of a marketing campaign to commemorate the 1969 season at the Riverside International Raceway. They would serve as pace car and the dealers would sell replicas. All were finished in Big Bad Green with black stripes and included the 390 Go-Pac, automatic transmission, air conditioning, power steering, adjustable steering wheel, tinted windows, radio, light group, visibility group, and a saddle leather interior. The cars also featured "Trendsetter Sidewinder" exhaust side pipes in place of the molding strips on the rocker panels and were identified by brass plaques mounted on the hood blisters that had crossed checkered racing flags and the words 500 Special. A total of 283 AMXs were built in Big Bad Green for the 1969 model year; however, the exact number of California 500 Special versions is unknown, with only an estimate of 32.

=== Super Stock AMX ===
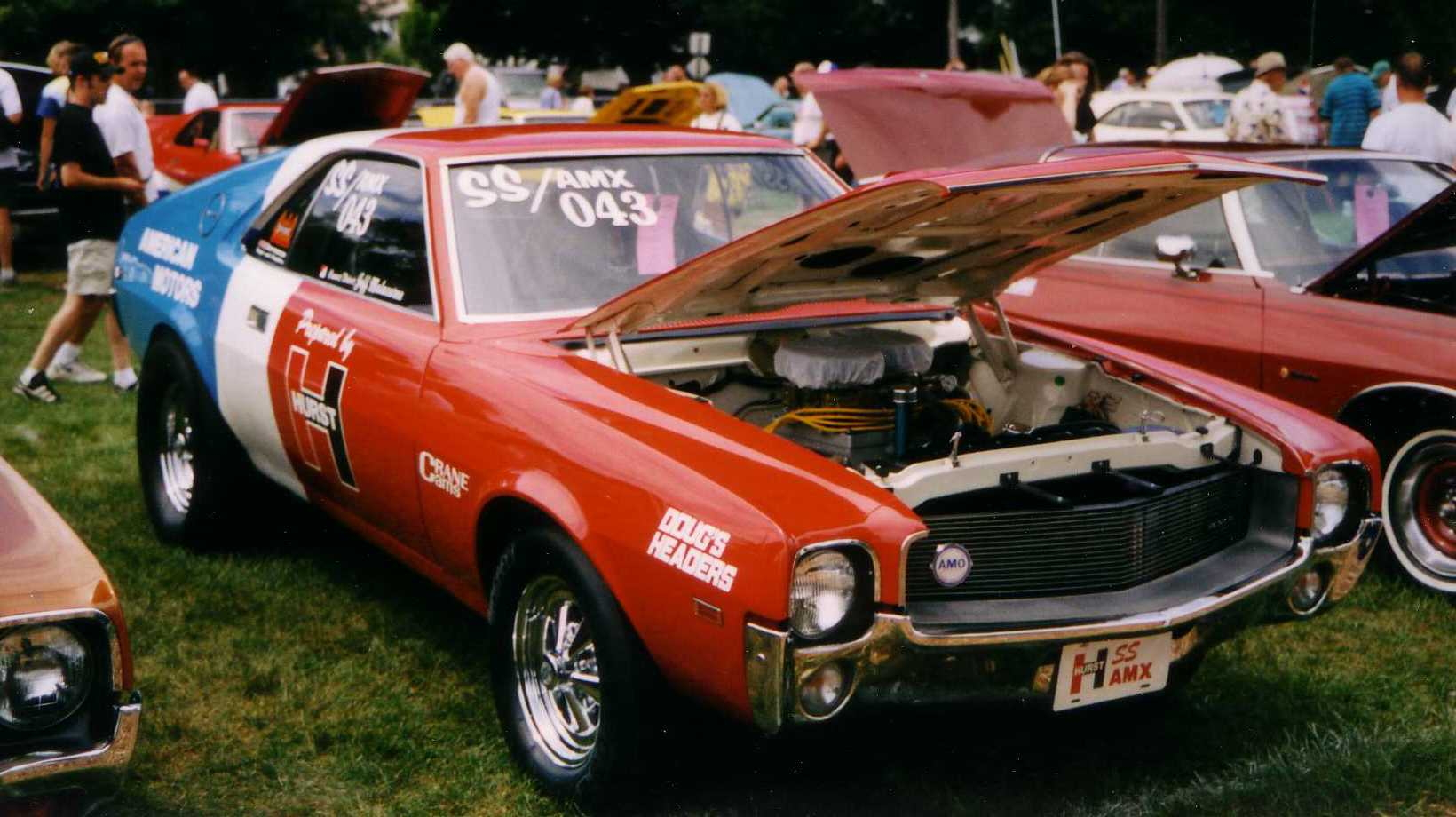
1969 Super Stock AMX

AMC also introduced the Super Stock AMX. To maximize quarter-mile performance, the 390 engine was equipped with twin Holley carburetors and 12.3:1 compression-ratio cylinder heads, plus aftermarket Doug's headers and exhaust system, and the tires were drag slicks. Hurst Performance carried out several additional modifications.

American Motors rated the car at 340 hp (250 kW), but the National Hot Rod Association (NHRA) rated it at 420 horsepower (310 kW) and shuffled it among various competition classes that included SS/G and SS/D. The Super Stock AMXs were also put in SS/E class by NHRA based on the car's 3,050 lb (1,383 kg) weight and estimated 405 hp (302 kW) and ultimately slotted into the SS/C class.

Most of the cars were prepared and custom-painted by AMC dealers to be campaigned at big racing events where they ran in the low 11s on the tracks. The best recorded quarter-mile was 10.73 seconds at 128 mph (206 km/h).

The Super Stock AMX was meant for the race track and lacked comfort equipment such as a heater. The car could be ordered in all white or vertical bands of red, white, and blue, distinguishing numerous AMC competition cars of the day. The base price was $5,994, approximately $1,900 more than a fully loaded 1969 AMX. Moreover, the factory warranty was unavailable for these cars.

=== Pikes Peak cars ===
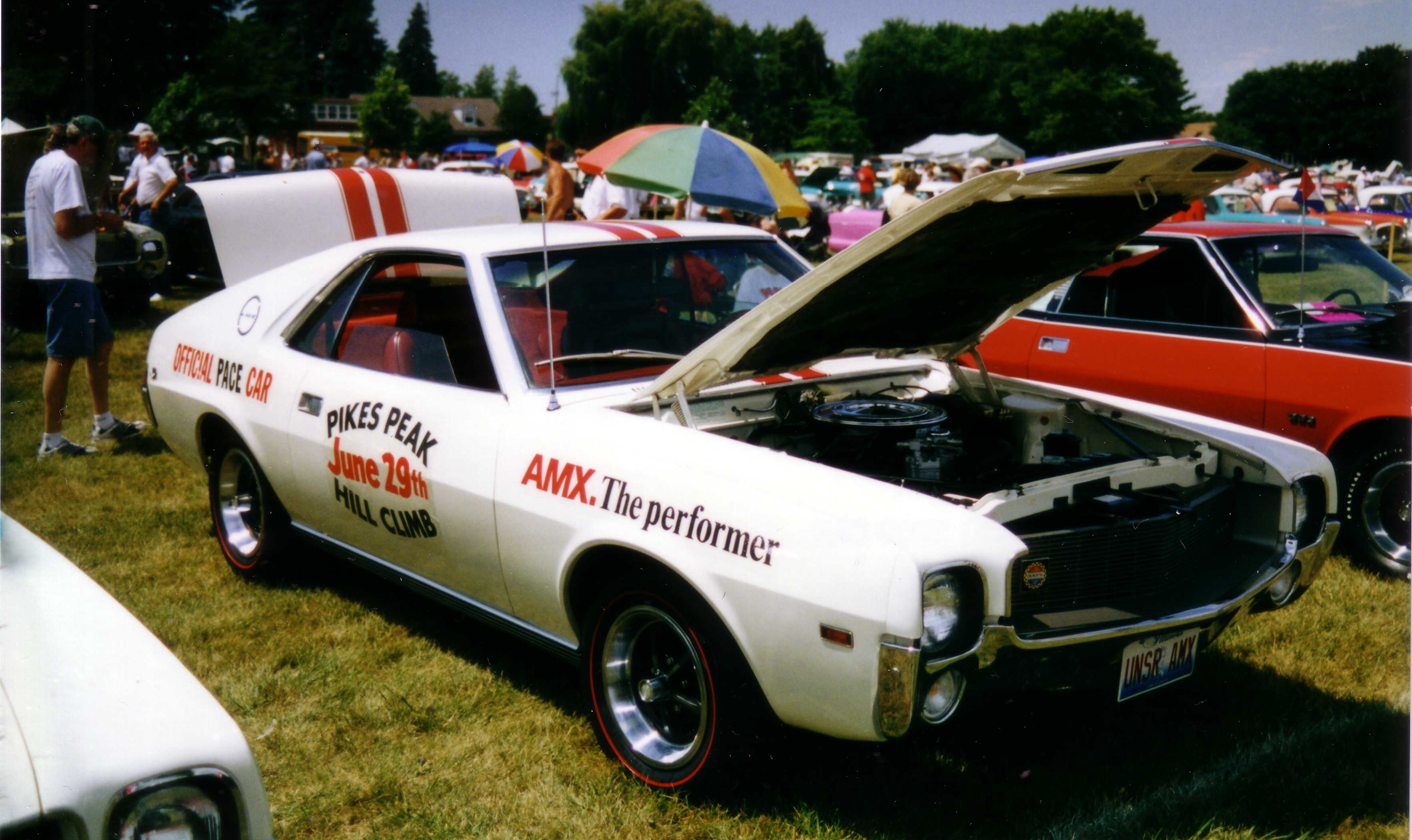
1969 AMX Pikes Peak pace car

The Pikes Peak International Hill Climb used 1969 AMXs as pace cars for the hillclimb race to the summit of Pikes Peak that was held on 29 June 1969 in Colorado.

The AMX Pace and Courtesy cars were used by racers (including Bobby Unser) to practice the week before the race up the mountain. There were 12 (10 according to some sources) pace/courtesy AMXs, and all were equipped with the "390 Go-Pac" option and finished in "Frost White" with red stripes and red interiors.

Many AMC and Jeep vehicles have participated in the annual race, winning class titles and setting records. However, the only two-seat AMX officially raced in the hill climb was a 1969 model by Larry G. Mitchell in the 1987 "Vintage" class.

=== AMX-R ===
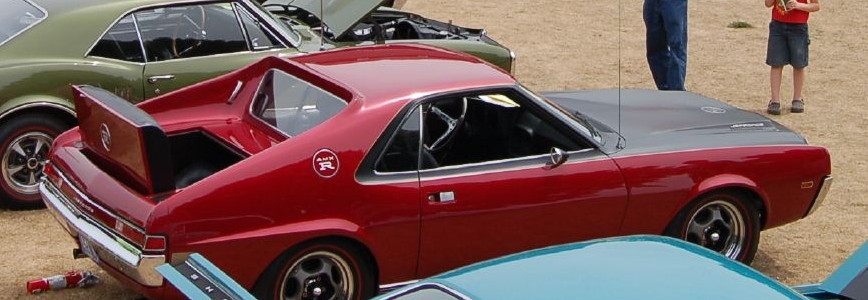
AMX-R at the 2007 Gilmore Car Museum car show

The original AMX's "Ramble" seat idea was considered for possible production. A working prototype was built in 1968 from a regular AMX by James Jeffords, a designer-customizer, and was named the AMX-R. Jeffords was also head of the Javelin Trans Am Racing Team for AMC. Together with industrial designer Brooks Stevens, they decided to also "plush up" the interior, add custom paint treatment and hood with Jeffords's name in badge form, as well as a modified suspension as part of their plan to offer an optional Ramble seat for 500 production cars. The prototype was prepared by Dave Puhl's House of Kustoms in Palatine, Illinois. However, numerous problems prevented serial production, including safety and product liability concerns, AMC's refusal to sell him the cars to modify, as well as the adverse reaction from Ralph Nader to the exposed exterior seating idea. The AMX-R's special blacked-out hood treatment would later be offered as a "shadow mask" option on 1970 AMX models.

== 1970 ==
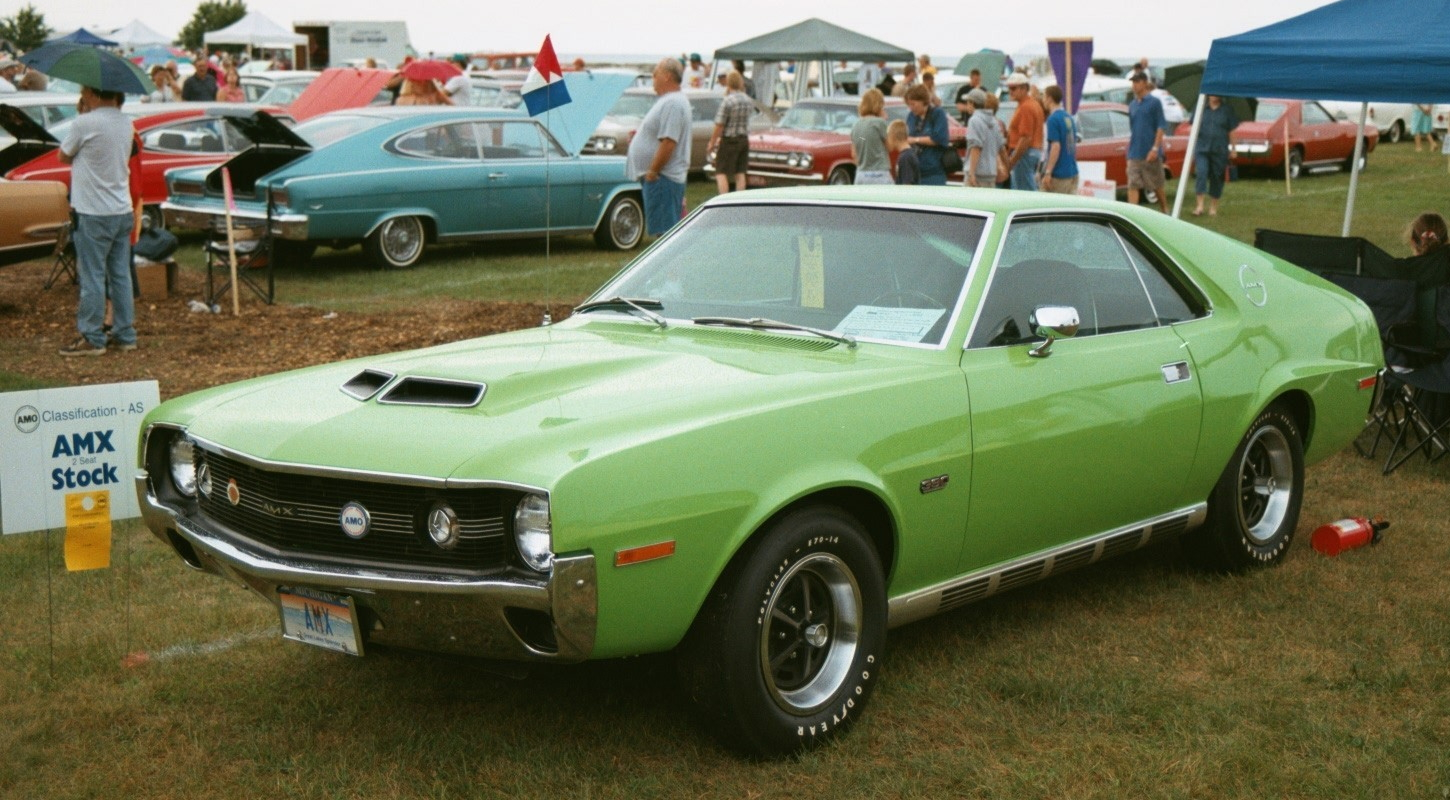
1970 AMC AMX

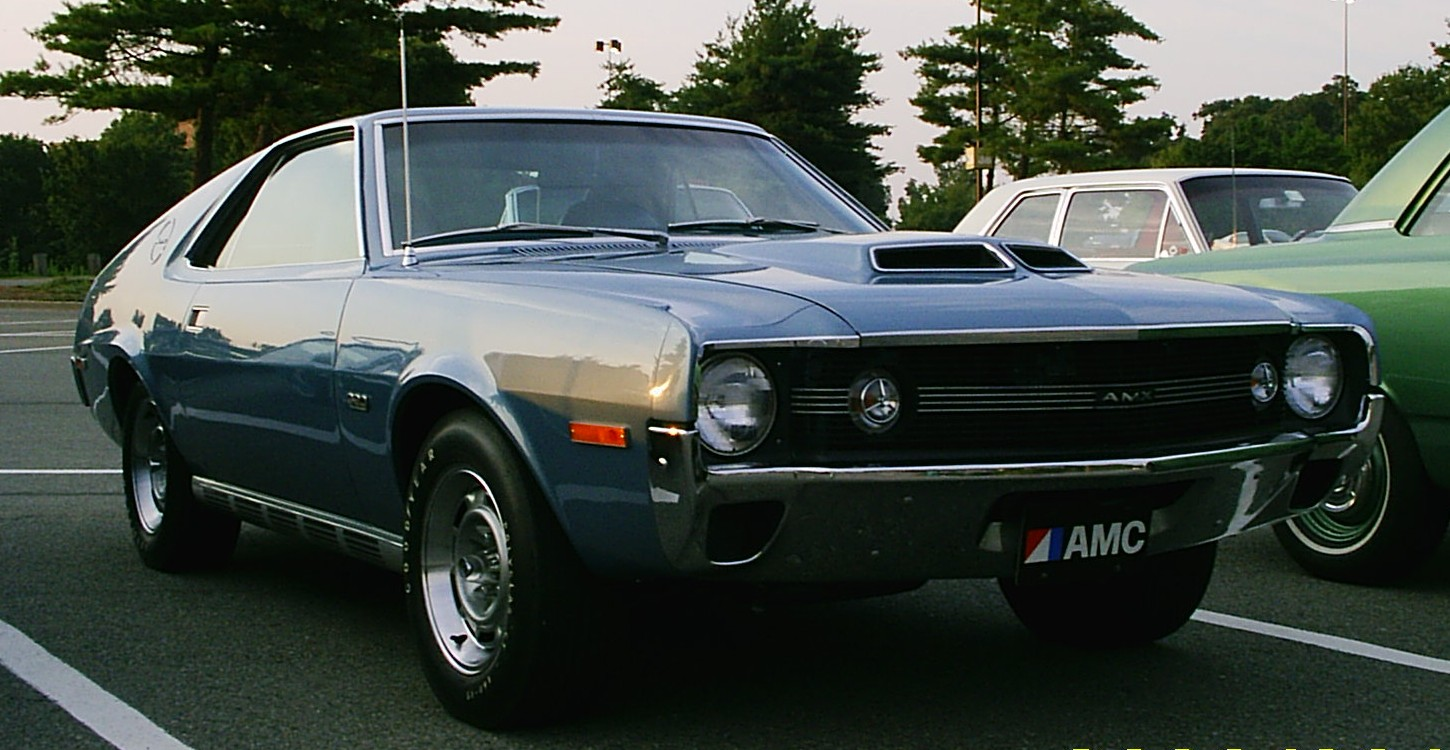
1970 AMC AMX with "Ram Air" 390 V8

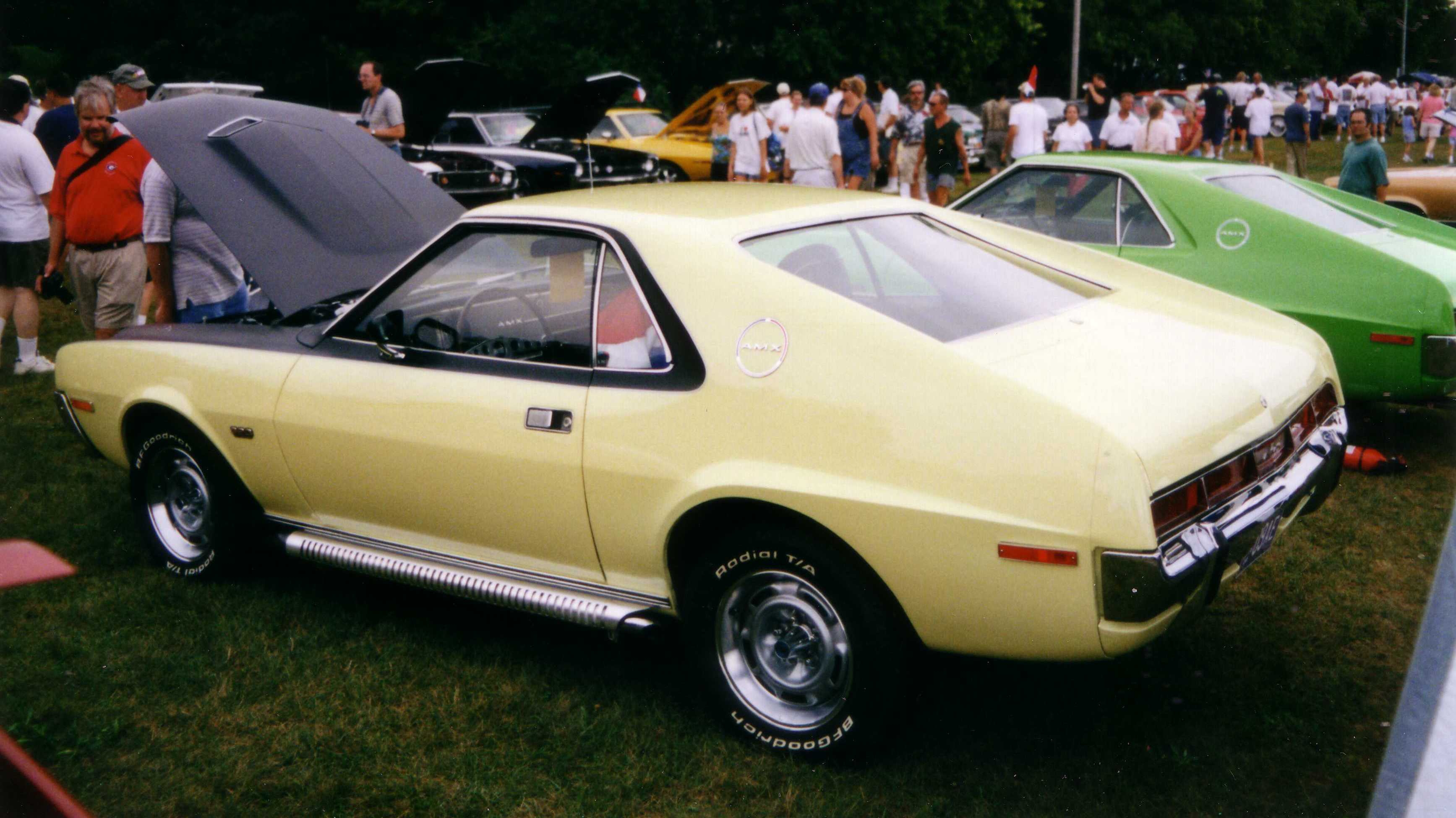
1970 AMC AMX with black shadow mask

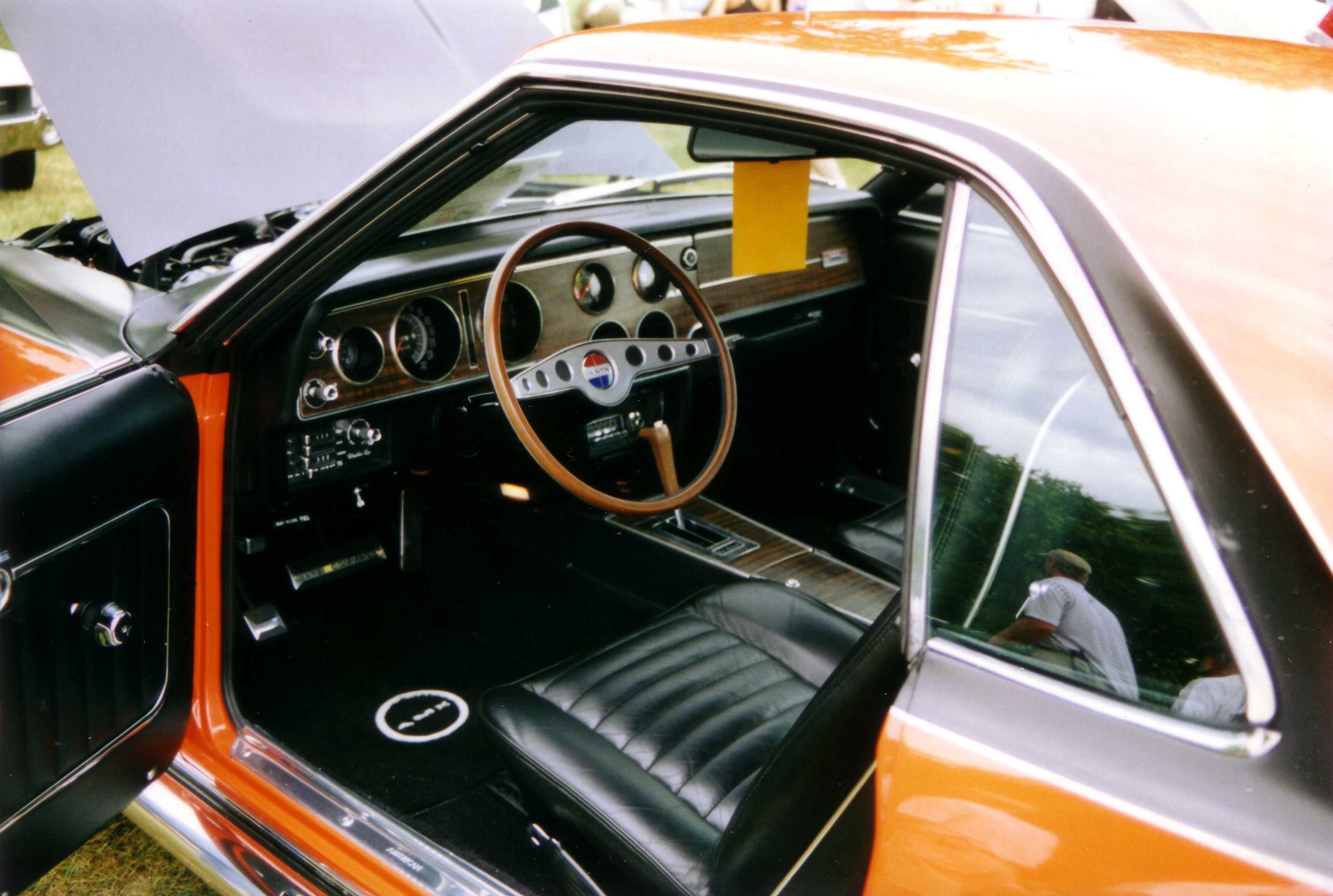
1970 AMX interior

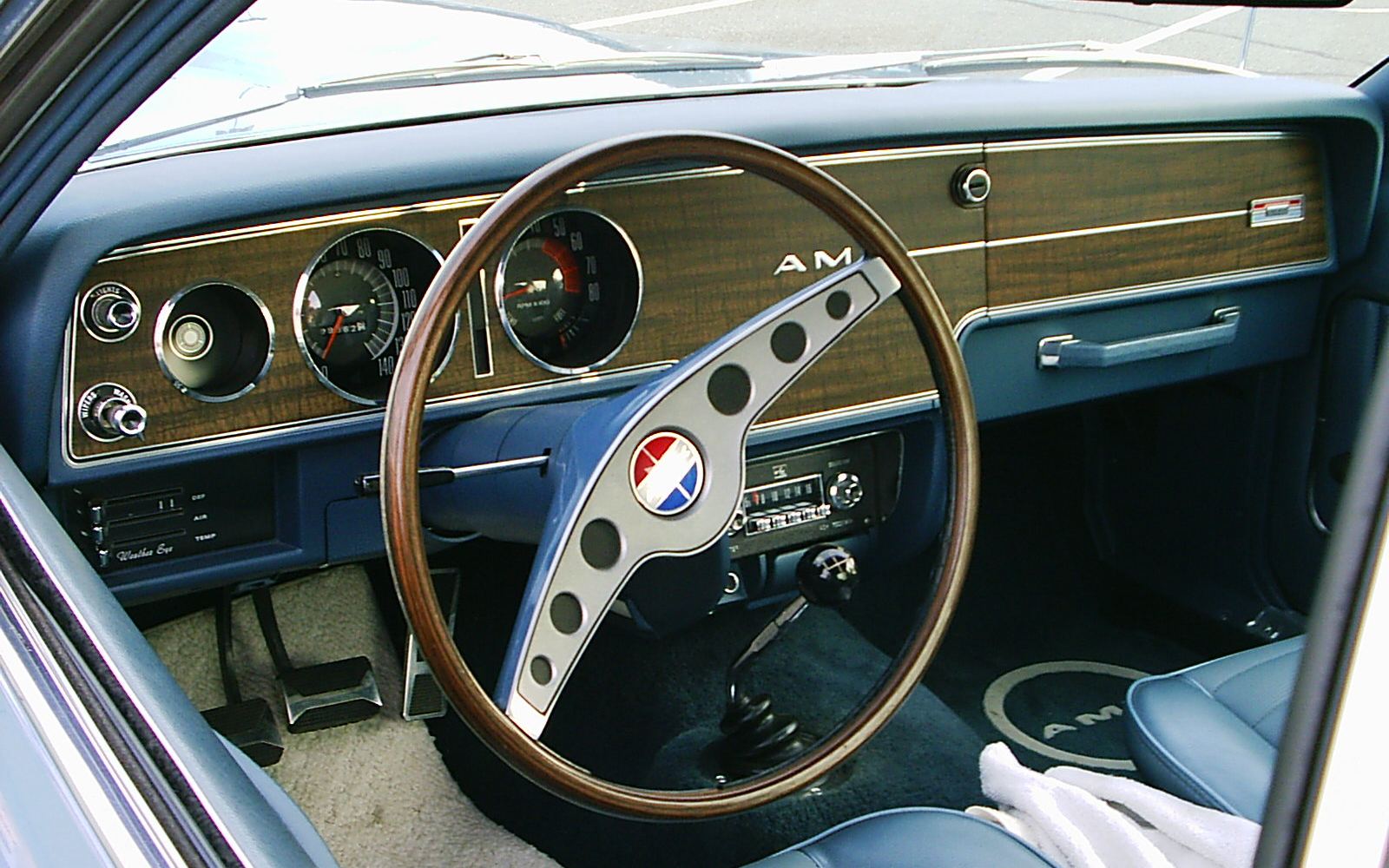
1970 AMX with standard simulated wood-grained rim-blow steering wheel

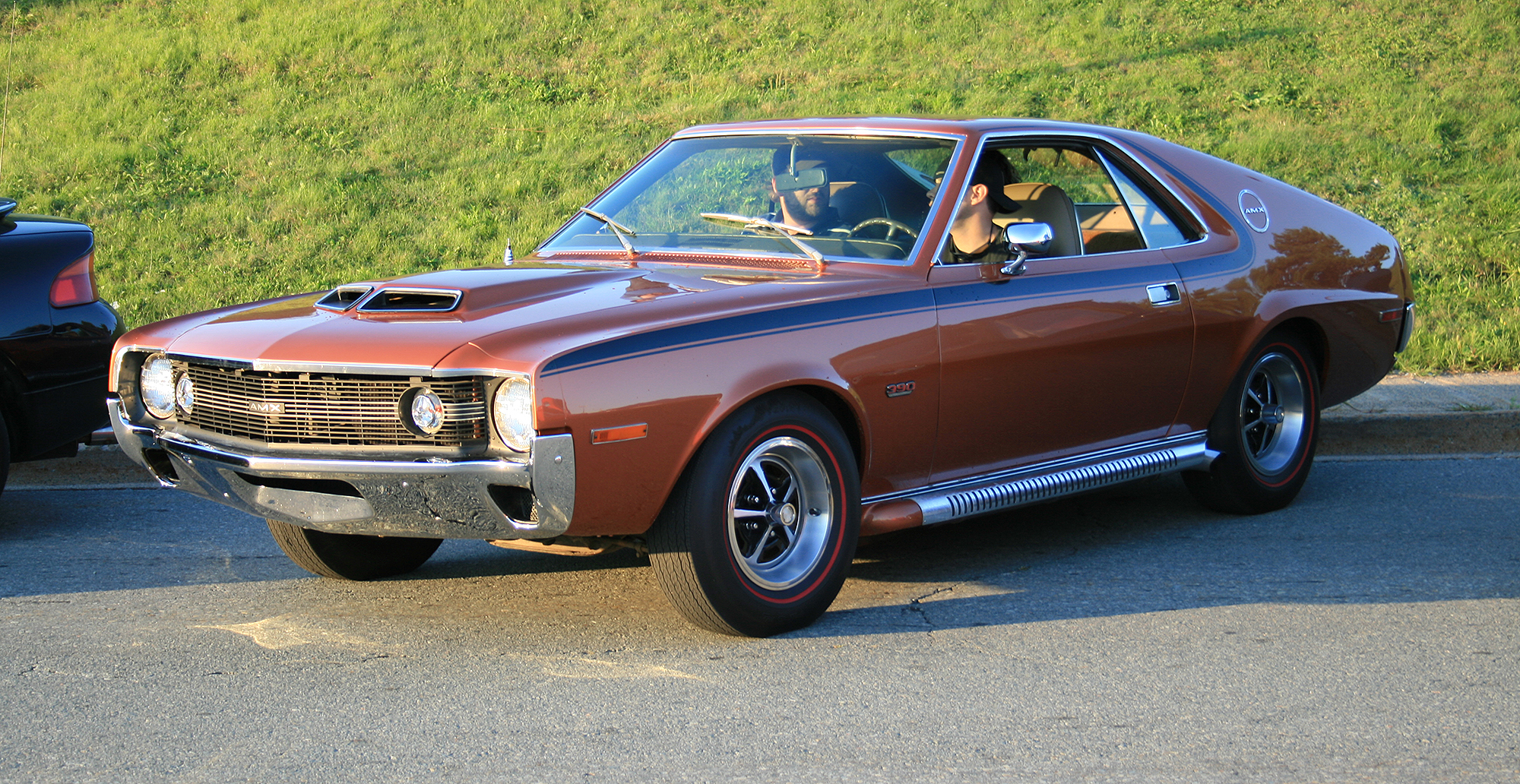
1970 AMC AMX with factory sidewinder sidepipes

American Motors 1970 AMX advertising headlined, "We made the AMX look tougher this year because it's tougher this year". They were mildly facelifted resembling the first two model years, but the changes were different enough to be a separate design for 1970. Featured was a new front-end design with a longer hood that had a "power blister" with two large openings. These air intakes were functional cold ram-air induction system with the popular "Go Package" available with the 360 and 390 engines. The new grille was flush and full-width, incorporating the headlamps. The revised rear end also featured full-width taillamps and a single center-mounted backup light. Side marker lights were now shared with several other AMC models. Riding on the same wheelbase 97-inch (2,464 mm) as before, the changes increased the AMX's overall body length by about 2 in (50.8 mm) to 179 in (4,547 mm).

American Motors also changed the AMX's engine lineup for 1970 with the introduction of a new 360 cu in (5.9 L) four-barrel (290 hp (220 kW), P-code) to replace the 343 cu in (5.6 L) V8. The smallest 290 was dropped, and AMC could claim 65 more base horsepower than the AMXs featured previously. The 390 cu in (6.4 L) V8 engine continued, but upgraded to new heads with 51 cc (3.1 cu in) combustion chambers that increased power to 325 hp (330 PS; 242 kW) at 4800 rpm and 430 lb⋅ft (583 N⋅m) of torque at 3200 rpm. The code remained "X" for the engine on the vehicle identification number (VIN). The "Go package" was available with the 360 cu in (5.9 L) engine (including power front disc brakes, F70x14 raised white letter tires, handling package, heavy-duty cooling, and the ram-air induction system) for $298.85, or including the 390 engine for $383.90.

Also new, the front double wishbone suspension had ball joints, upper and lower control arms, coil springs, and shock absorbers above the upper control arms; as well as trailing struts on the lower control arms. The "Magnum 500" road wheels were now standard, but the new "Machine" 15x7 inch slot-styled wheels became a mid-year option.

The interiors of the AMX were also redesigned. The broad wood-grained dashboard, center console, and two-spoke "Rim Blow" steering wheel were new. Tall bucket seats now featured a "clamshell design" integrating the headrests. Leather upholstery was $34 extra. The exterior rearview mirror featured a new design that sometimes matched the car's body color. The three "Big Bad" exterior paints continued to be optional on the 1970 AMXs, but they now came with regular chrome bumpers. A new "shadow mask" exterior finish applied over any available AMX color was a $52 option, which included a satin black-painted hood, engine compartment, front fender tops, and side window surrounds offset by thin silver striping. The optional "C-stripe" was $32.

The manufacturer's suggested retail price (MSRP) for the base model was US$3,395 (US$28,146 in 2025 dollars) as AMC promoted the 1970 AMX as, "A sports car for the price of a sporty car."

Motor Trend summed up a road test of a 1970 AMX with the 390 engine as "one of the better-constructed cars around." Described as "the best version yet of this blend of muscle car and sports car", the 1970 model was also the last "true AMX".

== Performance figures ==
Original road test of a 390 AMX by Car and Driver (1968)

- 0 to 60 mph (97 km/h) = 6.6 seconds
- 0–100 mph = 16.3 seconds
- Dragstrip 1/4 mile (402 m) acceleration = 14.8 seconds at 95 mph (153 km/h)
- Top speed = 122 mph (196 km/h)

Original road test of a 390 AMX by Motor Trend (December 1969)

- 0 to 60 mph (97 km/h) = 6.56 seconds
- Dragstrip 1/4 mile (402 m) acceleration = 14.68 seconds at 92 mph (148 km/h)

=== Racing ===
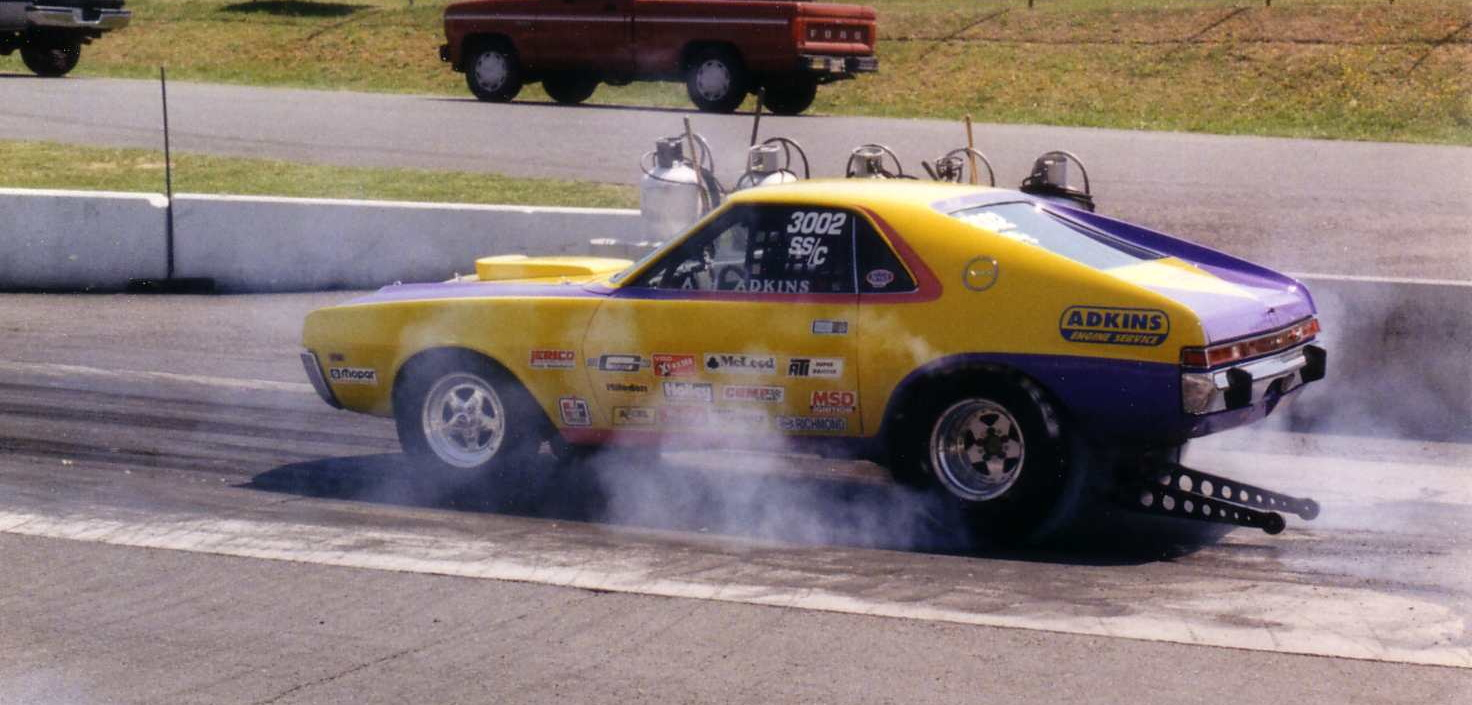
AMX drag car doing a burnout

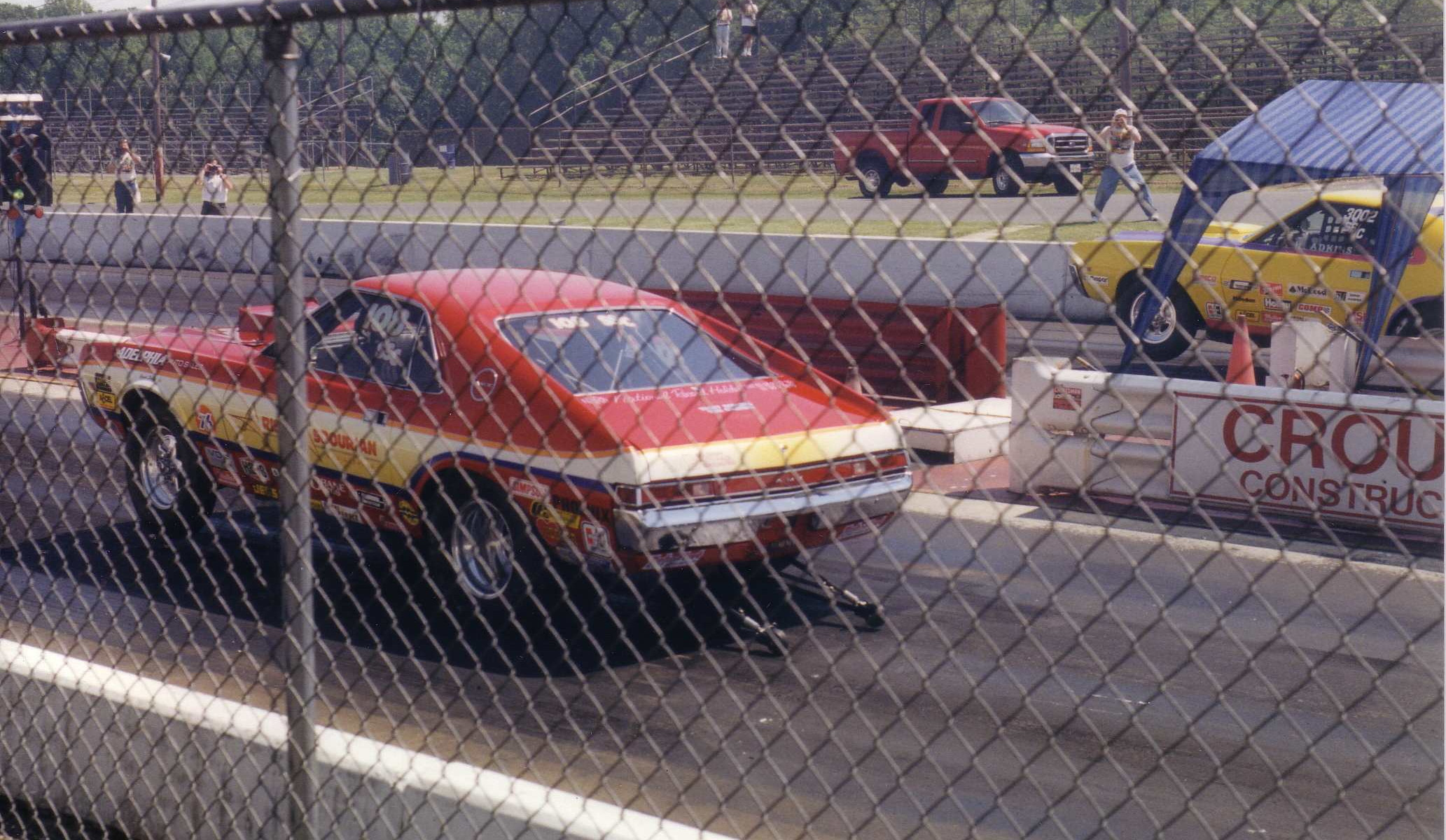
Two AMX dragsters taking off

As an American-built two-seater, the AMC AMX was a high-performance car with few equals. They were campaigned with factory support and by independents in a variety of road and track racing series as well as being classified as grand tourers.

The cars were regular performers on dragstrips across the United States. Drivers included Shirley Shahan, better known as the "Drag-On Lady", and Lou Downy. National Hot Rod Association (NHRA) champion Wally Booth raced AMXs in both the Super Stock and the Pro Stock classes. Herman Lewis, often described "as 'the Godfather of AMC Racing' ... won 200 events in his hellacious red, white, and blue AMX."

The 1968 and 1969 AMXs with AMC's 390 cu in (6.4 L) engines compete in contemporary Nostalgia Super Stock drag racing. Owners have also modified AMXs to compete in modern Pro Touring car racing.

The Sports Car Club of America (SCCA) classed the AMX in B Production for amateur competition, the same class as the Shelby GT350. An AMX scored second place in the 1969 SCCA national championship. Dwight Knupp drove his AMX just 1 minute and 14 seconds behind a Corvette's winning average of 102.385 mph (165 km/h) on 30 November 1969, at the Daytona International Speedway with 16 cars in the B production class, and placed sixth overall out of the total of 28 A and B class cars competing in the race. The two-seat AMX was never eligible for SCCA Trans-Am competition.

A 1969 AMX was entered in the 1971 and 1972 Cannonball Baker Sea-to-Shining-Sea Memorial Trophy Dash, an unofficial automobile race from New York City and Darien, CT, on the US Atlantic (east) coast, to Redondo Beach, a Los Angeles suburb on the Pacific (west) coast. A team of enthusiastic brothers, Tom and Ed Bruerton, finished the 1971 competition in fifth place. They drove 2,897 miles (4,662 km) in 37 hours and 48 minutes at an average of 77.3 mph (124 km/h), with no speeding tickets. Their AMX already had 90,000 miles (144,841 km) on the odometer and the brothers had previously taken it on numerous endurance rides, including "a rocky ride the entire length of the Baja California Peninsula." They again entered "their battlescarred AMX one more time" in the 1972 run. The brothers finished in eighth place, making the coast-to-coast outlaw race in 39 hours and 42 minutes at an average of 72.3 mph (116 km/h).

== Production ==
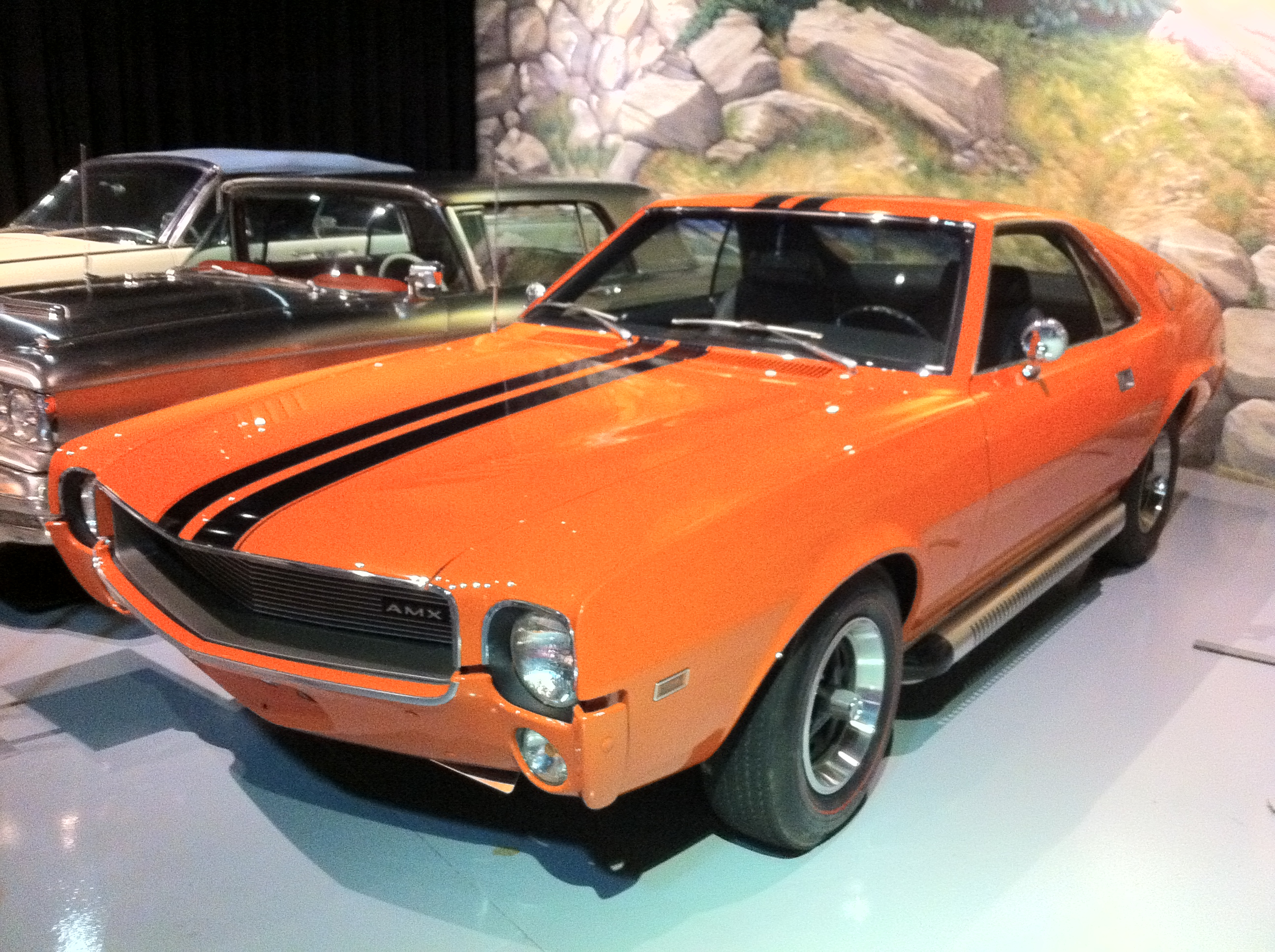
1969 AMX in "Big Bad Orange" with 390 Go-Package at the AACA Museum

The two-seat AMX was built for three model years following its debut as a mid-year model on 15 February 1968. The first 1968 model year cars were scheduled to appear in dealer showrooms on 19 March 1968.

AMC AMX model year production totals in the U.S., by engine and transmission:

	1968	1969	1970	Total
290 manual	525	619	n.a.	1,144
290 automatic	484	299	n.a.	783
343 manual	415	843	n.a.	1,258
343 automatic	902	729	n.a.	1,631
360 manual	n.a.	n.a.	836	836
360 automatic	n.a.	n.a.	747	747
390 manual	2,112	3,690	1,632	7,364
390 automatic	2,287	2,183	901	5,371
Model year and grand totals	6,725	8,293	4,116	19,134

In 1969, American Motors showed the next generation AMX/2 concept car in the automobile show circuit. As the two-seater AMX production ceased in 1970, AMC was developing a sophisticated European-engineered alternative, the AMX/3 for 1971 introduction. However, overall economic conditions changed with spiraling inflation pushing sales of smaller cars along with the insurance companies' decision to penalize high-powered automobiles resulting in decreasing the sports-type car market segment, and the AMX was made into a high-performance model of the 4-seat Javelin starting in 1971.

=== Assembly in Australia ===
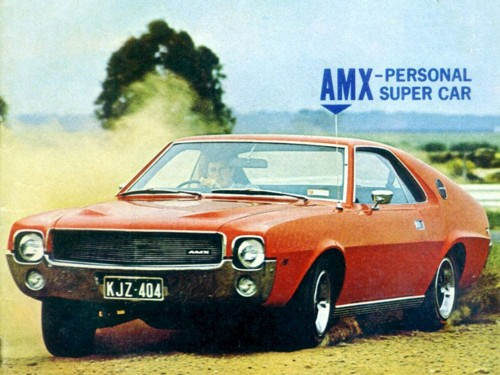
1969 Rambler AMX assembled by AMI

A total of 24 right-hand drive 1969 model-year AMXs were hand-assembled under license in Australia by Australian Motor Industries (AMI) between August 1969 and July 1970. They used the name Rambler AMX as AMI produced the Rambler range of cars since October 1960. Complete knock down (CKD) kits were shipped from Kenosha, Wisconsin to AMI's facilities at Port Melbourne in Victoria. Only three colors were offered: White, Safety Wattle Yellow, and Signal Red.

Differences to the RHD Australian AMXs (compared to the U.S. models) included different outside rear-view mirrors and black vinyl trim inside the "AMX" circle logo on the C-pillars. As with other Australian-assembled AMC models built in right-hand drive, windscreen wipers were not reversed, remaining LHD pattern, but the power brake booster and heater on the firewall were swapped over. Although the power steering pump remained in its usual left location, the remainder of the steering components were on the right side of the car. The cars came with 343 cu in (5.6 L) and automatic transmission, power steering, power disk brakes, "twin-grip" rear axle, and other items that were optional on the U.S. models. All Australian AMX interiors were finished in black and featured unique seats, door panels, and a fiberglass RHD dashboard with a wood-grained instrument cluster in front of the driver. The Australian AMXs came with a significant level of equipment and were promoted as "personal super cars".

== Concept and show cars ==
=== 1966 AMX ===
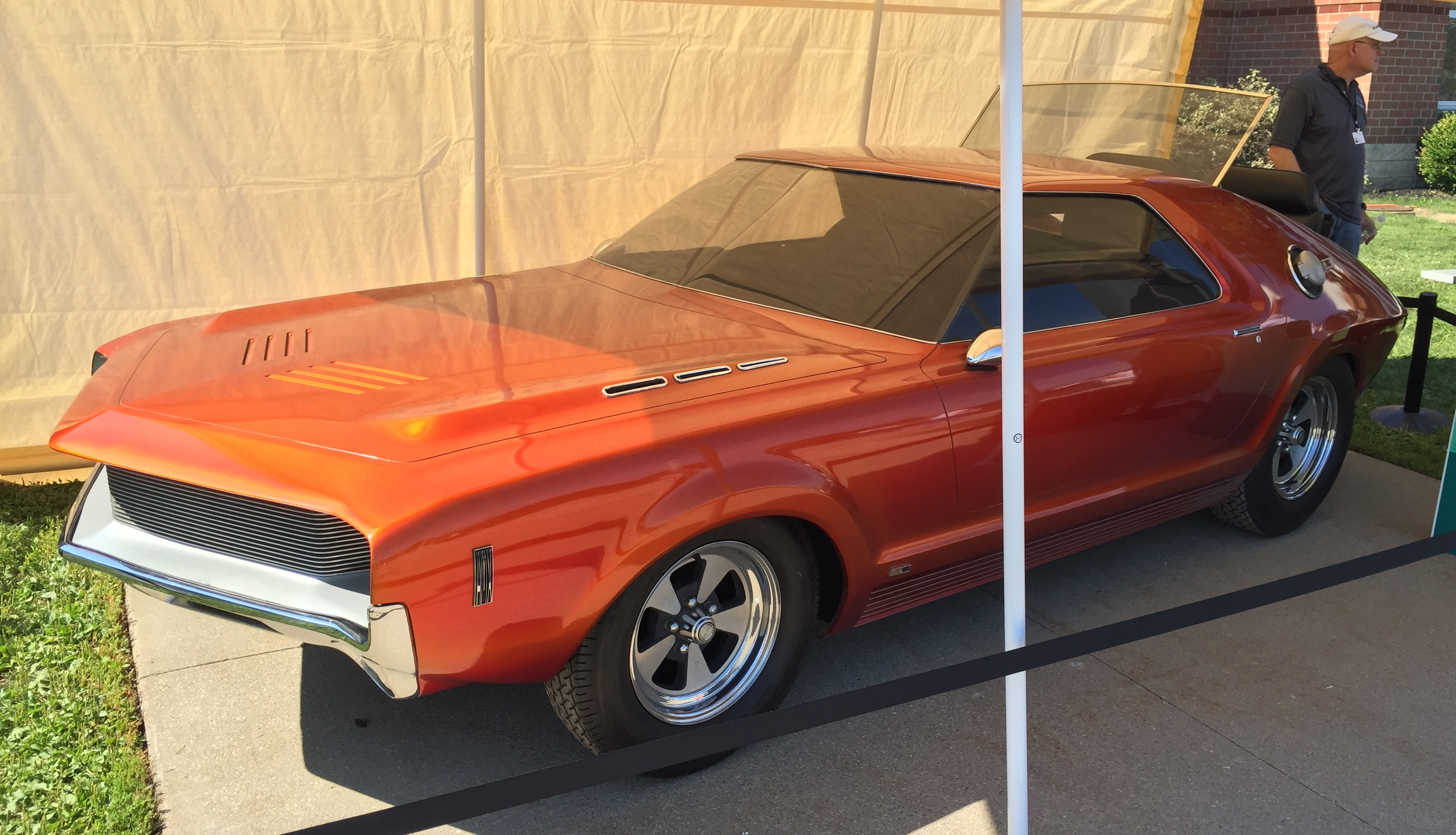
1966 AMX concept car

A concept car with a folding exposed rear seat was introduced by AMC at the 1966 Society of Automotive Engineers convention in Detroit. This was the first "AMX" (American Motors Experimental) named car. The sports car design features a rumble seat for two additional passengers that was described as a "Ramble Seat" in homage to the automaker's predecessor Rambler models. This back seat folds into the trunk space, and the rear window flips down, but these are not fully weatherproof designs. The roof design also has no "A" pillars, providing greater visibility. The fiberglass-bodied "pushmobile" concept has no interior, engine, drivetrain, or suspension. The concept was widely covered by the automotive media and the car featured on several auto magazine covers. It was painted orange or metallic blue to be shown on the auto show circuit. It received positive reviews that convinced management to put the car into production.

This 1966 AMX also gave rise to several other AMX show cars.

=== AMX I ===
A fiberglass-bodied AMX I concept car was made in 1966 to be part of AMC's "Project IV" exhibit. Built by Smith Inland of Ionia, Michigan, one of the two fiberglass-bodied concept cars was reportedly destroyed in a crash test convincing AMC's engineers and designers to use a traditional steel body. The remaining domestic-built fiberglass prototype features round headlamps.

American Motors' president Roy Abernethy sanctioned the Turin coachbuilder Vignale to construct an operational car in steel. It was a hand-built show car using a modified 1966 Rambler American chassis on a 98 in (2,489 mm) wheelbase powered by a 290 cu in (4.8 L) V8 engine. Delivered in 78 days and known as the "AMX Vignale", it was first displayed at the 1966 New York International Auto Show. The Vignale car features a "split-vee" windshield. This cantilever-type roof incorporates a built-in concealed roll bar, rectangular European-type headlamps, and a custom interior with full bucket seats flanking an aircraft-type console. The fully functional "Ramble-Seat" was operated by a push-button from inside the car.

=== AMX II ===
Vince Gardner, an outside consultant, designed the fiberglass-bodied AMX II, a less radical two-door for the "Project IV" exhibit. This four-passenger hardtop (no B-pillar) notchback coupe had little in common with the AMX I. This car featured a longer wheelbase and an overall length of 187 in (4,750 mm). The windshield wiper blades were concealed by a panel that raises when wipers are activated. The grille that was surrounded by a massive bumper had horizontal multi-bars with hidden headlamps. Safety innovations included doors that locked automatically when the engine was started, reflectors on the sides of the rear fenders, rear tail lamps that signaled the driver's intentions: green when the car is in motion, amber when the driver removes foot from the accelerator, and red when braking.

=== AMX GT ===
Developed for the 1968 auto show circuit, the AMX GT is a concept car based on a shortened and "chopped" Javelin with a Kammback rear end. The AMX GT show car provided design clues to future production models and performance options.

=== AMX-400 ===
In the late 1960s, George Barris made bolt-on customizing kits for the AMX that were marketed through AMC dealers. Changing customer preferences meant that traditional car customization was being replaced by quick bolt-on accessory personalization. Barris joined this trend by offering a variety of spoiler, body additions, and wheel options. American Motors requested Barris to provide enhancements for the Javelins and the AMX. Available through AMC dealers as complete kits or as separate items. The package included a performance hood, rear spoiler, grille, racing side mirrors, and unique wheels.

Barris also performed a radical custom treatment on a 1969 AMX. The car was built for the second season of episodes of the Banacek detective television series. It was a true custom for that time, and working with Joe Bailon, the car was lowered, and its body was heavily modified. Its roof was cut down almost 5 in (127 mm) and the car was lengthened by 18 in (457 mm). Featuring a sculpted body with louvered accents, it became known as the AMX-400. The car featured a taillight system that glowed green during acceleration, amber during deceleration, and red during braking.

=== AMX/3 ===
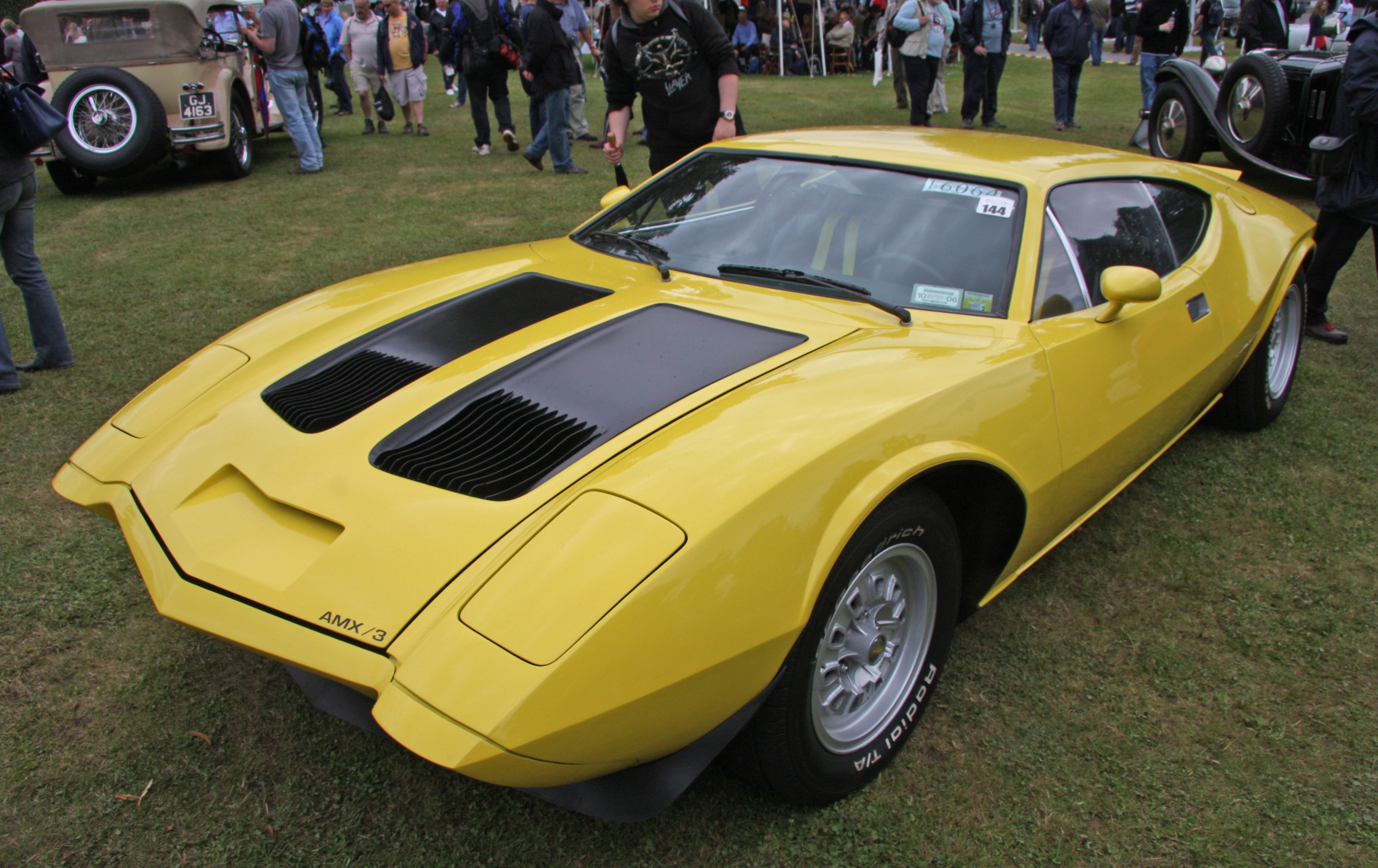
AMC AMX/3 concept car

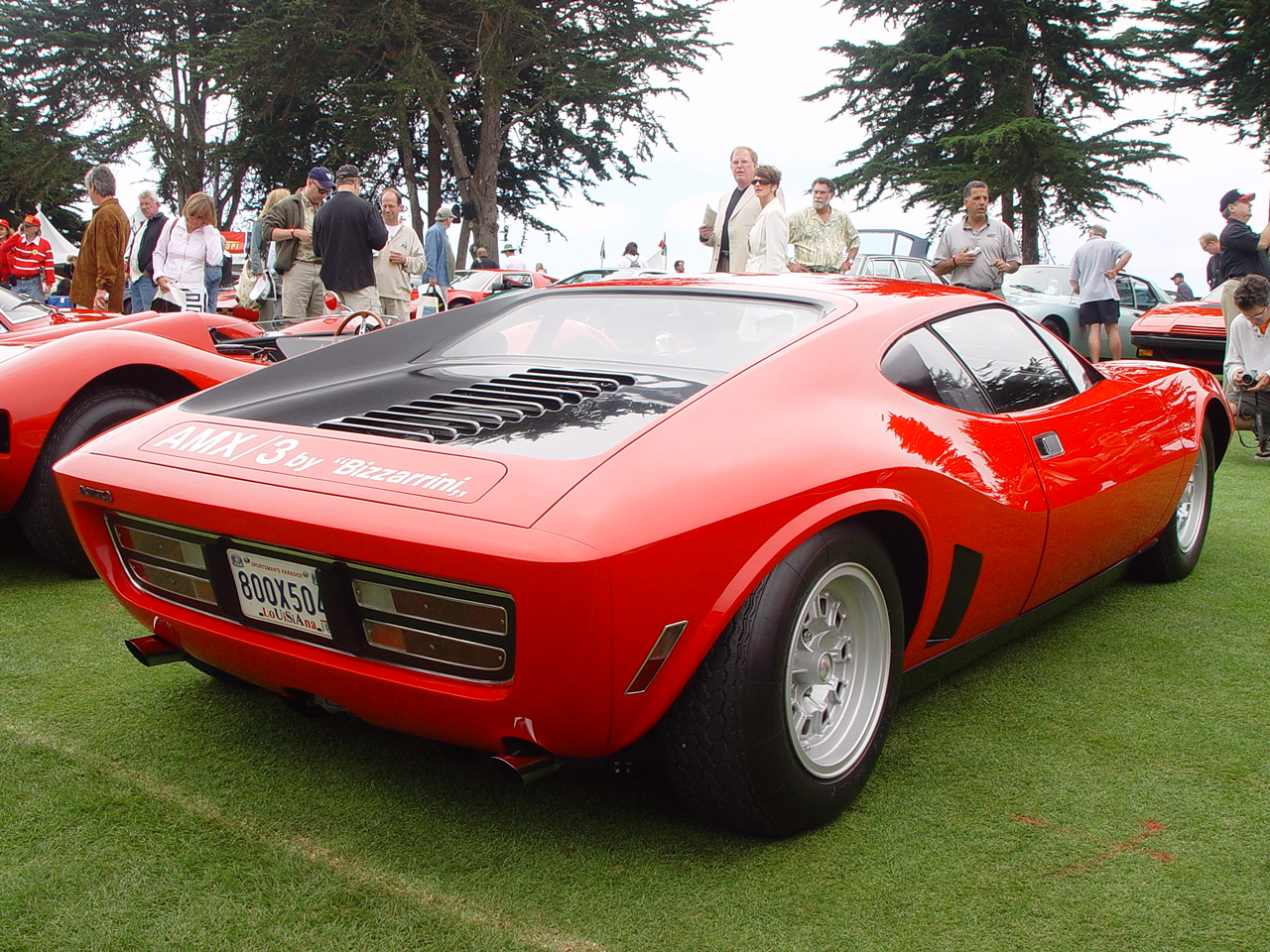
Mid-engined AMC AMX/3

A third-generation AMX concept car, the AMX/3, debuted at the February 1970 Chicago Auto Show. Engine-less and fashioned in fiberglass, the original AMX/3 prototype was a "push-mobile" show car only. Introduced in Rome in March 1970, the functional steel prototype was constructed by Giotto Bizzarrini, Salvatore Diomante, and Giorgetto Giugiaro of Italdesign.

American Motors placed an order for 30 operational cars. The AMX/3 body mold was sent to Italian grand tourer maker Giotto Bizzarrini, whose Turin facility hand made driveable mid-engined, steel-bodied cars. Built on a 105.3 in (2,675 mm) wheelbase, the Bizzarrini prototypes used the AMC 390 cu in (6.4 L) V8 and an Italian OTO Melara four-speed transaxle. The AMX/3 is considered one of Bizzarrini's car-masterpieces.

The steel Italian cars differed from the original AMC design in having fewer but functional rear decklid louvers, louvered hoods, and, in some cases, hood scoops to direct fresh air into the heating-A/C system. Further engineering improvements and road testing was done by BMW, which declared the AMX/3's chassis one of the stiffest having a 50% higher stiffness compared to a benchmark Mercedes-Benz model. The car's steel semi-monocoque chassis design with its welded on steel body provided a strong overall structure while the top speed was verified to 160 mph (257 km/h), with reports indicating the AMX/3 could go faster if it was not for the tendency for the front end to lift at those speeds, but BMW found the car to be most neutral handling they had ever tested. The BMW engineers also refined numerous components of the AMX/3 into "a world-class contender among the mid-engined super car elite of its time." One of the cars became known as the "Monza" after it achieved a top speed of 170 mph (274 km/h) in testing at the famed Italian race track."

Five completed cars were produced before the US$2,000,000 development program was canceled. The original projection by AMC called for building 5,000 AMX/3s per year, but the estimated retail price kept increasing. The AMX/3 was "beautiful and sleek, the kind of car that would have made hearts race in the day" and was to be a "flagship or halo car" to lure customers to AMC dealerships, "where they would often end up with other, more practical models." However, escalating costs and pending bumper regulations put a stop to the mid-engined AMX/3.

Some remaining parts from the canceled, second group of five cars were used by erstwhile Bizzarrini collaborator Salvatore Diomante to assemble the sixth car, named and marketed as Sciabola. Additionally, an open two-seat Spider featuring no weather protection was built in the 1990s using an unfinished AMX/3 modified chassis and the 7th AMX/3, on display at the Autoworld Museum in Belgium, were both finished by Giorgio Giordanengo.

=== 1971 Teague AMX ===
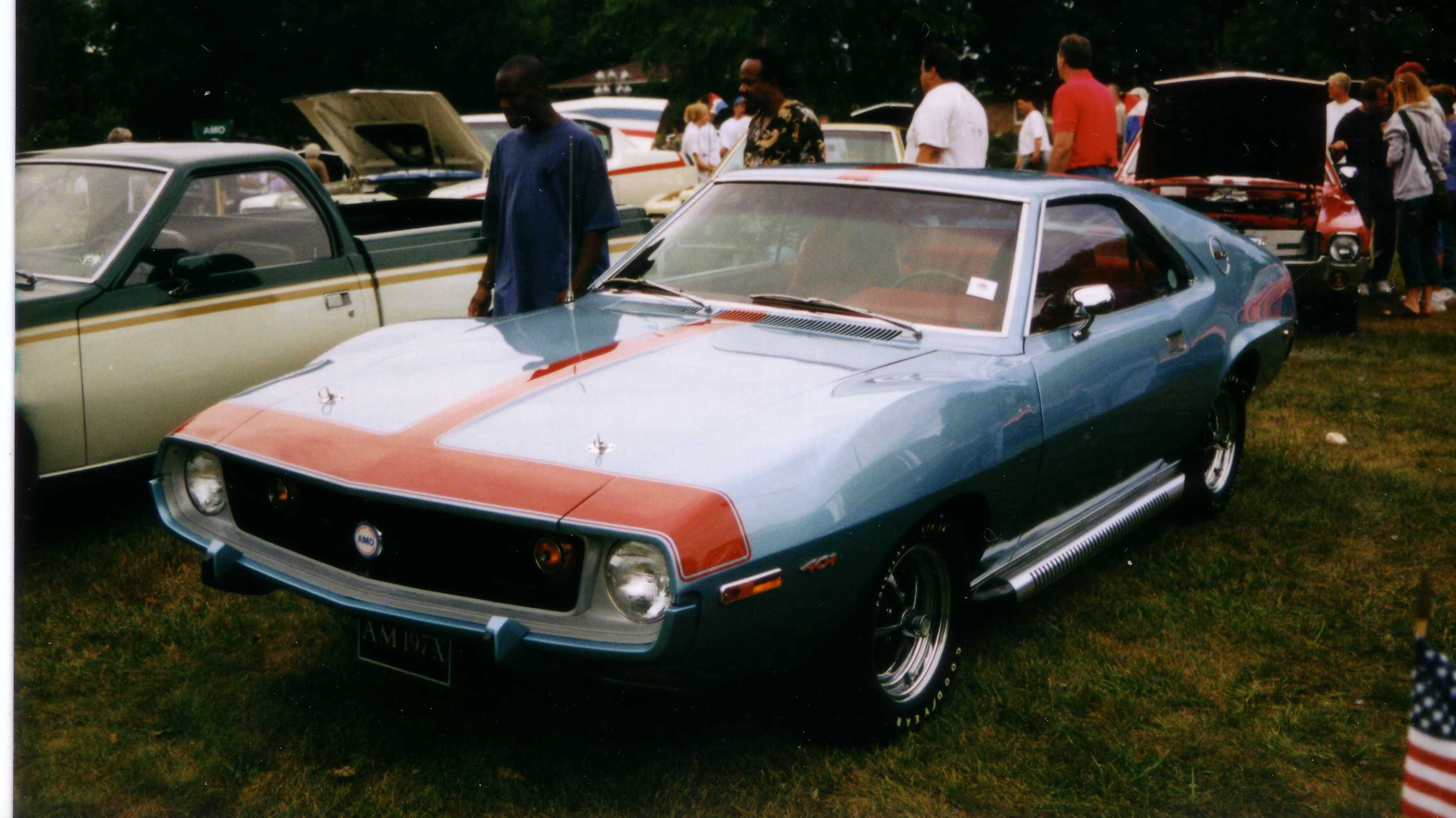
1971 AMX concept car

Sales of the two-seat AMX were lower than the numbers AMC executives wanted. Still, AMC's vice president for styling, Dick Teague, wanted to continue the sports model. American Motors' Advanced Design Studio made design proposals for a 1971 AMX and Teague requested – and received permission – to produce a fully working concept car.

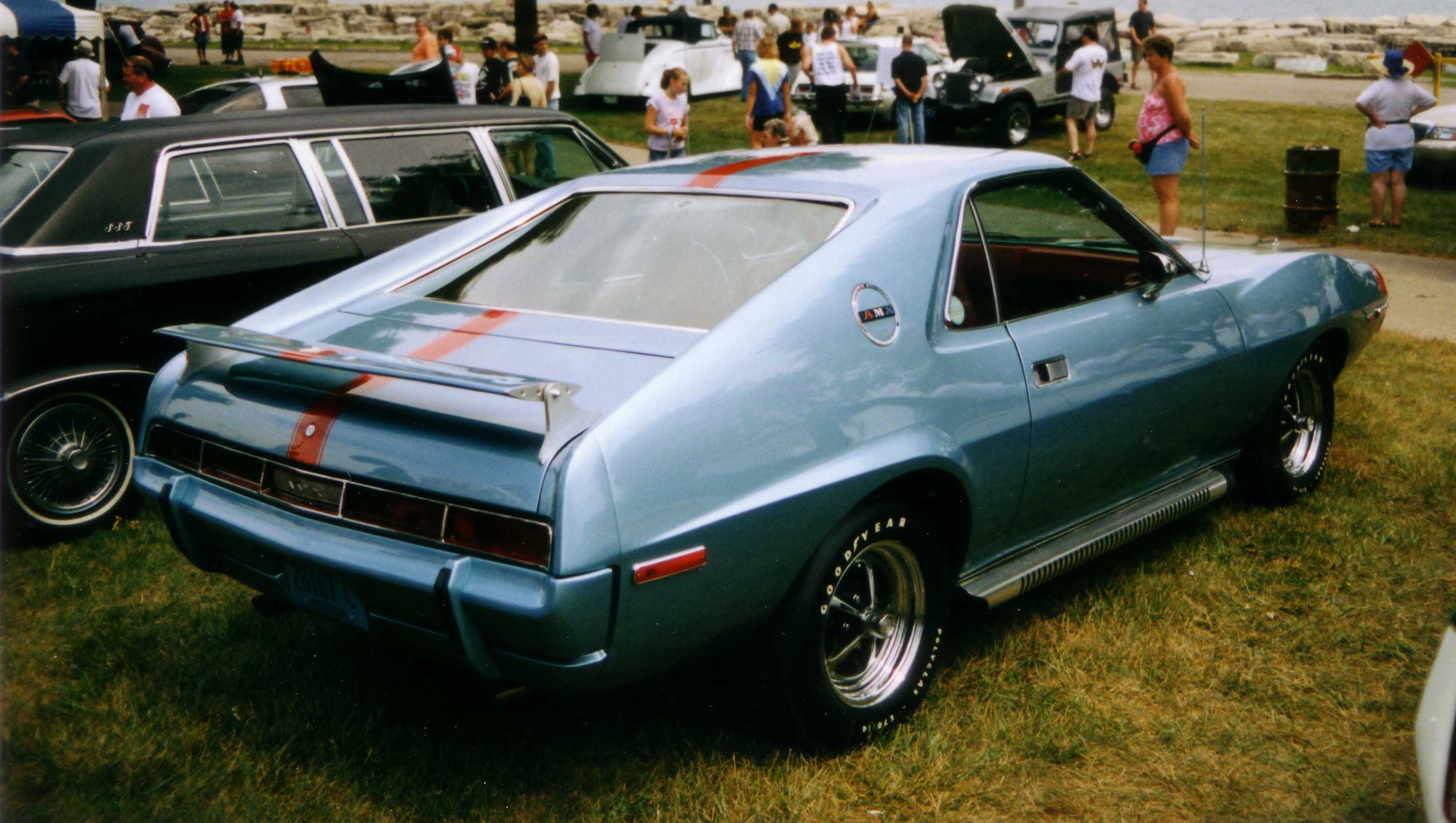
Teague's two-seat 1971 AMX

Starting with a Frost White 1968 AMX coupe as the development mule, Teague updated its front end to the grille and swooping front fenders of what was incorporated into the production 1971 Javelin. The concept car also featured the interior to what was to become AMC's characteristic high-backed bucket seats and corduroy upholstery introduced in 1970. The concept car was repainted light metallic blue with red striping to match the interior. A short-wheelbase, two-seat 1971 AMX was not approved for production by the automaker, but Teague used this car as his daily driver.

== Legacy ==
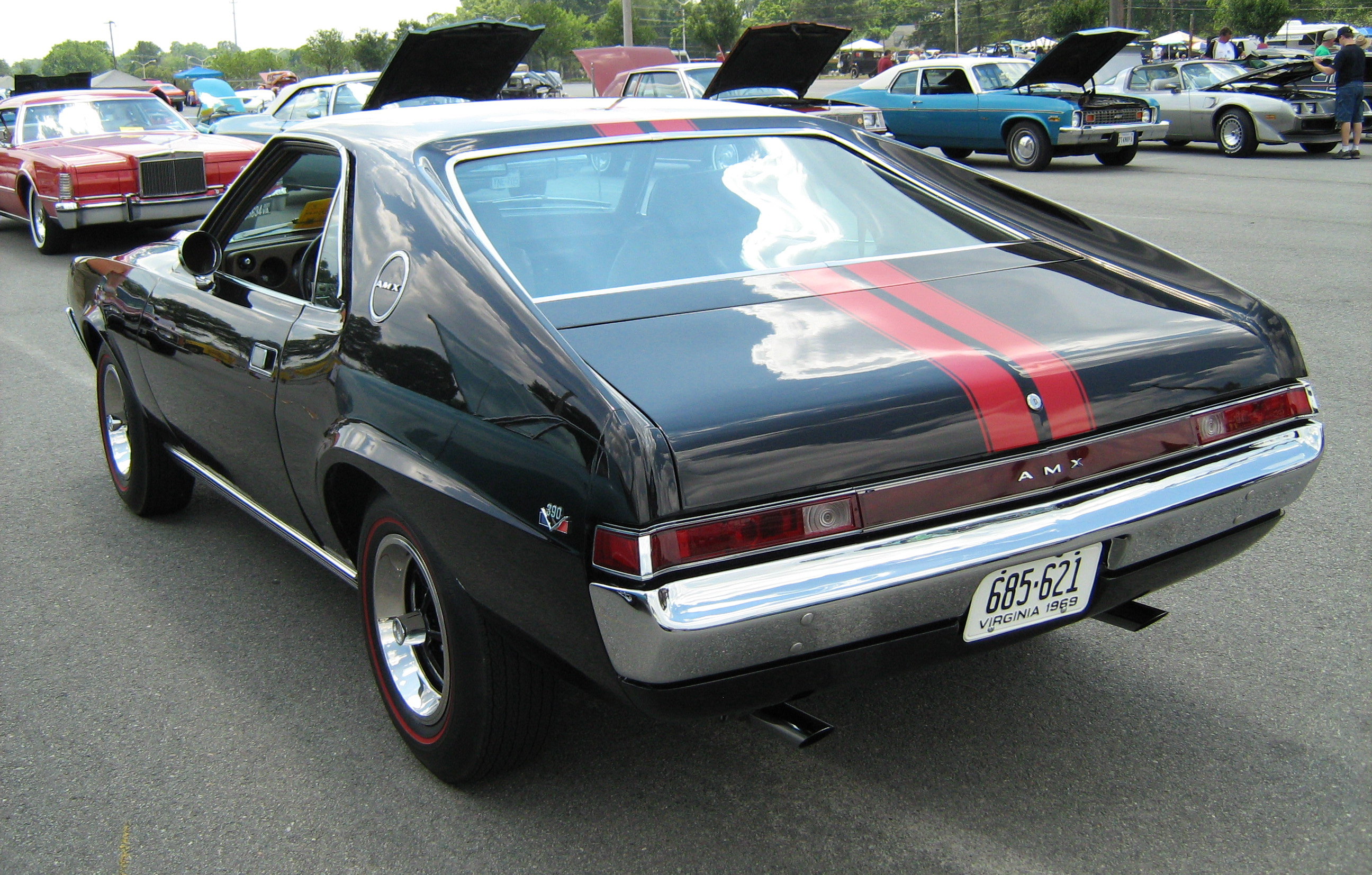
Stock 1969 AMX at AACA car show

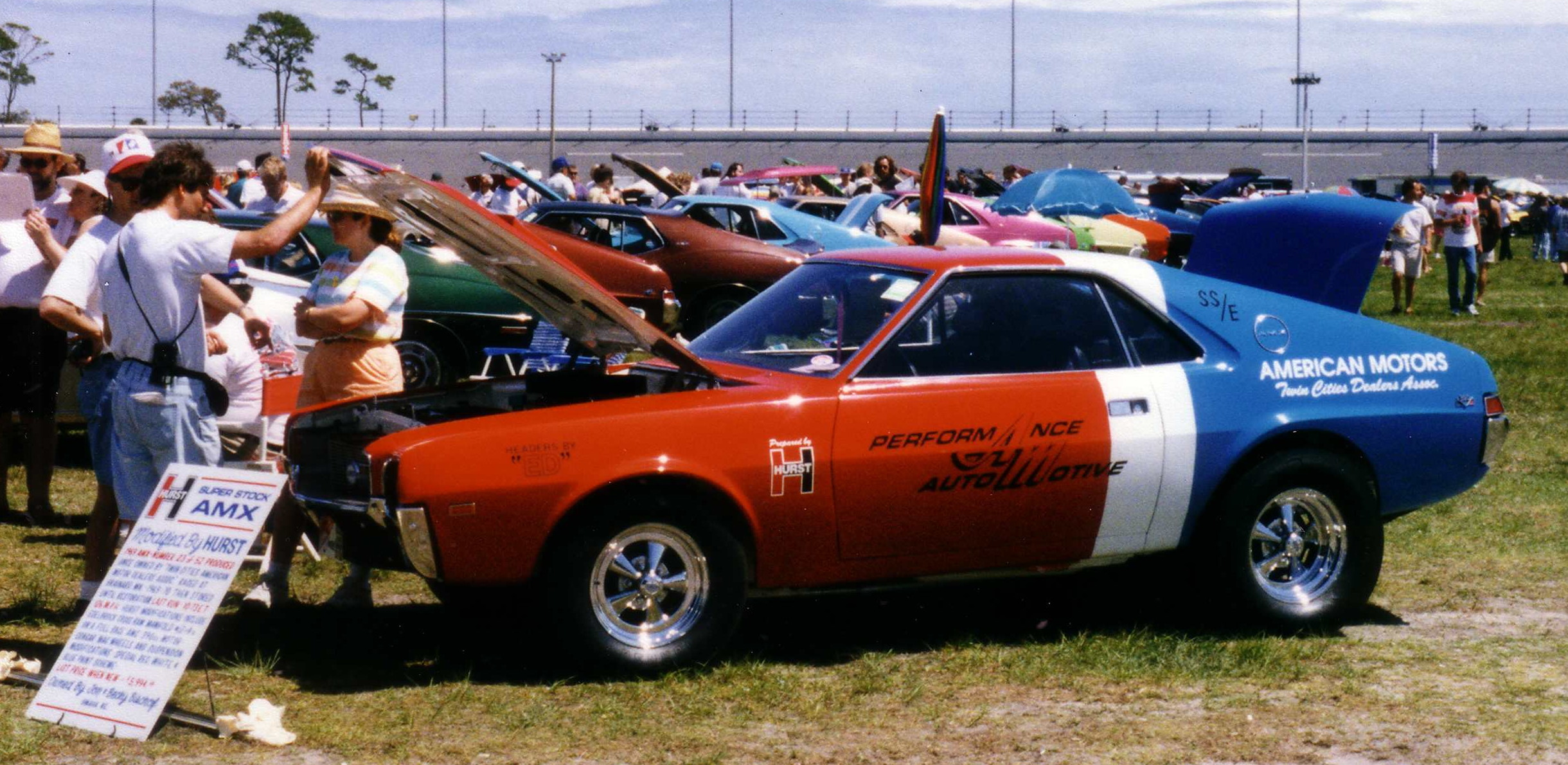
1969 SS Hurst (documented car#23) "Performance Automotive" at Daytona Florida show

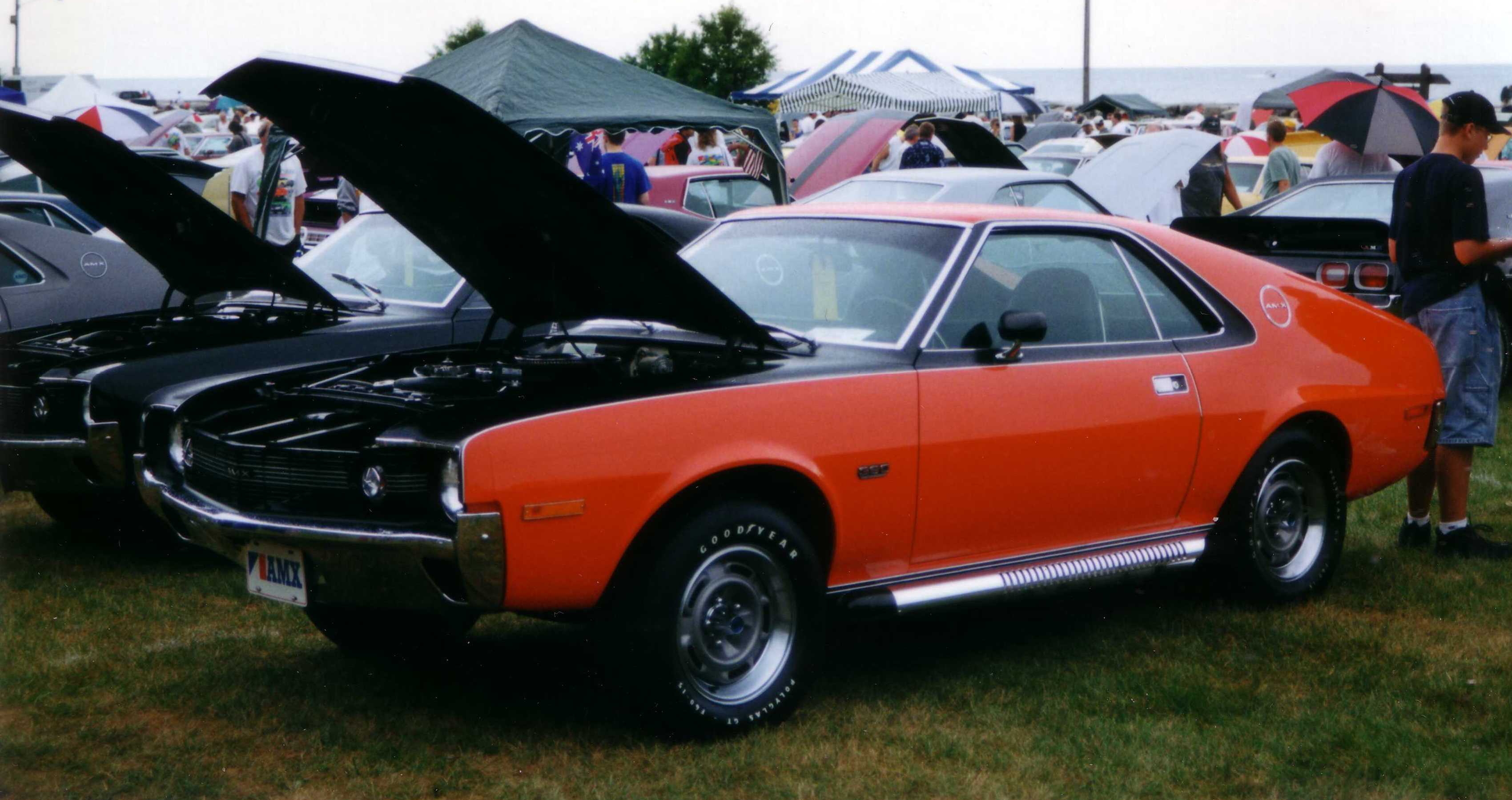
Stock 1970 AMX with BBO and "shadow mask" finish at a car show

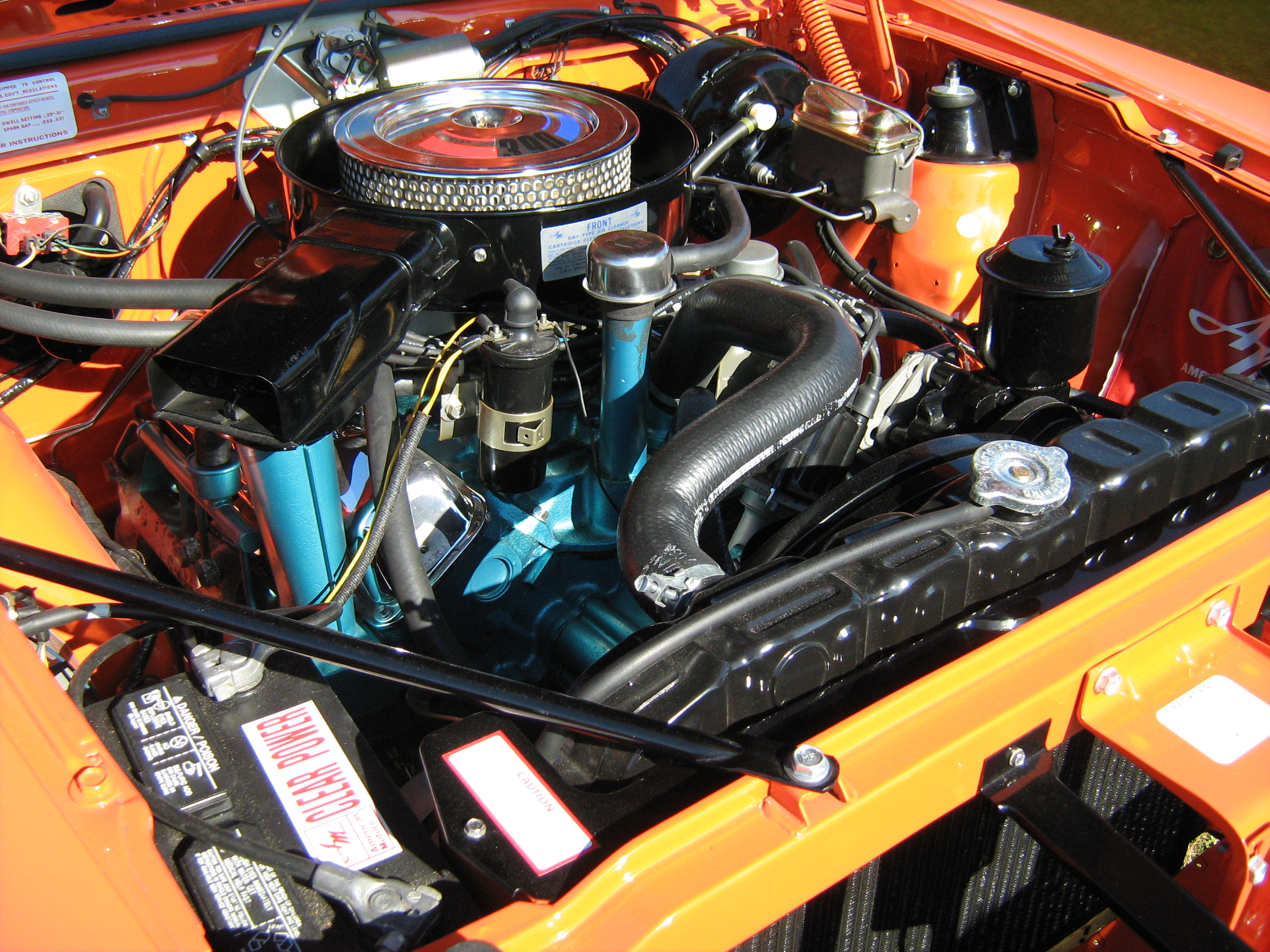
Stock 1970 AMX 390 engine at classic car show

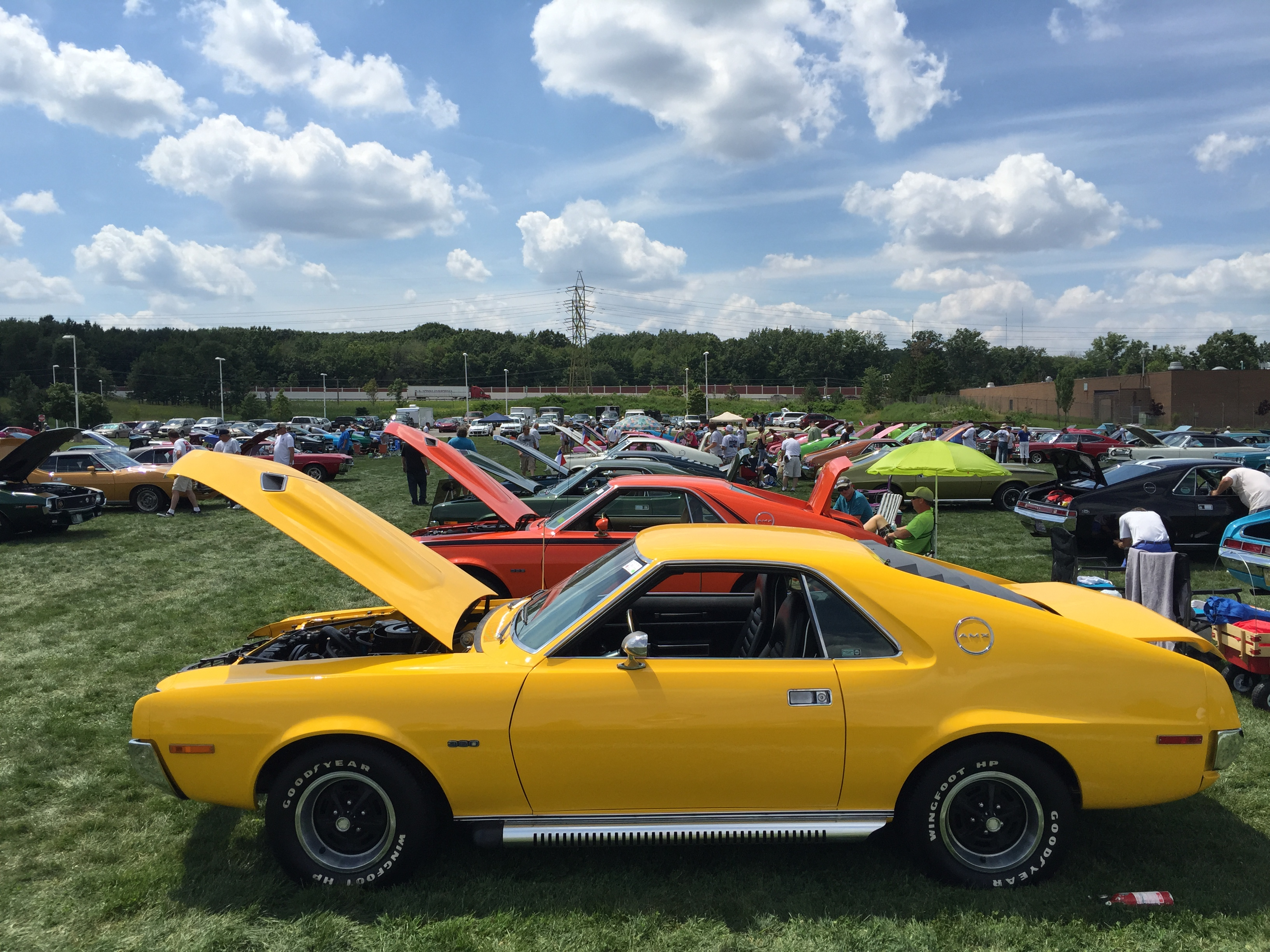
Stock and customized AMXs at an American Motors Owners Association meet

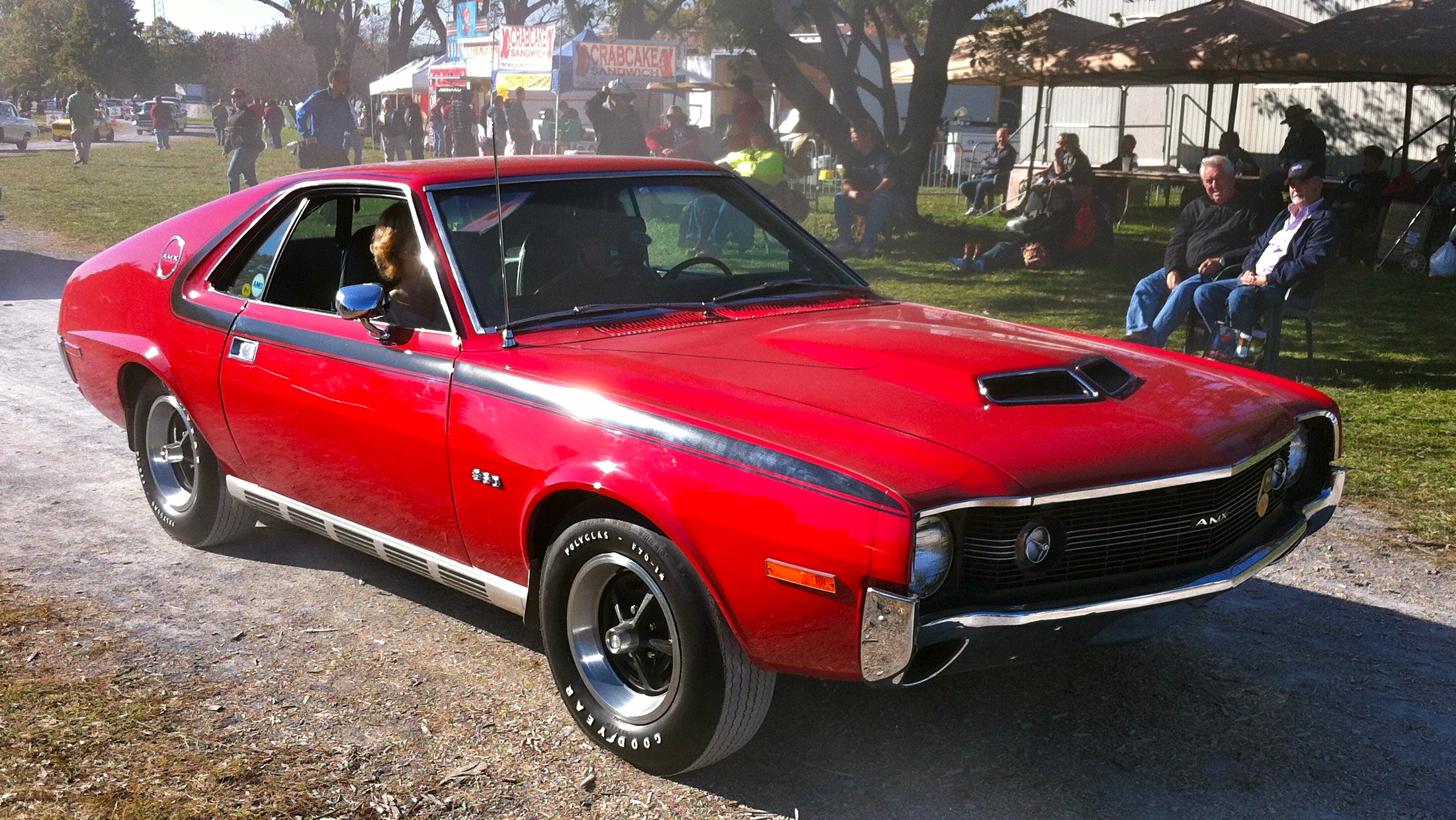
Stock 1970 AMX at AACA car show

The AMX was intended to be a “halo car” for American Motors. Another objective was "lowering the median age of visitors to AMC showrooms; in that role it was a major success" even though however the sales goals not achieved. The two-seat AMC AMX has been described as being "a perfect car for many who lusted for the Corvette but could not afford it." Developed under "austere budject" the AMX and the four-seat Javelin were designed to be radical departures from AMC's economy image.

Automotive journalist Patric George noted that the AMC AMX is "great vintage American iron" with only "two seats, making it more of a sports car than a lot of other muscle cars." Automotive historian and author Richard M. Langworth noted that the AMX has "all the right sports-car stuff" and that the "little machine that can only go up in value over the long haul."

According to CNN, before 2004, the AMX had been under-appreciated from an investment standpoint. In 2004, there was considerable variation between the values of two-seat AMXs and four-seat Javelin AMXs. Craig Fitzgerald mentioned "the satisfaction in owning a car that you don't see every single day, or on the cover of every single magazine." Fitzgerald favored the two-seater because of its rarity, but noted that some parts for either car were expensive.

In 2006, the editors of Hemmings Muscle Machines magazine said that AMCs had "experienced notable value increases over the last few years – especially AMXs..." The book Keith Martin's Guide to Car Collecting, in collaboration with the editors of the monthly Sports Car Market, lists the 1970 AMX as one of the picks under $40,000 among "Nine Muscle Car Sleepers".

Unique versions, such as the California 500 Specials and the 52 Hurst-modified SS/AMX drag race cars are perhaps the most highly sought after by collectors. In 2006, a California 500 AMX sold for $54,000 at the Barrett-Jackson auction in Scottsdale, Arizona, while a regular AMX went for over $55,000 at the Mecum collector auction in Belvidere, Illinois. In 2007, Hemmings wrote that only about 39 of the original SS/AMX turn-key race cars may have survived.

By 2007, the AMX was "among the most highly sought AMC cars" and "really taking off in the muscle-car market". Also in 2007, Hemmings said that the two-seater AMX had "a strong following among old car hobbyists and collectors of historic vehicles and nearly every one of the 19,134 built...remains in circulation and in demand, ensuring a good future for the first-generation AMX as a collectible muscle car." The 2007 book Classic Cars states that AMC's small and powerful AMX "had tire-burning speed" and "all have become collector's items."

Noting the increasing values of the 1968–1970 AMXs, Hemmings listed them among the "21 hottest cars" enthusiasts wanted in 2007 "and will want tomorrow."

In 2008, Hemmings wrote buyers had "only recently 'discovered' the AMX; they're now snapping them up left and right. Prices ... are on the rise, though they still represent a relative bargain compared to many more common muscle machines."

In 2010, Hemmings Classic Car included the two-seat AMXs in their list of 32 best cars to restore in terms of economic sense after factoring purchase price, parts availability, as well as restored value and desirability.

Although low production, the AMX shared parts and components with other AMC models. There are many active AMC car clubs for these cars. Parts, including reproduction components, are available. However, "AMC did not build cars in the vast numbers the Big Three did back in the day; therefore, there are fewer to restore and not as many parts to go around." As of 2010, Hemmings Classic Car wrote that the AMXs are "pretty basic" so they are not hard to restore, and that "reproduction parts are available" and continues to grow with many mechanical parts interchanging with other cars.

More valuable, according to automotive historian and author, James C. Mays, in his book The Savvy Guide to Buying Collector Cars at Auction, is the "wow factor".

The 100th issue of Hemmings Classic Car listed the "Top 100 American collector cars ever made" as selected by the editors of Hemmings Motor News based on "the most popular models among both enthusiasts and collectors" and included the 1968–1969 AMXs for both rarity and high interest, as well as "they boast sporting lines, traditional long-hood/short-deck proportions, and a smattering of performance options to add spice."

Old Cars Weekly describes the AMX as an "appealing little package for adrenaline junkies and guys ... who have an appetite for something a little offbeat and different ... a car that famed automotive scribe Tom McCahill once described as 'harrier than a Borneo gorilla.'"

=== Scale models ===
A variety of scale models of the AMX are available, including promotional 1/25-scale model manufactured under license from AMC by Jo-Han in factory colors. Hot Wheels offered a 1969 AMX custom in 1:64 scale, and in 1971 issued the AMX/2 show car model. Newer models in 1:18 scale diecast were issued, including the Playboy Pink version in the "Best of the Best" series, as well as the modified "Drag-On Lady" race car. According to the editors of Die Cast X Magazine, "muscle cars are the largest, most popular category in die-cast" collectors. They included the AMC AMX among the 34 models representing "the best and most important from the genre ... performance and style that are the hallmarks of the high point of American automotive history."

== See also ==
- AMC Javelin AMX: 1971–1974
- AMC Hornet AMX: 1977
- AMC Concord AMX: 1978
- AMC Spirit AMX: 1979–1980
- De Tomaso Pantera – first shown a month later, and sometimes confused with.
