= AMC Rambler Tarpon =

Concept car designed by American Motors Corporation

Rambler Tarpon
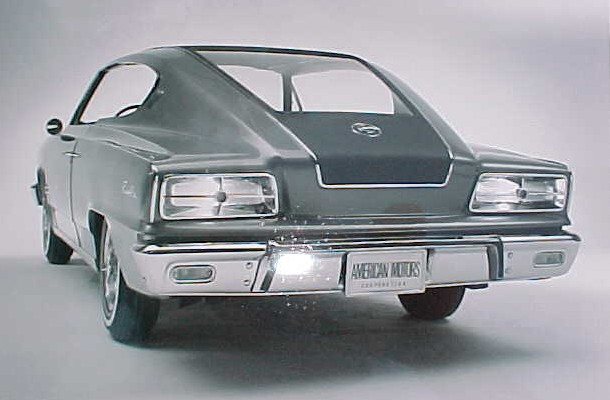

Overview
- Manufacturer: Rambler Division of American Motors Corporation (AMC)
- Designer: Chuck Mashigan; Dick Teague

Body and chassis
- Class: Concept car
- Body style: 2-door fastback
- Layout: FR layout

Powertrain
- Engine: AMC Straight-6

Dimensions
- Wheelbase: 106 in (2,692 mm)
- Length: 180 in (4,572 mm)
- Height: 52.5 in (1,334 mm)

The Rambler Tarpon was a concept car, a compact-sized sporty youth-oriented 2+2 hardtop coupé developed in 1963 by the Rambler Division of American Motors Corporation (AMC). The bright red with black roof design study made its public debut at the 1964 Chicago Auto Show. The car served to foretell the fastback design elements of the larger Rambler Marlin that was introduced in 1965.

== Design ==
The Tarpon was an "aquatically named" design study for a small rear-wheel drive two-door monocoque pillarless hardtop. Characteristic was its sleek, sloping fastback roof that narrowed as it met the rear bumper. The Tarpon featured two large, deep taillights flowing from the rear fender's shoulders. The show car was finished in red with a black vinyl roof accenting its clean shape from the windshield back to almost the rear bumper. The long roof portion design incorporated extended and sizeable rear quarter windows that ensured rear seat passengers in this 2+2 interior avoid claustrophobia. The smooth roofline was unbroken by the nearly horizontal rear window. Tarpon's fastback design "was on the cutting edge of a Motor City styling trend that soon included the Plymouth Barracuda, the Mustang 2+2, and the Dodge Charger."

In a 1991 book about collectible cars, automotive historian Richard M. Langworth described the Tarpon's sweeping roofline and "roughly elliptical side window openings suited the American's handsome lines to a T, and the pretty well-proportioned fastback looked a natural for showroom sale." The upward line that was at the bottom of the rear-quarter windows to apparently break up their visual mass has been viewed as the "single weirdest quirk of the Tarpon". The show car also had no trunk lid or outside hatch to access the cargo area. This would be addressed before production.

The Tarpon concept "generated much excitement at the Society of Automotive Engineers (SAE International) convention in January 1964." The concept was shown with the designers worked on a cutaway profile of the car on stage. The Tarpon then generated broad public interest as it toured the auto show circuit starting in January 1964. Its semi-boat tail roof design was accented with black vinyl first appeared at the Chicago Auto Show. The sales pitch for the concept was "A new car with sports flair." It was well received at automobile shows before the so-called "pony car" market segment was established. Some show attendees wanted to place orders, AMC dealers asked about production plans, and "Over 60% said they'd like to own a model with the Tarpon's fastback styling."

The Rambler Tarpon was also on display at the 1964 New York International Auto Show, as well as the Ford Mustang II (concept car), a design shown shortly before the production version was unveiled. Both concepts were targeting the increasing interest in small, sporty cars, and the purchasing power of younger customers.

== Development ==
The automobile marketplace was changing in the early 1960s "when many young, first-time drivers entered the market ... and bought cars with flair." Early in 1963, American Motors' management began the development of "a new car with a sports flair" to modify its image. Dick Teague's styling team devised an entirely new concept for AMC - a fastback design. He had a passion for pre-World War II automobiles and had a "passion for taking old styling and making it new again." He observed the 1963 Chevrolet Corvette spit-window coupe design and the 1963 Ford Galaxie Sports Hardtop, which outsold the notchback models, followed the pattern set by Chevrolet's distinctive 1942 Fleetline two-door fastback body style called the Aerosedan and Nash's own Airflyte. Teague knew that his design team had to work with considerably smaller budgets than their counterparts at Detroit's Big Three (General Motors, Ford, and Chrysler). For example, Ford developed a handmade fastback roofline for its first-generation compact Falcon two-door sedan, named "Falcon Challenger III". The car was entered in the 1962 Nassau Speed Weeks and also displayed during the 1962 New York International Automobile Show. Ford also introduced semi-fastback designs for midyear 1963 featuring a lowered, sloping roofline along with a rear window to enhance aerodynamics. On the other hand, AMC did not have the corporate resources to undertake the significant investment that would require all-new tooling, so Teague's design team had to make imaginative use of existing tooling to create spin-offs from existing products.

The Tarpon was made on the compact-sized Rambler American's new design and platform already set for the 1964 model year. A convertible chassis was used 106 in (2,692 mm) wheelbase), but the Tarpon was slightly longer, 180 in (4,572 mm) compared to 177.25 in (4,502 mm) for the production Rambler American. The Tarpon's roof was lowered two inches making it only 52.5 in (1,334 mm) high for an even more dynamic look. The top section of the new Rambler Tarpon was made of reinforced plastic. The windshield was described as "bulbous" and the fastback roofline featuring a "skylight" rear window. The swept back, double-compound curved windshield further enhanced the Tarpon's low appearance. The Tarpon also featured polished 13-inch aluminum wheels. The standard production road wheels on Rambler Americans were 14-inch, so the smaller versions made the show car lower. The interior had a complete set of dial-type gauges under a padded dash, a deep-dish aluminum steering wheel rimmed in walnut, and custom bucket seats.

The Tarpon seemed to aim Plymouth's new Valiant-based Barracuda and the soon-to-be-announced Ford Mustang. Shown before the introduction of Ford's compact Falcon-based Mustang, AMC's Tarpon was "an instant success" as evidenced by surveyed potential buyers stating 60% would buy one.

The Tarpon did not go into production. At that time, AMC was still developing its "GEN-2" lightweight V8 engine to fit the small Rambler American chassis. If produced, the Tarpon would have been a competitor to the Plymouth Barracuda, a fastback derivative of the second-generation compact Valiant. Utilizing an existing compact platform would have paralleled the initial Mustang's design approach, where in which the chassis, suspension, and drive train drivetrain were derived from the compact Ford Falcon. However, AMC's market research indicated that offering only a six-cylinder power plant would not satisfy the intended target market segment. The new V8 engine was introduced in 1966 in the sporty hardtop Rambler American model called Rogue. Moreover, AMC's CEO, Roy Abernethy, wanted the company to move away from the marketing image of Ramblers as being only small, economical, and conservative automobiles and designs. According to Abernethy, AMC's "main problem was its image lag — the fact that too many people still thought of American Motors as the builder of plain Jane compacts."

Under Abernethy's leadership, the company was introducing larger cars that had more options, prestige, and luxury. For example, the new convertibles and more upscale Ambassador potentially offered higher profits. Although the small four-passenger Tarpon anticipated a new market segment that later became known as the pony cars, the decision at AMC was to build its sporty fastback "image" model on the company's mid-sized or intermediate Classic platform. Teague recalled that "Abernethy had decided that instead of a 2+2 we would build a 3+3 sports-type car." The transformation from the 2+2 Tarpon into a six-passenger coupe was influenced by offering AMC's existing V8 engines and repositioning the car for "young married" couples.

The new production model, called Marlin, was introduced in mid-1965 model year. It added more "sport" to AMC's car line-up. However, the Marlin had a six-passenger capacity and was equipped with features as a personal luxury car like the Ford Thunderbird or Buick Riviera, rather than a competitor in the pony-car segment. Nevertheless, the production Marlin incorporated many of the design features that were the trademarks of the Tarpon show car. Because it was a much larger car, the Marlin had more pronounced shoulders extending laterally behind the rear wheels than the Tarpon's.

In 1965, three years before AMC's production pony car was unveiled, press reports described the compact-sized design as a "Tarpon-like fastback" built on the Rambler American's platform. The Tarpon "was the car that AMC could have, should have, but didn't make in response to the Mustang... Instead, AMC built the Marlin, which, on the larger Classic chassis, was too big to be a pony car, too slow to be a muscle car, and cursed with ungainly proportions due to the Classic's stubby hood." The automaker was niche marketing, offering a larger-sized product that its much larger competitors did not offer. Although the Tarpon show car pointed the way, AMC waited until the 1968 model year to introduce a small fastback, the Javelin, that was aimed directly at the market segment created by Ford's Mustang.

== Designers ==
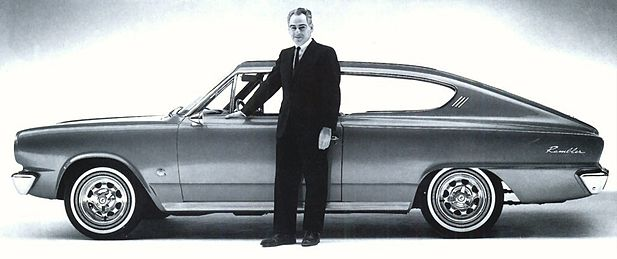
AMC press release photograph -- Tarpon with AMC designer Chuck Mashigan

Dick Teague headed the design team at AMC. Stuart Vance was the manager of engineering, a role that included body development and the prototype shop. Others involved with the Tarpon were Teague's right-hand man Fred Hudson (who later contributed to the Javelin), Vince Geraci (who contributed to the final look of the Marlin), Chuck Mashigan (Advanced Studio manager), Robert Nixon, Jack Kenitz, Donald Stumpf, Neil Brown Jr., Bill St. Clair, Jim Pappas, as well as Jim Alexander (who designed the interior). Teague selected the names for both the Tarpon show car and the production Marlin.

Teague worked at AMC for 26 years. He was responsible for some of AMC's timelessly beautiful and advanced vehicles, as well as for some of the company's disappointments. After his retirement as vice president at AMC, Teague described the development of the fastback design:

"... We originally had a car called the Tarpon, which should have been produced ... it was really a neat car, a tight little fastback. We showed it to the S.A.E. (Society of Automotive Engineers) convention (February 1964 in Cobo Hall in Detroit, Michigan) and everybody was steamed up about it! But the thing that killed the Tarpon was the fact that we didn't have a V-8 for it at that time.... [AMC president] Roy Abernethy didn't like little cars. Never did. He liked big cars, because he was a big guy -- hell of a nice guy. And he felt that this car was too small, so he said, "Well, heck, Teague, why don't you just put it on the Rambler Classic wheel-base? That way you've got V-8 availability, and you've got more room inside it." And then on top of that, he added an inch to the roof while I was in Europe. I still have never gotten over that..."

Teague was also responsible for the designs of AMC's compact Javelin that successfully targeted the market envisioned by the Tarpon, as well as the two-seat AMX.

== Legacy ==
The Tarpon was the direct fastback design influence for the 1965 through 1967 AMC Marlin.

Much later, the styling components of the original Tarpon design returned to a production car in 2004 in a fastback coupe with a distinctive design "that reminds more than one observer of the old Rambler Marlin." The principal appearance statements of the small two-seat Chrysler Crossfire include its "provocative boattail theme" in its fastback and rear end design. Automotive journalists noted the Crossfire's resemblance to the AMC Marlin featuring the Tarpon's rear-end. For example, Rob Rothwell wrote: "My first glimpse of the rear lines of the Chrysler Crossfire instantly brought back memories of one of my favorite cars, the 1965 Rambler Marlin"

The original Tarpon concept was destroyed. A tribute car to replicate the Tarpon has been built. The reproduction is based on a 1966 American which provides a bigger engine compartment compared to the 1964 version used for the concept car. The replica was built using a Rambler American convertible to which the roof from a 1965 Marlin was added. This clone Tarpon version is powered by AMC's 343 cu in (5.6 L) four-barrel "GEN-2" V8 engine with a manual four-speed transmission.
