= Dick Teague =

American automotive designer

- Richard Teague at AMC during the 1970s
- Born: Richard Arthur Teague; December 26, 1923; Los Angeles, California, U.S.
- Died: May 5, 1991 (aged 67); San Diego, California, U.S.
- Education: ArtCenter College of Design
- Occupation: Industrial designer
- Years active: 1948–1983
- Employers: General Motors; Packard Motor Car Company; Chrysler Corporation; American Motors Corporation
- Known for: Developing the concept of interchangeable body panels for use among different models
- Notable work: 1955–1956 Packard; Oldsmobile Rocket; Rambler Classic; AMC Cavalier; AMC Gremlin; AMC Javelin; AMC AMX; AMX GT; AMC Hornet; AMC Eagle; Jeep Cherokee (XJ); AMC Pacer
- Awards: EyesOn Design Lifetime Design Achievement; Automotive Industries Man of the Year

Richard Arthur Teague (December 26, 1923 – May 5, 1991) was an American industrial designer in the North American automotive industry. He held automotive design positions at General Motors, Packard, and Chrysler before becoming Vice President of Design for American Motors Corporation (AMC).

Teague designed several notable show cars and production vehicles, including the Packard Executive, many AMC models, such as the Pacer, Gremlin, and Hornet, as well as the Jeep Cherokee XJ. After Chrysler acquired American Motors in 1987, he also designed or assisted in styling later automobiles, such as the Jeep Grand Cherokee ZJ and the Neon.

== Early life ==
Teague's mother worked in the motion picture industry during the silent movie era. At five years of age, Teague appeared in five episodes of Our Gang, playing the role of Dixie Duval, a girl. When he was six, he was seriously injured in a car accident near Pasadena, California, which a drunk driver caused. He lost several teeth and suffered a broken jaw, as well as sight in his right eye (leaving him without depth perception or stereoscopic vision), while his mother was left an invalid. A year later, his father was killed in another automobile accident, also caused by a drunk driver.

While attending grade school in Los Angeles during the 1930s, Teague built model airplanes before turning to hot rods, since his schoolmates included Ed Iskenderian, a hot-rodder and later automotive entrepreneur, and land speed racer Stuart Hilborn, as well as other car enthusiasts. He participated in time trials on a dry lake northeast of Los Angeles and was fond of saying that he "had a little gasoline in his blood."

Teague was exempt from service in the armed forces during World War II because of his visual impairment. After graduating from Susan Miller Dorsey High School in 1942, he worked as an aircraft technical illustrator for Northrop Corporation. His boss, Paul Browne, was a former designer at General Motors who suggested that Teague take night classes at the ArtCenter College of Design.

== Early work ==
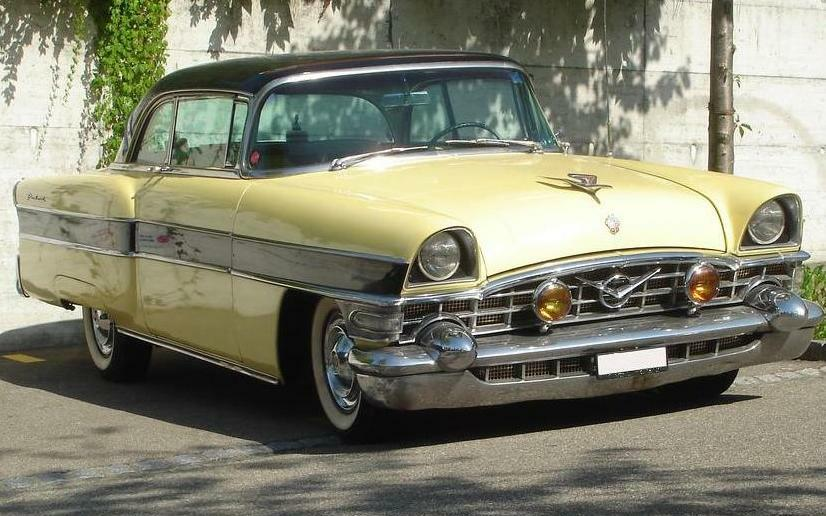
The last Teague design for Packard, the Executive

After World War II, Teague proposed a pre-Henry J economy car design for Kaiser Motors.

In 1947, he joined the General Motors design studios headed by Edmund Anderson, starting as an apprentice stylist and eventually moving up to the Cadillac advanced design group. He also worked on the 1950 Oldsmobile Rocket. The 1950s "saw some of the most beautiful and some of the most outlandish vehicles," and the head of the design department at General Motors liked chrome on cars. Teague described how GM stylists made two sets of overlay designs for Harley Earl to choose from. Both chrome trim sets had been put on one Oldsmobile prototype by mistake. Earl saw it and ordered it produced that way, although the stylists were horrified.

Teague was dismissed from General Motors in 1952 and joined the Packard Motor Car Company as chief stylist, following John Reinhart's resignation. His first work there was a minor facelift on the Packard line for 1953. Packard management, under James J. Nance, decided to relaunch the Clipper brand as a standalone make, separate from Packard. It was Teague who achieved the visual distinction between the two models. He also designed several Packard show cars. These included the 1953 Balboa (whose canopied reverse-slant and lowering for ventilation rear window later appeared on the 1957 Mercury Turnpike Cruiser, 1958–1960 Lincoln Continental, and several Mercury models), and the 1954 Packard Panther. Teague contributed with William Schmidt to the 1955 Request, whose principal designer was Dick Macadam.

The restyled Packard line for 1955 showcased Teague's keen eye for detail and ability to produce significant changes within limited budgets. However, the company was not doing well following the 1954 purchase of the struggling Studebaker Corporation. The last Teague design for Packard was the Executive, introduced in mid-1956 and derived from the Clipper Custom, which was launched just as sales of the luxury Packard line were collapsing. Teague also designed the last Packard show car, the Predictor, as well as a new Packard and Clipper lineup for 1957, which would have followed the general lines of the Predictor. The design was stillborn when, in mid-1956, the merged automaker shut down the Detroit Packard operations. Lacking funds for all-new models, Studebaker-Packard had to use existing and more economical Studebaker designs. Working with little time and money, the stopgap 1957 Studebaker-based Packard models became known as "Packardbakers." The 1957 Packard Clipper, popularly derided as "a Studebaker wearing Packard makeup", was designed mainly by Teague, and was intended as a temporary stopgap to keep the brand going until the company's fortunes improved and a "real" Packard model could again be made.

By 1957, the entire Packard styling team had moved to Chrysler Corporation and Teague became chief stylist. However, there was an acrimonious battle between the director of design, William Schmidt, and vice-president Virgil Exner, that made working difficult for Teague. He would later reflect in a Road & Track magazine story: "It was the worst 18 months of my life." Teague went to work for an independent design firm on non-automotive assignments.

== American Motors ==
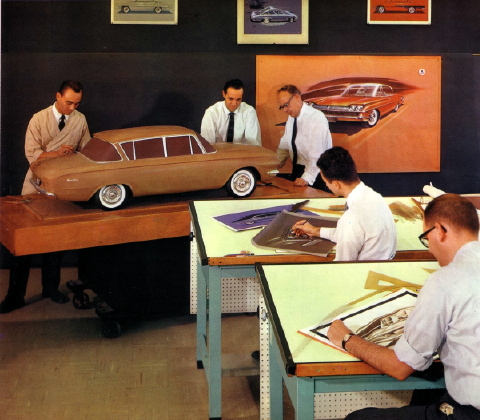
AMC designers, 1961: Teague stands by the scale model Rambler's left front fender

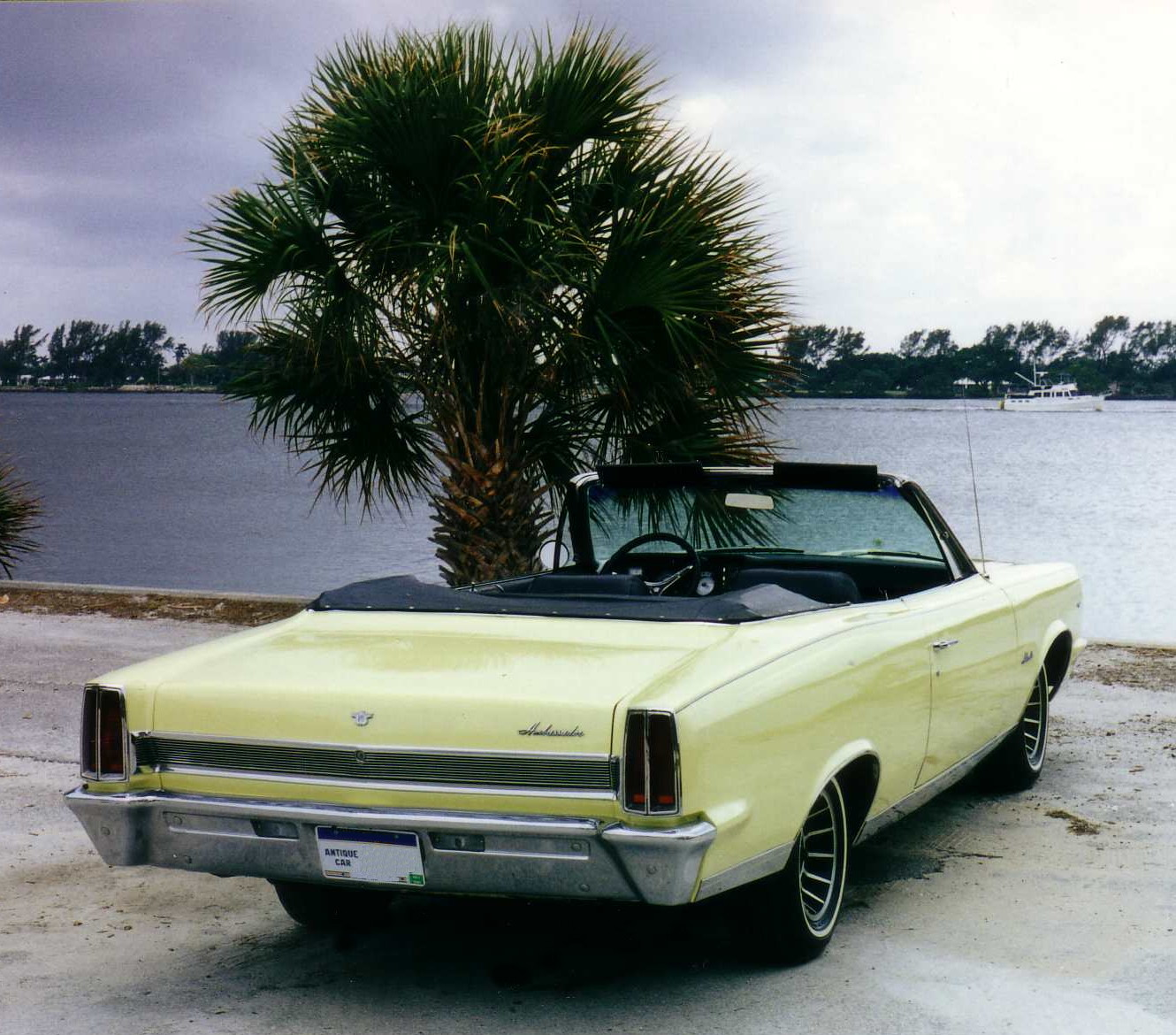
1967 AMC Ambassador convertible

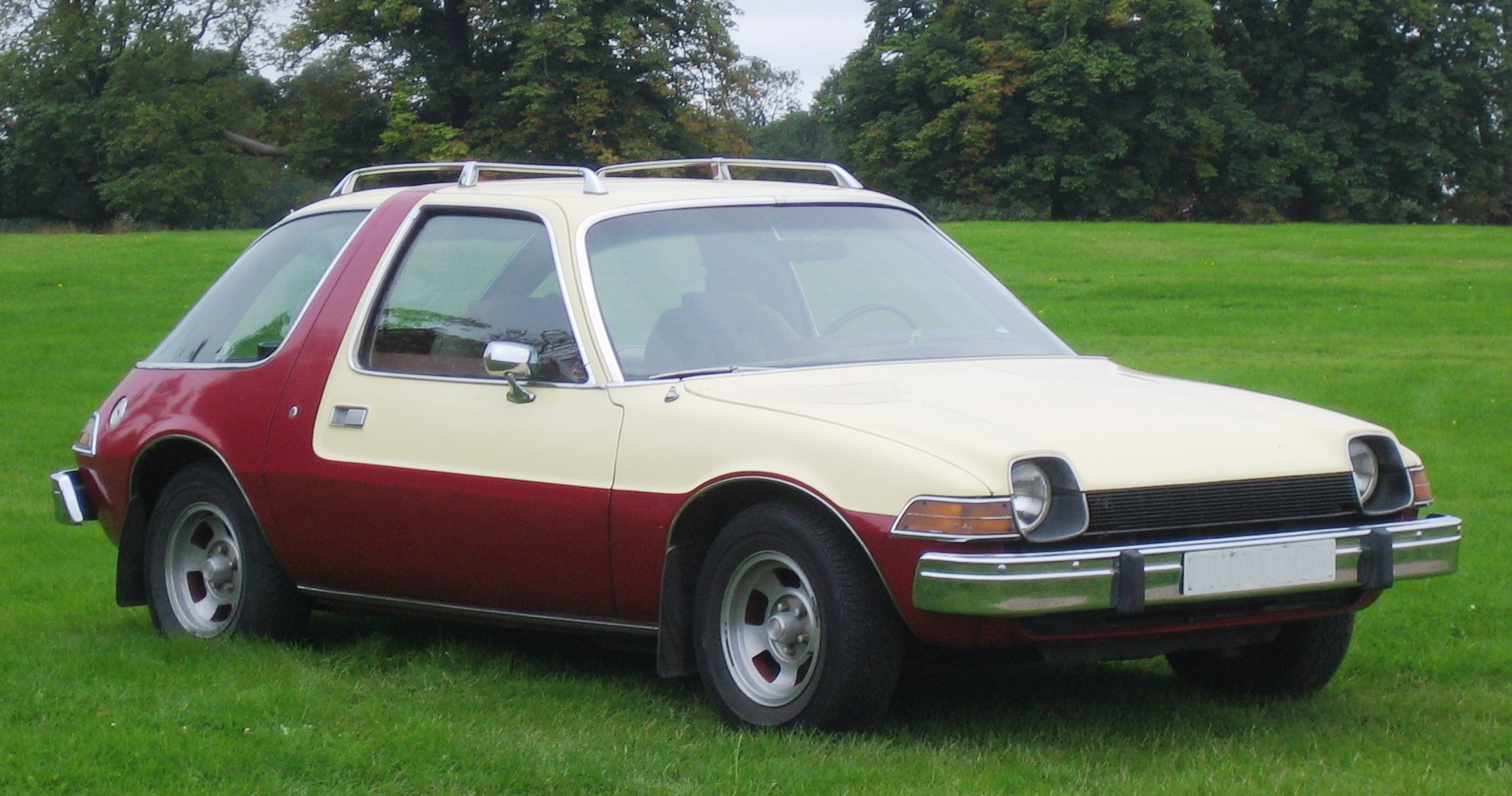
AMC Pacer 1975

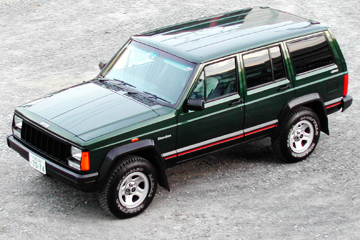
One of Teague's widely known designs, the Jeep Cherokee XJ 1983

Teague joined American Motors Corporation (AMC) as a member of Edmund E. Anderson's design team in September 1959. Teague's first assignment, according to designer James W. (Jim) Alexander, was to re-do the front sheet metal on the 1961 Ambassador. The first cars influenced by Teague's styling were the 1963 Rambler Classic and Ambassador, AMC's first all-new models since 1956.

After Anderson left AMC in 1961, Teague was named the director of styling. This was when AMC was "suffering from an image design problem". With the ascendancy of Teague in the early 1960s, "AMC Styling began to be written in a more positive manner" within the industry and automotive press. His first significant project was the Rambler Tarpon, a compact fastback that could have "conceivably matched Ford's forthcoming Mustang for pace and style" if AMC's president Roy Abernethy had approved it. He was promoted to vice president of styling in 1964. He held this position at the automaker until he retired from AMC in 1983. At his retirement, he joked that the only Detroit auto company he had not worked for was Ford.

Although he worked within tight budget restrictions at AMC, Teague sometimes referred to his time there as "Camelot". Designing several different cars from existing AMC stampings, he worked "relative miracles" compared to the spending norms in this industry. With little money to work with, he reconfigured the existing cars and parts in new ways. For example, he incorporated the doors from AMC's large-sized automobiles into his design for the new 1964 compact Rambler American.

The AMC Cavalier was one of the "Project IV" concept cars in the mid-1960s that demonstrated advanced techniques of interchangeable body panels and design symmetry. The right front and left rear fenders were identical, as well as the panels for doors, hood, and deck lid, all interchanged. The automobile platforms designed by Teague featured numerous interchangeable door skins, glass, and more. For example, the front and rear bumpers on the 1970 AMC Hornet were made from the same stamping. This design talent yielded significant cost savings for the company.

Teague's work on the 1967 through 1969 AMC Ambassador proved that he "could do more with less than most any other car designer around—usually because he had to." While the 1965 models were reskinned and rode on a longer wheelbase, Teague "came through handsomely with crisp, angular lines" that helped the Ambassador achieve record sales. The 1967 model year brought even more significant changes that were in line with Roy Abernethy's longtime aim of matching Big Three models on almost every front, including an all-new Ambassador that "emerged as one of the decade's unsung good-lookers."

After a management change at AMC, Teague worked under Roy D. Chapin Jr., who was also a sports car enthusiast. Teague developed production models that featured "excitement," such as the Javelin. This design evolved from two AMX prototypes that were part of the "Project IV" concept cars during the 1966 automobile show circuit. Other top executives, such as Robert B. Evans, wanted Teague's two-seat AMX design to be brought to the market "very quickly." Teague originated a non-running show car in late 1965, and since he was a "two-seater kind of guy, the production American Motors AMX was his car." The new models' offerings reflected AMC's strategy to shed its "economy car" image and appeal to a more youthful, performance-oriented market.

During the 1970s, "only a handful of cars had real personalities, and many of those came from the smallest U.S. producer, American Motors" under the direction of Teague. When the automobile market was changing to a greater focus on quality and fuel efficiency, Teague characterized the work by his design team at AMC as "We still want to make cars with charisma; cars that stand out from the pack ... the future means the large look inside, away from the claustrophobic."

In 1971, Teague proposed an innovative economy car incorporating a lightweight materials with front-wheel drive utilizing a compact Wankel engine. However, the 1975 production version of the AMC Pacer turned out to be different due to numerous constraints. Focused on making the car large inside, it is considered to be the first car with a cab forward design. It was also the first 'wide-small' automobile that "gave drivers the impression they were driving a conventional large American." Its "styling was different and appealing in an offbeat sort of way" featuring large amounts of glass. The Pacer's low beltline prevented the side door window from lowering entirely out of sight, so Teague designed the inner door panels with large bolsters." Anatole Lapine, the designer of the Porsche 928 body, was inspired by the Pacer.

American Motors was the smallest domestic automaker and had "to innovate or die" and this strategy was formalized by Chapin in the firm's "Philosophy of Difference" because it could not copy or compete with its rivals, but needed to go its own way by innovating market segments to survive. The company "produced some wonderfully creative and original designs". In the 1980, Teague unsuccessfully attempted to persuade AMC's board of directors with a minivan concept, a design formula adopted by Chrysler. Teague headed talented stylists that included Fred Hudson, Chuck Mashigan, Robert "Bob" Nixon, Vince Geraci, Norbert Ostrowski, and others.

== Teague designs ==
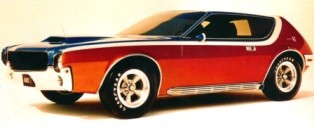
1968 AMX-GT show car

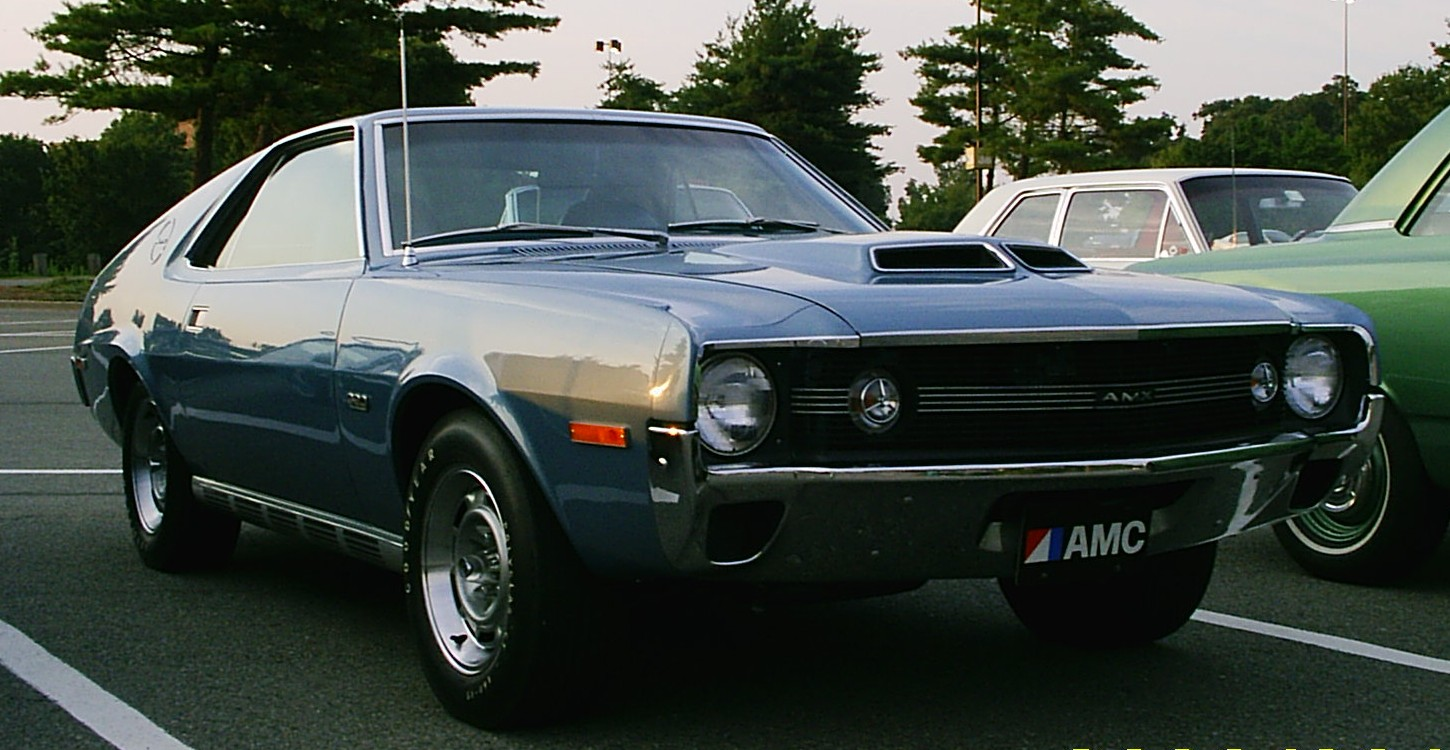
1970 AMC AMX 390 go-package blue front

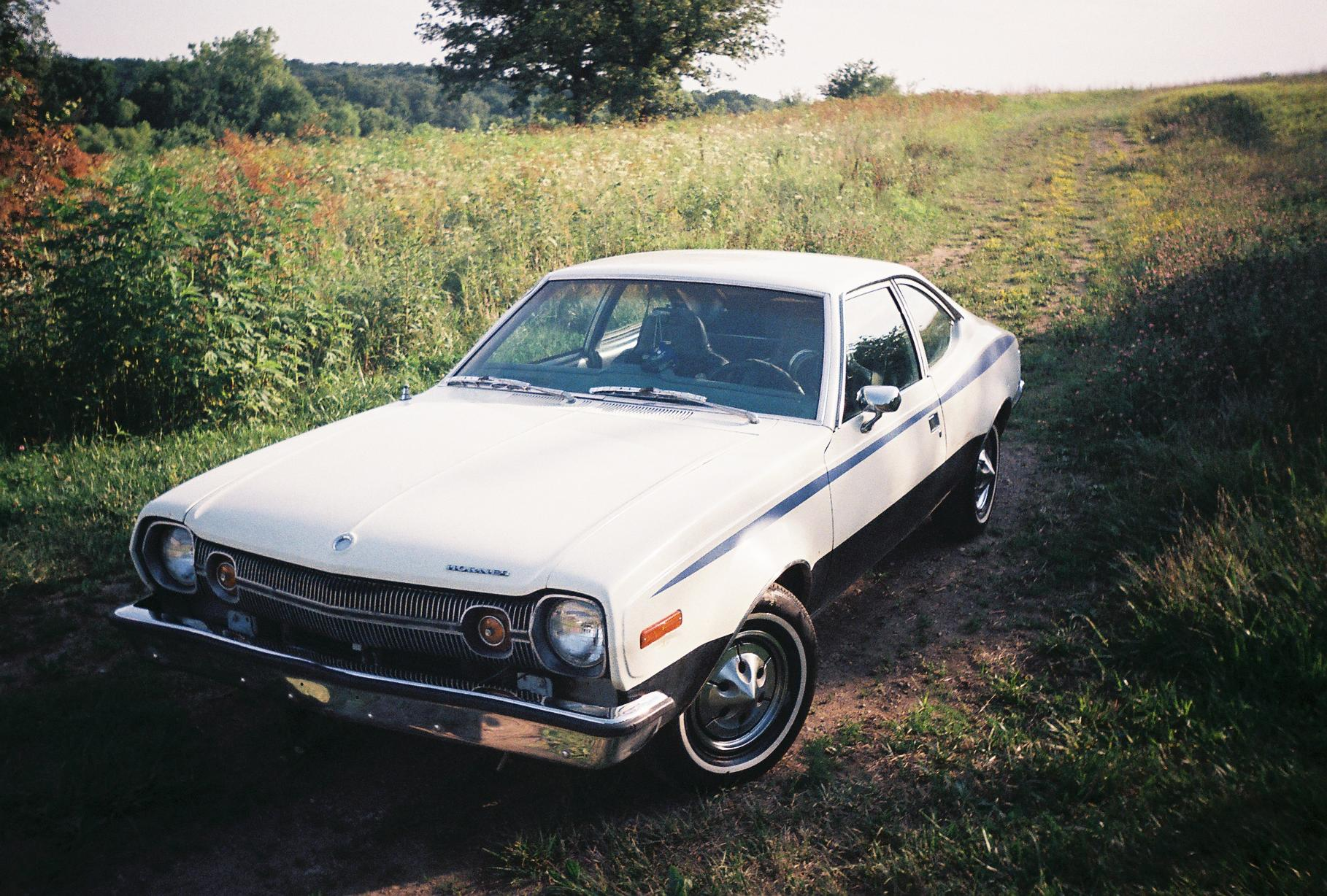
1973 AMC/American Motors Hornet 2-Door Fastback

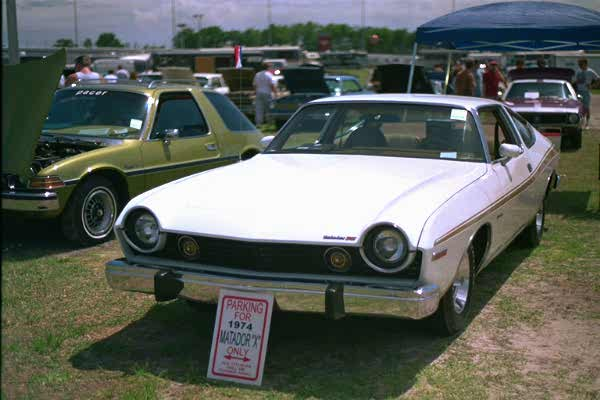
1974 Matador X Coupe

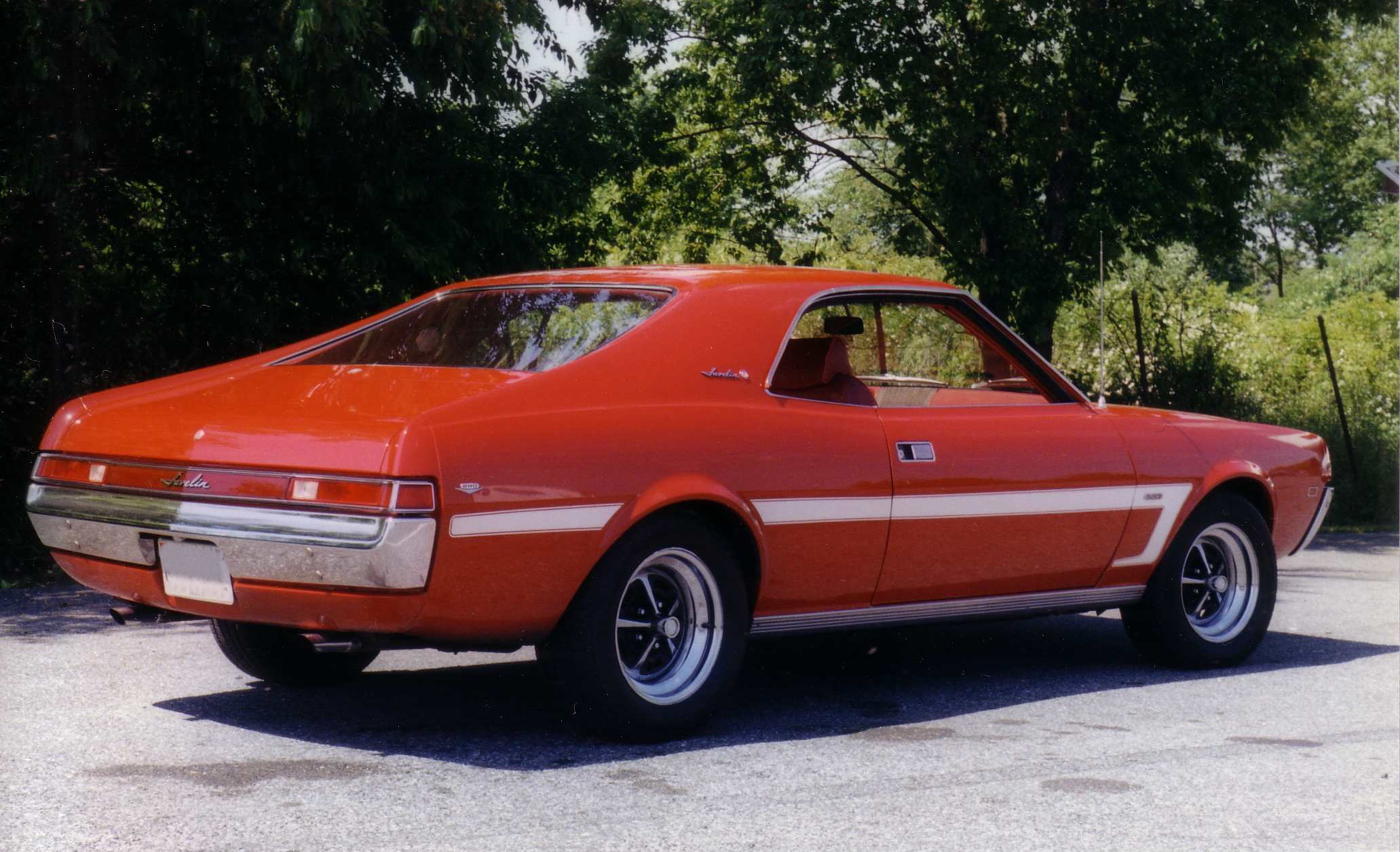
1969 AMC Javelin SST

British automotive writer Nick Georgano devotes a chapter to Teague in the book titled The Art of the American Automobile: the Greatest Stylists and Their Work, describing individuals whose creative talents made a difference in production and custom automobiles since the 1930s. According to the authors of the book, Yesterday's Tomorrows: Past Visions of the American Future, Teague was one of the people that "helped to transport us into the future." While serving as the chief stylist, Teague was called by Popular Mechanics to predict the design trends for automobiles in the 1960s. Together with Brooks Stevens, Teague presented ideas about future cars and vehicle technologies at the 1963 SAE congress in Detroit. Teague, "who is generally considered to have been a bit of a maverick" predicted an evolutionary process for automobiles that turned out to be correct. Teague foretold improvements in conventional gasoline engines, while cars "would have greater variety of style now that glass could be shaped, and better suspension systems". In contrast to Stevens, Teague believed that the automobiles of 1970 would still be built to provide basic transportation, not "a home on wheels", and be powered by an advanced power plant "the size of a breadbox."

During the early 1960s, Teague's styling team began developing an entirely new concept for AMC—a sporty fastback design. Teague knew that the automaker was just not willing to spend the millions of dollars needed for all-new tooling; his design team made imaginative use of existing tooling and devised spin-offs from existing products. The results were proposals for which Teague selected the names for both: the Tarpon show car and the production Marlin. Although promoting the smaller version, Teague recalled that "Abernethy had decided that instead of a 2+2 we would build a 3+3 sports-type car."

Teague was responsible for designing several AMC and Jeep vehicles. He developed the Gremlin, Pacer, Matador coupe, Rambler American, AMC Javelin, and AMX and Hornet. Subsequently, he adapted AMC's compact platform for the Concord, Spirit, and Eagle models. Teague was also responsible for many concept cars and lobbied for the production of several, including the compact Tarpon, which ultimately led to the development of the large Marlin. He also lobbied company executives to continue the two-seat AMX models after the 1970 model year.

The 1968 AMX GT was one of the Teague-designed concept cars with some design elements incorporated into production models. For this short-wheelbase coupe, he styled a truncated kammback tail, which was then used on the 1970 Gremlin. Teague also designed the "Concept 80" series of show cars, built on variations of existing AMC platforms as ideas for possible future models.

One of Teague's most significant designs was the 1970 AMX/3, which AMC developed with chassis engineering by Italian sports-car engineer Giotto Bizzarrini and road testing and development by BMW. Before Teague and his team settled on the final design, a fiberglass push-mobile was produced using molds taken from the final clay mockup. The AMX/3 was among the most unusual cars to come out of Detroit in the late 1960s, with internationally sourced components and a top speed of 160 mph (260 km/h); its closest competitor was arguably the Ford Pantera. Teague was instrumental in bringing the car toward production at a reasonable cost, but forthcoming U.S. bumper regulations and other issues would have inflated its price beyond the point of commercial viability.

Teague was responsible for the Jeep Cherokee (XJ) that was launched in the United States in 1983. He described the practical and utilitarian appearance of the new SUV: "We didn't want to lose the flavor of the older Jeeps ... We wanted it to look like something you'd want to take into the rough country." The design was unchanged and remained in production through 2001 and in China to 2005. The Cherokee XJ was described by one automotive magazine in 2009 as "possibly the best SUV shape of all time", and was the last Teague design to go into production. Automotive journalist Robert Cumberford, writing for Automobile, called the Jeep XJ one of the 20 greatest cars of all time—for its design, and "possibly the best SUV shape of all time, it is the paradigmatic model to which other designers have since aspired."

Starting in 1982, Teague worked on the first large cars sold by AMC since 1978, the front-drive sedan code-named X-58, for introduction in late 1986. and a companion code-named X-59, which was to debut for the 1988 model year. He achieved a roomy interior in an aerodynamic design. The two-door version was to have featured hidden headlamps, but the coupe was never produced. Giorgetto Giugiaro penned the sharper-edged exterior design for the four-door sedan that went into production as the Eagle Premier.

== Historian and collector ==
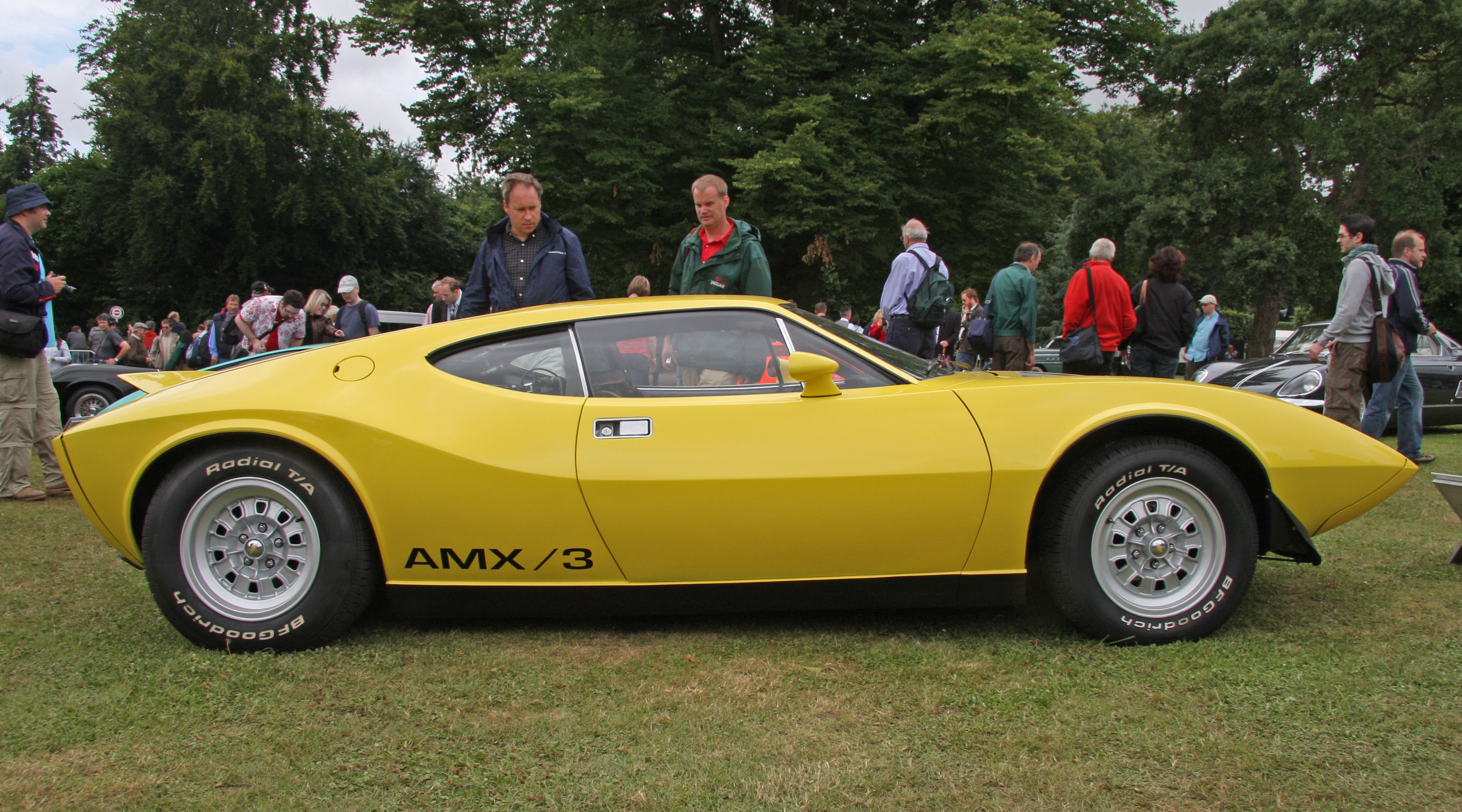
1970 AMX/3, a mid-engined car

Teague was a noted automobile historian who collected classic and rare vehicles, as well as other automotive memorabilia. He restored old cars as a hobby, including a 1904 Packard, one of the first produced, and had already owned 285 vehicles by 1970. Teague was a four-wheel-drive enthusiast even before AMC bought Jeep. He owned several World War II models. At retirement, he mentioned that he had owned "400 or 500" cars. Teague's collection included a rare AMX/3. It was donated to the San Diego Automotive Museum along with most of his papers.

== Awards ==
- Chilton's Automotive Industries magazine named Teague the 1976 "Man of the Year" for his designs and work on the AMC Pacer. In the award's 12-year history, this was the first time an automotive stylist was so honored.
- Teague was honored with the EyesOn Design 1999 "Lifetime Design Achievement Award" for his accomplishments as an automotive designer.
- Teague was inducted posthumously to the AMC Hall of Fame as the 2012 "Person of American Motors", an award established in 2002 on the "AMC Forum" recognizing an executive or employee of AMC or a subsidiary company that was instrumental to the company's success.

== Family ==
Teague married his wife Marian A. Rose (Johnson, 1927–2025) in 1950. He had three children: Richard B. ("Rick", 1953–2002), Jeff (1956–2016), and daughter Lisa (Scarpelli). Jeff Teague was also an industrial designer and established two automotive and product design services firms: "Teague Design" and "JTDNA Design". Jeff was quoted as saying that he did not "long for the vehicles of his father's days", but had sketched updated versions of his father's designs including the AMX/3.

== Death ==
Teague died on 5 May 1991 after suffering a long illness.

== Bibliography ==
- Kimes, Beverly (2005). Packard: A History of the Motor Car and the Company. Automobile Quarterly. ISBN 9780971146815.
- Lamm, Michael; Holls, Dave (1996). A Century of Automotive Style: 100 Years of American Car Design. Lamm-Morada. ISBN 9780932128072.
- Mitchell, Larry (2000). AMC Muscle Cars. Motorbooks. ISBN 9780760307618.
