= AMC Cavalier =

Concept car designed by American Motors Corporation

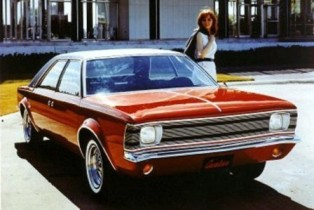

Overview
- Manufacturer: American Motors (AMC)
- Production: 1965 (Concept car)
- Designer: Dick Teague

Body and chassis
- Class: Compact car
- Body style: 4-door sedan
- Layout: FR layout

Powertrain
- Engine: 343 cu in (5.6 L) V8

Dimensions
- Wheelbase: 108 in (2,743 mm)
- Length: 175 in (4,445 mm)
- Width: 65.5 in (1,664 mm)

The AMC Cavalier was a compact concept presented by American Motors Corporation (AMC) in 1965, noted for symmetrical elements of its design and its interchangeable body parts.

== Origin ==
The AMC Cavalier was one of four prototypes that hinted at AMC's future production vehicles. In 1966, the Cavalier became part of "Project IV" touring the auto show circuit. This group of four show cars included the Vixen (a four-seat coupe with "flying buttress" rear roof pillars), the AMX prototype (a two-seat coupe that evolved into the real production car), and the AMX II (a notchback hardtop that was 8 inches (203 mm) longer than the AMX). At the time, none of the concept cars carried the historic Rambler nameplate, which the automaker started phasing out in 1966 in favor of AMC.

Of the four cars, only the four-door Cavalier sedan with four seats was designed by Dick Teague in AMC's advanced design studio. While the "Project IV" cars were shown to the public, the automaker prepared future production cars. Elements of the Cavalier's design were incorporated into the new 1970 model year AMC Hornet, which required tooling and final stampings by summer 1969.

== Innovations ==
The Cavalier was a study in symmetry. It was built to demonstrate the use of numerous interchangeable body panels. For example, the fenders on opposite corners were identical. Similarly, the doors were shared with opposite sides (an idea originated by Cord on its prototype 935 Saloon) since the rear doors were hinged in the back (suicide door). The hood and decklid were also interchangeable. The Nash Metropolitan, which was introduced in 1953 and sold by AMC until 1962, also had interchangeable inner panels, but their outer skins differed. In addition to reducing tooling costs by thirty percent, the design objective of the AMC Cavalier was also to demonstrate ways to reduce the production costs.

Another small independent automaker also sought to reduce manufacturing costs toward the end of its existence. Studebaker developed a concept car with a 113-inch (2,870 mm) wheelbase for potential launch in 1967–1969. The fiberglass construction of the "Familia" design study featured interchangeable hood and trunk, doors, bumpers, headlight, and taillight housings, windshield and back window, as well as side windows. However, the Familia's concepts were not incorporated into Studebaker production cars.

The Cavalier also featured curved sides, as if a fuselage, punctuated by full wheel arches and riding on 13-inch (330 mm) "mag" wheels with whitewall tires. The rear roof pillars ("C" pillar) were a "flying buttress" design providing the profile view of the car with a swept-back roof style to what appears to be a short rear deck. The rear window was recessed between the C pillars, making back area look similar to that of the General Motors' 1966–1967 "A" body platform two-door models, such as the Chevrolet Chevelle and Pontiac GTO. The swept-back panels and roof were covered in black vinyl to enhance the car's deep red metallic body finish.

The Cavalier featured a minimal amount of ornamentation compared to contemporary production cars, but was comparable to popular foreign makes as AMC was interested in marketing the car overseas. Utility was enhanced with dual-action scissor-type hinges on the deck lid so it could be opened like a normal trunk lid, or elevated to the height of the car's roof to accommodate tall, large, and bulky items in the trunk area.

Safety was emphasized with wrap-around rear lights designed to illuminate alternate warning signals in green, yellow, and red. A built-in roll bar reinforcement allowed for the thin pillar posts and roof panel. Exterior door handles were replaced with flush, push-type door buttons.

The dashboard of the Cavalier was a schematic layout of the car; the vehicle's profile and interior cavities were represented in the design of the dashboard.

Under the innovative body panel structure, the concept vehicle had a conventional front-mounted 343 cu in (5.6 L) 280 bhp (209 kW) AMC V8 engine with rear-wheel drive (FR layout). The compact-sized AMC Cavalier rode on a 108-inch (2,743 mm) wheelbase and offered seating capacity for six adults.

== Project Europa ==
American Motors was working to expand sales and operations overseas. In 1967, Dick Teague, proposed "Project Europa," an initiative to adapt the Cavalier concept into a compact, front-wheel-drive "world car" for international markets. Intended to address European tax structures and road conditions that rendered conventional U.S. models like the Rambler Classic and Rebel, which Renault assembled from Knock-down kits in Belgium, that were large and costly E segment executive cars.

The project utilized the compact-sized Cavalier's component interchangeability — including diagonal door swapping and shared body stampings — to reduce tooling costs by an estimated 35%. The car idea incorporated front-wheel drive to eliminate the center tunnel, making the "Europa" a six-passenger vehicle. The proposal also called for locally sourced 75–120 cu in (1.2–2.0 L) four-cylinder powertrains supplied by Renault, Lancia, or Triumph. Teague's proposal envisioned assembly by European contract manufacturers, such as Vignale and Farina. Moreover, Officine Stampaggi Industriali (OSI) provided an unofficial quote of $3.5 million for tooling, fixtures, and other costs. They could produce 25,000 to 100,000 units annually. The cars could also be imported to the United States for additional sales. Although evaluated by AMC management as a low-cost method to expand overseas manufacturing and to have a small car to meet the gas crises of the 1970s, the "Project Europa" was not pursued.

== Legacy ==
According to Robert B. Evans, chairman of the automaker at the time, the Cavalier toured the auto show circuit to "help restore public confidence in AMC, where sales have sagged."

"The styling of this car totally works when contrasted with the other similarly sized offerings" during the mid-1960s that included the Chevrolet Corvair and the Ford Falcon.

Except for the short hood giving it equal-length front and rear decks, many of the Cavalier's styling touches found their way into the AMC Hornet that was introduced for the 1970 model year. The Hornet was also designed under the direction of Richard A. Teague. "The Cavalier's strong horizontal lines, flat surfaces, minimal overhangs, and blockish face were all visual hints to the 1970 AMC Hornet compact." Although the production Hornets did not use interchangeable body parts, its front and rear bumpers were made from the same stamping.

A coupe version of the Cavalier was also part of the "Project IV" concept tour, but was designed without parts swapping. This companion model, called the "Vixen," also forecast the 1970 Hornet appearance "in its simple, blunt "face," dual headlamps, long-hood/short-deck profile, and flared wheel openings."

Teague took the exact opposite of the Cavalier's symmetrical design for the 1973 "Hornet GT" concept car. This car featured differently styled sides and pillars to test ways of improving both visibility and roof strength, as well as gaining more interior space.

== Postage stamp ==
The Sharjah Post Office issued a 3 dirham (Dh) airmail stamp in January 1971 depicting a drawing of the AMC Cavalier (Michel catalog stamp number 783). It is part of a "Post Day" series of stamps illustrating a pair of early and modern automobiles. The postage stamp shows a 1904 Rambler and the Cavalier, which is misidentified on the stamp as a 1970 car. This could be because the concept vehicle looked so similar to the AMC Hornet that was introduced for the 1970 model year.

== Name ==
American Motors planned to use the "Cavalier" name for a new pony car model to debut in 1968. By that time, however, General Motors had secured the rights to the "Cavalier" name, which it would use fourteen years later on the Chevrolet Cavalier. The second choice was selected: Javelin.
