= Norbert Ostrowski =

American automotive designer

- Born: Norbert Conrad Ostrowski; May 19, 1938; Detroit, Michigan, United States
- Died: December 9, 2018 (aged 80); Royal Oak, Michigan
- Education: ArtCenter College of Design
- Occupation: Automotive designer
- Years active: 1955–1985
- Employers: General Motors; Chrysler Corporation; American Motors Corporation

Norbert Ostrowski (19 May 1938 – 9 December 2018) was an American artist, designer, and clay modeler over his three-decade career in the automobile industry. He contributed to the styling departments of American Motors Corporation, Chrysler, and General Motors. Beyond his automotive work, Ostrowski was a painter and sculptor.

== Biography ==
Ostrowski was born in Detroit and was the eldest of seven children. His parents, Conrad and Genevieve, encouraged his artistic talents. A passion for cars led him to compete in Soap Box Derby racing, and on the advice of a family friend, he pursued a career in automotive design.

In 1958, Ostrowski won a styling design contest sponsored by the General Motors Fisher Body Craftsman's Guild. He earned a scholarship to the Art Center College of Design in California and graduated in 1961.

Ostrowski is buried at the Holy Sepulchre Cemetery.

== Career ==
"Ostrowski began designing cars during the golden age of the American automobile". He began at General Motors, followed by three years with Chrysler's styling department.

In 1965, he joined American Motors Corporation (AMC), where he worked under Dick Teague on production designs. He was in the advanced styling studio with "Chuck" Mashigan. Over the next two decades, he contributed to the team developing designs of show cars including the Project IV concepts, as well as production models such as the 1968 Javelin and AMX, as well as the 1970 Gremlin.

Ostrowski's sketches included a "very distinct method of shading in a quick crosshatch manner". His influence was seen on the 1975 AMC Pacer. However, the early-stage artwork created by designers was routinely destroyed to protect trade secrets and not to be seen by other automakers. Some have been preserved because they were smuggled out of the studios, and after many decades, put on display. Ostrowski's design sketches has also been published in automotive books.

His artistic talents extended beyond automobile projects. In 1965, Ostrowski sold his first painting at an art show at Hudson's. His sculptures and paintings were exhibited at Detroit's Scarab Club. They are held by collectors and museums, with some works being commissioned.
