= EyesOn Design =

Car design event in Michigan

EyesOn Design are a series of events including an annual car show and a fundraiser for the Detroit Institute of Ophthalmology in Michigan, United States. It has become a national event focused on the emotion and character of automotive design.

== History ==
The EyesOn Design Show was established in late 1986 as both a celebration of automotive design and a fundraiser for the Detroit Institute of Ophthalmology, a nonprofit organization in Grosse Pointe Park, Michigan, devoted to matters pertaining to the eye and vision.

The first shows were called "Eyes On The Classics" and were held in the Grosse Pointe Academy parking lots. Initially focused on the domestic "Big Three" (General Motors, Ford and Chrysler), the show was expanded to include automakers from around the world. The name was also changed to "EyesOn Design". For its third show, the venue moved to the grounds of the Edsel and Eleanor Ford House.

To ease access and accommodate the increasing public attendance, the design chiefs at DaimlerChrysler, Ford, and General Motors suggested that the event be hosted by one of their companies each year. The 2002 show was held at the Chrysler Headquarters and Technology Center in Auburn Hills, Michigan. The theme for this 15th anniversary weekend-long show was "Performance Vehicles".

In 2003, the General Motors Technical Center in Warren, Michigan hosted the event. According to General Motors, the 2003 event was the largest and most complete collection of concept vehicles ever assembled, representing GM, Ford, Chrysler, and other automakers. The three-day event was also the first time the GM Design Center was open to the general public. Attendees also had the opportunity to purchase rides in notable GM concept cars.

Chuck Jordan, a founding chairman of the annual EyesOn Design event, was commemorated during the January 2011 North American International Auto Show in Detroit. The EyesOn Design show celebrated its 25th anniversary in the summer of 2012 on the grounds of the Edsel and Eleanor Ford House, with over 200 vehicles displayed by invitation only.

== Design focus ==
The "Eyes on Design Show" has grown from an East Side show to an automobile exhibition of national and international significance.

According to the Ford Motor Company, the Eyes on Design Show is the world's only car show to focus on the emotion and character of automotive design.

The show brings together some 250 concept cars in one place, with the assistance of automotive design executives. In addition to vehicles from various automakers, the event also features concept cars by invitation from vintage automobile collectors and restorers.

The vehicles shown at the annual event are by invitation. Judging in numerous classes is "based not on the quality of the restoration or authenticity"; rather, it is based on "the design character, emotional appeal and artistic excellence of the vehicle."

== Lifetime Design Achievement ==
The EyesOn Design celebrations include the "Lifetime Design Achievement" award. This recognition is given to an accomplished automotive designer selected by previous winners of this award.

- 2022 – Pete Brock,
- 2021 – Deferred due to COVID
- 2020 – Deferred due to Covid
- 2019 – Leonardo Fioravanti
- 2018 – Edward T. Welburn
- 2017 – Syd Mead
- 2016 – Stewart Reed
- 2015 – Patrick Le Quément
- 2014 – Peter Schreyer
- 2013 – Wayne Cherry
- 2012 – Chris Bangle
- 2011 – Walter de'Silva
- 2010 – Shiro Nakamura
- 2009 – Willie G. Davidson
- 2008 – Robert A. Lutz
- 2007 – Marcello Gandini
- 2006 – Jack Telnack
- 2005 – Chuck Jordan
- 2004 – Charles Pelly
- 2002 – Tom Gale
- 2001 – Giorgetto Giugiaro
- 2000 – Design Visionaries of the 20th Century
- 1999 – Dick Teague
- 1998 – George W. Walker
- 1997 – Bruno Sacco
- 1996 – General Motors Styling Staff, 1937–1972
- 1995 – The Raymond Loewy Studebaker Design Team and the Porsche family
- 1994 – Homer LeGassey and Nuccio Bertone
- 1993 – LeBaron Carrossiers
- 1992 – William Lyons
- 1991 – Harley Earl and Sergio Pininfarina
- 1990 – Virgil Exner and Eugene T. "Bob" Gregorie
- 1989 – Strother MacMinn and Bill Mitchell
- 1988 – Gordon Buehrig
