= Packard Executive =

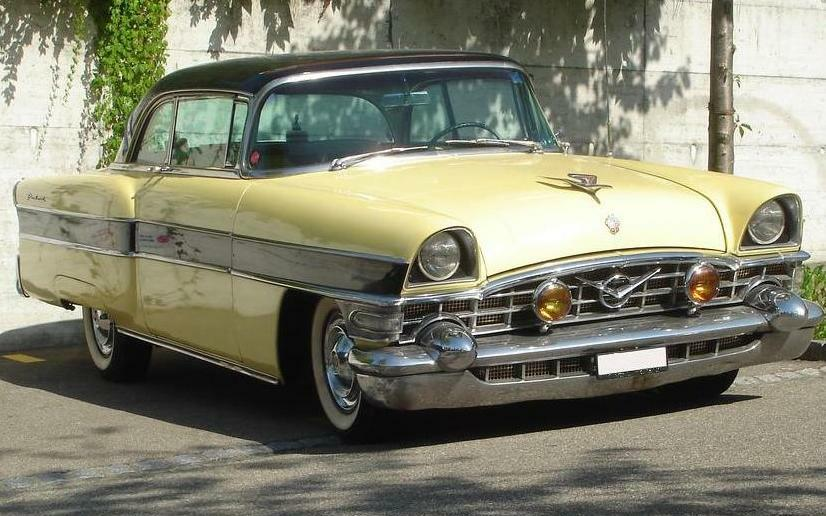
- 1956 Packard Executive

Overview
- Manufacturer: Packard
- Production: 1956
- Designer: Dick Teague

Body and chassis
- Body style: Sedan
- Layout: FR
- Related: Packard Patrician; Packard Caribbean

Powertrain
- Engine: Packard V-8; 352 cu in (5.77 L)
- Transmission: Twin-Ultramatic

Dimensions
- Wheelbase: 122 in (3,099 mm)
- Length: 214.8 in (5,456 mm)
- Width: 78 in (1,981 mm)
- Height: 62.8 in (1,595 mm)
- Curb weight: 4,185 lb (1,898 kg)

Chronology
- Predecessor: Packard Cavalier

The Packard Executive was an automobile produced by the Packard-Clipper Division of the Studebaker-Packard Corporation in 1956. It was built to fill a perceived price gap between other Packard models.

The cars extremely short production year was caused by the closure of the Detroit factory, where it was built, in June 1956.

== Introduction ==
The Packard Executive was introduced on March 5, 1956, to fill a perceived price gap between the prestige Packard Patrician line and the new Clipper marque, which was in its first year as a separate marque. In previous years, Clipper models had been Packards. The most expensive Clipper, the Clipper Custom, listed at $3,065 for the 4-door sedan. The Packard Executive sedan retailed for $3,465, the Executive 2-door coupe $3,560, while the top-of-the-line Patrician sedan sold for $4,160.

The Executive was marketed with the invitation to “enter the luxury car class now—at a modest investment,” and was aimed at "the young man on the way up."

== Description ==
The Executive was created by combining the Clipper Custom's body, complete with its distinctive tail light design, and installing the front fenders, hood, and radiator grille assembly of the senior Packard models. It also used the Clipper Custom's 122-inch (3,100 mm) wheelbase and its 352 cu in (5.8 L) 275 hp (205 kW) all new, Packard designed overhead valve V8 engine. This contrasted with the engine used by the top level 1956 Packard Patrician, which displaced 374 cu in (6.1 L) and developed 295 hp (220 kW) (310 hp (230 kW) for the Caribbean).

Beyond the senior Packard grille and front end sheet metal, Executives were further distinguished from the Clipper line by a unique side trim design that made reference to the senior Packards, and allowed for two-toned paint schemes. However, the interior appointments and instrumentation were pure Clipper. The prototypes produced for the all-new 1957 Packard and Clipper lines show an all-new Executive that would become a baseline Packard.

Executives received their own series designation of 5670. It was offered in two body styles; a two-door hardtop (model 5677), and a four-door Touring Sedan (model 5672).

== Sales ==
Although the Executive sold as fast as it was produced it was not enough to substantially improve the financial picture for the Packard-Clipper Division. Even as the Executive was being announced, the media had already been reporting of sales and fiscal woes at the Studebaker-Packard Corporation, and rumors were flying the Packard marque might be discontinued. These rumors weighed heavily on the company's efforts to sell any of its products. Buyers did not wish to be stuck with a so-called “orphan” car, where spare parts would no longer be available from a dealer, and resale values would be negatively impacted.

During the Executive's shortened model year of March through June, Packard built a total of 2,779 Executives—1,031 two-door hardtops and 1,748 four-door sedans.

All Detroit production of Packard and Clipper models ceased 25 June 1956 with the shuttering of the Conner Avenue assembly plant. The Packard name was continued for the 1957 and 1958 model years on products based on Studebaker platforms, built on the same assembly lines in South Bend, Indiana as the Studebaker models.
