= Packard Panther =

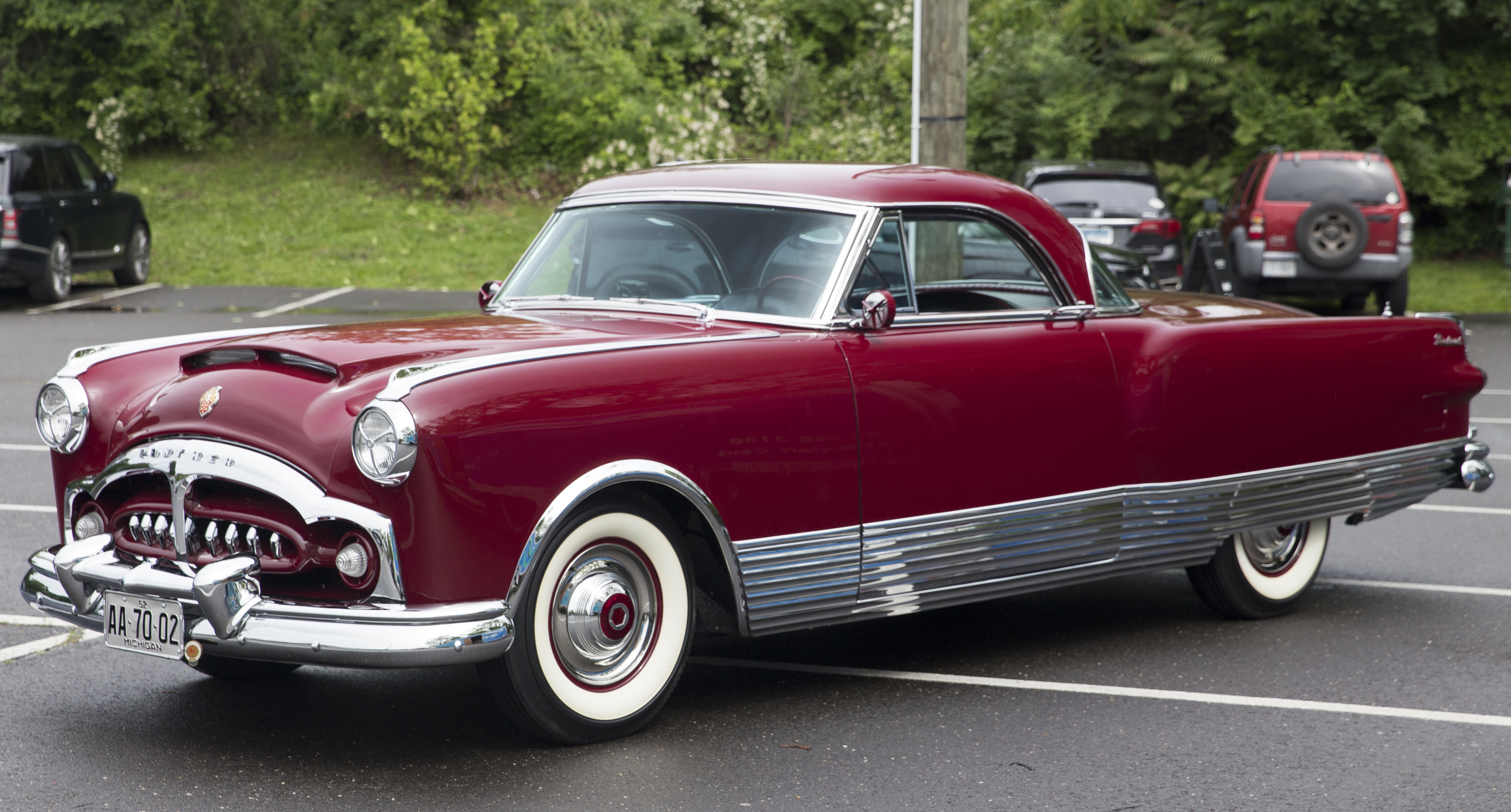
Packard Panther

The Packard Panther is a concept car built in 1954 by Packard and was displayed at auto shows to showcase some of the ideas the automaker was considering for its production models. This show car was first named the "Grey Wolf" and also called the "Packard Daytona". A total of four Panthers were built.

== Design ==
The Panther is a two-seat "personal luxury" sporting convertible (in the same vein as the Pan-American), with Packard styling cues, but lower stance. Originally, the cars had 1955 Clipper taillights, but these were subsequently removed and replaced with the Senior Series' "cathedral" style units. The design for the Panther's one-piece fiberglass body is credited to Dick Teague. He designed several Packard cars and worked at Mitchell-Bentley Corporation at the time. Teague later joined American Motors Corporation (AMC).

Although it was shown in late 1954 and 1955 (when Packard was already advertising its new, modern overhead valve V8), the Panther featured the company's previous 327 cu in (5.4 L) L-head (flathead) straight-eight, supercharged to produce 275 hp (205 kW), along with Ultramatic automatic transmission.

Of the four Panthers built, one was owned by Mitchell-Bentley exec William Mitchell, Sr. The Mitchell car is the only Panther that had a removable hardtop (which resembled that of the 1955 Thunderbird).

== See also ==
- Pan-American concept car
