= Packard Clipper =

Packard Clipper Clipper (1956 only)
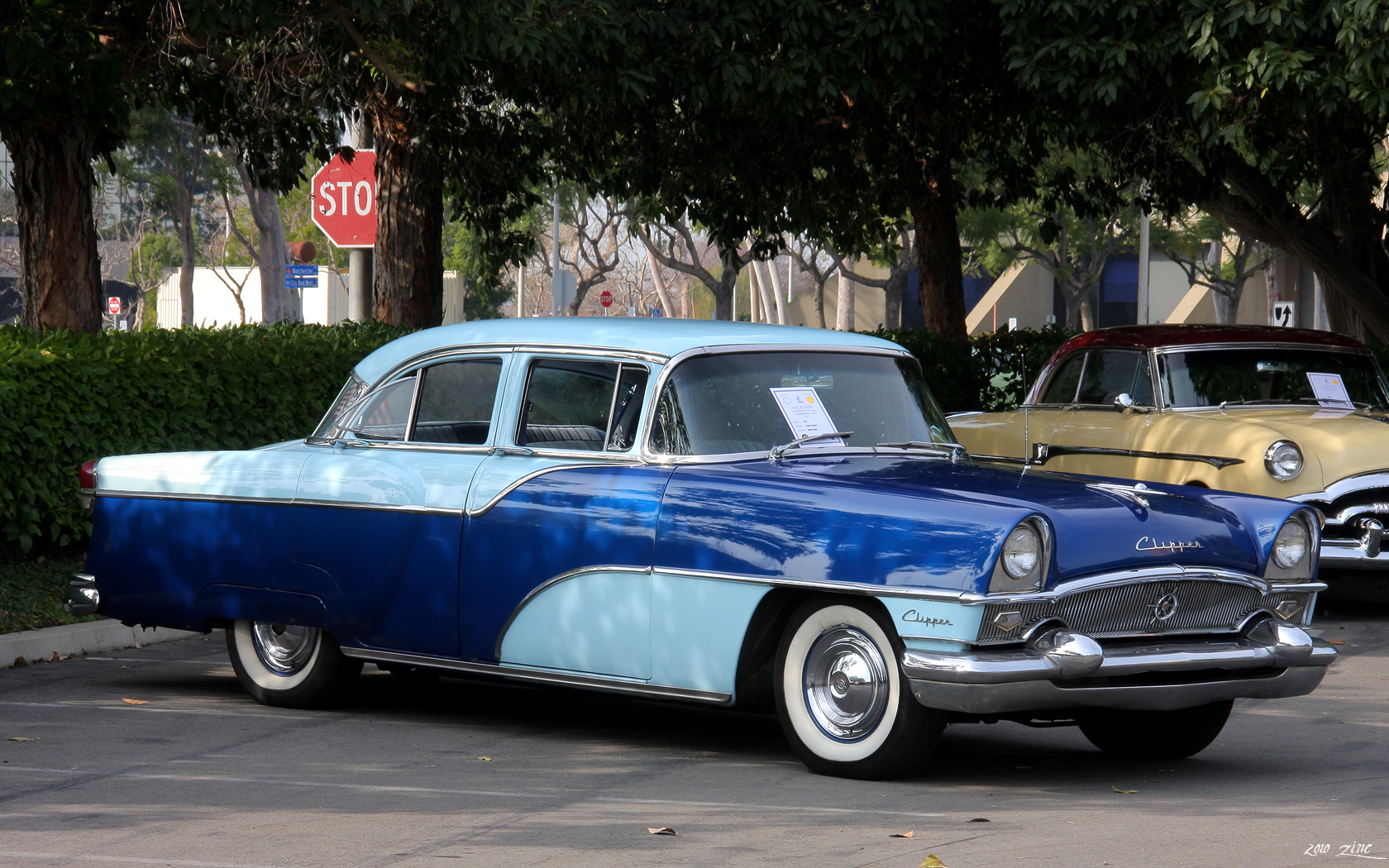
- 1955 Packard Clipper Custom 4-door Sedan

Overview
- Production: 1941–1942; 1946–1947; 1953–1955; 1956 (Clipper marque); 1957
- Assembly: United States; Australia

Body and chassis
- Related: Packard Executive; Packard Panther

Chronology
- Predecessor: Packard 200

The Packard Clipper is an automobile series built by the Packard Motor Car Company (and by the later Studebaker-Packard Corporation) for model years 1941–1942, 1946–1947, and 1953–1957. It was named for a type of sailing ship, called a clipper.

The Clipper was introduced in April 1941, as a mid-model year entry. It was available only as a four-door sedan. The extreme top-rung high hat models had had their day, with engineering improvements, less expensive, more rationally sized fare predominating. Since the action was in the increasingly sophisticated, upper-medium price field, the debut Clipper line was aimed at Buick Roadmaster, Cadillac's cutthroat-priced Model 62, Chrysler Saratoga/New Yorker, and Lincoln (through 1940 known as Zephyr). The Clipper name was re-introduced in 1953, for the automaker's lowest-priced lineup, leading some to think it was a cheap car initially, instead of a full-range offering. By 1955, the Clipper models were seen as diluting Packard's marketing as a luxury automobile marque.

The Clipper was classified as a stand-alone marque for the 1956 model year when it was produced by the Studebaker-Packard Corporation. Following the closure of Packard's Detroit, Michigan factory in 1956, the Clipper marque was discontinued, although the Clipper name was applied to 1957 Packards that were built at Studebaker's South Bend, Indiana, factory.

== 1941–1947 ==
By the end of the 1930s, Packard president Max M. Gilman realized that efforts to improve the company's profitability during the previous decade. The Packard One-Twenty model was introduced in 1935 and its success in the marketplace helped save the company. The One-Ten had followed, achieving even higher volume. Despite a strong performance during 1937, Packard sales plummeted during the recession in 1938. The automaker's 76,000 sales for the calendar year 1939 were barely at its break-even point. Packard achieved a profit of only half-million dollars. This precarious financial state, combined with new model developments among Packard's rivals (GM's LaSalle and Cadillac Series 61, Chrysler Imperial, and the Lincoln-Zephyr), meant Gilman quickly needed something radically new to keep the company going.

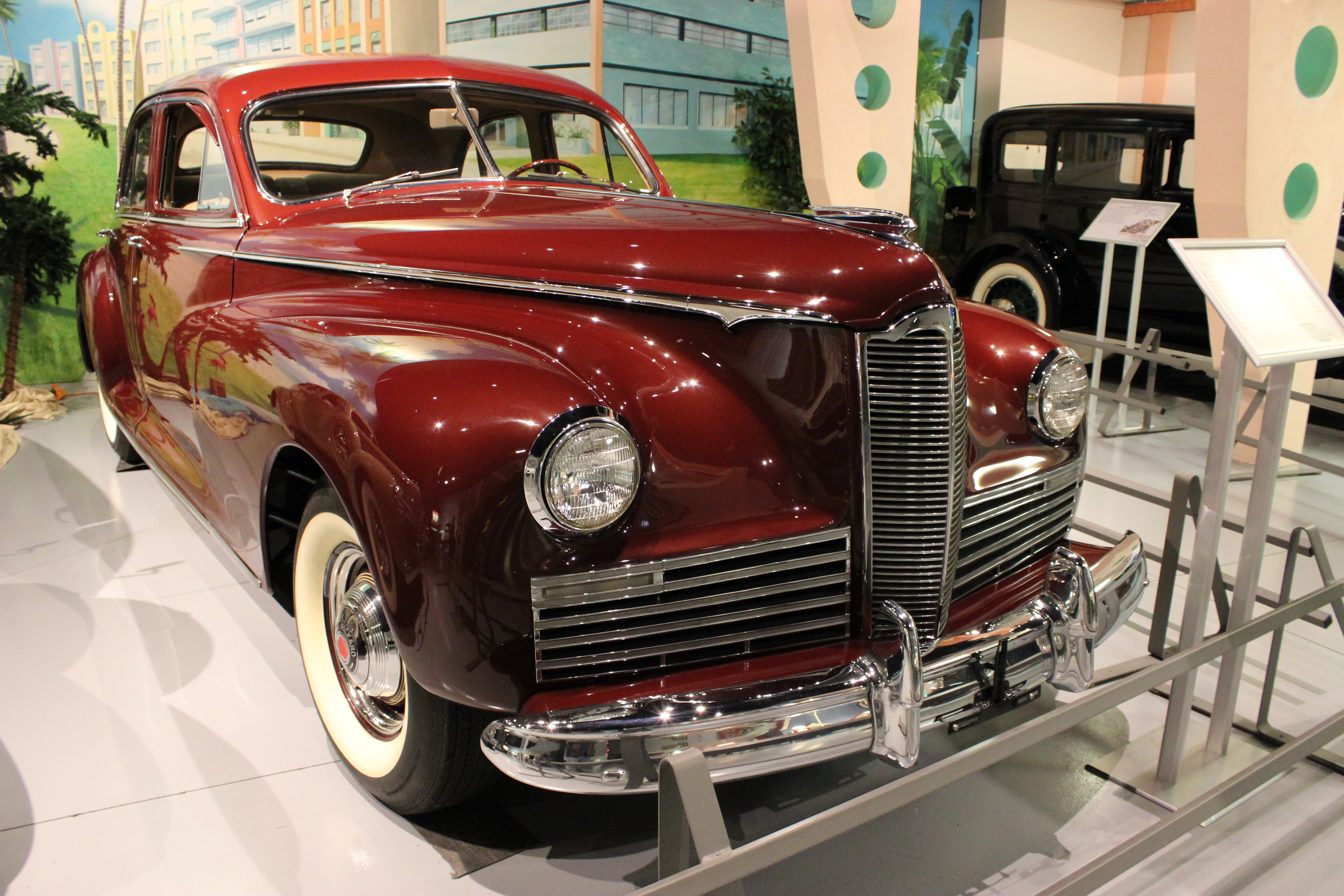
1941 the first Clipper

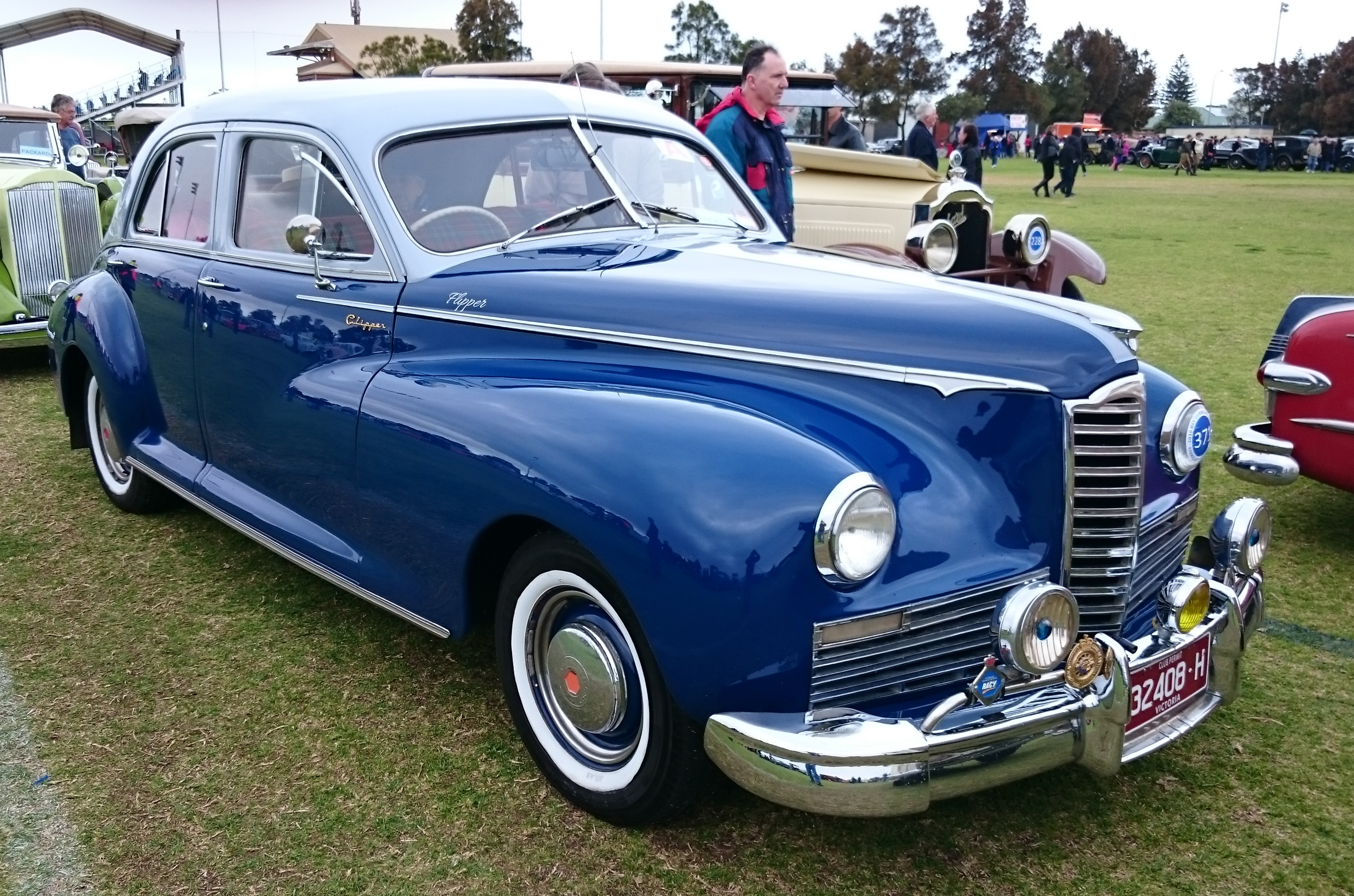
1946 Packard Clipper Six Touring Sedan

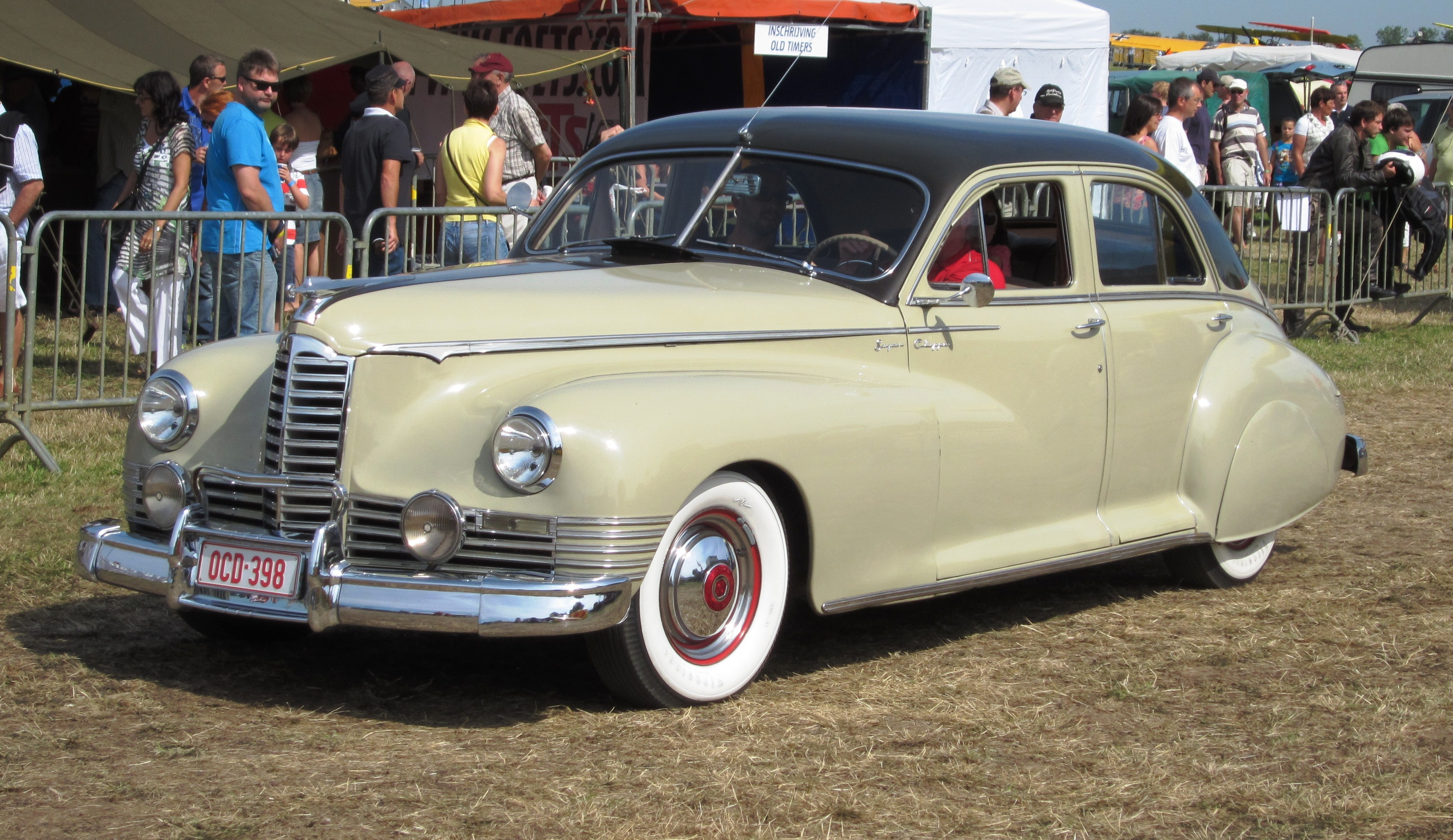
1947 Packard Super Clipper Touring Sedan

The company developed a new car that was introduced eight months before the attack on Pearl Harbor. Packard's hopes for the future rode on the new Packard Clipper line that represented a break from traditional styling and embodied an abrupt change in construction techniques. However, World War II intervened. It made Packard's investment to produce one of the only all-new 1941 American cars impossible to realize in the altered conditions.

=== Initial reception ===
The Clipper's market timing could not have been worse. After only 16,600 of the 1941 models were made, and a few thousand 1942s, Detroit stopped building civilian automobiles to concentrate on defense production. By the time cars began rolling off the lines again in late 1945, the still sleek Clipper's impact had been diminished by four years of war. The bright promise of its debut was limited by late introduction; what should have been its solid sophomore year was weakened by World War II. Its third and fourth years were postponed until 1946–47. Though Packard designer John Reinhart and other Company insiders wanted to retain and "sweeten" (in Reinhart's words) the Clipper's svelte lines, Packard management felt pressured by new, industry-wide postwar designs, thus introducing the mixed review "bathtub" or "pregnant elephant" 1948–1950 Packards.

There were only two other automakers introducing all-new 1941 models which were stopped short by the American entry into World War II and thus rendered obsolete before their time. Besides Packard, Ford brought out a much-changed design for the 1941 model year — the restyled Ford and its Mercury clone. Nash also produced all-new 1941 models, using monocoque "unitized" construction for the first time. General Motors redesigned for 1942, arguably a piece of bad timing even worse than Packard's, but the 1942 cars were so relatively few in number that they still looked reasonably new when GM resumed automotive production in 1946. The Ford/Mercury comparison was not apt either, primarily because these were quite different cars from Packards, with no pretense of luxury. Nor did their design history mirror the Clipper's. The 1941 Fords and Mercurys were evolutionary developments, clearly related to the 1940s they replaced. The Clipper was such a dramatic break with the previous Packard design as to preclude comparisons.

After the war, while Packard opted to improve the Clipper, while other automakers restyled its models for 1949. While the bulbous 1941–48 Fords, Mercuries, and Nashes were replaced by modern designs, the Clipper was undone by a bulbous 1948 upgrade that, while well received in its initial year, aged quickly in comparison with the new models from the "Big Three" and Nash, and cost as much to reskin as a wholly new car would've cost. A 1949 Mercury Eight which had cost $2,000 new was still worth $430 five years later, while a 1949 Packard Eight which had cost $2,200 new was worth only $375. Motor Trend automotive journalist Tom McCahill, who had raved about the '46 Packard Clipper Deluxe eight, called the 1948 Packard "a dowager in a Queen Elizabeth hat," and "a goat.'

The Clipper's timing was unfortunate. The state of the world being beyond Packard's control, Clipper production came to a halt on February 9, 1942, just as it was hitting its stride and when Clipper styling had spread through the entire Packard model lineup.

=== Style identity ===
A full envelope body with a modern look was a long time coming at Packard. Cadillac was wearing pontoon fenders and flowing lines by 1934 and had adopted all-steel bodies by 1935. In 1936, Lincoln announced the Zephyr, with an all-steel unibody, and a shape so advanced that derivations of it were still in production twelve years later. Chrysler also tried introducing a streamlined platform which the market didn't respond well to, named the Chrysler Airflow. By comparison, Packard adhered to traditional, crisp, conservative styling. Its main acknowledgment of new-era styling was the skirted fender which appeared in 1933. Packard – like Lincoln and Cadillac – had survived the Depression by building medium-priced cars: the One Twenty, Zephyr, and LaSalle, respectively. But unlike its rivals, Packard styling had remained arch-traditional. Unlike Lincoln, Packard followed the medium-priced One-Twenty with an almost-low-priced car, the Six (later briefly known as the One Ten). Unlike Cadillac, Packard refused to market its cheaper models by a different name and remained wedded to them long after prosperity had returned. By 1941, the year the Clipper debuted, the least expensive Cadillac was priced at $1,445; the lowest priced Packard sold for only $927.

Arguably its conservative design philosophy had stood Packard well in the years leading up to the Clipper. The company was able to advertise—and sold quite a few Packards with—styling continuity from year to year. There was a family resemblance between a 1939 and a 1932. In 1939, the comparison of its One Twenty with the LaSalle, the company declared that: "Packard has style identity...Packard styling is consistent...But look at the 1938 LaSalle! About the only similarity is in the name, and who can be sure that a sudden fanciful style change won't make the 1939 a style orphan?"

Mercedes-Benz and Rolls-Royce survived for years with very expensive but dated designs. Packard also survived with limited styling change for at least eight or nine years up through 1940. Packard's hallmarks were good ones: the chiseled frontispiece; the grille recalling classic Greek architecture; the ox-yoke radiator/hood shape harkened back to the Model L of 1904. The cormorant mascot, red hexagon hubs, and arrowhead side-spear, were recognizable and timeless.

To create a modern envelope body while retaining those famous hallmarks was no small undertaking. It was still one of the chief accomplishments of automotive industrial design that the people who created the Packard Clipper were able to do so flawlessly. Advertising invited America to "Skipper the Clipper" in 1941. It was showing the country an obviously brand-new, up to date, in Packard's words, "Windstream" or "Speed-Stream" automobile, yet one which was still undeniably a Packard. Though it did not owe a curve or contour to any previous model, the milestone 1941 Clipper carried the same inimitable radiator and hood shape, as well as the same arrowheads and red hexes, and the same long hood and close-coupled profile of Packards of the past.

=== Design ===
Writing in The Classic Car and The Packard Cormorant, Joel Prescott published an account of the Clipper design which considerably revised the picture offered by George Hamlin and Dwight Heinmuller in Packard: A History of the Motor Car and The Company, published by Automotive Quarterly. James A. Ward's book on the decline of the Packard Motor Car Company includes views of designers such as Howard Darrin, John Reinhart, William Reithard, and Alex Tremulis.

Prior to World War II, Packard, like most auto companies at the time, did not have a styling department. It was Harley Earl's formidable Art and Colour Section at General Motors that convinced the industry of the importance of styling. A handful of outside consultants, like Raymond Loewy at Studebaker, occasionally sold their designs to American producers. Sometimes the designs even reached production without drastic changes by the body engineers, who at that point largely controlled the shape of cars. One such design consultant was Howard "Dutch" Darrin, whose involvement in the Clipper occurred because Packard was his favorite American make.

After returning to America in 1937 following a successful career as a Paris coachbuilder, Darrin looked around for chassis on which to practice his automotive art. He said, "I concentrated on Packards knowing that by lowering the radiator I could make a very beautiful custom-bodied Packard with little change in its basic structure." The result was a long skein of dramatic Packard-Darrins, which were actually cataloged by the company at one point and which led to Darrin's role in the Clipper. "Around 1940, Packard called and asked if I'd design a new standard line car for them. The hitch was that I had only ten days to do so, Chief stylist Ed Macauley (actually vice-president for design) would be on the coast for that amount of time, and if I didn't have anything before he left, it would be a lost cause. The company offered me a thousand dollars a day if I could meet the deadline."

Confident in his ability to put a thousand a day to good use, Darrin said he thought he "could establish enough lines for a full- and quarter-scale model". Later he said that to meet the deadline, he "slept several nights on a drafting table", yet Packard never paid him.

Kaiser-Frazer stylist Bob Robillard admitted that Darrin had held onto his claim as the originator of the Clipper almost from the start. A 1946, Darrin paper delivered before the Society of Automotive Engineers, "Does Styling Control the Design of Cars?" stating that he widened the Clipper body because the continuous fender-line, which comes right through the door past the A-pillar, required more width for the proper hinging of the door, "the net result being a wider and more roomy car." However, according to Reithard, "the parameters for track, wheelbase and overall length had been established. Other than that, we had very little to go on except some very rough sketches and hand-waving from Darrin."

While Darrin held himself the central design figure and the original design "called for a sweeping front fender-line that carried right through the doors to the rise of the rear fender, similar to a custom Clipper I built later for Errol Flynn". However, Packard shortened the sweep to fade away at mid-door. This was done as a hedge because no one knew if the through-fender-line would sell. He said Packard Styling also "vandalized the design by throwing on huge gobs of clay along the wheelbase" creating a flare to the lower part of the doors to hide the running boards they added for the same reason. Thus, by Darrin's own admission, the Clipper that appeared in production was not entirely his work. Few designers besides Darrin believed this splendid car was the product of ten days' work. But despite the work of Packard's designers, the Clipper's theme was clearly Darrin's, confirmed by Alex Tremulis and other insiders.

At the time Packard contacted Darrin about designing a production car in the theme of his limited-production Victorias, the company was, according to Darrin, "....so afraid of GM they couldn't see straight." GM's new C bodies, introduced midway through the 1940 model year, made Packard's traditional bodies, only facelifted since their 1938 introduction, look dated. Packard had, as Darrin said, "....the best chassis in the industry," but upper-echelon GMobiles looked more modern than Packard's traditional 1941 bodies. 1941 Buick and Cadillac sales were up 24% while Packard's traditional bodied cars down an accordant amount.

The Clipper changed that. The only thing hindering the Clipper's ascendency was War II, and after the war, the sheet steel shortages and strikes at vendors plagued all independents. After the war, for example, Chrysler was held up for weeks just by a strike at the supplier of their door locks. Being a holding company, GM was better able to weather this situation.

Perhaps the best summation of the Clipper's design comes from Joel Prescott: "The truth may well be that the Clipper should be remembered as automotive history's most successful committee design, because assigning the genius of its beautiful lines exclusively to one particular designer cannot now be done with any degree of certainty." And as it turned out, this new look guaranteed the Clipper an appearance never compromised by competitive imitators. In 1942 Cadillac and Buick adopted the same pontoon fender line, but the Clipper still looked unique, apart from and slightly above the crowd, especially the new 1942 senior Clippers, which alone retained the debut 1941's 127-inch (3,200 mm) wheelbase, longer hood, and front fenders.

The Clipper was to be Packard's last bellringer not just for the Forties, but through the firm's 1956 demise, another reason its name brought back in 1953. Though introduced in April 1941, the Clipper, despite priced between the One-Twenty and One-Sixty, outsold the entire year's One-Twenty production.

=== Engineering and evolution ===
When considering the great transitional designs that brought us from the art decorations and speed-lining age of the Thirties into the envelope bodies of the Forties, much is always made of Bill Mitchell's famous Cadillac Sixty Special. In particular, its thin window frames, squared-off roof, wider-than-high grille, and concealed running boards were bold steps forward. The Clipper had at least as many pioneering features in an even more integrated package.

The original milestone 1941 Clipper rode the 120/160/180 wheelbase of 127 inches (3,200 mm) and used the One Twenty's 282-cubic-inch (4,620 cc) straight eight, but produced 125 bhp (five more than the One Twenty). Despite the familiar engine, few Clipper parts were interchangeable with other models. The chassis was entirely new: a double-drop frame allowed a lower floor without reducing road clearance. The engine was mounted well forward and the rear shocks were angled to assist the traditional Packard fifth shock in controlling side-sway. The front suspension was entirely new since the lower frame eliminated the need for Packard's traditional long torque arms, the same reason Rolls-Royce and Bentley, despite copying nut for bolt Packard's prewar Saf-t-fleX i.f.s, also went with a similar GM-type i.f.s. in the '56-on Silver Cloud/Bentley S series; a double-link connection between the Pitman arm and steering brackets, with a crossbar and idler arm and two cross tubes, controlled wheel movement.

The 1941 Clipper was the widest production car in the industry and the first to be wider than it was tall—a foot wider. The body from cowl to deck was a single piece of steel, the largest in the industry, and the floor pan had only one welded seam from end to end. Single pieces of sheet metal comprised the rear quarters and hood. The hood could be lifted from either side of the car or removed entirely by throwing two levers. Instead of the traditional third-side window, ventipanes were incorporated in the rear doors, providing controllable flow-through ventilation. The battery made its first move from under the seat to under the hood, where it stayed warmer and was more accessible. There was a "Ventalarm" whistle to warn when the tank was within a gallon of being full, and an accelerator-activated starter button, so the act of starting simultaneously set the automatic choke. Reithard's symmetrical dashboard contained a full ration of instruments, including an electric oil pressure gauge adapted from the One Sixty. Options included Packard's Electro-Matic vacuum-operated clutch, which let the driver ignore the clutch pedal in ordinary driving; "Aerodrive" (overdrive); an effective auxiliary under-seat heater, leather upholstery, fender skirts, and, for $275, air conditioning — a Packard first, introduced on all eight-cylinder 1940 models.

Introduced in April 1941, as a single four-door sedan model, the introductory Clipper was by no means a cheap or even medium-priced car. Per Packard chronicler MGH Scott, the Clipper was neither junior nor senior, and priced as it was since the days of strictly high hat luxe were over thanks to more affordable engineering improvements from the late '30s and more egalitarian times. The Clipper sold for around $1,400, in a market niche between the One Twenty and One Sixty, competing in the midst of Buick Roadmaster, Cadillac Sixty-One, Chrysler New Yorker, Lincoln Zephyr. Despite a mid-year start, the Clipper garnered 16,600 sales for the 1941 model year, eclipsing the total year's 17,100 less expensive One-Twenties. By the 1942 model year, Clipper styling spread through the Packard line, except where special tooling existed—convertibles, taxis, wagons, and commercial cars. However, the market slot occupied by the 1941 Clipper was abandoned, recreating a gap between the base 282-ci Clipper Custom ($1.341) and the 356-ci One-Sixty Clipper ($1,688).

The bulk of the 1942 production was concentrated on the 120-inch (3,000 mm) wheelbase junior models, but the One Sixty and One Eighty Clippers proved conclusively that Packard was as much a builder of luxury cars as ever. The 1942 160/180 Clipper was 9.5 inches (240 mm) longer and 140 pounds (64 kg) heavier than its square-rigged 1941 predecessor, with wider cabin, nearly as much rear legroom as the long wheelbase 1941-42 160/180, which retained the old-style Packard body.

The smooth 356-cubic-inch (5,830 cc) straight-eight of the One Sixty and One Eighty Clippers, featuring a 104-pound (47 kg), nine-main-bearing crankshaft and hydraulic valve lifters, was the most powerful engine in the industry through 1948, exceeding Cadillac's V8 by 15 horsepower (11 kW). It could deliver 70 miles per hour (110 km/h) in second gear overdrive and take the 4,000-pound (1,800 kg) car to over 100 mph on Packard's Proving Grounds banked oval track. In 1950, ten years after Packard's nonpareil nine-main-bearing 356 inline 8 debuted, Rolls-Royce mirrored the design for their nine-main bearing, F-head 346-ci B-80 inline 8, used only in a handful of Phantom IVs produced solely for heads of state, military vehicles, and Dennis fire trucks. Like Packard's 245-ci six used in junior Clippers, Packard's 1940–50 356 Super-8 engine also appeared in marine guise 1947-51.

The top-of-the-line Clipper One Eighty offered two shades of leather or six colors of wool broadcloth upholstery, Mosstred carpeting from New York's Shulton Looms, walnut-grained instrument panels, amboyna burl garnish moldings, seatbacks stuffed with down and rear center armrests. Unlike any other contemporary, the post-war Custom Super's headliner was seamed fore to aft instead of sideways. Packard claimed that the unique headliner was adopted "to provide a more spacious feel to the interior."

With a nearly full line of Clippers, Packard managed to build 34,000 1942 models before production ceased in February (an annual rate of around 80,000). According to John Reinhart, there is no doubt that Clipper styling would have proliferated in 1943–45. "The next logical step would have been convertibles and commercials—and a wagon." But the war intervened. Whereas Cadillac with its greater facilities was able to field a complete line of restyled 1942s, including convertibles, all of which came right back in 1946, Packard was able only to add a club coupe body before the war.

The lower priced two-door club coupe was the sportier Clipper despite a weight saving of only 45 lbs., with about 40 built before production ended in February 1942; a single One Sixty the only example known to exist. Postwar, about 600 senior coupes were made, compared to about 6,600 senior sedans.

In 1946–47 the numerical designations were dropped, and the line consisted of Clipper Sixes and Eights on the 120-inch (3,000 mm) wheelbase and Supers and Custom Supers on the 127-inch (3,200 mm) wheelbase. For the first time there were now seven-passenger sedans and limousines, riding a 148-inch (3,800 mm) wheelbase. For their type, these "professional Packards" enjoyed success. They compare with Cadillac's 1946–47 Seventy-five, beating it not only by 15 horsepower (11 kW) but by a foot of wheelbase, yet selling for about the same $4,500–$5,000. Counting several thousand bare chassis supplied to commercial body manufacturers, the Seventy-five outsold the long-wheelbase Clipper; but for finished cars from the factory, production was about 3,100 cars each for 1946–47 combined.

Many economic experts predicted that the end of World War II would bring a severe recession or perhaps even another depression to the United States. They had history on their side because the US did experience a sharp, albeit brief economic downturn after World War I. Perhaps Packard's management team took these calamitous warnings to heart while planning its postwar strategy. If the economy were to fall, it would make sense to market the low-priced Packards—the Clipper Sixes and Eights—rather than the upmarket Supers and Custom Supers.

The postwar economy proved the experts wrong. It was healthy and many materials, notably sheet steel, were in short supply. Workers who would never have struck during the war, now demanded more money, and so the automakers and their suppliers endured a series of costly strikes. These factors, of course, strangled production. At the same time, Americans were willing to spend freely to acquire most anything—especially new cars. Packard could not produce cars in the numbers intended, and it was selling the less profitable junior-series models.

Packard management's chief interest after the war was in the same medium-priced cars that had saved it during the Depression, the Six and junior Eights. The company was still firmly run by President George Christopher, who had helped save it with the One Twenty. Christopher, a graduate of GM's Buick-Oldsmobile-Pontiac divisions. Christopher had junior Clippers in production by October 1945, but it was not until June 1946 that the first Super/Custom Super came down the line. Total Packard production in the first two postwar model years was 82,000, against 91,000 Cadillacs. The difference was that the vast bulk of Packard production was of Clipper Sixes and Eights priced $1,700–2,200. Other than the less popular Series 61 price leader, which replaced the LaSalle for 1941, postwar Cadillacs began at around $2,300. Packard could have built and sold as many senior Clippers as Cadillac did Series 62s and 60Specials, had Christopher and his team so chosen.

The long-wheelbase (147-inch) Clipper seven-passenger sedan and limousine were competitive with Cadillac and the low-volume Chrysler Crown Imperial (Lincoln had no long models) in the first two postwar years. Likewise, among owner-driver models, Packard had Cadillac neatly bracketed. The Cadillac Sixty-two sedan and coupe started around $2,300 in 1946—about the same price as the Super Clipper. Against Cadillac's $3,100 Sixty Special, which came only as a four-door sedan, Packard offered the more sumptuously trimmed Custom Super Clipper sedan or coupe for about the same money. The 1946–47 Cadillac Series 62 and 60 Special outsold the concurrent Packard Super and Custom Super Clipper three to one, simply because George Christopher's board chose to focus on building junior models, which accounted for 80% of Packard's postwar production.

This is a new point that has been missed in the many postmortems of Packard's fall: Reverting to strictly luxury cars would not have meant downsizing the labor force or contracting the facilities. The market for anything on wheels was bottomless; it did not matter whether the car cost $1,800 (Clipper Eight). $2,300 (Clipper Super) or $2,900 (Custom Super). It would have sold. Nor is this a hindsight judgment, since Packard management was capable of seeing this at the time. At the start of postwar car production, Fortune recorded a consensus that "there now exists a market for from 12 to 14 million cars", and that was in a day when three million or so cars was considered a very good year. "In 1941," Fortune continued, "The 32 million American families owned 29,600,000 cars . . . As 1946 began, the cars were down to 22 million which is not very far from the danger point (18 million) of a transportation breakdown . . . of this remaining total, at least half are in their last days." It did not take a mystic to comprehend these facts, as the late Hickman Price, Jr., who bought Willow Run for the Kaiser-Frazer partners, once said: "I believed we would have a period of three or four years—I remember putting 1950 as the terminal date in which we can sell everything we can make."

Almost immediately after production got rolling in 1945, chief stylist John Reinhart was told, much against his judgment, to update the Clipper. If Dutch Darrin had thought Packard loaded "gobs of clay" onto his original model in 1941, what must he have thought of the hideously bulbous 1948 models? Furthermore, there was no change in market orientation, still rooted firmly in the medium price field. Indeed, in 1948, the final year for President George Christopher, senior Packard production dwindled from 20 percent to 11 percent of total production, trailing Cadillac by tens of thousands. Packard, as a later president, James Nance, stated, "handed the luxury car market to Cadillac on a silver platter."

Professional designers have contemplated continuations of the Clipper into 1948–49, with a broader range of body styles including hardtops and convertibles. Their designs were beautiful and would have kept pace with the all-new Cadillacs and Lincolns of 1949, allowing Packard to come back with its first postwar redesign in 1950. But the key failure was to reorder the corporation's priorities and establish it once again as the American luxury car it had been so successful for forty years.

Packard lost its battle for survival since the company could not achieve GM volume, it would have been smarter to extract more profit from each car built. Not only were customers standing in line, but by putting top-of-the-line Packards on the road, the public's image of Packard as a luxury car builder would have been enhanced.

The 1948 facelift lost the design continuum the Clipper had offered. Though it retained the Clipper's basic shell, the 1948 model bore no resemblance to its predecessor. The bulbous 1948 design became known to some as the "upside-down bathtub" or "pregnant elephant" and Packard's market share declined.

The money spent on the facelift, as John Reinhart and others maintained, should have gone into an expansion of Clipper body styles to compete with Cadillac. Packard recognized this too late when it brought out a convertible as the first 1948 body style—a model it should have had by 1947 at the latest. Eighteen months later Cadillac was already out with the Coupe de Ville hardtop, while Packard's newest model was the Station Sedan.

By 1948, it was clear that the future of the car business belonged to the giants. At least one independent manufacturer was ready to make that happen; George W. Mason, President of Nash-Kelvinator. Mason wanted a postwar combination of independents, a fourth player in an automotive Big Four, with Packard as the luxury division. All independent automakers faced problems. By 1954, there was only a "Big Two," as Chrysler's market share fell to 12.9%.

All Cadillacs had been downsized for 1936, and were effectively junior cars ever since, increasingly sharing components with GM's other divisions. Despite the company's postwar cash reserves, Packard continued production of its now-dated L-head straight-eight engines through 1954, competing against a field of OHV V8s. Moreover, the small independent automakers could not achieve unit costs and tool amortization down to GM/Ford levels, nor afford the requisite TV advertising and annual model changes.

== 1946–1947 ==
For 1946–1947 all Packards used Clipper bodies and the "Clipper" name.

== 1948–1952 ==
The Clipper nameplate was dropped for 1948 as Packard issued its Twenty-Second Series automobiles, which, while proclaimed by the company as "all-new," were actually restyled Clippers. Only the 1941–47 Clipper's roof and trunk lid survived. At this time, Packard's president, George Christopher, insisted upon concentrating on sales of the company's lower-priced cars, while longtime competitor Cadillac focused its attention on the upper end of the market.

The Twenty-Second and Twenty-Third Series (from mid-1949) cars wore the "upside-down bathtub" styling that was briefly in vogue in the late 1940s. Unfortunately for Packard, Nash, Lincoln-Mercury, and Hudson, the four manufacturers who embraced this type of styling, General Motors introduced designs that were lower-slung, more tightly drawn and less bulbous at around the same time. GM's designs caught the buying public's fancy, while the "bathtubs" quickly fell from favor.

Following a round of bitter corporate infighting in 1949, Packard management finally decided to phase out the "bathtubs" and create the all-new Twenty-Fourth Series for 1951. The new "high-pockets" design (so-called because of its high beltline) was much more modern. However, Packard continued to push hard into the lower end of the mid-priced field with its new "200" and "250" models. While the 250 hardtop and convertible, which would soon be named Mayfair, were an attempt to market upscale coupes which were slightly less bulky than the high-line sedans, and were decorated with chrome side scallops reminiscent of the top-shelf 400, the 200 was a full-range, middle-priced line continuing to compete with Oldsmobile, DeSoto, Mercury, the junior Hudsons, and others. James J. Nance became the company's president in 1952, and he immediately set to work on divorcing the lower-priced cars from the higher-end Packards. To this end, he decreed that the 200 and 200 Deluxe would be consolidated into a new line of Clippers for 1953.

== 1953–1956 ==
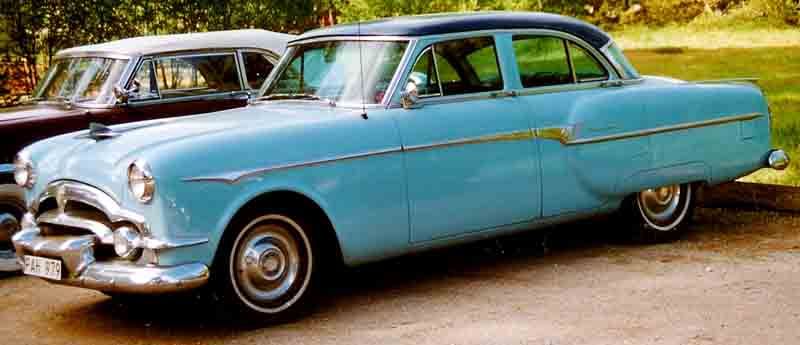
1953 Packard Clipper Sedan

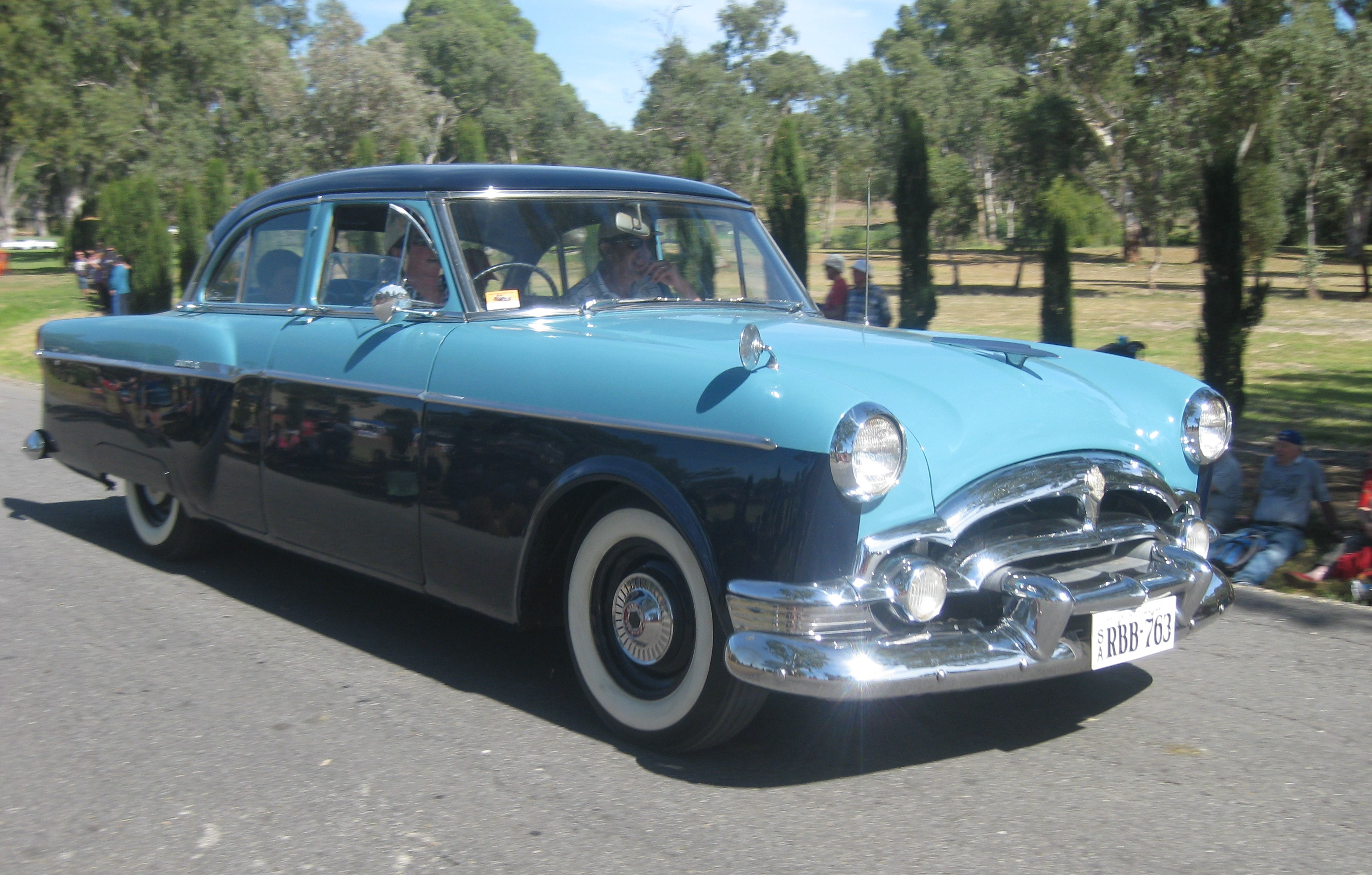
1954 Packard Clipper De Luxe Touring Sedan

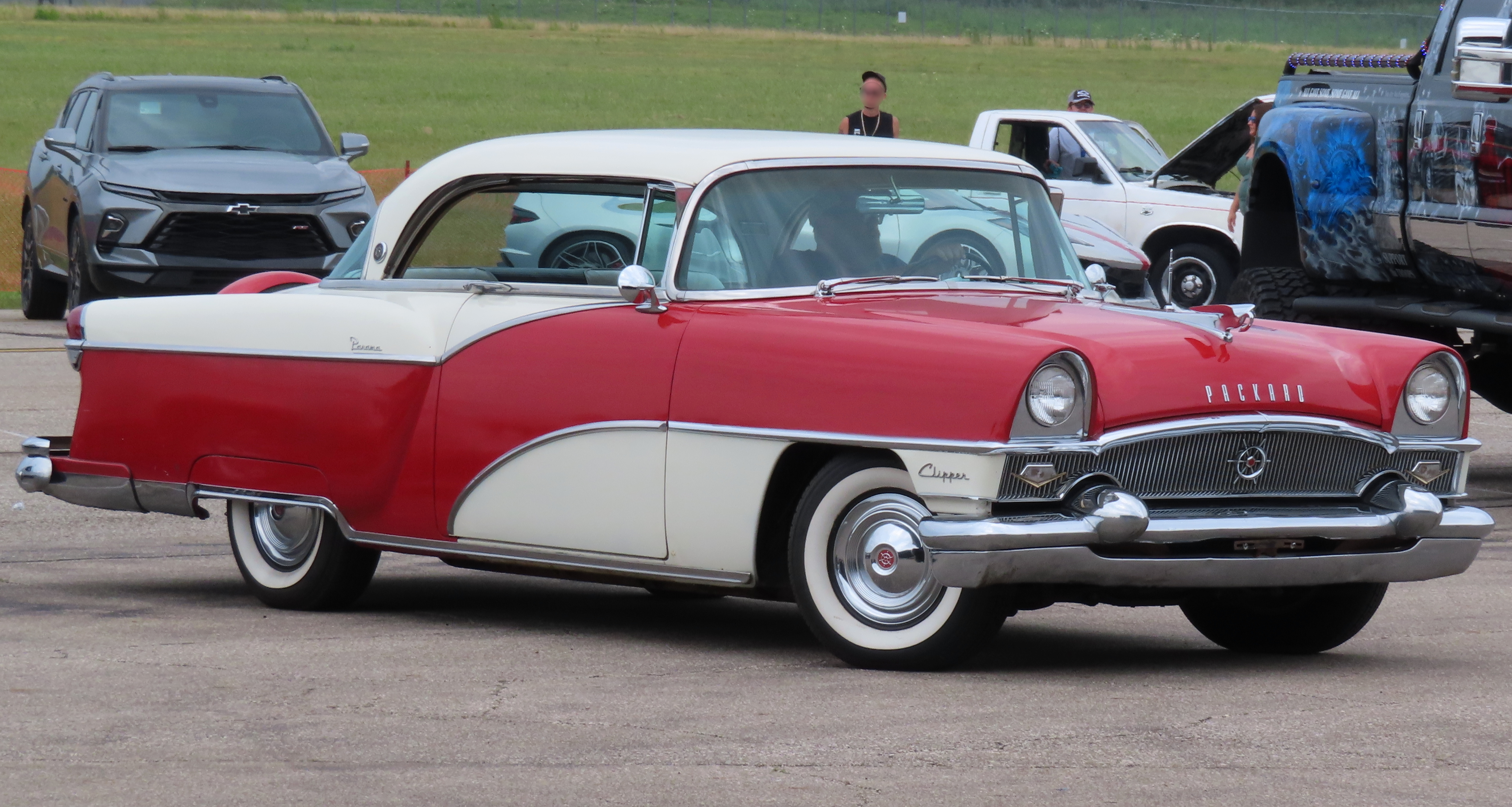
1955 Packard Clipper Panama

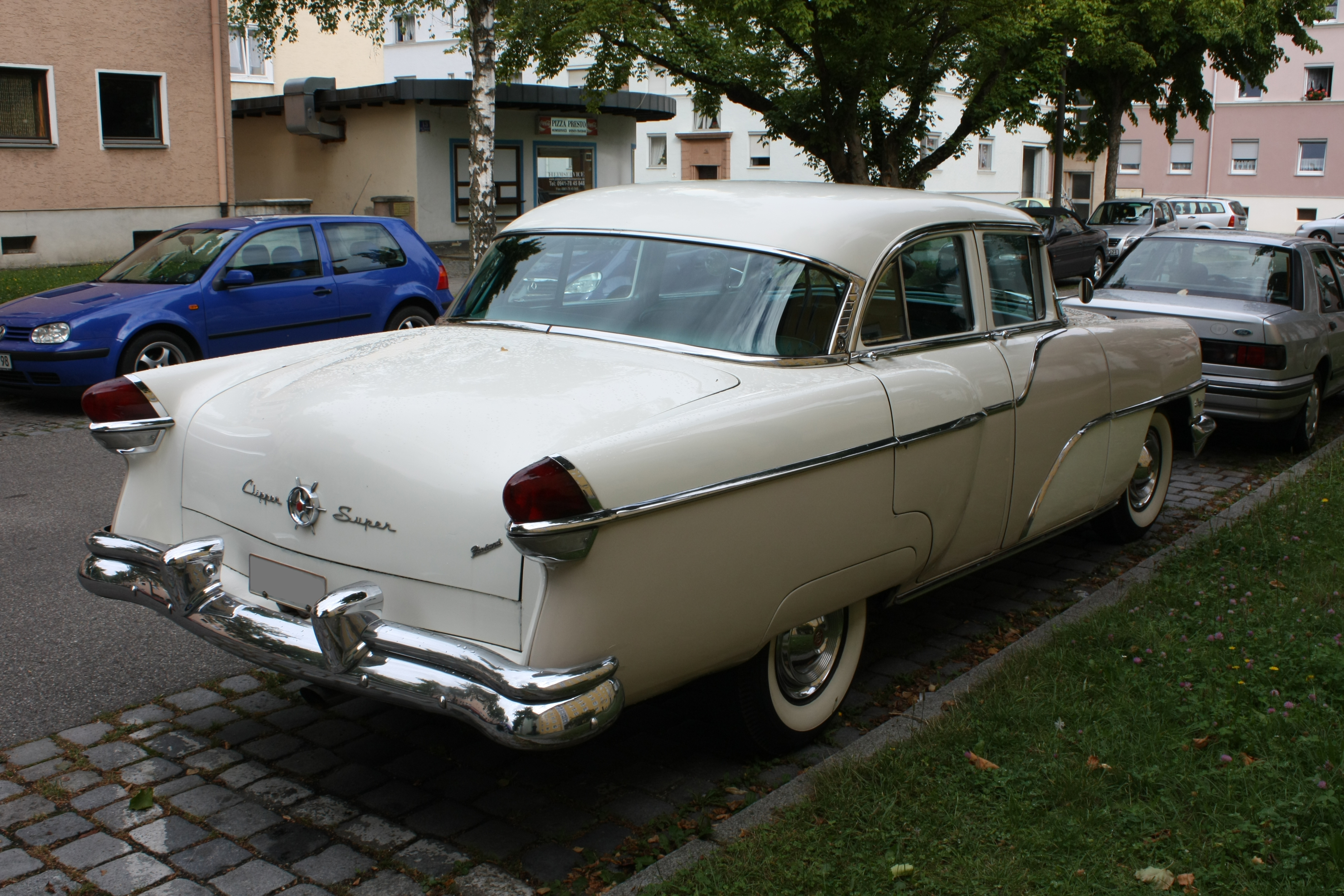
1955 Packard Super Clipper

Nance originally hoped to introduce the new "Clipper" as a stand-alone marque, targeting the mid-range price field, which he believed was dragging down the Packard image. When word was leaked to the Packard dealer network that they would be losing their best-selling Packard model to "Clipper", they balked. As an appeasement, Nance rolled the Clipper out as a Packard and worked to transition the cars toward their own make. Thus, the Packard Clipper name was reintroduced and applied to the company's entry-level models, previously known as the Packard 200, beginning in 1953. Clippers were available in Special and Deluxe trim models, as two- and four-door sedans. A 1953 Clipper went from 0 to 60 mph in 17.6 seconds in a Popular Mechanics test. The turning circle was 41 ft.

For 1954, the "Clipper by Packard" was given its own unique rear fender trim and taillights to further differentiate it from traditional Packards. The cars were also available with a distinctive two-tone paint pattern. For 1955, Packard became a marque in the newly formed Studebaker-Packard Corporation. The 1955 Clipper Custom offered torsion-bar suspension something not offered on other models, which only offered coil and leaf spring suspension. It also had a power steering option and an all-new Packard built V8 displacing 320 CID and was increased to 352 CID in 1956. Drivers enjoyed the comfortable ride but complained of door rattles and poor workmanship. Length was 215 15/32 inches long.

The Packard Clipper Constellation was a two-door hardtop automobile produced by the Studebaker-Packard Corporation for the 1955 and 1956 model years. The 1955 model was a Packard product and sold as part of the Packard Clipper line; for 1956, Clipper split from Packard, becoming its own make.

Series	Model	Model No.	Body Style	Price (US$)
5540	Deluxe	5522	Touring Sedan	2,586
5540	Super	5542	Touring Sedan	2,686
5540	Super Panama	5547	Hardtop	2,776
5560	Custom	5562	Touring Sedan	2,926
5560	Custom Constellation	5567	Hardtop	3,076

A total of 8,039 Clipper Deluxe, 14,995 Super and 15,380 Custom were built during model year 1955.

== Separate marque: 1956 ==
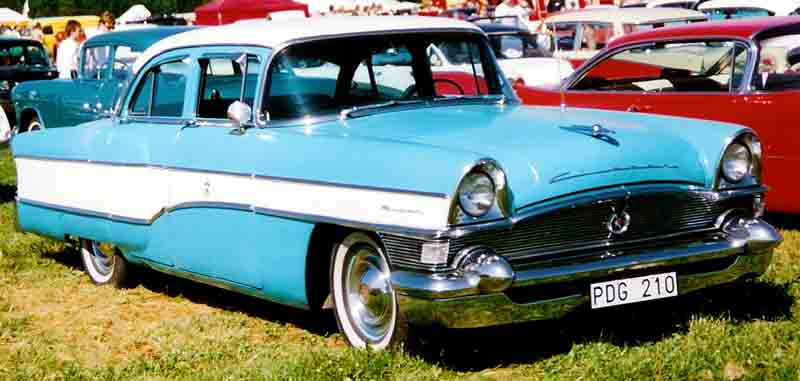
1956 Clipper Super Touring Sedan, model 5642

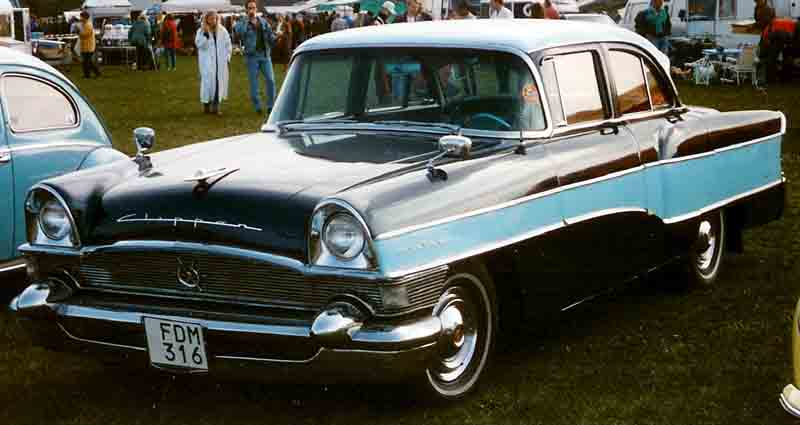
1956 Clipper Custom Touring Sedan, model 5662

Packard's president. James Nance, believed that as a Packard line, the Clipper models were diluting Packard's standing as a luxury automobile marque.

There were also concerns that the Clipper was cannibalizing the sales of other models in the lineup. However, this had more to do with the ill-planned market differentiation strategy and less with the car itself. Despite being marketed to a lower-income bracket consumer, the 1956 Packard and Clipper are essentially the same cars. The only real difference lay in the length, with Packard featuring a slightly longer wheelbase.

However, company pushed ahead with making Clipper a separate nameplate. For the 1956 model year, the status of being a stand-alone make was emphasized by creating a separate Packard Clipper division within Studebaker-Packard. Clipper's logo was a ship's wheel.

The automaker required Packard-franchised dealers to also execute a separate Clipper Dealer Sales Agreement in order to sell the line. Studebaker agencies in areas not covered by separate Packard dealers were allowed to sign Clipper franchise agreements (and could also take on the regular Packard line as well, subject to factory approval).

Clippers began receiving unique trim and rear quarter panels in 1954, and when Packard introduced its redesigned model in 1955, the Clipper retained its older rear sheet metal while receiving two-tone combinations that were unique to its models. For 1956, the Clipper received new rear sheet metal and tail-light treatments. Clipper marketed two hardtop coupes, the Panama in the Super model line and Constellation in the Custom range. Both were carry-over model names from the 1955 model year.

Around mid-1955, dealers began complaining that consumers were lukewarm to the cars because they were true Packards and demanded that the Packard name appear somewhere on the cars. Nance refused at first, feeling that placing the Packard name on the cars would undo his plan to save the Packard name for luxury automobiles. However, when dealers began defecting to Mercury franchises, Nance gave in, fearful that the shrinking number of dealers would harm the company more than just the Packard marque. A small "Packard" script emblem began to be placed on the decklids of newly built Clippers. In a complete reversal of Nance's strategy, the emblems were also made available for placement on already-built cars that were languishing on dealers' lots.

By the summer of 1956, Studebaker-Packard was in financial trouble. The Packards and Clippers were not selling at anywhere near a profitable level, and the company's creditors refused to advance any further money to the company for new tooling that would have allowed Nance to finally realize his ultimate goal of sharing body components among the company's three lines of cars. In late July, the last Packards and Clippers rolled out of the Conner Avenue factory.

Following the closure of Packard's Detroit, Michigan factory in 1956, the Clipper marque was discontinued, although the Clipper name was applied to 1957 Packards built at Studebaker's South Bend, Indiana factory.

=== 1956 models and production ===
- Clipper Deluxe
  - 4dr Sedan (5,715)
- Clipper Super
  - 4dr Sedan (5,173)
  - 2dr Panama hard-top (3,999)
- Clipper Custom
  - 4dr Sedan (2,219)
  - 2dr Constellation hard-top (1,466)

Total Clipper production for 1956: 18,572 (excludes exports, if any)

== Studebaker-Packard: 1957 ==
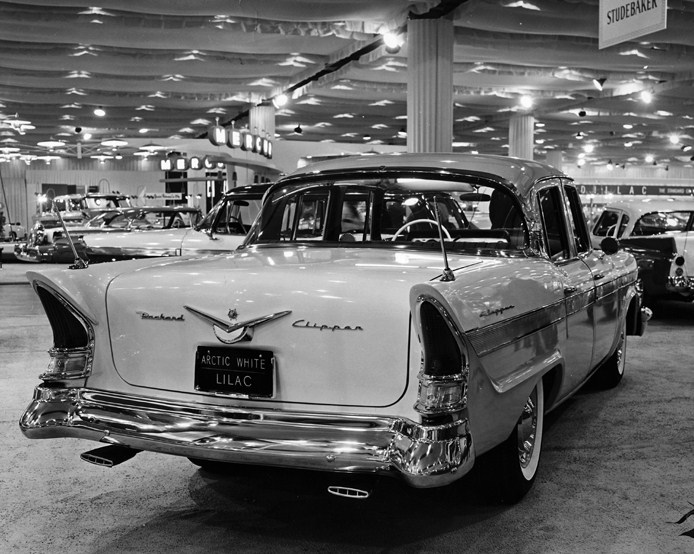
1957 Packard Clipper at a period Auto Show

Following the closure of the Detroit, Michigan Packard plant, Studebaker-Packard entered into a management contract with the Curtiss-Wright Company. Under C-W's president, Roy T. Hurley, S-P's new president Harold Churchill approved the production of a new Packard, to be built in Studebaker's South Bend, Indiana plant. The new Packards, originally to continue the Packard Executive nameplate, were to share the Studebaker President four-door sedan body and new four-door station wagon body as well. The total tooling cost of the new Packard was estimated at $1 million. At some point, however, the Executive name was dropped, as all of the Packards produced for 1957 carried the Packard Clipper name. Body styles were limited to a four-door "Town Sedan" and the "Country Sedan" station wagon.

In order to keep the tooling cost as low as possible, trim components from the 1956 Clippers were used. This was done to make the 1957 model differ in appearance from the President; outside, this included a narrower Packard-style front bumper and 1956 Clipper tail lamps and chromed wheel covers. Other differences include finned rear fenders and differing rear wheel panel treatments, as well as a wide chrome strip across the length of the car (extending across the tailgate on station wagons). Inside, the cars' dashboards were fitted with the same basic instrument cluster as used in the previous two years, while trim levels were generally higher than for Studebakers.

Sales of the new Clippers were not great; historians differ as to why, although the cars' obvious Studebaker origins (which led the new Clippers to be derisively nicknamed "Packardbakers" by many people) certainly did not help. Only about 4,800 were sold for the year, of which 869 were station wagons. The only engine option was the supercharged 289 cu in (4,740 cc) Studebaker V8.

For 1958, the Clipper name was discontinued, and the few Packard automobiles that were produced (four-door sedans, station wagons, and two-door hardtop coupes) were simply known by their marque name. The only exception to this was the Packard Hawk, which was based on the Studebaker Golden Hawk.

== Australian assembly ==
The Packard Clipper was assembled in Australia from CKD kits circa 1955.
