= Show car =

Custom-made automobile for display

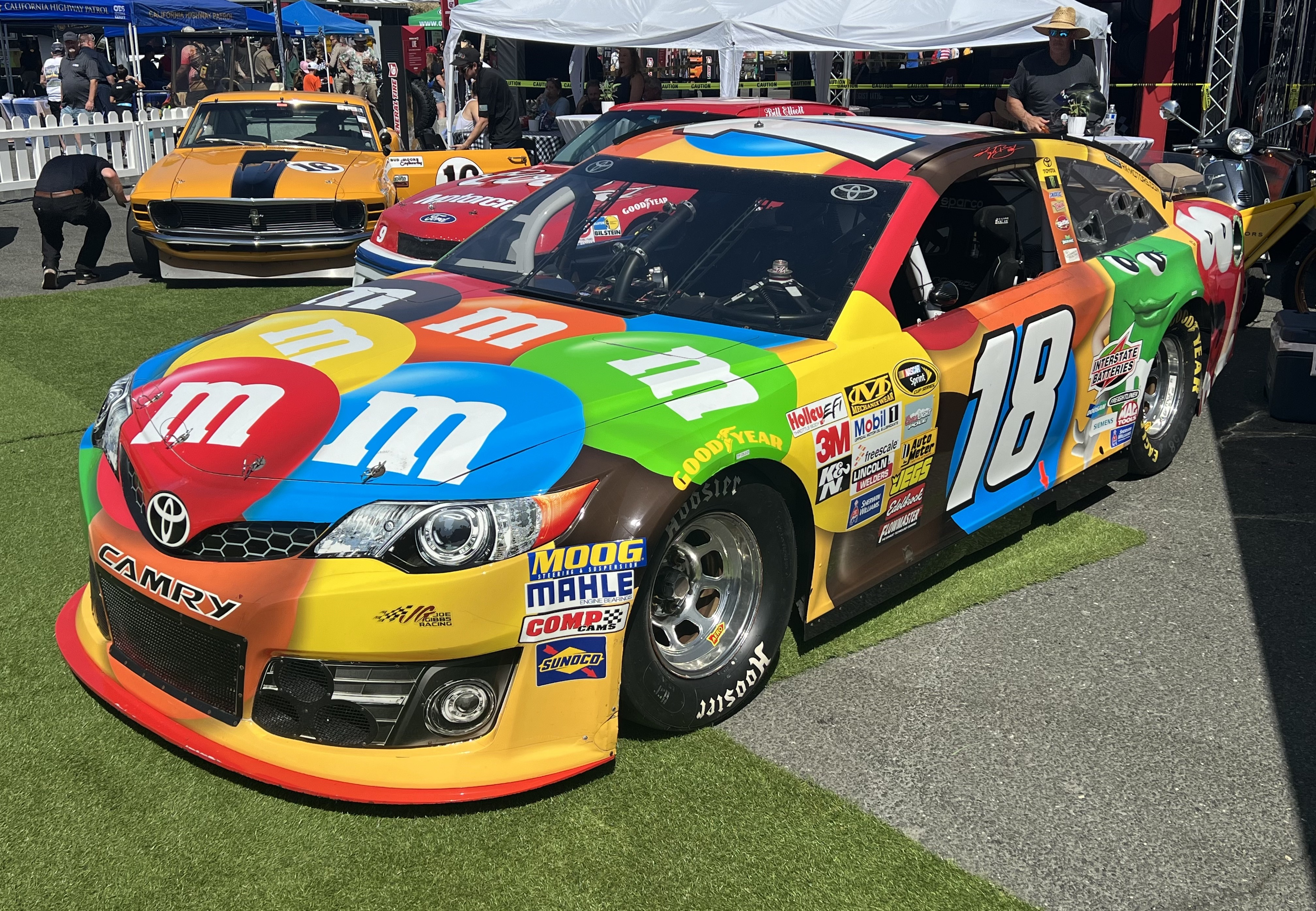
Kyle Busch M&M's Showcar Sonoma in 2024

A show car, sometimes called a display car, is a custom-made automobile created specifically for public display, rather than sale. They are shown at auto shows and other exhibitions. Show cars can either come from car companies or from private individuals.

Corporate show cars generally fall into one of three categories:

- Cars intended to preview a new production model or redesigned model, either to assess or to whet the public appetite. Such preview show cars may be thinly disguised or slightly retrimmed versions of the eventual production model, painted in bold or unusual colors or fitted with unusual trim to attract attention.
- Cars intended to assess the public reaction to a type of model, or a particular styling theme or feature. A prominent example was the 1938 Buick Y-Job, a custom-built Buick created by General Motors styling chief Harley Earl for his own use; although it was never produced, it contained features such as hidden headlights that later became GM styling features. Such cars typically are not intended for production themselves, but may become the basis of a production model if demand is high enough. The Dodge Viper is notable example of the latter.
- Styling exercises built to reward successful designers, letting them blow off steam with a design more exciting than workaday, "cooking" sedans and trucks. Such exercises also serve to draw attention to the manufacturer's more ordinary products.

Privately owned show cars are cars extensively cared for by their owners primarily for the purpose of entering car shows and can be production models or custom-made, with custom painting and coatings.

Racing teams in sports such as NASCAR and IndyCar often have show cars for public display. These cars may or may not be race-ready, and are often older, retired cars, sometimes re-painted to match current competition liveries.

== History ==
The creation of show cars dates back to at least the 1920s, but reached its zenith in the United States in the 1950s, when most major U.S. automakers began to exhibit wild, fanciful dream cars. The preeminent dream car maker was GM, which displayed its work at a series of traveling Motorama shows, mounted at great expense and attracting much publicity. In the 1960s American show cars became substantially more mundane, slight variations on typical production models (with exceptions like Chevrolet's Mako Shark prototype). The practice of building them fell on hard times during the 1970s, when automotive whimsy was a low priority compared to safety, emissions control, and fuel economy. The practice was revived in the 1980s, and remains strong today both in the U.S. and abroad.

== See also ==
- Concept car
