= John A. Conde =

Automobile industry executive, author, and historian

- Born: March 25, 1918; St. Louis, Missouri
- Died: August 29, 2008 (aged 90); Bloomfield Hills, Michigan
- Occupations: Automotive executive, curator, historian, author

John A. Conde (25 March 1918 – 29 August 2008) was an American automotive executive, corporate historian, museum curator, author, and automotive historian. He contributed to corporate communications, historical preservation, museum curation, and automotive scholarship. Conde is recognized for establishing the corporate archives of American Motors Corporation (AMC). He collected historical records and helped to professionalize the study and documentation of automotive history.

== Early life ==
Conde was a St. Louis native. From an early age, he developed a lifelong interest in the history, evolution, and business of the automobile industry. His enthusiasm extended beyond automobiles themselves to the preservation of company records, technical literature, photographs, and historical documentation, interests that would define his professional and post-retirement career. Conde married Louise Conde, and they had two children, Camela (Pascarella) and Jeffrey Conde.

== Corporate career ==
Following the conclusion of World War II, Conde joined Nash-Kelvinator in 1945 as part of its public relations and communications department.

His position provided direct access to many of the automobile industry's influential executives and pioneers, including Charles W. Nash, Henry Ford, George W. Mason, George W. Romney, and Roy D. Chapin Jr.

Working within corporate communications, Conde prepared press releases, media materials, executive speeches, historical publications, and promotional literature that documented the company's operations and products during a transformative period for the American automobile industry. Over three decades, he became AMC's principal custodian of corporate history while advancing through communications and public relations roles.

One of the defining events of Conde's corporate career was his involvement in the negotiations that led to the 1954 merger of Nash-Kelvinator and Hudson Motor Car Company. The transaction created the American Motors Corporation (AMC), then the largest merger in the history of the U.S. automobile industry.

Following the merger, Conde remained with AMC, managing public relations while observing the company's strategic evolution from within. His long tenure provided a perspective on the leadership of top executives during periods of significant organizational change. Automotive historian Patrick R. Foster later recalled that when Roy Abernethy became AMC president in 1962, one of his first directives to Conde was to "help me get rid of this 'Romney' image," reflecting the company's effort to shift from its reputation for economical transportation toward larger, more luxurious, and performance-oriented automobiles. Conde remained skeptical of this strategic change. In a 1997 interview, he argued that AMC's investment in specialty and performance vehicles — including the Javelin, AMX, Marlin, and Pacer — diverted engineering and financial resources from projects that would have better served the company's long-term competitiveness. Conde maintained that greater investment in economical, fuel-efficient automobiles, and a modern four-cylinder engine program would have better aligned with George Romney's original vision and might have improved AMC's long-term prospects.

== Corporate archivist ==
Conde became one of the earliest advocates for preserving automotive corporate records as a part of industrial history. Recognizing the significance of AMC and its predecessor firms, he established the company's historical archives. This preserved photographs, engineering documents, brochures, correspondence, advertisements, and corporate publications. Between 1951 and 1976, Conde researched, compiled, and edited a series of nine internally produced volumes collectively known as the "Family Albums" covering Nash, Rambler, and American Motors. Produced primarily from factory photographs and company records, these publications document the visual history of the cars.

Outside his professional responsibilities, he was active within the automotive enthusiast community, participating in automobile clubs and historical organizations in the United States. He became known among collectors, restorers, researchers, and historians for his willingness to share knowledge and documentation.

== Museum work ==
Following his retirement from AMC in 1977, Conde transitioned from corporate to public history. He was appointed curator of transportation at The Henry Ford in Dearborn, Michigan. He expanded the museum's transportation collections, strengthened historical interpretation of the exhibits, promoted preservation initiatives, and increased public awareness of the museum's automotive holdings. His work there until 1981, emphasized historical accuracy, documentation, and the educational value of preserving transportation artifacts.

Conde played an influential role in organizations dedicated to preserving automotive history. In 1969, he became a founding member and director of the Society of Automotive Historians (SAH), one of the leading scholarly organizations devoted to automotive research. He was a regular contributor to the Society of Automotive Historians Journal, providing details such as the 1904-1912 American Napier in the June 1975 edition. He later served as a vice-president and two terms as the society's president from 1984 to 1985, helping expand its publications, membership, and academic standing.

Conde also served as trustee of the National Automotive History Collection (NAHC) at the Detroit Public Library and was a member of the board of trustees of the Auburn Cord Duesenberg Automobile Museum. Among his volunteer contributions was cataloging and identifying the Packard company's photographic archive, which was donated to the Detroit Public Library. His expertise in identifying vehicles, production dates, and historical context improved the research value of the collection.

== Author and researcher ==
Conde was regarded as an authority on automotive literature, historical documentation, and factory sales materials. Over several decades, he assembled one of the largest private collections of original automotive sales catalogs, owner's manuals, service publications, photographs, dealer literature, and factory documents. He identified every piece with its date and source, marked photocopies with the owner and the date of the photocopy, and typed descriptive notes at the front of file folders. His personal archive became an important research resource. He regularly attended the annual Antique Automobile Club of America (AACA) Eastern Fall Meet in Hershey, Pennsylvania, where he became known for identifying rare automotive documentation. These were opportunities for others to begin collecting documents and also begin writing automotive histories.

As an author, Conde published historical articles in automotive publications. Conde was one of the contributors to "The American Car since 1775," a comprehensive book published in 1971 by the editors of Automobile Quarterly. Between 1984 and 1996, he contributed to Collectible Automobile magazine, examining manufacturers, industry developments, and significant twentieth-century vehicles. He was also a frequent guest speaker at museums, historical societies, and automobile clubs, presenting lectures on automotive history, archival preservation, and corporate development.

== Books ==
- The Cars That Hudson Built (1980) ISBN 9780960504800

Based on more than 25 years of research, this volume documents the complete history of the Hudson Motor Car Company, including its engineering achievements, product development, corporate leadership, and its 1954 merger with Nash-Kelvinator. This book is heavily illustrated, providing a detailed history of Hudson, Essex, and Terraplane cars produced between 1909 and 1957.

- Cars With Personalities (1982) ISBN 9780960504817

Drawing upon research conducted during his tenure at the Henry Ford Museum, this collection presents historical essays examining distinctive automobile designs, notable manufacturers, engineering innovations, and the personalities who shaped the American automobile industry. It has been reviewed as a "favorite 'general' book" about classic automobiles.

== Legacy ==
Conde died at age 90 and was interred at the Pine Lake Cemetery, West Bloomfield, having lived much of his life in the city of Bloomfield Hills, Michigan. He occupies a place in American automotive history as both a participant in and chronicler of the industry's post-war development. His collections and documentary work are available at the University of Wyoming library. Brigham Young University houses his records related to George W. Romney, while Conde's "St. Louis Auto Manufacturers Collections" is at the St. Louis Public Library.
