= Roy Abernethy =

Chairman and chief executive officer of AMC (American Motors Corporation)

- Born: November 29, 1906; Pennsylvania
- Died: February 28, 1977 (aged 70); Jupiter, Florida
- Awards: Automotive Hall of Fame

Roy Abernethy (29 September 1906 – 28 February 1977) was an American automobile industry executive and CEO of American Motors Corporation (AMC) from February 1962 to January 1967. Before AMC, Abernethy had been with Packard Motors and Willys-Overland. Abernethy replaced George W. Romney, who resigned from AMC to become the Governor of Michigan.

== Background ==
Roy Abernethy was a native of Monterey, Pennsylvania, and his first job was caring for coal‐mine mules. He moved to Pittsburgh to become an apprentice mechanic and he also took night courses in engineering at the Carnegie Institute of Technology. He began his automotive industry career in 1926 as an apprentice mechanic at luxury automaker, Packard, earning 18 cents per hour. He then moved up establishing success in auto sales, reaching US$1 million in Packard vehicles in a single year from his dealership in Hartford, Connecticut. Abernethy also held the post of vice president of sales at Willys.

== Changing AMC ==
Rumors in late 1953 were circulating about the small automakers, that together held only about 6% of the total market in the United States, about cutting costs and enhancing their sales distribution as strategies to counter the intense competition from the "Big Three" domestic firms (General Motors, Ford, and Chrysler). On 14 January 1954, the boards of Nash Motors and Hudson Motor Car Company agreed to merge the two automakers. The deal was finalized and American Motors was officially formed on 1 May 1954.

The new company hired Abernethy in 1954. During AMC's formative years, the company struggled with costs and sales. Abernethy became vice president of sales and concentrated on building AMC's sales and distribution network. He recognized that promotion and advertising are useless without a strong dealer organization, so his first task was to convert every Hudson and Nash dealer into an AMC dealer. He then kept many of these dealers allied with AMC, thus helping to keep the corporation afloat, until AMC found its compact car niche under Romney's leadership. He was known to fly 50,000 miles (80,000 km) a year to make AMC synonymous with the compact car. Abernethy achieved sales successes for the company. By 1962, Rambler ranked third in U.S. sales among all car brands.

The "rigidly conservative" Romney resigned from running AMC in February 1962 to be elected governor of Michigan. On 12 February 1962, the AMC board of directors selected the 56-year-old Abernethy to replace Romney. This was the first time the company had separated the position of president from the chairperson of the board. Abernethy became responsible for day-to-day operations as president, while Richard E. Cross, the automaker's legal counsel and new chairman, was now called AMC's chief executive officer.

Both took command of a financially strong company (working capital increased from a low of $46 million in 1957, to $103 million, and the firm eliminated all long-term debt), with sales increasing from $362 million (91,469 automobiles) in 1957, to more than $1 billion (422,273 total units) in 1960. Abernethy predicted a total of 450,000 Ramblers to be delivered for the 1962 year, despite increasing competition from the new domestic-made compact cars offered by the Big Three. However, Abernethy "was more or less given an anchor and told to swim" after taking over the automaker from Romney. He "may lack some of the eloquence of his predecessor, George Romney, who revived the company in the late 1950s, but he makes up for it with vocal volume." One of the first tasks for the small automaker was to make its capital work harder in the face of competition with the automotive giants.

Abernethy continued Romney's prohibition on automobile racing, which had been instituted by the Automobile Manufacturers Association (AMA) in 1957. He made AMC observe both the letter and spirit of AMA's resolution, and was against a renewal of the auto industry's horsepower race by offering ever more powerful engines, as well as corporate sponsorship of activities that glamorize speed and performance.

Corporate advertising answered the question "Why don't we enter high-performance Rambler V-8s in racing?" with "Because the only race Rambler cares about is the human race." The "messianic fervor with which both former AMC president George Romney and his successor, Roy Abernethy, spread the message of fundamental motoring" helped solidify the image of the "Rambler driver" - a market segment that finds "any forms of performance repugnant." The anti-racing advertisements brought about jokes and criticisms often describing the reason why AMC was not into racing was its cars were too slow.

Nevertheless, in mid-1963 AMC announced a new 287 cu in (4.7 L) V8 option in the Rambler Classic models (which were previously available only with I6 engines, and the V8s reserved for the Ambassador line) as well as made a partial attempt to tap into the rapidly growing muscle and performance car image by introducing the more personal luxury oriented Rambler Marlin midway in the 1965 model year. The mid-sized two-door fastback Marlin made the public "aware of changes in Rambler's styling - the reaction is favorable." As AMC publicly disavowed any interest in automobile competition, Rambler's market performance reached record levels in 1964, placing the brand in third-place position in the domestic sales race..

Abernethy was a big man at 237 pounds (108 kg) — smoking ten corona cigars a day — and had big ideas for the company. He was convinced that with the right marketing AMC could take on the low-priced competitors - Ford, Chevrolet, and Plymouth - model for model, if the company could shed its "economy car" reputation. In contrast to Romney, who focused on compact-sized cars, the automaker's new head, "Abernethy looked at the company's volume and decided it meant that AMC should go toe-to-toe with Ford, Chevy & Plymouth."

Abernethy decided that the automaker needed a new image pulling aside John A. Conde stating, "John, you've got to help me get rid of this "Romney' image." A stunned Conde, hardly believing what he heard, replied, "Okay, Roy, I will." The focus on Rambler's leadership in quality and economy quickly shifted to stress styling and features, which also happened to follow the changing marketplace that was moving to larger cars with more power and luxury. However, this rapid image changeover to eliminate the "practical but boring" image confused traditional Rambler buyers.

Abernethy said repeatedly that AMC's "main problem was its image lag — the fact that too many people still thought of American Motors as the builder of 'plain Jane' compacts." He also started to move the Ambassador upscale to compete with other manufacturers' full-size cars. Moreover, larger models typically return bigger profits. Offering larger, and often more prestigious or "halo cars", can also help make the firm's smaller models look more attractive to consumers. Thus, as part of this vision, Abernethy put into motion a complete remake of AMC's corporate identity and marketing mix that would divorce its larger car lines from its Rambler brand and its perceived "negative" compact car image. Even after over a year as the president of the company, Abernethy continued to think of himself as a salesman and a student of other phases of the automobile business from assembly line to purchasing problems.

Abernethy also reversed Romney's plans for AMC which called for maximum parts compatibility across all AMC vehicle lines. The first models with Abernethy's corporate strategy "in the business world's toughest race — the grinding contest against the Big Three automobile makers" were the cars introduced for the 1965 model year. They were called the "Sensible Spectaculars," with the new Ambassador billed as "a whole new horizon in size, style, stunning performance" for 1965. The 1965 models were a major makeover of the completely new platform that had just been introduced in 1963. American Motors' new cars included the stretched and more luxurious Ambassadors, as well as new convertibles for the large models. New styling, more powerful engines, and numerous comfort- and sports-type options were now emphasized. Abernethy even switched the automaker's advertising agency to promote "a better luxury and sports car image". However, Abernethy had his critics, who contended that AMC "had its great success when it was doing what the Big Three weren't doing".

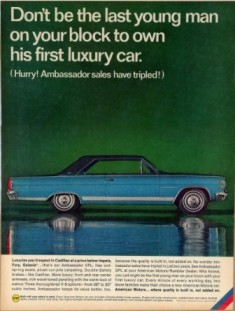
A 1966 magazine advertisement. "Luxuries you'd expect in a Cadillac at a price below Impala, Fury, Galaxie..."

The strategy shift at first seemed to be working, because sales of the redesigned 1965 and 1966 Ambassadors improved, even as AMC's overall production decreased from the record level achieved in 1963. However, corporate earnings per share were a meager 27 cents per share, the lowest since AMC made its famous compact car comeback in 1958. Investors received a message of the changing fortune of the automaker when the company's 1966 annual financial report was delivered in a plain brown wrapper, instead of the previous year's glossy cover.

A completely new design was also slated for the larger 1967 models. This strategy added $60 million in retooling costs, which was a major stretch for the company. The objective was to position the 1967 AMC Rebel and Ambassador designs on an equal basis with competitive models marketed by the Big Three Economy Brands, Ford, Chevy, and Plymouth. The new 1967 models also came with completely modern "GEN-2" AMC V8 engines. AMC also introduced a revolutionary guarantee: the engine and drivetrain were covered for five years or 50,000 miles (80,000 km). The media was positive in covering the new models, with experts such as Tom McCahill highly praising the new car's performance and ride comfort.

== The results ==
The evidence suggests that Abernethy was correct in making the Ambassadors more upscale with the new models that combined luxurious packaging and reasonable size; sales jumped from 18,647 in 1964 to over 64,000 in 1965. In 1966, they went to more than 71,000.

However, there were serious problems. The costs of developing the new cars and engines meant managers now had problems in securing working capital to keep the company going. American Motors' automobile sales dropped twenty percent in the first half of 1966, and the firm reported a fiscal six-month loss of $4.2 million on sales of $479 million. The situation was so bad that Robert B. Evans invested more than US$2 million because AMC's stock was selling for only 60 percent of the company's net worth; thus he became its largest stockholder and was named its chairman.

Abernethy was spending so much money that it was difficult for the company to turn a profit, even with the jump in sales in 1965 and 1966. Rumors started to have a snowball effect on the company. With the company's financial health and future in question, even an extra-long engine warranty appeared to be not enough to instill confidence among consumers. This was the strongest backing among all the automakers up to that time and promised to cover the entire vehicle for two years or 25,000 miles (40,000 km), as well as the engine and power train for five years or 50,000 miles (80,000 km).

The last quarter's sales for AMC ended 30 September 1966 (AMC was not on a calendar fiscal year), and they were disappointing. The company recorded a balance sheet loss of $12,648,000 for the year before tax credits and deferred tax assets. The 1965 and 1966 Ambassadors represented a crossroad in AMC's history, one at which some historians would say it took the wrong turn.

The company changed leadership from the likes of Romney, who defined the compact car segment, to Abernethy, "a likable super salesman who unfortunately landed at the top as the market began to quickly change." He discounted the obvious industry trend toward youthful performance models. Even with the Big Three entering AMC's market niche, Abernethy insisted that the compact car revolution was not over and predicted the automaker would sell 550,000 units in 1964, and that the total market would increase from 2.6 to 3 million compact-sized cars. However, Abernethy presumed that customers needed more choices among those available from the Big Three with their new models in the compact car market. American Motors lacked deep resources and market power.

The Kaiser-Frazer Corporation also tried unsuccessfully to challenge the Big Three market leaders in their existing product segments. In 1965, the Kaiser family decided to sell the Jeep operations and charged Stephen Girard to find a buyer. He was friends with Roy D. Chapin Jr., and lobbied AMC's president to buy the light utility vehicle business. A tentative deal with Girard fell apart when Henry Kaiser demanded a steeper price and Abernethy refused.

In the five years of Abernethy's tenure as president, the company went from a profitable operation to a losing one. Abernethy was forced to "drop out of the management team" by taking an "early retirement" from the company on 9 January 1967. With him went Evans, who was replaced as president by William V. Luneburg, AMC's group vice president of automotive operations. Abernethy remained for a time on the company's board after his resignation as president, stepping down at the same time as president of the Automobile Manufacturers Association.

After Abernethy's departure, AMC's new management team decided to enter motorsports to gain exposure and publicity and to develop a "performance" image. The automaker joined the domestic Big Three's “Race on Sunday, Sell on Monday” philosophy. A new position, Performance Activities Director, with Carl Chamakian, was established to get AMC automobiles into racing and attract a younger customer base during the height of the muscle car era.

== Legacy ==
Abernethy had two children: a son, Lee Roy Abernethy (who retired as a senior vice president at the Bank of New York and served as a consultant to the Bank of Taiwan), and a daughter, Phyliss Abernethy Hendry.

He died in Jupiter, Florida, where he had spent the decade after leaving AMC. He was remembered as heading the automaker "in the stormy post-Romney '60s" and as "big, gregarious... first, last and always a salesman." Abernethy also "had a reputation for tempering his immense personal drive with considerateness for others, and he seemed to thrive on tough challenges."

== Award ==
In 1971, Abernethy received the "Distinguished Service" citation from the Automotive Hall of Fame. The nonprofit organization honoring and celebrating entrepreneurs, innovators, and leaders who have fundamentally shaped the global automotive industry recognized Abernethy's work at Packard and Willys-Overland, as well as his "valuable qualities that led him to top management and leadership at American Motors Corporation."

Business positions
Preceded by George W. Romney	President of American Motors; 1962–1967	Succeeded by Roy D. Chapin Jr.
