= George Tiedeman =

American politician

45th

Mayor of Savannah, Georgia
- In office 1907–1913
- Preceded by: Herman Myers
- Succeeded by: Richard Davant

Personal details
- Born: September 11, 1861 Charleston, South Carolina, U.S.
- Died: June 30, 1935 (aged 73)
- Resting place: Bonaventure Cemetery
- Spouse: Sarah Floride Shivers
- Relations: Roy Chapin (son-in-law)
- Children: 3
- Parents: Otto Tiedeman (father); Amelia Corby Tiedeman (mother)

George Tiedeman (September 11, 1861 – June 30, 1935) was an American politician who served three terms as mayor of Savannah, Georgia (1907–1913).

== Biography ==
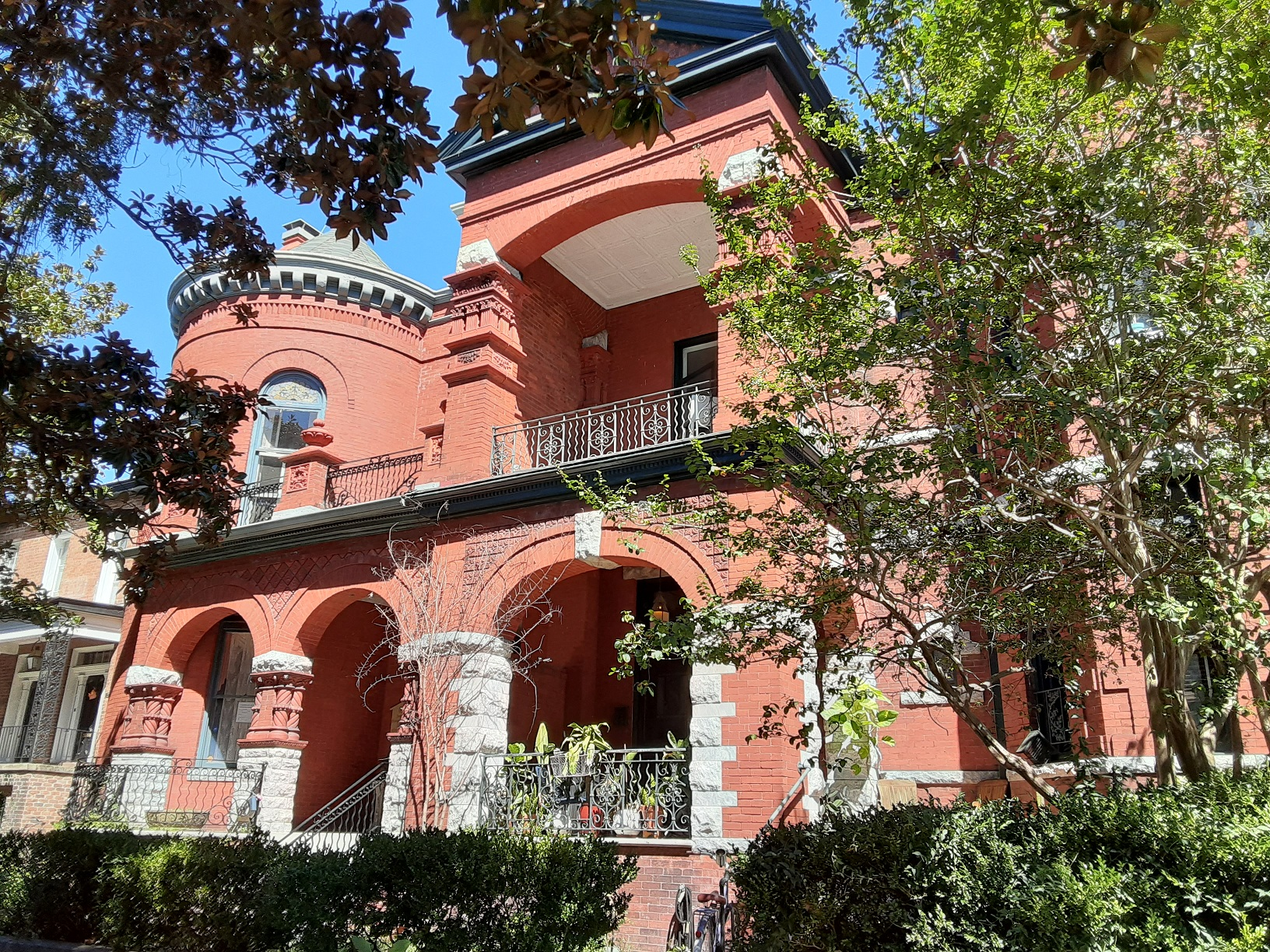
George Tiedeman house in Savannah

Tiedeman was born on September 11, 1861, in Charleston, South Carolina as the son of Amelia (née Corby) and Otto Tiedeman. His father had immigrated to South Carolina from Germany in 1840. His father worked as a grocer. Tiedeman had two brothers and a sister. In 1887, he moved to Savannah to work at his brother Irvin's wholesale grocery business. He became politically active and worked on the local Chamber of Commerce, the Board of Trade, and served as president of the Georgia State Savings Association.

Tiedeman won an election as an alderman and was subsequently elected to three terms as mayor. During his time as mayor, he helped bring the American Grand Prize auto race to Savannah, where it ran in 1908, and 1910-1911. As a great believer in technology, he outfitted the city with electric street lights and motorized the fire department.

== Personal life ==
In 1890, he married Sarah Floride Shivers (1867–1943) of Savannah. They had three children: Carsten (1902–1979), Inez, and George (1894–1901). Inez married Roy Chapin, the founder of the Hudson Motor Car Company. Tiedeman died on June 30, 1935, and is buried at the Bonaventure Cemetery in Savannah.
