= Herman Myers =

American mayor

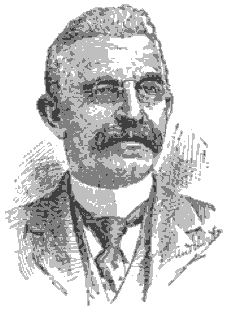

43rd

Mayor of Savannah, Georgia
- In office 1899–1907
- Preceded by: Peter Meldrim
- Succeeded by: George Tiedeman

Mayor of Savannah, Georgia
- In office 1895–1897
- Preceded by: John McDonough
- Succeeded by: Peter Meldrim

Personal details
- Born: January 18, 1847 Bavaria
- Died: March 24, 1909 (aged 62) Savannah, Georgia
- Political party: Democratic
- Occupation: Banker, politician

Herman Myers (January 18, 1847 – March 24, 1909) was a politician from Georgia, United States and a Mayor of Savannah. He was a Democrat.

== Background ==
He was a Jewish German-born immigrant and was born in Bavaria in 1847. His family moved to Virginia when he was a child.

== Political career ==
=== Alderman ===
Myers served as Councilmember from 1885 to 1895.

=== Mayor ===
He ran for Mayor of Savannah in 1895 and won the election. He lost re-election against Peter Meldrim in 1897. However, he was returned to office in 1899 and won re-election in 1901, 1903 and 1905.

The Union Station and the new City Hall were constructed under his tenure as mayor. Myers did not run for re-election in 1907.

== Death ==
He died in Savannah on March 24, 1909.

Political offices
Preceded by John McDonough, Democrat	Mayor of Savannah; 1895-1897	Succeeded by Peter Meldrim, Democrat
Preceded by Peter Meldrim, Democrat	Mayor of Savannah; 1899-1907	Succeeded by George Tiedeman, Democrat
