= John McDonough (Savannah mayor) =

John Joseph McDonough (August 3, 1849 – November 26, 1926) was a politician and businessman from Georgia, United States.

== Background ==
McDonough was born in 1849 in Augusta, Georgia, the son of an Irish-born immigrant. He received his education in Atlanta's public schools and graduated from the St. Francis Xavier College in New York City. He followed his father's footsteps and made a career in the lumber industry, as well as in machinery and foundry.

== Political career ==
McDonough was a Member of the Georgia House of Representatives in 1882 and 1883.

He was elected to a two-year term as Alderman on the City Council in 1889. He was elected Mayor of Savannah in 1891 over incumbent John Schwarz and won re-election in 1893.

He did not run for re-election in 1895. He ran for Mayor in 1899 but lost against Herman Myers.

== See also ==
- McDonough Row

== Footnotes ==
Political offices
Preceded by John Schwarz	Mayor of Savannah; 1891-1895	Succeeded by Herman Myers
