= Richard E. Cross =

American business executive

- Richard E. Cross at AMC in the 1960s
- Born: 1910; Madison, Wisconsin, U.S.
- Died: 31 August 1996 (aged 85-86); Rochester Hills, Michigan, U.S.
- Education: University of Michigan (engineering); University of Michigan (law)
- Occupations: Lawyer and business executive in the automotive industry
- Years active: 1938–1987
- Employer: American Motors Corporation
- Awards: Steering Wheel Award, the Automobile Club of Michigan

Richard Eugene Cross (1910-1996) was an American business executive in the automotive industry, a lawyer, and a civic leader.

== Education ==
Cross first studied engineering at the University of Wisconsin. He earned an undergraduate and then a law degree from the University of Michigan.

== Civic leadership ==
Cross participated in many civic activities and served as a leader in several organizations, including citizen groups focused on housing, schools, and police-community relations. He marched with Martin Luther King Jr. after the 1967 Detroit riot. He headed the Detroit Commission on Community Relations as the mayor's appointee from 1958 to 1962.

He was one of the first commissioners of the Michigan Department of Civil Rights, but in 1965, Cross declined a reappointment request by Governor George W. Romney because of the pressing business conditions at American Motors Corporation (AMC). For twenty years, Cross was head of the executive committee for the United Negro College Fund in Michigan. While lobbying International Olympic Committee president Avery Brundage in 1963 for Detroit to be selected for the 1968 Summer Olympics, Cross highlighted what he said were racial difficulties in other major, U.S. cities before asserting "we really have a fine, stable community here that is adjusting to the race problems in a very mature way."

Cross was a founder and chairman of the Hundred Club of Detroit, whose purpose was to help provide for the widows and dependents of police officers and firefighters who lost their lives in the line of duty.

Cross was elected in 1959 as the only United States representative to the Pan American Games Committee, on which he served until 1963. In 1960, he also served as a member-at-large of the United States Olympic Committee.

== Career at AMC ==
Cross was a "quiet, analytical attorney" who served as legal counsel for American Motors Corporation (AMC). He drew up the 1954 merger papers that created the new company from Nash-Kelvinator and Hudson Motor Car Company. Cross became a director of the company in 1954, and in 1959, a member of the policy committee.

He was one of a duumvirate succeeding George W. Romney, who at the time was technically on leave of absence to run for governor of Michigan. In 1962, at age 52, Cross was elected chairman of the board of directors as well as the chief executive officer (CEO), while Roy Abernethy was named president and chief operating officer (COO). The special meeting of the board of directors on 12 February had big smiles from Abernarhy, Cross, and Romney. The annual salary for Cross was $90,000, while Abernathy was granted $125,000.

The early 1960s were a turbulent time in AMC's strategy development. While the rest of the industry had record earnings, AMC's profits and return on sales dropped (from 7% of its sales in 1959, to an estimated 3.5% return in 1962). However, in September 1962, AMC paid off a US$80 million loan and became the only U.S. automaker free of long-term debt. Marketers could go after new markets. However, the company executives had developed a resistance to extensive restyling.

Cross supported the change away from Romney's legacy of the "economy-car" image and their "boxy" styling. This involved the automaker making significant design, styling, and marketing changes, as well as the addition of new convertibles and sporty models that Abernethy championed. The problem AMC faced was its small size and limited resources compared to the domestic Big Three automakers (General Motors, Ford, and Chrysler) and analysts were wondering if the fourth-place automaker ends up like the seven companies that stopped making cars since 1946.

Cross was confident in late 1964, during the launch of more powerful and luxurious 1965 models, that the company had sufficient volume "to stay anchored in this market" and continue to grow. He pointed out that AMC could now "buy raw materials and components as cheaply as our competitors ... and conduct the national advertising and sales efforts necessary to compete." However, Cross acknowledged limits because AMC's resources are much smaller than those of its competitors explaining, "Our product philosophy doesn't envision our being the style leader ... Public tastes have been fickle, and we can't afford to be stuck with any multimillion-dollar mistakes. Our job is to give the American consumer a fine, balanced product. If we made a big mistake, it might be fatal."

However, AMC's total national automobile market share declined from just over 5% to a "meager 3.71 percent ... the future of the smallest American car manufacturers looked bleak." As 1966 began, four top managers began working to steer the automaker from disaster. By spring, the automotive press and stockholders were concerned about the future of the firm and held Cross as Chairman of the Board "on the firing line" and also felt that others in AMC's management team "were out of touch with the car market." Cross launched an aggressive plan to find a merger partner or a buyout to continue operations. The automaker even contacted the U.S. Department of Justice about possible antitrust law implications with possible deals with firms that included Chrysler, Kaiser-Jeep, International Harvester, White Motor, BorgWarner, General Electric, as well as Sears, Roebuck. However, during January 1966 Robert B. Evans purchased 220,000 shares of AMC making him the largest single shareholder. By March 1966, Evans gained a seat on the board of directors. Evans was known for fixing companies in trouble and leading them into the future.

Evans publicly supported the leadership of Cross and Abernethy. In June 1966, Cross was forced to step down from the CEO post and was replaced by Evans. Cross became chairman of AMC's executive committee and could devote more time to his practice of law in Detroit, Michigan.

== Legacy ==
Cross served as a board member of more than twenty companies over the years. He died in his home in Rochester Hills, Michigan, on 31 August 1996. He has one son and three daughters.
