= Matthew M. Levy =

American lawyer and politician

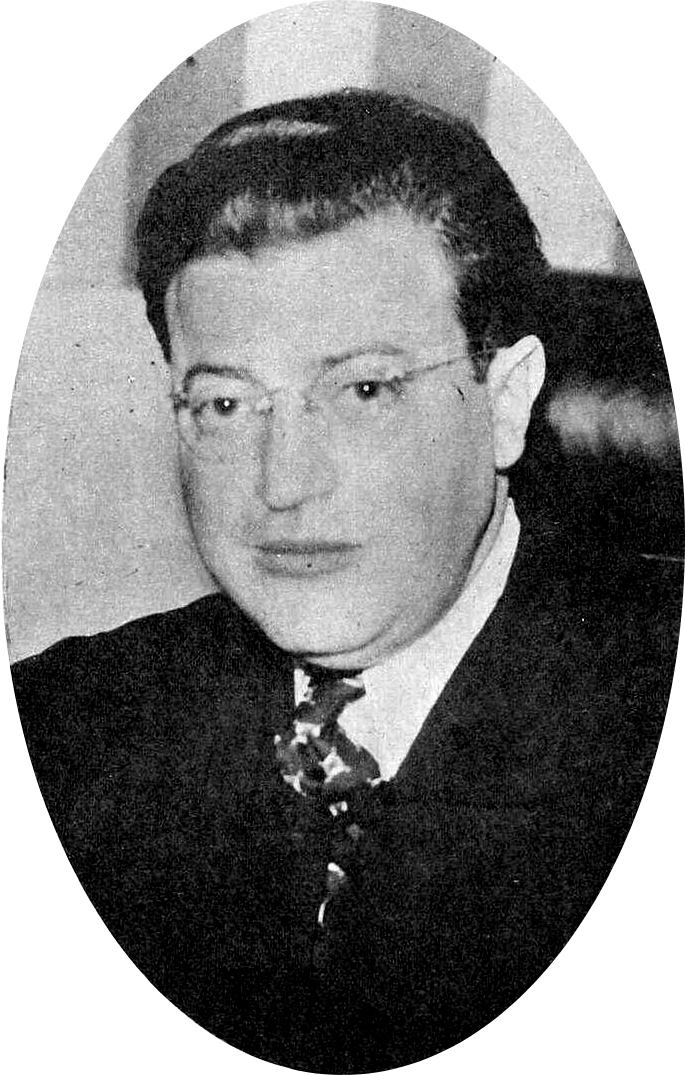
- Levy c. 1941

Justice of the New York Supreme Court
- In office January 1, 1951 – September 4, 1971

Judge of the New York City Municipal Court, 1st District
- In office January 1, 1938 – December 31, 1938
- Appointed by: Fiorello La Guardia
- Preceded by: Michael B. McHugh
- Succeeded by: Denis R. Sheil

Personal details
- Born: Matthew Malitz Levy; March 1, 1899 Brest-Litovsk, Congress Poland, Russian Empire
- Died: September 4, 1971 (aged 72) New York City, U.S.
- Party: Socialist (before 1936); American Labor (1936–1944); Liberal (after 1944); Democratic (after 1950)
- Other political affiliations: Social Democratic Federation (after 1936)
- Spouse: Pearl Gold Spivak (m. 1922)
- Education: University of Georgia (B.S.); Harvard Law School (LL.B.)
- Occupation: Lawyer, politician, judge

Military service
- Allegiance: United States
- Branch/service: United States Army
- Years of service: 1918
- Rank: 2nd Lieutenant
- Battles/wars: World War I

Matthew Malitz Levy (March 1, 1899 – September 4, 1971) was a Polish-born Jewish American lawyer, politician and judge who served as a justice of the New York Supreme Court from 1951 until his death in 1971. He previously served as a special assistant attorney general in 1927 and 1937, then was appointed a judge of the New York City Municipal Court by mayor Fiorello La Guardia, serving in 1938.

== Biography ==
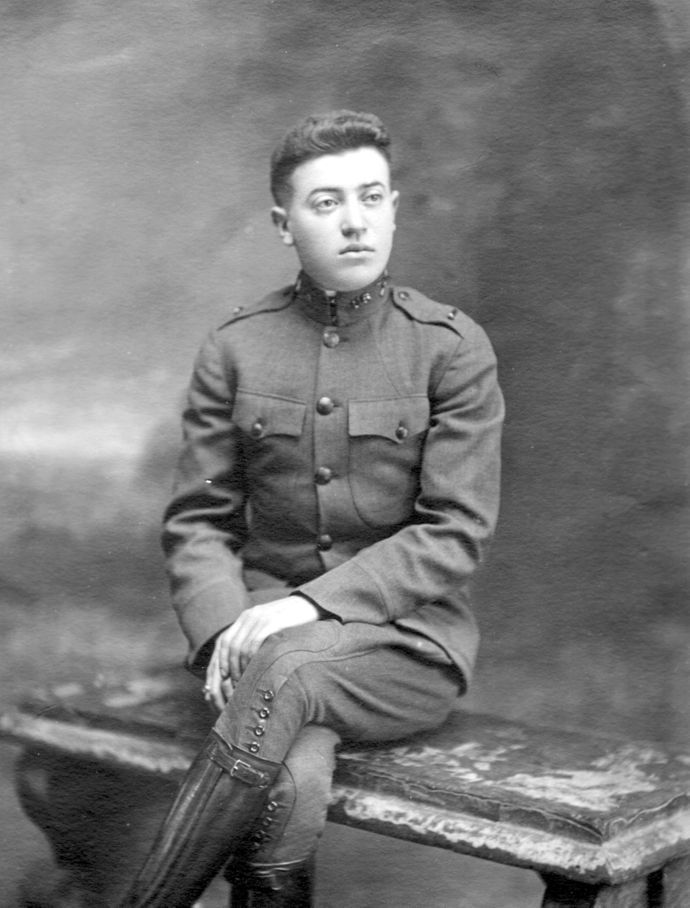
2nd Lieutenant Matthew M. Levy in uniform c. 1918

Matthew Malitz Levy was born on March 1, 1899, in Brest-Litovsk, Congress Poland, the fourth of eight children. He emigrated with his family to the United States in 1903, settling in Savannah, Georgia. He first became interested in the law as a youth, skipping school to go to the courthouse and watch Confederate veteran and judge Peter Meldrim. After graduating high school, he enrolled in the University of Georgia, but paused his studies to enlist in the U.S. Army during World War I. Upon returning home, he earned degrees from Georgia in 1919 and Harvard Law School in 1922 before moving to New York City, where he met his wife Pearl Gold Spivak.

Levy settled in the Bronx, where he worked as a labor lawyer and became law partners with former Socialist judge Jacob Panken. Levy himself had been politically active since his time at Harvard, where he was a member of the university's Liberal Union. He campaigned for Progressive Senator Robert M. La Follette in the 1924 presidential election, then for Socialist Norman Thomas in the 1928 and 1932 presidential elections.

Levy entered electoral politics as a Socialist, running unsuccessfully for State Supreme Court in 1934. He left the party to join the Social Democratic Federation and the American Labor Party in 1936, standing as the ALP candidate for New York City Municipal Court in 1938, Bronx Borough President in 1941, and Supreme Court in 1943. He was finally elected to the Supreme Court in 1950, running on a joint Liberal-Democratic ticket. He was re-elected in 1964, serving until his death in 1971, just months before he was set to retire.

During his judicial career, Levy became known for writing lengthy opinions that were rarely overturned by higher courts. In 1958, the Harvard Law Record named him "Scholar on the Bench."
