= William R. Chapin =

William R. Chapin (born June 7, 1948 in Detroit, Michigan, United States) is the American grandson of Roy D. Chapin, a founder of the Hudson Motor Car Company, and the son of Roy D. Chapin Jr., the former chairman and CEO of the American Motors Corporation. He is currently president of the Automotive Hall of Fame in Dearborn, Michigan.

== Education ==
He received his Business Administration bachelor's degree at Babson College in 1972.

== Career ==
Involved with the automotive industry his whole life, Chapin spent 14 years with American Motors in various sales, marketing and product planning positions. For two years, he was on special assignment in France helping develop a strategic product plan for Renault and AMC in North America and launching the Jeep Cherokee in Europe.

Named international marketing director for AMC in 1984, he was responsible for all Jeep marketing outside the U.S. and the launch of Jeep in Beijing, China.

In 1987, he left AMC to establish Chapin & Co., an automotive marketing services company whose clients included ASC, CART/IndyCar, Ford Special Vehicles Team, ITT Automotive and Volvo Cars. In addition, from 1991 to 1995, he held an equity position in a Dearborn, Michigan motorsports communications firm that was responsible for all Ford worldwide motorsports marketing communications.

In 1999, Chapin restructured his company to devote more time to the launch of the MotorCities National Heritage Area, an affiliate of the National Park Service dedicated to preserving, interpreting and promoting the automotive heritage of Michigan.

After serving on the board of directors for the Automotive Hall of Fame for nearly five years, he was appointed its president in July 2010.
