= Peter Meldrim =

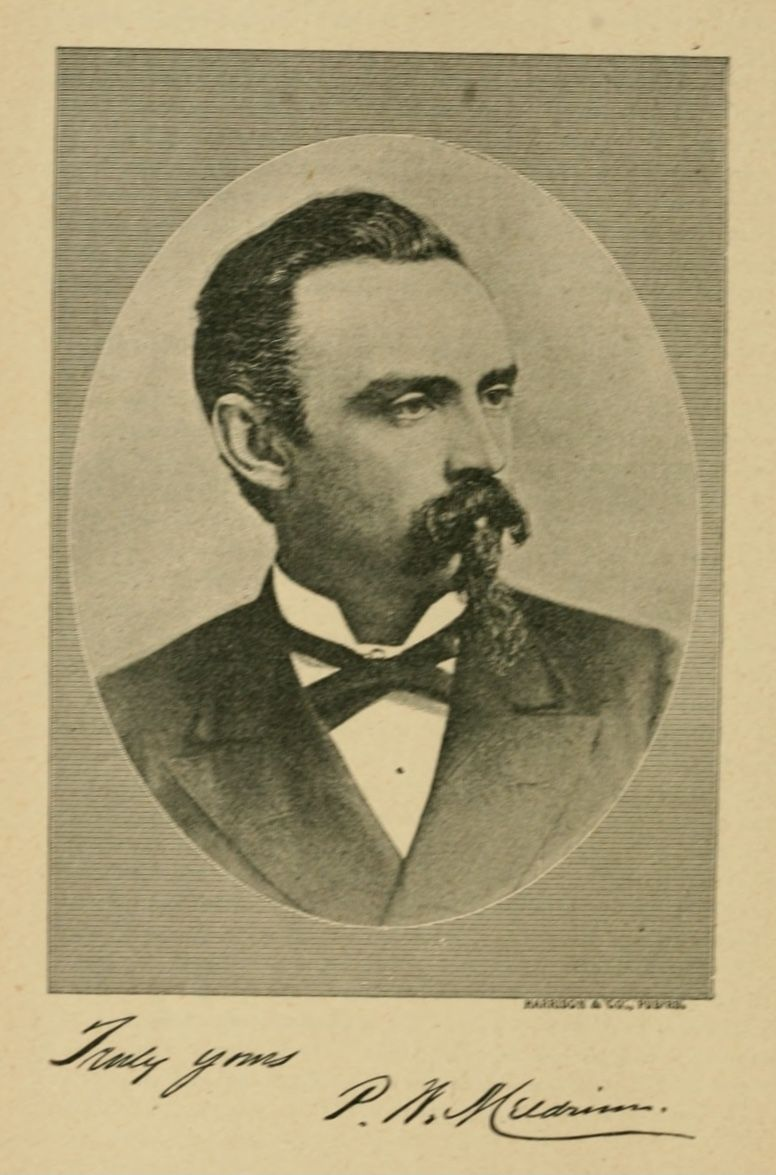
Meldrim c. 1882

Peter Wiltberger Meldrim (December 4, 1848 − December 13, 1933) was an attorney, politician, judge and an army officer from Georgia, United States. Early in his career, he worked to expand African Americans' access to education as chairman of the Georgia State Commission on the Education of Colored Persons. He served as an alderman and was elected Mayor of Savannah, Georgia in the late 1890s.

In 1908, he was the chairman of the Georgia delegation to the Democratic National Convention. Meldrim was a highly regarded attorney known for his handling of complex cases and oratory who served as a commissioner from Georgia on the Uniform Law Commission which worked to enact uniform state laws nationally. Meldrim also presented addresses on law to various state and national bar associations, served as president of the Georgia State Bar in 1904, and became chairman of the American Bar Association Committee on Jurisprudence and Law Reform. In addition, he also served as the Association's president. His home for many years in later life was the Green-Meldrim House, a U.S. National Historic Landmark.

== Early life ==
He was born in Savannah, Georgia, on December 4, 1848; his parents were Ralph M. Meldrim and Jane Fawcett Meldrim. He had Irish heritage and was president of the local Hibernian Society from 1887 to 1912.

At age 16, he fought in the defense of Savannah against Sherman's March to the Sea. He was privately tutored, attended Chatham Academy, then attended the University of Georgia, Class of 1868, where he was elected a member of Phi Beta Kappa, Phi Kappa Literary Society, and was a charter member of the Eta chapter of Chi Phi fraternity. He was the Phi Beta Kappa anniversary orator. In 1869, Meldrim obtained an LL.B, then in 1871 earned an M.A., also from the University of Georgia. He awarded an honorary LL.D. from the university in 1913. He married his wife, Frances P. Casey, in 1881.

Meldrim became a colonel of the 1st Georgia Cavalry and later a brigadier general in the Georgia National Guard.

== Political and professional career ==
Meldrim was chairman of the Georgia State Commission on the Education of Colored Persons from its inception in 1891, and worked to expand African Americans' access to education.

=== Georgia State Senate ===
In 1881, General Meldrim was elected to the Georgia State Senate. In 1891, he was elected as an alderman of the city of Savannah, Georgia, and he ran for Mayor of Savannah in 1897, defeating incumbent Herman Myers. Two years later, though, he declined to run for re-election and Myers became mayor again.

In 1908, he was the chairman of the Georgia delegation to the Democratic National Convention held in Denver, Colorado.

=== Legal career ===
Meldrim was a highly regarded attorney, known for his handling of complex cases and oratory. He served as a commissioner from Georgia on the Uniform Law Commission, which works to enact uniform state laws nationally. He presented addresses on law to various state and national bar associations, and he served as president of the Georgia State Bar in 1904,. Meldrim became chairman of the American Bar Association Committee on Jurisprudence and Law Reform, then the Association's president in 1915. From 1917 to 1933, he was a superior court judge with the Savannah-based Eastern Judicial Circuit.

== Death ==
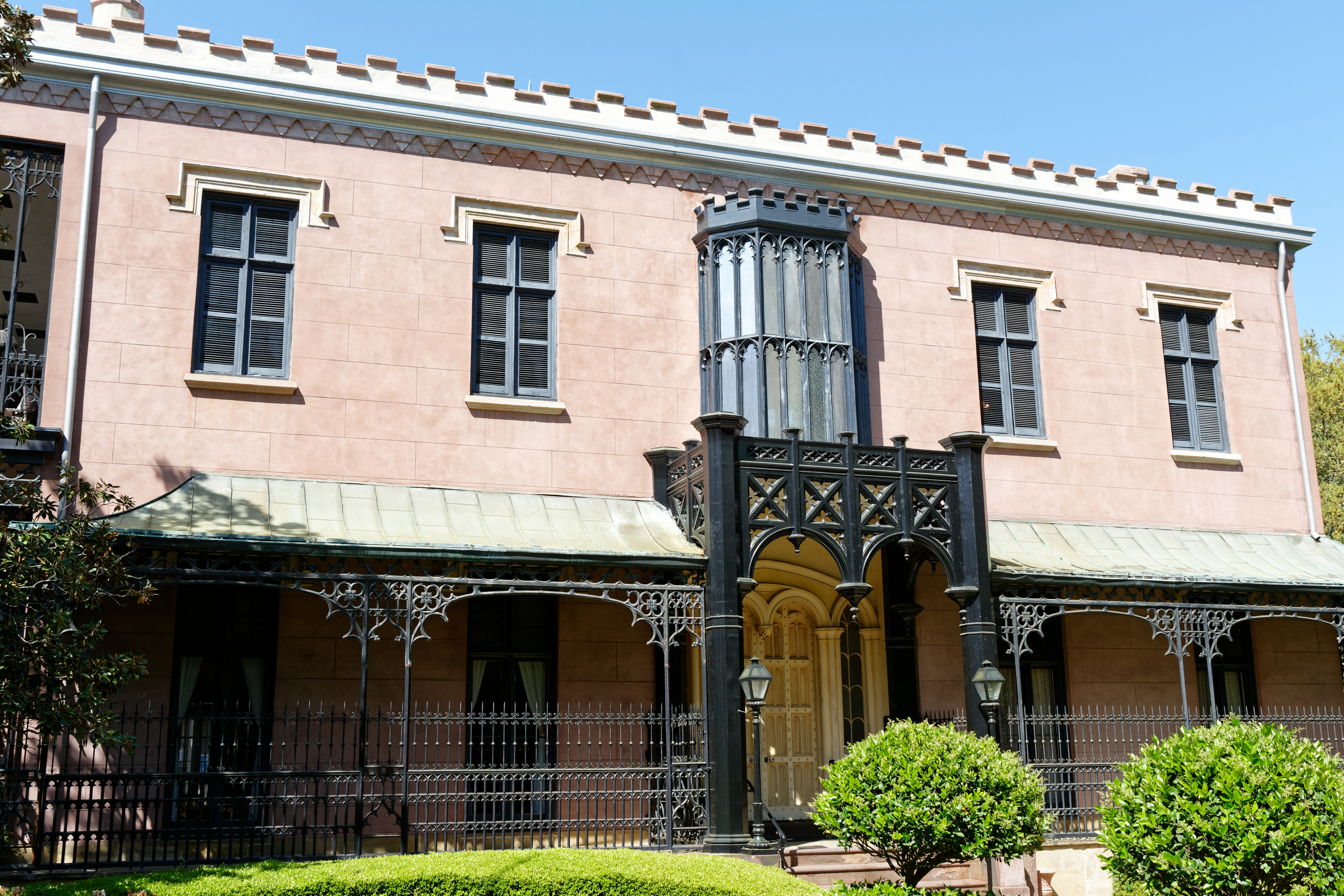
The historic Green-Meldrim House in Savannah, Georgia. Meldrim lived there for many years in later life.

General Meldrim died on December 13, 1933 at his home, the historic Green-Meldrim House, where he had resided since 1892. At the time of his death, he was still a superior court judge, president of the Georgia State Agricultural Society, a member of assorted social and civic clubs including the Capital City Club, and a trustee of the University of Georgia.

Decades later, New York Supreme Court Justice Matthew M. Levy cited Meldrim as the one who first sparked his interest in the law.

== Footnotes ==
Political offices
Preceded by Herman Myers, Democrat	Mayor of Savannah; 1897-1899	Succeeded by Herman Myers, Democrat
