= Roy D. Chapin =

American businessman

Roy Chapin
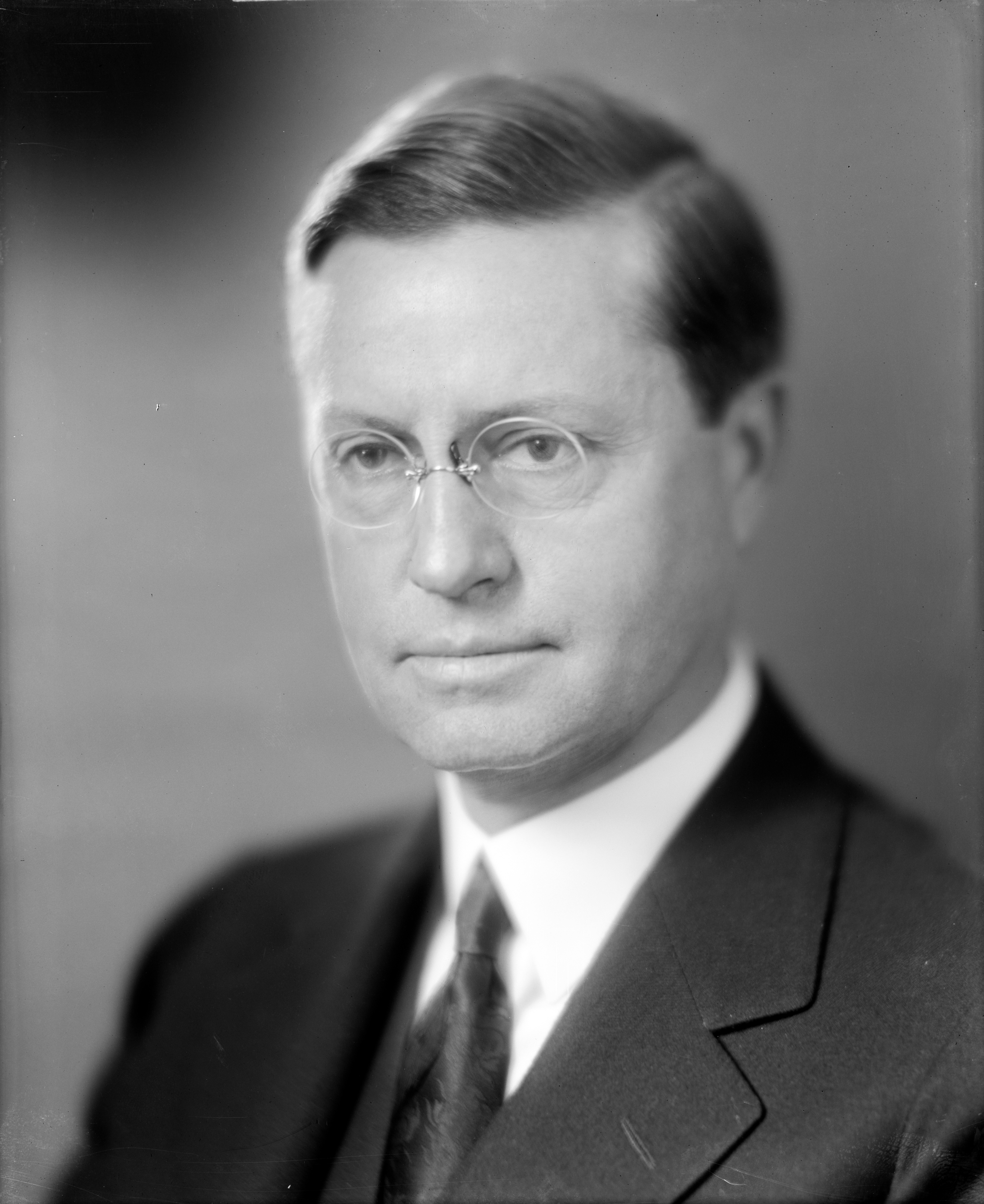

6th United States Secretary of Commerce
- In office December 14, 1932 – March 3, 1933
- President: Herbert Hoover
- Preceded by: Robert P. Lamont
- Succeeded by: Daniel C. Roper
- Acting
- In office August 8, 1932 – December 14, 1932

Personal details
- Born: Robert Dikeman Chapin; February 23, 1880 Lansing, Michigan, U.S.
- Died: February 16, 1936 (aged 55) Detroit, Michigan, U.S.
- Resting place: Woodlawn Cemetery
- Party: Republican
- Spouse: Inez Tiedeman (m. 1914–1936)
- Children: 6, including Roy D. Chapin Jr.
- Education: University of Michigan
- Awards: Automotive Hall of Fame

Roy Dikeman Chapin Sr. (February 23, 1880 – February 16, 1936) was an American industrialist and a co-founder of Hudson Motor Company, the predecessor of American Motors Corporation. He also served as the United States secretary of commerce from August 8, 1932, to March 3, 1933, during the final months of the administration of President Herbert Hoover.

== Early life ==
Chapin was born on February 23, 1880, in Lansing, Michigan, the son of Edward Cornelius Chapin and Ella Rose King. He attended Lansing High School. He enrolled at the University of Michigan, but left in 1901 to take position with Olds Motor Works in Detroit.

In 1914, Chapin married the former Inez Tiedeman, the daughter of George Tiedeman, former mayor of Savannah, Georgia (1907–1913). The couple had six children. One son, Roy D. Chapin Jr., would also pursue a career with Hudson Motor Company and eventually leading American Motors Corporation (AMC).

== Commercial interests ==
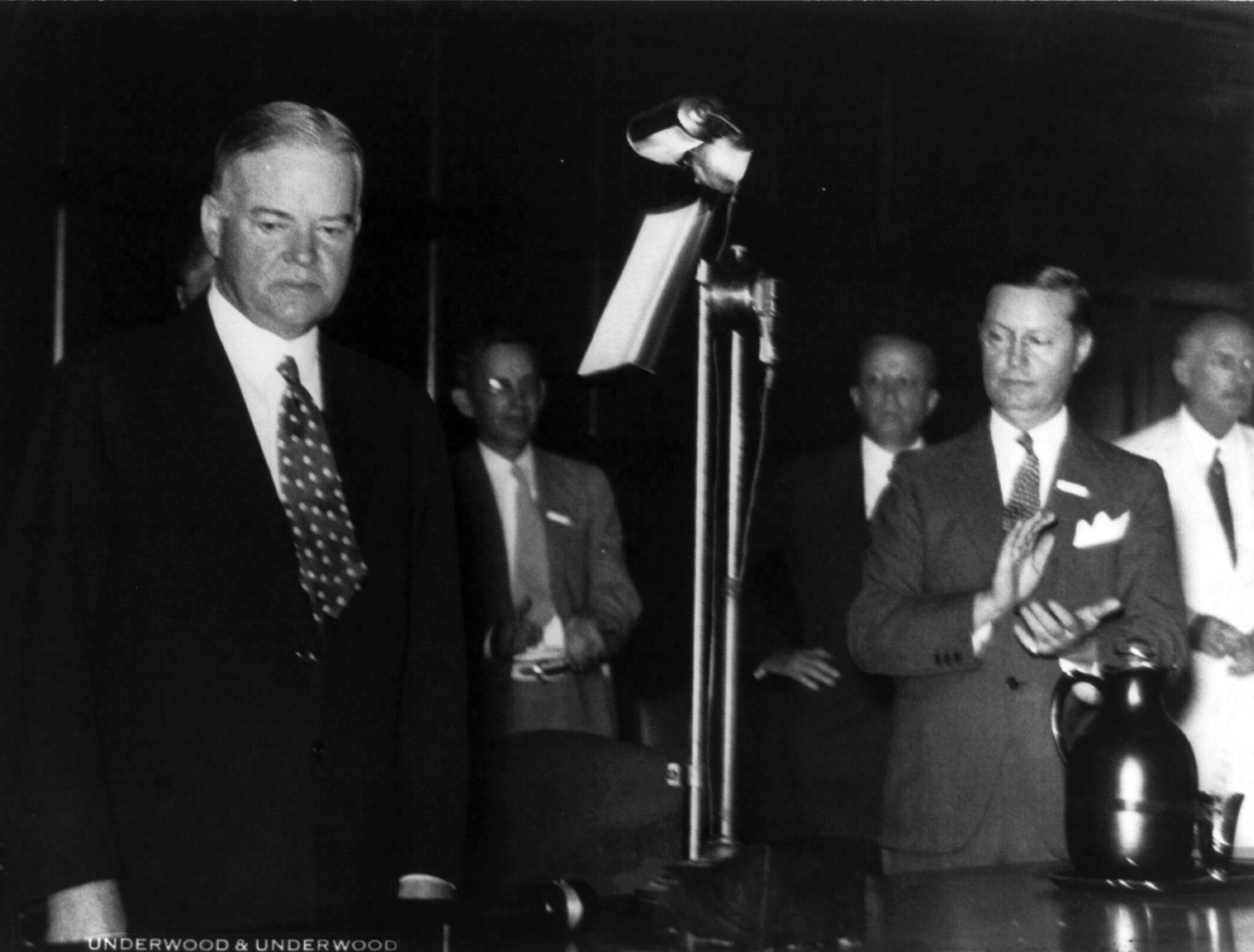
Secretary of Commerce Roy D. Chapin applauds President Herbert Hoover at the Nine-Point Prosperity Conference (August 26, 1932)

Chapin was general sales manager of Olds Motor Works from 1904 to 1906. He then started E. R. Thomas-Detroit Company with Edward R. Thomas, and was its treasurer and general manager from 1906 to 1908.

Chapin headed the consortium of businessmen and engineers that founded the Hudson Motor Car Company in 1908. The company was named for Detroit merchant Joseph L. Hudson, who provided the majority of capital for the operation's start-up.

Chapin was also behind the 1918 formation of the Essex Motors Company, a subsidiary of Hudson. Essex is notable for developing the first affordable mass-produced enclosed automobile in 1922. Because of the success of the inexpensive enclosed Essex Coach line, the American automobile industry shifted away from open touring cars in order to meet consumer demand for all-weather passenger vehicles. By 1929 Hudson-Essex reached 3rd in industry sales behind Chevrolet and Ford.

In 1927 he replaced Clifton as the head of the National Automobile Chamber of Commerce.

In addition to his corporate interests, Chapin spearheaded the drive to build the Lincoln Highway, along with Henry B. Joy of Packard Motors. While Chapin viewed a system of professionally designed and built roadways as the greatest way to grow the automobile industry, he also saw the modern roadways movement as a way to secure long-range strength for the United States as a nation.

== Political activities ==
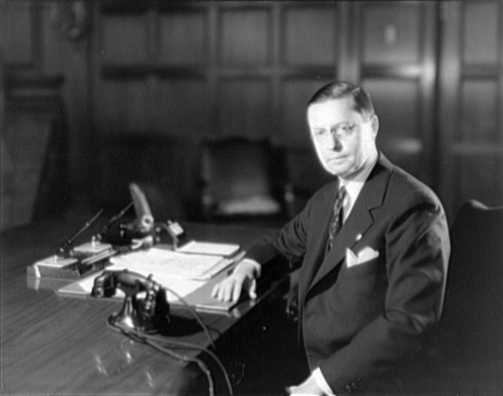
Chapin at his desk as secretary of commerce, 1932

After building Hudson into one of the most profitable independent American automobile manufacturers, Chapin left Hudson for the Hoover administration upon his appointment in 1932.

During his tenure as secretary of commerce, Chapin was unsuccessful in persuading Henry Ford to provide financial help to avoid the collapse of the Union Guardian Trust Company of Detroit. Ford's refusal to aid the bank in averting a financial failure led to the Michigan Bank Holiday, an event that began a series of state bank holidays and ultimately to the passage of Roosevelt administration's Emergency Banking Act of 1933.

== Death ==
Chapin returned to Hudson in March 1933. His final three years were spent trying to save the company from the effects of the Great Depression. He died in Detroit, Michigan, on February 16, 1936. He was succeeded at Hudson by A.E. Barit. He is buried in Woodlawn Cemetery.

== Legacy ==
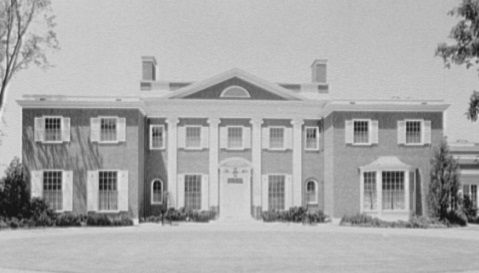
Chapin House in Grosse Pointe Farms, Michigan

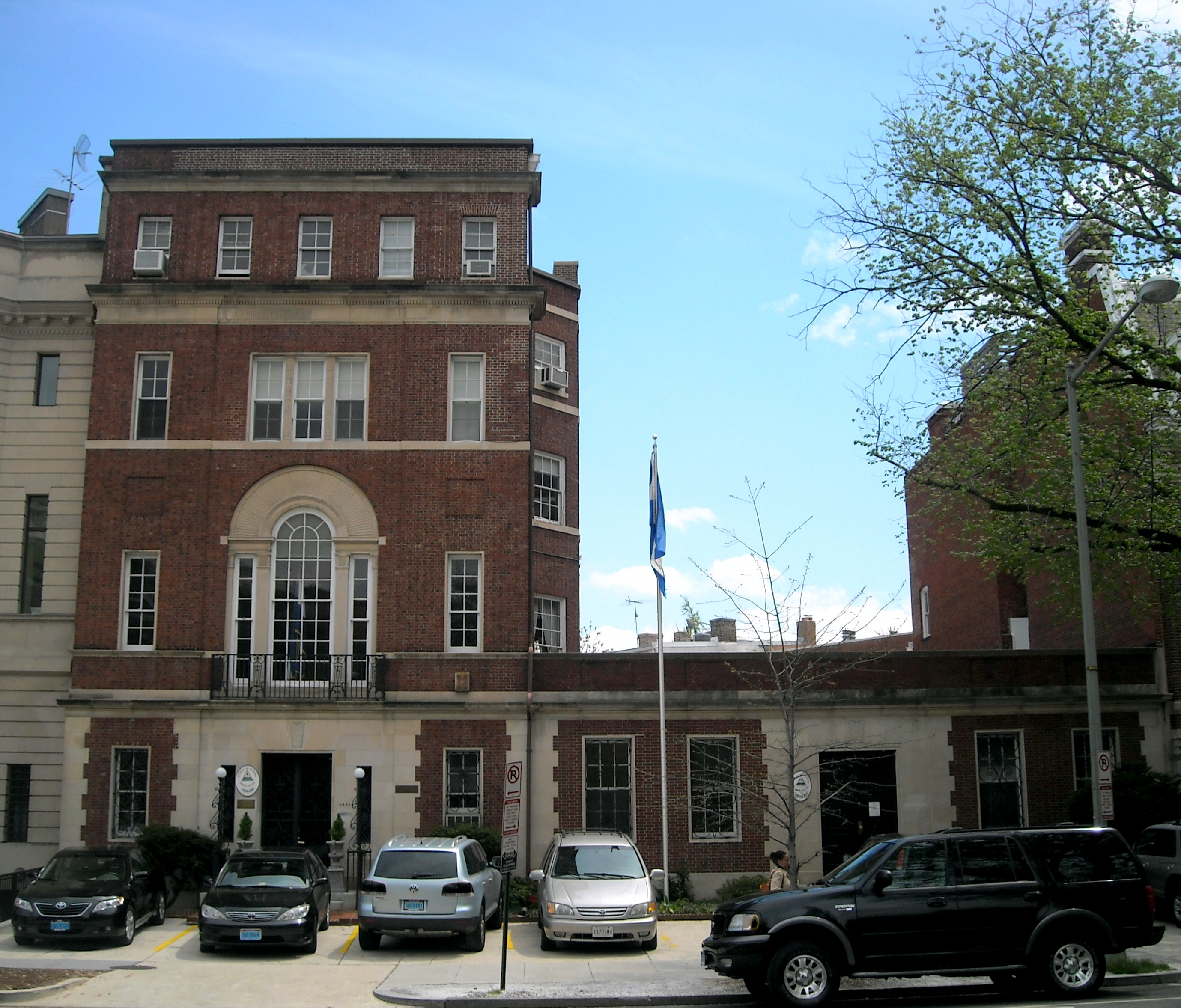
Former residence of Chapin in Washington, D.C., currently the Embassy of Nicaragua

In 1927, Chapin commissioned noted architect John Russell Pope to design a residence for his family at 447 Lake Shore Road in Grosse Pointe Farms, Michigan. Pope later designed the Jefferson Memorial, National Archives Building and National Gallery of Art in Washington, D.C. Bryant Fleming landscaped the grounds which included 600-year-old yews imported from England. Mrs. Chapin occupied the residence until her death in 1956 when Henry Ford II and wife Anne purchased the property. Ford owned the estate until 1983 when he demolished the house and divided the land to construct condominiums.

In 1954, Nash Kelvinator acquired Hudson in a friendly merger. The resulting company, American Motors Corporation (AMC), continued operation until Chrysler acquired it in 1987. Chapin's son, Roy D. Chapin Jr., served as chairman and chief executive officer of AMC and led the automaker to the acquisition of Kaiser Jeep Corporation in 1970. Chapin was inducted into the Automotive Hall of Fame in 1972. His grandson, William R. Chapin, was named president of the Automotive Hall of Fame in 2010.

Political offices
Preceded by Robert P. Lamont	United States Secretary of Commerce; 1932–1933	Succeeded by Daniel C. Roper
