= Robert B. Evans =

American businessman (1906–1998)

- Born: March 29, 1906; Richmond, Virginia
- Died: August 17, 1998 (aged 92); Grosse Pointe Shores, Michigan
- Education: University of Michigan

Robert Beverley Evans Sr. (19 March 1906 – 17 August 1998) was an automobile industry executive, a prominent Republican, an industrialist, a socialite, and an avid sportsperson. He founded Evans Industries. Evans also became chairman of American Motors Corporation (AMC).

== Career ==
Evans was born in Richmond, Virginia, and graduated from the Virginia Episcopal School, The University of Lauzon, and the University of Michigan.

As an entrepreneur, Evans became the owner of many companies with combined annual sales of US$20 million by the 1960s, but entrusted most business affairs to underlings. Instead, Evans focused on hobbies like golf, quail hunting, and designing and racing a hydroplane. He built a jet-powered hydroplane in 1960 intending to capture the world's water speed record that was held by Donald Campbell. He was determined to succeed even when his boat, "Miss Stars and Stripes II," crashed during a speed attempt.

The Evans Products Company grew into a supplier of automotive transportation systems and building materials. In 1955, Evans Products spun off several small companies to Robert B. Evans Jr., the founder's executive vice president and son. The resulting companies became managed as a private equity firm, Evans Industries.

Evans described himself in a New York Times interview as a relaxed Detroit millionaire who has spent 35 years specializing in the reconstruction of "sick companies."

== American Motors ==
Investors received AMC's annual report that reported significant losses in a plain brown envelope, and Evans was called by Donald MacDonald, "a little-known Detroit healer of sick companies." Over a few weeks during January 1966, the sixty-year-old Evans bought 200,000 shares of AMC common stock (worth almost US$2 million or about $19,846,154 in 2025 dollars). He became the firm's largest shareholder, with ownership of about 1% of the company.

Evans had no automobile industry experience, but "he had a reputation for success and for getting things done." On 7 March 1966, Evans got himself elected to AMC's board of directors and "immediately criticized the company's auto line as being too conservative." As sales of automobiles were weak industry-wide during 1966. AMC was facing significant losses. Evans was elected board chairman by AMC's directors on 6 June 1966. He replaced Richard E. Cross, who continued as a director and chairman of the executive committee.

As AMC's newly appointed board chairman, Evans immediately promised "a different philosophy and approach" in the automaker's affairs. Unlike the then existing management at AMC, Evans freely criticized the leadership under George W. Romney "for failing to adjust to a changing market" and started to "shake things up in Kenosha" as solutions to the automaker's problems.

Evans is credited with turning the company around from the strategy of matching the Big Three American automakers (General Motors, Ford, and Chrysler) nearly model for model that was promoted by Roy Abernethy. American Motors struggled during 1966, a year considered "the biggest auto boom in history," and was counting on its redesigned 1967 models; however, Evans admitted one month before their introduction that "we are still very much in a questionable period."

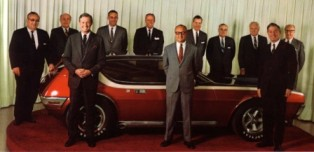
1968 AMC Board of Directors around an AMX-GT with Evans in the back row, fourth from the left

Evans made major changes by handpicking Roy D. Chapin Jr. as AMC's general manager. Evans always encouraged the styling and engineering staff to do things differently - to try new ideas and find new ways to design and build cars. Evans even dropped hints that the automaker may try to compete with Volkswagen in the small-car field and stated that "We have to give the public cars that go beyond what the 'big three' gives them." In addition to stating that AMC's standard line of cars need to be as good or better than those offered by the bigger automakers, Evans emphasized developing "Personality cars" to attract and excite market segments, particularly the youth.

Evans is credited as the champion for AMC to build production versions of the concept cars that made up the "Project IV" showings designed to stimulate public interest in the automaker. Evans was particularly fond of the two-seat Vignale AMX show car that was smaller than the Ford Mustang and more like a Chevrolet Corvette rival, promoting for its production to all that he could. This was at a time when the automaker experienced falling earnings and had to skip the dividend payments to its shareholders for the fourth consecutive quarter.

Evans saw opportunities for sporty AMC cars in the rapidly growing more youthful consumer market segments, as well as to shed its "economy-car image." The original idea of a two-passenger-only, high-performance sports car project came to life with Evans in the fall of 1966. He stated that AMC is proceeding "cautiously in a hurry." For example, the automaker was deliberating whether to build the AMX in fiberglass or steel; with metal taking longer to tool, but volume would be higher.

On 9 January 1967, a contentious AMC board of directors meeting resulted in the firing or "early retirement" of Abernethy, as well as the "resignation" of Evans as chairman of the board. The two were replaced by William V. Luneburg as president and Roy D. Chapin Jr. as the new chairman of the board. Evans continued as a board member.

== Retirement ==
During May 1970, Evans sold half of his holdings in AMC (100,000 shares). Evans sold 44,000 of his AMC shares in 1971 while continuing to serve as a director and member of the finance committee.

In 1971, Evans purchased the Muskegon Bank and Trust Company in Muskegon, Michigan from the so-called "Parsons Group."

He died at his residence in Grosse Pointe Shores, Michigan. His two children survived him, Jane Evans Jones and Robert B. Evans Jr.

Business positions
Preceded by Richard E. Cross	American Motors Board of Directors Chairman; 1966 – 1967	Succeeded by Roy D. Chapin Jr.
