= Roy D. Chapin Jr. =

Chairman and chief executive officer of AMC (American Motors Corporation)

- Born: September 21, 1915; Grosse Pointe, Michigan
- Died: August 5, 2001 (aged 85); Nantucket, Massachusetts
- Education: Hotchkiss School (1933); Yale University (B.A. 1937)
- Occupation: Automobile industry executive
- Employers: Hudson Motor Car Company; American Motors Corporation
- Parent: Roy D. Chapin (Hudson Motor Car Company cofounder)
- Awards: Automotive Hall of Fame

Signature
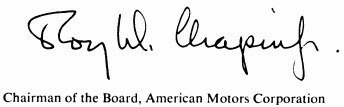

Roy Dikeman Chapin Jr. (September 21, 1915 – August 5, 2001) was the chairman and chief executive officer of American Motors Corporation (AMC). Chapin's father, Roy D. Chapin Sr., was one of the co-founders of the Hudson Motor Car Company; Hudson later merged with Nash-Kelvinator Corporation in 1954 to form American Motors. Roy D. Chapin Jr. was instrumental in introducing many successful lines of cars by American Motors that included the Gremlin, Hornet, and Javelin, as well as the purchase of Kaiser Jeep by the automaker.

== Early life ==
Roy D. Chapin Jr. graduated from the Los Alamos Ranch School in Los Alamos, New Mexico, the Hotchkiss School in Lakeville, Connecticut in 1933, and received his degree in Business Administration with honors from Yale University in 1937. At Yale, he was advertising manager of campus humor magazine The Yale Record (Walter J. Cummings Jr. and James S. Copley served with him on the business staff). He began his automotive career as salesman, test driver, and experimental engineer for Hudson in 1938.

== Career ==
Chapin joined American Motors in 1954 when the corporation was formed with the merger of Nash and Hudson. Later, he served as an assistant treasurer and a director at AMC. By 1964, he held the post of executive vice president in charge of international operations of AMC. Robert B. Evans, chairman of AMC, recognized the talents of Chapin and promoted him from an executive vice president to take his place as chairman of the board. The move was to increase the firm's operational efficiency at the start of a difficult time.

The "dynamic and intelligent" Chapin was appointed to fill the CEO position at AMC following the departure of Roy Abernethy in 1967, along with William V. Luneburg as president. Chapin realized he was taking over at a crucial time; The Wall Street Journal described it as "a dying company." At the time, Chapin said, "We're going to have to show ingenuity." He reflected later that the most difficult period was "... when our president, Bill Luneburg, and I took over. We were out of money and we had to do something to overcome the immediate problems. We had no time to think about long-range problems. Obviously, we managed to solve immediate considerations..."

At the time Chapin took control of the company, AMC's share of U.S. auto sales slipped, from 6.4% in 1960 to a mere 3.2 percent. On top of the loss of US$12.6 million in fiscal 1966, Chapin and new president William V. Luneburg had more bad news for the annual meeting of shareholders by reporting a 10% sales drop from a year earlier (to $257 million) and the company lost another $8,459,917 (US$83,948,407 in 2025 dollars) in the first quarter of its 1967 fiscal year. The company skipped paying a dividend for the sixth straight quarter, and to control the inventory of unsold cars, AMC closed its factories for ten working days—the second such shutdown in two months. For the entire year AMC "lost an astounding $75.8 million". During an era when relationships were vital to securing corporate financing, Chapin "was a well-known industrialist who inspired great confidence among the leading financiers of his day" to help keep the automaker going.

In just a few weeks in his new post at AMC, Chapin decided to focus on the smallest (and at that time, the least popular) AMC model—the compact Rambler American. His objective was to double Rambler sales to 140,000 cars in 1967 and recapture at least 10% of the compact market that AMC once dominated. He saw a gap between U.S. cars and the inexpensive imports (primarily the Volkswagen Beetle) and positioned the Rambler right into the center of this gap with a new, low price tag to make its total value superior to the imports, as well as superior in both price and range of choice to U.S. compacts. He instituted many changes that lowered production costs and provided the car buyers with more value. Chapin cut the suggested retail price of the basic two-door Rambler American sedan to $1,839 (US$17,757 in 2025 dollars), which was $278 less than its closest U.S. competitor, the $2,117 Plymouth Valiant. This move made the considerably larger and more powerful American only $200 more than the rudimentary Volkswagen. By forgoing the annual styling changeovers that were expected among the domestic firms, AMC could save retooling costs and keep the car's price so low. Helping AMC was the strategic decisions by the competing automakers not to match the price drop.

Within a month of taking their positions, Chapin and Luneburg reversed the automaker's upholding the ban on racing that was instituted by the Automobile Manufacturers Association (AMA) in 1957. American Motors began race car sponsorship and focused on developing new muscle cars models for consumers looking for performance.

In addition to slashing prices and sponsoring Ramblers in racing to help build a performance image, Chapin was optimistic because the company had cut costs by $27 million a year, hired new executives, and had significant products in the pipeline, including new youth-oriented models. Chapin appeared in print advertisements and he was interviewed by John Bond, publisher of Road & Track and Car Life about product and corporate strategy to assure the success of AMC. Chapin continued making changes for the 1968 model year and also took the bold step to make air conditioning standard on all the Ambassador models at a time when this comfort feature was still an option on the expensive Cadillac and Lincoln brand luxury vehicles. After the disastrous 1967 results, the company's retail sales increased 13% during fiscal-year 1968.

Other changes during 1968 included developing new marketing campaigns with Guy Hadsall Jr. reporting directly to Chapin. These included dropping the roadshows for the introduction of new models in favor of closed-circuit TV, as well as "dynamic meetings" by holding the first automobile sales events in the sky using chartered flights to "mystery" destinations. The automaker's new advertising agency Wells, Rich, and Greene that was headed by Mary Wells Lawrence was also "innovative and daring in its approach." Print and TV advertisements broke with the traditional convention of not attacking the competition, with AMC cars appearing side by side with competing makes. The launch of the two-seat AMC AMX sports car was through a marketing agreement with Playboy.

The 1970 AMC Hornet was launched under Chapin's leadership as a value compact to compete against the "import tide". Chapin worked with Ivan Vassall Sr., who in 1969 established the first black-owned auto dealership in Philadelphia.

Chapin was a promoter of innovation at AMC. In 1967, he announced a joint venture with Gulton Industries for the development of an electric automobile. A three-passenger commuter, the Amitron was an experimental design shown to the public.

While at the head of AMC, Chapin spearheaded the acquisition of Jeep from the Kaiser Motors Division of Kaiser Industries in 1970. According to Chapin: "Perhaps the easiest decision I ever made was the purchase of Jeep from Kaiser in 1970. I tried to buy it when George Romney (later Michigan governor) and Roy Abernethy were running AMC. Romney and Edgar Kaiser couldn't get along. I was running the international operations under Abernethy and I was following Jeep around. When they put up a plant, I followed with a Rambler plant because it worked like a charm. Where Jeep was, there were roads and gasoline. Abernethy didn't go for the idea and the first thing I did when I became chairman and got a little money was to buy Jeep. We got it for a song, about $75 million..." American Motors' engineers and designers quickly overhauled Jeep and expanded its lineup, creating a valuable asset that attracted Renault, Chrysler, and ultimately DaimlerBenz AG.

Chapin was also interested in the Wankel engine and stated "that the rotary engine will play an important role as a powerplant for cars and trucks of the future." An agreement was signed with Curtiss-Wright in February 1973, for AMC to build Wankels for both passenger cars and Jeeps, as well as the right to sell any rotary engines it produces to other companies. American Motors designed the unique AMC Pacer around the engine, but the production cars used AMC's conventional piston engines.

Chapin established a "philosophy of difference" although vaguely defined, "it has meant that AMC sought niches in the auto market where the Big Three were unwilling or unable to move quickly." In 1977, on the 75th anniversary of the "birth" of two organizations, American Motors and Popular Mechanics, Chapin described AMC's "corporate philosophy of difference, under which we strive to offer the American motoring public a wider choice" and stated that "the most significant change we can look to will be the development of alternate sources of power to replace our dependence on fossil fuels."

Chapin was also instrumental in developing collaboration between American Motors and Renault. He was also in favor of Renault investing in AMC, but was distressed by the company's sale to Chrysler.

== Retirement ==
Chapin gave up the CEO title in late 1977, but stayed as chairman until he retired, in October 1978, to his ranch in California. He summed up his career in an interview given upon his retirement: "I love the business and never really considered doing anything else." He remained on AMC's board of directors until 1987, when Chrysler acquired the company.

Chapin served on the board of directors of other companies, including Whirlpool Corporation, American Natural Resources (an energy company engaged in natural gas transmission and storage), Coastal Corporation, and Gould Corporation. He was an avid outdoor enthusiast and his hobbies included hunting, fishing, and ranching, as well as book collecting. He was also involved in the area of conservation and served on the boards of organizations that included the Atlantic Salmon Federation, Ducks Unlimited, and Trout Unlimited.

Roy Chapin died of heart failure on Nantucket Island, off the coast of Massachusetts, at the age of 85. His son, William R. Chapin, was named president of the Automotive Hall of Fame in 2010.

== Legacy ==
Be ready when opportunity comes. Luck is the time when preparation and opportunity meet.

— Roy D. Chapin Jr.

Chapin was inducted into the Automotive Hall of Fame in 1984.

Although much smaller than the domestic "Big Three" automakers (General Motors, Ford, and Chrysler), AMC prospered during the early years when Chapin was in charge, as sales of its compact cars benefited from rising energy prices and the company's international expanded.

Chapin was also known for his persuasion powers with the automaker's investment banks and his Wall Street contacts; winning concessions on many occasions that helped AMC remain afloat. His efforts to integrate Jeep into AMC contributed to the popularity, from the early 1970s onward, of the sports utility vehicle (SUV) market. The ownership of the Jeep brand was crucial to the company's survival until 1987 and Chapin's "legacy was what kept American Motors together instead of being sold off as factories and other pieces" according to Robert Casey, transportation curator at the Henry Ford Museum.

To summarize his life, Chapin was considered a true 'gentleman' who grew up in the auto industry and was knowledgeable, warm, and accessible; in short, a patrician with a common touch.

== Notes ==
- Fracassa, Hawke. "Roy D. Chapin Jr., ex-AMC chairman gambled to save Jeep". The Detroit News, August 7, 2001.
- Higgins, James V., "Roy Chapin Jr. mastered how to survive in auto industry". The Detroit News, August 12, 2001.
- The Bentley Historical Library at the University of Michigan has a collection of Chapin's personal correspondence, speeches, papers relating to international business operations of AMC and its divisions, and photographs. Roy D. Chapin, Jr., Papers: 1928-2001. 23.3 linear ft.

Business positions
Preceded by Roy Abernethy	Chairman and CEO of American Motors; 1967–1977	Succeeded by Gerald C. Meyers
