= AMC Rebel =

Cars developed and produced by American Motors Corporation

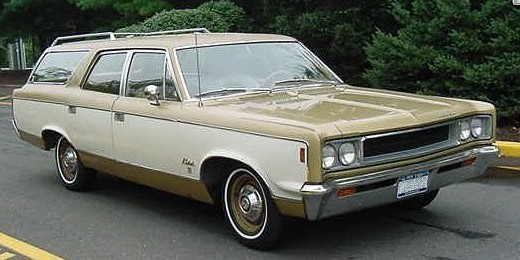
- 1968 AMC Rebel 770 station wagon

Overview
- Manufacturer: American Motors Corporation (AMC)
- Also called: Rambler Rebel (Australia, New Zealand, Costa Rica, United Kingdom); Rambler Classic (Mexico); Renault Rambler (Europe)
- Production: 1967–1970 (US market)
- Model years: 1967–1970 (US market)
- Assembly: United States: Kenosha, Wisconsin (Kenosha Engine); Australia: Port Melbourne (AMI); Belgium: Haren (RIB); Canada: Brampton, Ontario; Costa Rica: San José (Purdy Motors); Mexico: Mexico City (VAM); New Zealand: Thames (CMI); Peru: Lima (I.A.P.S.A)

Body and chassis
- Class: Mid-size
- Body style: 2-door sedan (1967); 2-door convertible (1967 & 1968); 2-door hardtop; 4-door sedan; 4-door station wagon
- Layout: FR layout
- Platform: AMC's "senior cars"
- Related: AMC Ambassador

Powertrain
- Engine: 232 cu in (3.8 L) I6 145 or 155 hp (116 kW; 157 PS); 252 cu in (4.1 L) I6 170 hp (127 kW; 172 PS) (Mexico); 290 cu in (4.8 L) V8 220 hp (164 kW; 223 PS) (1967–1969); 304 cu in (5.0 L) V8 210 hp (157 kW; 213 PS) (1970 only); 343 cu in (5.6 L) V8 235 or 280 hp (209 kW; 284 PS) (1967–1969); 360 cu in (5.9 L) V8 245 or 290 hp (216 kW; 294 PS) (1970 only); 390 cu in (6.4 L) V8 315 or 325 hp (242 kW; 330 PS) (1969 and 1970); 390 cu in (6.4 L) V8 340 hp (254 kW; 345 PS) (The Machine)
- Transmission: 3-speed manual; 3-speed with overdrive; 4-speed manual floor or console; 3-speed automatic on column; 3-speed "Shift-Command" on console

Dimensions
- Wheelbase: 114 in (2,896 mm)
- Length: 197 in (5,004 mm); 199 in (5,055 mm) (1970 two- and four-door)
- Width: 77.29 in (1,963 mm)
- Height: 53.5 in (1,359 mm)
- Curb weight: 3,500 lb (1,588 kg) approx.

Chronology
- Predecessor: Rambler Classic
- Successor: AMC Matador

The AMC Rebel (known as the Rambler Rebel in 1967) is a midsized car produced by American Motors Corporation (AMC) from the 1967 until the 1970 model year. It replaced the Rambler Classic. A similar AMC Matador line replaced the Rebel models, starting with the 1971 model year.

The Rebel was positioned as the high-volume seller in the independent automaker's line of models. The Rebel was also available in several specialty models, including station wagons featuring themed trim and luxury equipment offered only in selected geographical regions. A high-performance, low-priced muscle car version was produced in 1970, the Machine, which is most recognized in its flamboyant white, red, and blue trim.

The Rebel is the shorter-wheelbase, intermediate-sized version of the longer-wheelbase, full-sized Ambassador line.

The Rebel was built at AMC's West Assembly Line (along with the Ambassador) in Kenosha, Wisconsin, and in Brampton, Ontario, Canada (Bramalea – Brampton Assembly Plant).

The Rebel was also assembled from Complete Knock-down (CKD) kits under license in Europe (by Renault in 1967), in Mexico (by Vehiculos Automotores Mexicanos), in Costa Rica by Purdy Motor; and from Semi Knockdown kits (SKD) in Australia (by Australian Motor Industries), and in New Zealand (by Campbell Motor Industries). Although the Rambler name was discontinued on the Rebel in the U.S. and Canadian markets after the 1967 model year, the cars continued to be sold in international markets under the historic "Rambler" brand.

== Background ==
The "Rebel" name was introduced by AMC in 1957 as a special model with a big V8 engine: the Rambler Rebel, the first factory-produced lightweight muscle car, and the first hint that muscle cars would be part of the company's future.

The Rebel name reappeared for the 1966 model year on the top-of-the-line version of the Rambler Classic two-door hardtop. It featured bucket seats, special trim, and a revised roofline. For the 1967 model year, AMC's entire intermediate line took the Rebel name.

Based on the Ambassador platform, the new Rebel models were designed under the leadership of Roy Abernethy. However, the automaker changed management in January 1967 with the appointment of a new chairman and CEO, Roy D. Chapin Jr., whose objective was to change AMC's "frumpy" image. The redesigned intermediate line began to be promoted with a focus on performance and advertising describing them as one of the "now cars." There were also numerous factory and dealer installed high-output options.

During its production, the Rebel was available as a six-passenger, four-door sedan, two-door hardtop, and four-door station wagon with an optional third-row seat for two more passengers. In addition, a two-door sedan (coupé) with a thin B-pillar and flip-out rear side windows was available for only the 1967 model year, while a convertible was offered during 1967 and 1968.

The six-cylinder engines that were introduced by AMC in 1964 were continued. However, the 1967 Rebel models introduced the first of a family of all-new V8s that replaced AMC's long-lived "Gen-1" designs in the mid-sized automobile market segment. These included the 290 cu in (4.8 L) and 343 cu in (5.6 L) engines that debuted in the 1966 Rambler American. With a four-barrel carburetor and dual exhaust, the 343 V8 produced 280 hp (209 kW; 284 PS) at 4800 rpm and 365 pound force-feet (495 N⋅m) of torque at 3000 rpm. The new Rebels also eliminated the torque tube design used in the Rambler Classic in favor of an open drive shaft with a four-link, trailing-arm rear live axle rear suspension system to provide a more comfortable coil spring ride. The independent front suspension continued to use AMC's unequal-length control arms and high-mount coil springs.

=== 1967 ===
The 1967 Rambler Rebel was a completely new design from its predecessor, the Rambler Classic. Now a larger car riding on a two-inch (50-mm) longer 114-inch (2,896 mm) wheelbase, the width was also increased by nearly 4 inches (102 mm) to enlarge interior passenger space and cargo capacity. The Rebel had as much interior space as full-sized cars from Ford and GM. The new body design was in sharp contrast to its predecessor's "straight-edge" design. The Rebel featured a smooth, rounded appearance with sweeping rooflines, a "Coke-bottle" body with a shorter rear deck, and a greater glass area for increased visibility. However, the design "themes" such as the "hop-up" fenders became so pervasive across the industry that the all-new 1967 Rebel was criticized because "viewed from any angle, anyone other than an out-and-out car buff would have trouble distinguishing the Rebel from its GM, Ford, and Chrysler Corp. competition." American Motors was staying abreast of the fashion and the Rebel was the first "family car with style that rivaled function." The Rebel's advantage in roominess compared to counterparts from Ford, Chevy, and Plymouth, was that the Rebels now looked like them "making them less distinctive to buyers."

A new safety-oriented instrument panel featured a steering column designed to collapse under impact. The gauges and controls were grouped in a hooded binnacle in front of the driver with the rest of dashboard pushed forward and away from the passengers.

The Rebel models were similar to the senior Ambassador line in that they shared the same basic unit body (platform) aft of the cowl. However, the Rebel's front end had an entirely new design with a "venturi" grille motif in die cast metal, while its rear end featured a simpler appearance with inward-curved taillights. Rebels came in the base 550 and deluxe 770 models, with a high-line SST available only as a two-door hardtop.

The base 550 two-door sedans featured the identical "semi-fastback" roofline as the more expensive pillarless hardtops, but had slim B-pillars. However, these pillars were not a structural component because of the use of the hardtop coupe body design. The convertible featured a new "split stack" folding mechanism design that allowed a full-width backseat with room for three passengers. The four-door sedans continued a traditional notchback form, albeit smoothed from the previously sharp-angled roofline. The Cross Country station wagons featured a standard roof rack, all-vinyl upholstery, and a drop-down tailgate for carrying long loads. A third row rear-facing seat was optional, with a side-hinged tailgate for easier access. The Rebel 770 wagon was available after midyear with 3M's DI-NOC simulated wood-grain body side panels trimmed in a slim, stainless steel frame.

Starting with the 1967 models, American Motors offered the industry's most comprehensive warranty up to that time: two years or 25,000 miles (40,000 km) on the entire automobile and five years or 50,000 miles (80,000 km) on the engine and power train. American Motors continued its industry-exclusive ceramic-coated exhaust system as standard.

To further emphasize the durability and prove the reliability of the new Rebels, an absolute record of 30 hours flat was set in the long-distance Baja run down Mexico's Baja California Peninsula in 1967. A hole in the transmission pan slowed them down, but the endurance racers were able to get the car to a town to get a new one.

Offering traditional Rambler economy with six-cylinder engines and overdrive transmissions, the Rebel could also be turned "into a decent budget-priced muscle car" with the 343 cu in (5.6 L), the largest available engine from AMC in 1967. A road test by Car Life magazine of a Rebel SST hardtop equipped with the 343 V8 and automatic transmission turned in a 0-60 mph (0 to 97 km/h) time of nine seconds and reached a top speed of 110 miles per hour (177 km/h). A road test by Popular Science found similar performance times and noted that their Rebel SST was the quietest-riding of the tested cars, but with the drawback of wind noise. The magazine also praised Rebel's reclining backrests for both front seats that reduce fatigue on long trips while a co-driver can stretch out and relax, as well as AMC's self-tightening seat belts that aid in buckling and comfort. A survey conducted by Popular Mechanics after owners had driven their cars 678,996 miles (1,092,738 km) concluded: "in all, the report indicates that most Rebel owners are delighted with their purchases." Journalist and automobile critic, Tom McCahill, summarized his Mechanix Illustrated road test article, "there isn't a better intermediate size car sold in the United States than the 1967 Rebel".

The completely redesigned 1967 Rebel production was 75% of the previous year's. At the same time, the larger-sized Ambassador sales rose by almost the same amount. The possible reason for the two different outcomes could be the Ambassador's more elegant front-end design with only a $300 difference between the two lines. The highest sales decline was in Rebel four-door sedans, which was offset by increased consumer demand for the Ambassador four-door sedans. Buyers "upgraded" to the Ambassador as they "wanted more car – not less" and "AMC made the mistake" of offering Ambassadors with an I6 engine making them "really snazzy Rebels."

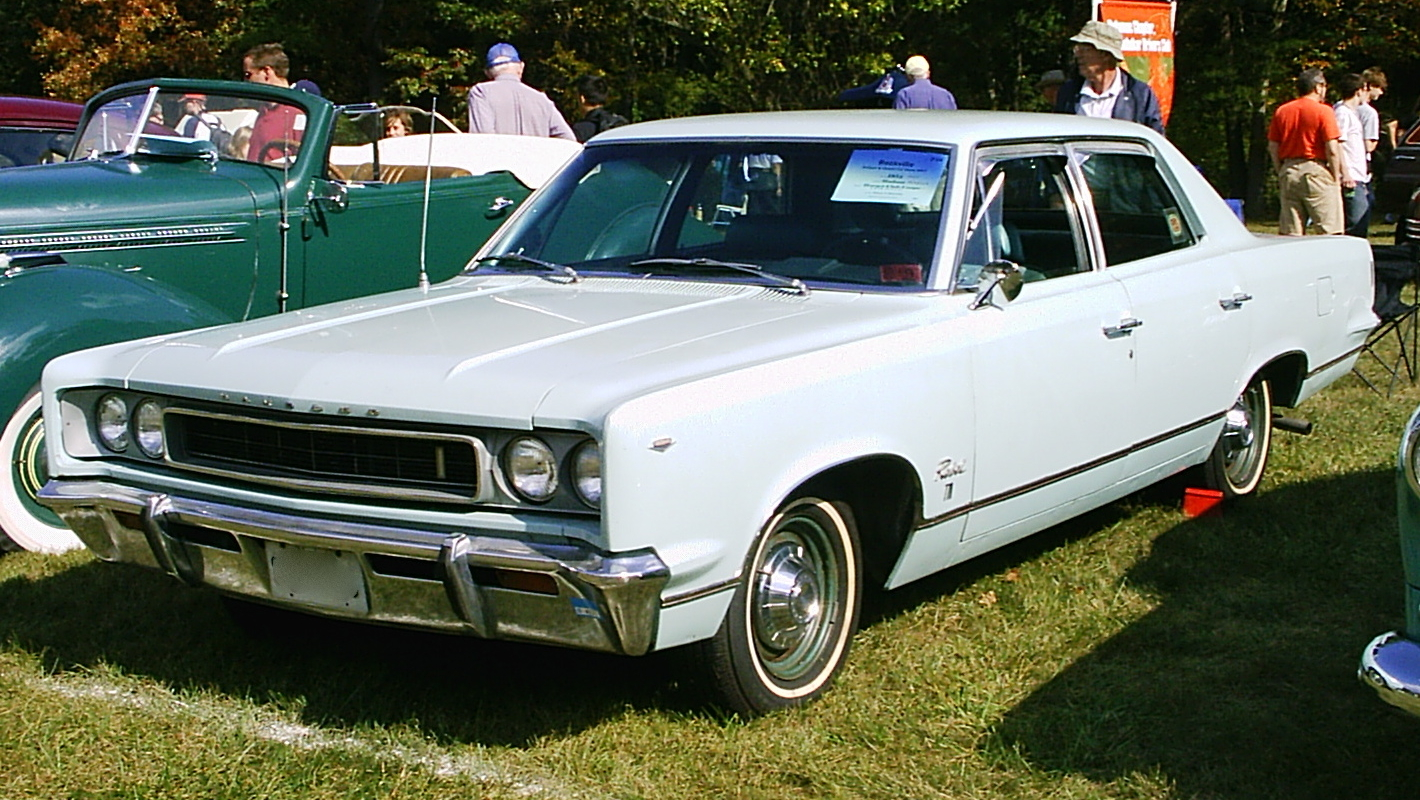
1967 Rambler Rebel 770 sedan

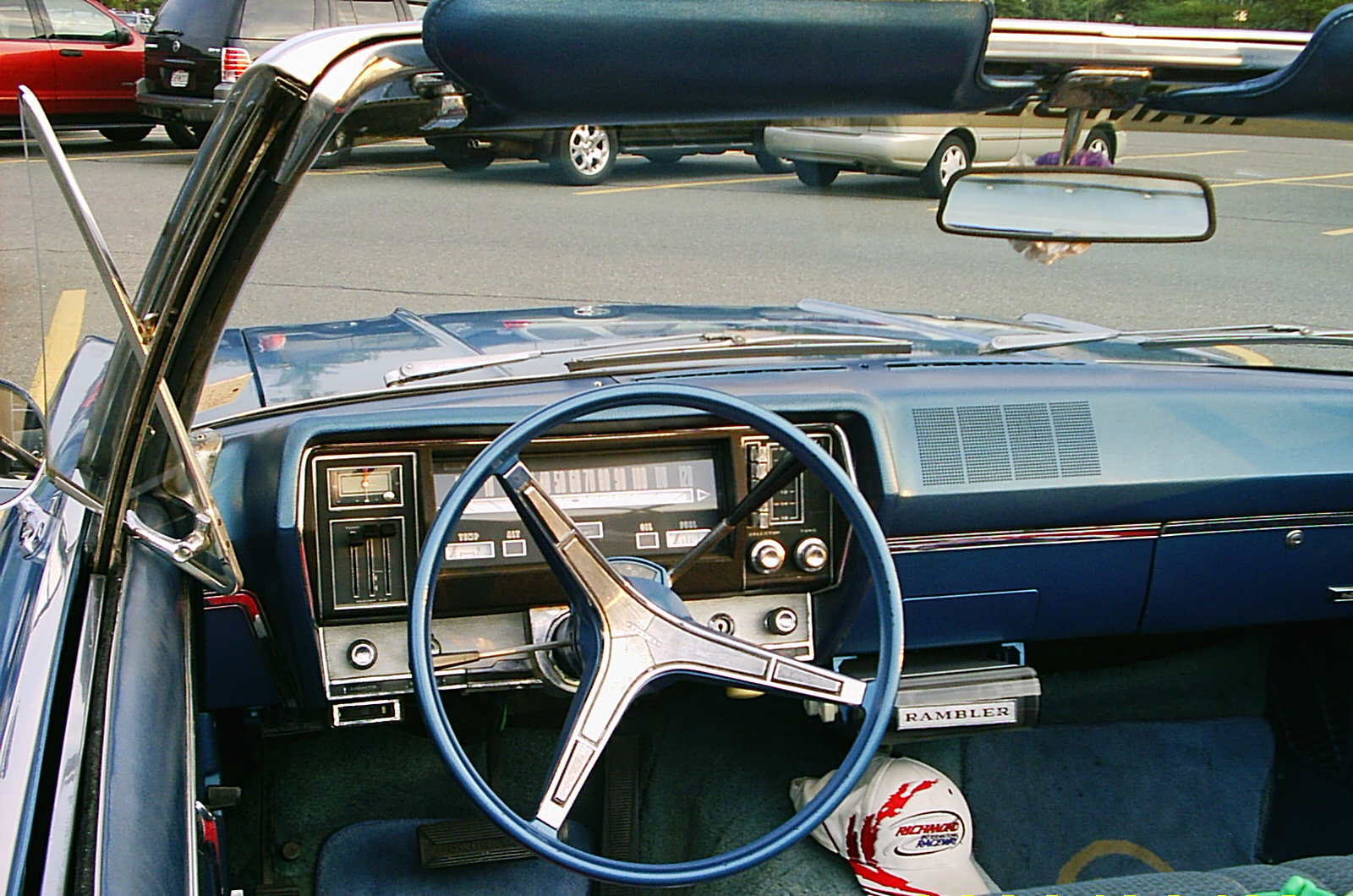
1967 Rambler Rebel 770 safety-oriented instrument panel

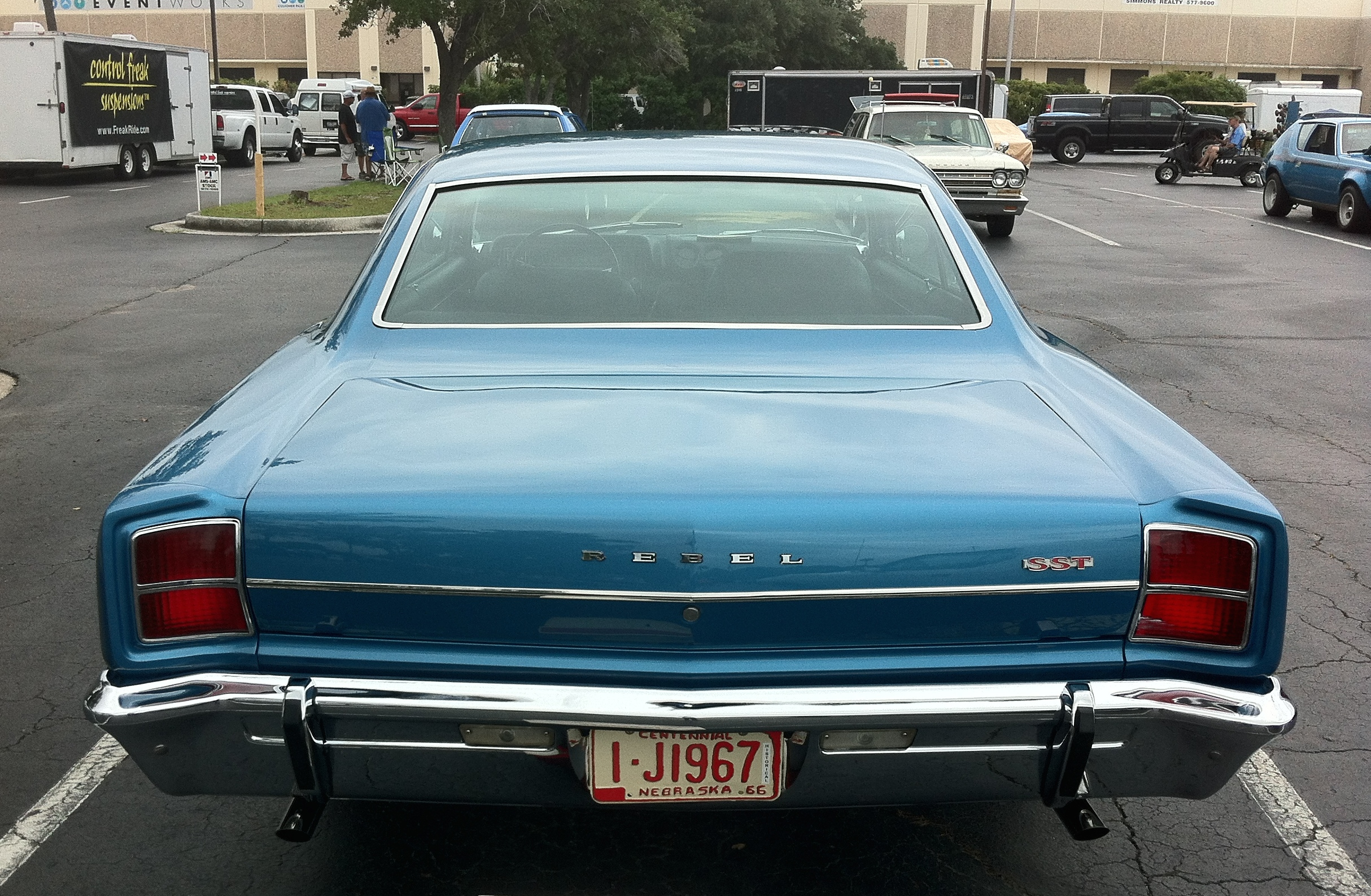
1967 Rambler Rebel SST hardtop semi-fastback design

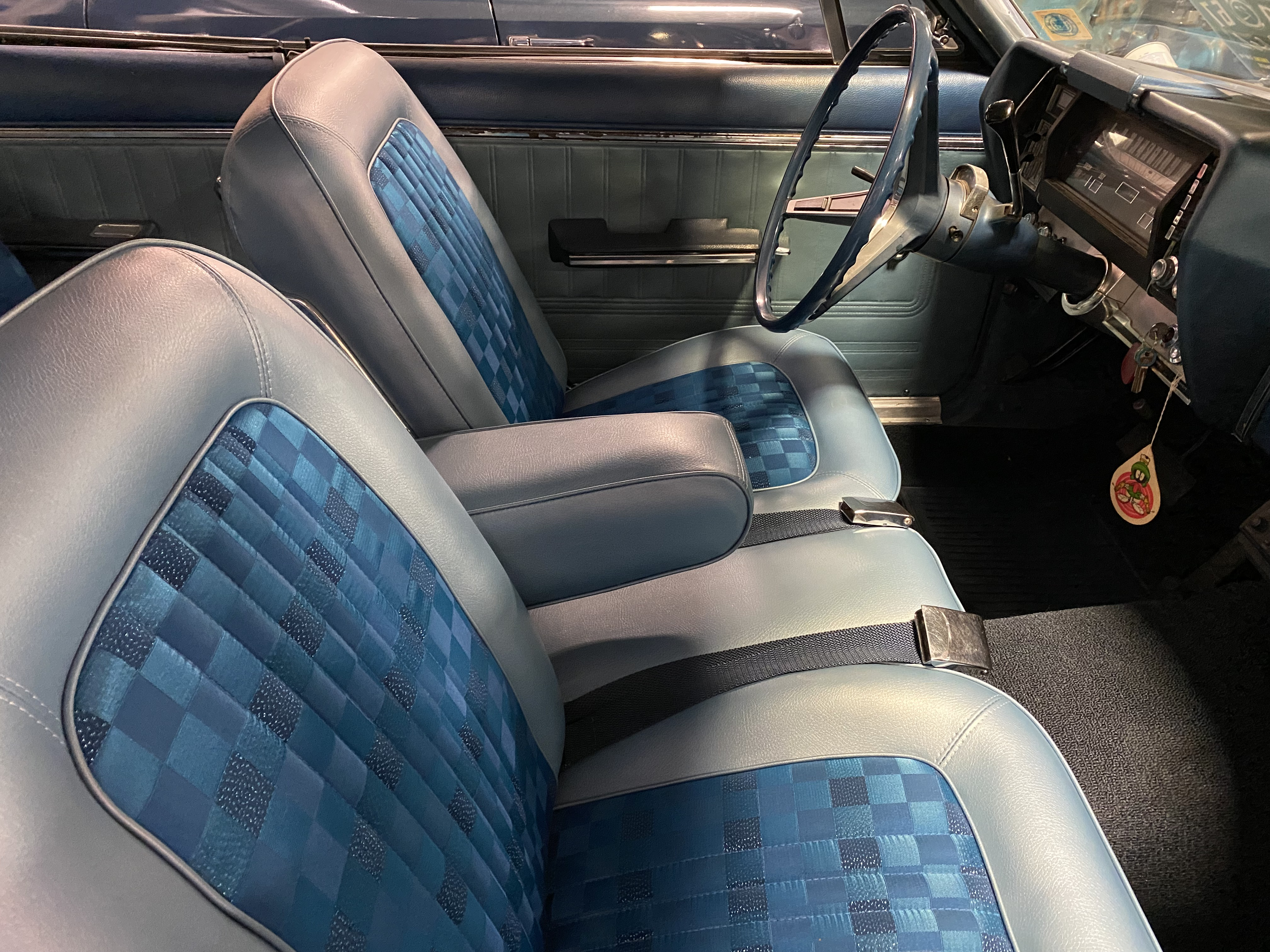
1967 Rambler Rebel SST interior

=== 1968 ===
The 1968 model year Rebels were introduced on 26 September 1967, and were no longer a Rambler in their name. The mid-sized models were now named the AMC Rebel, but little was changed except for the safety features and the mid-model year availability of the 315 hp (235 kW; 319 PS) AMX 390 cu in (6.4 L) V8 that was introduced for the new two-seat AMX model. For ten years AMC "strictly observed the auto industry's anti-racing resolution" but following the management change in 1967, the AMC Rebel began to be campaigned on the dragstrips. The top-of-the-line model SST came standard with the 290 cu in (4.8 L) "Typhoon" V8 while all the other models were available with the 232 cu in (3.8 L) I6 engine.

The 1968 models were treated to a modest restyle of the trim, grille, and taillamps. New mandates by the Federal Motor Vehicle Safety Standards for all 1968 model passenger cars were incorporated. Safety equipment included separate shoulder harness for the front seat belts, two rear lap belts, lighted side markers, padded seat backs, non-glare finish, safety design handles and armrests, energy-absorbing steering column, and optional headrests. American Motors did not wait for the requirements to cars delivered to dealers after 31 December 1967, but incorporated the safety features starting with the early 1968 model year cars produced in late 1967. Other requirements caused increases in the price of all cars manufactured after 1 January 1968, including exhaust control systems to help reduce unburned hydrocarbon and carbon monoxide emissions.

A new AMC safety and styling feature was also introduced on the 1968 Rebels; the flush-mounted paddle-style exterior door handles. These replaced the former push-button design and they became an enduring AMC signature on its passenger cars through 1988 and was continued after the purchase of AMC by Chrysler on the Jeep Wranglers until 2006. The door lock buttons were moved to within the armrests making them easy reach and once set, the door would automatically lock by shutting it from the outside. The interiors of AMC's Rebel made extensive use of a new olefin fiber carpeting.

Also new for 1968 were two trim versions of the convertible body style in the Rebel line. Both the compact-sized Rambler American and the larger AMC Ambassador convertibles were discontinued after 1967, making the Rebels the last true AMC convertibles. The 550 was the base-level trim replacing the convertible model in the American series while still being the lowest-priced open car in the marketplace. The top trim version moved from 770 to the SST model joining the two-door hardtop. Both featured room for six passengers and a power-operated top with a big glass rear window. The two SST body styles included more trim such as simulated air-intakes ahead of the rear wheels, full wheel covers, and a unique grille as well as coil spring seats with the front being individually adjustable with reclining backs.

American Motors changed its advertising agency to Wells, Rich, and Greene, which was headed by Mary Wells Lawrence. The automaker wanted to attract the highly individualistic, "non-average buyer". The new agency established innovative campaigns and promotions for AMC that emphasized value for the money through direct comparisons to the competition as well as showing "elegantly coifed beauties swooping from swank settings into modest AMC Rebels just as contentedly as if the cars were Continentals" - the vastly more expensive luxury cars. Meanwhile, an off-camera voice proclaims: 'Either we're charging too little for our cars or everyone else is charging too much.'" The advertising was highly controversial because it violated the accepted rule of not attacking the competition. This marketing was successful in bringing AMC back to the firm's economy and practical-car roots in customers' minds, which resulted in higher overall sales for the company.

The automaker's profits returned for 1968 after a loss of almost $76 million in 1967, marking its first profitable full year since 1965. Buyers purchased AMC's newly introduced pony car, the Javelin, the two-seat AMX muscle car for 1968 as well as the traditional compact Rambler American and the full-sized Ambassador that was enhanced further with standard air-conditioning for the first time. However, the popularity of the Rebel line declined to 73,895 units as AMC's other models offered features and "drew buyers away from the bread and butter Rebel."

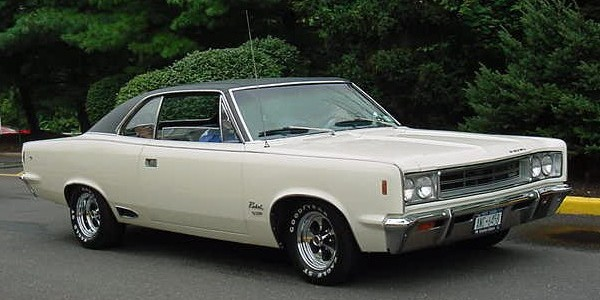
1968 Rebel SST 2-door hardtop with aftermarket wheels

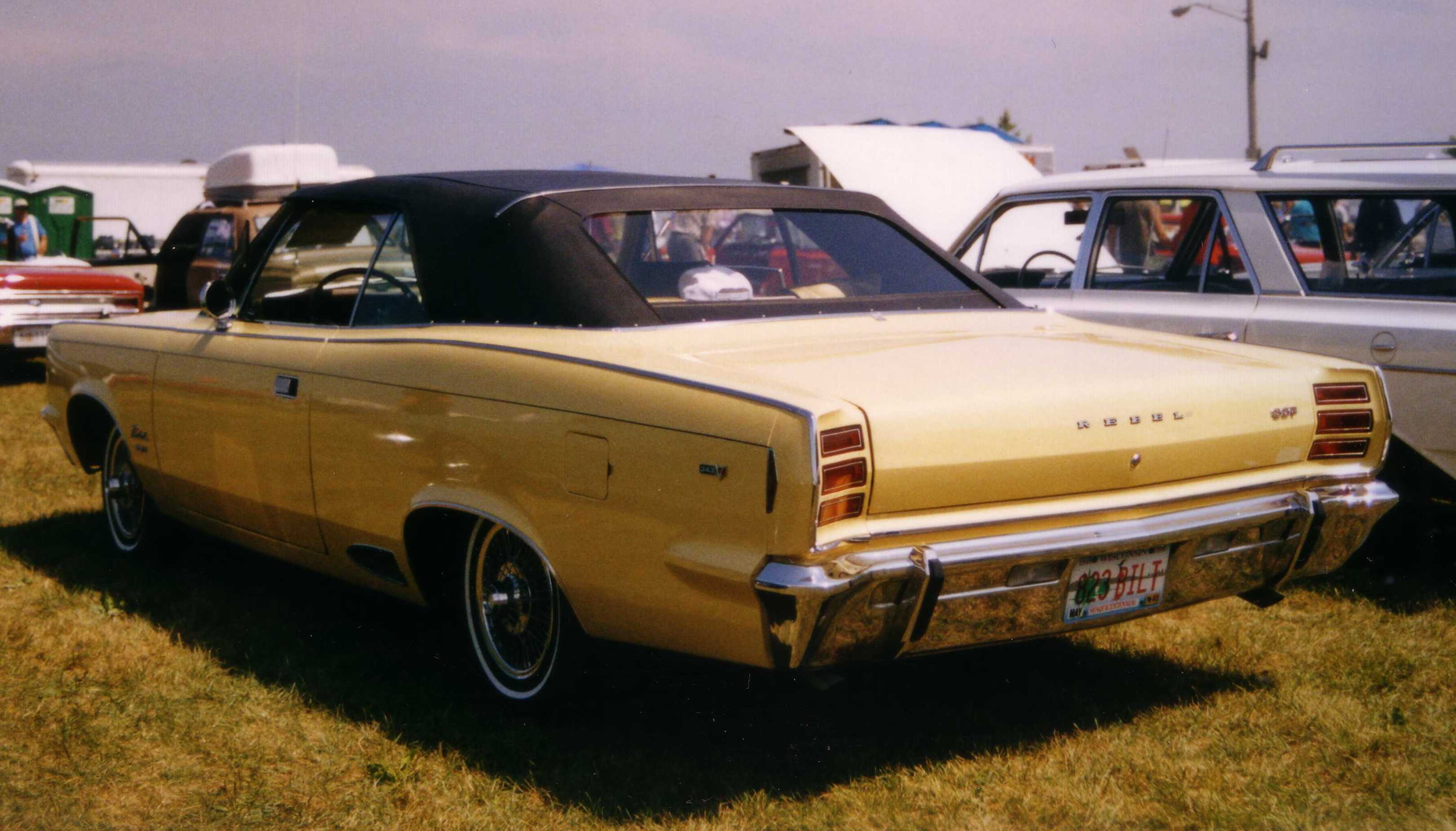
1968 Rebel SST convertible

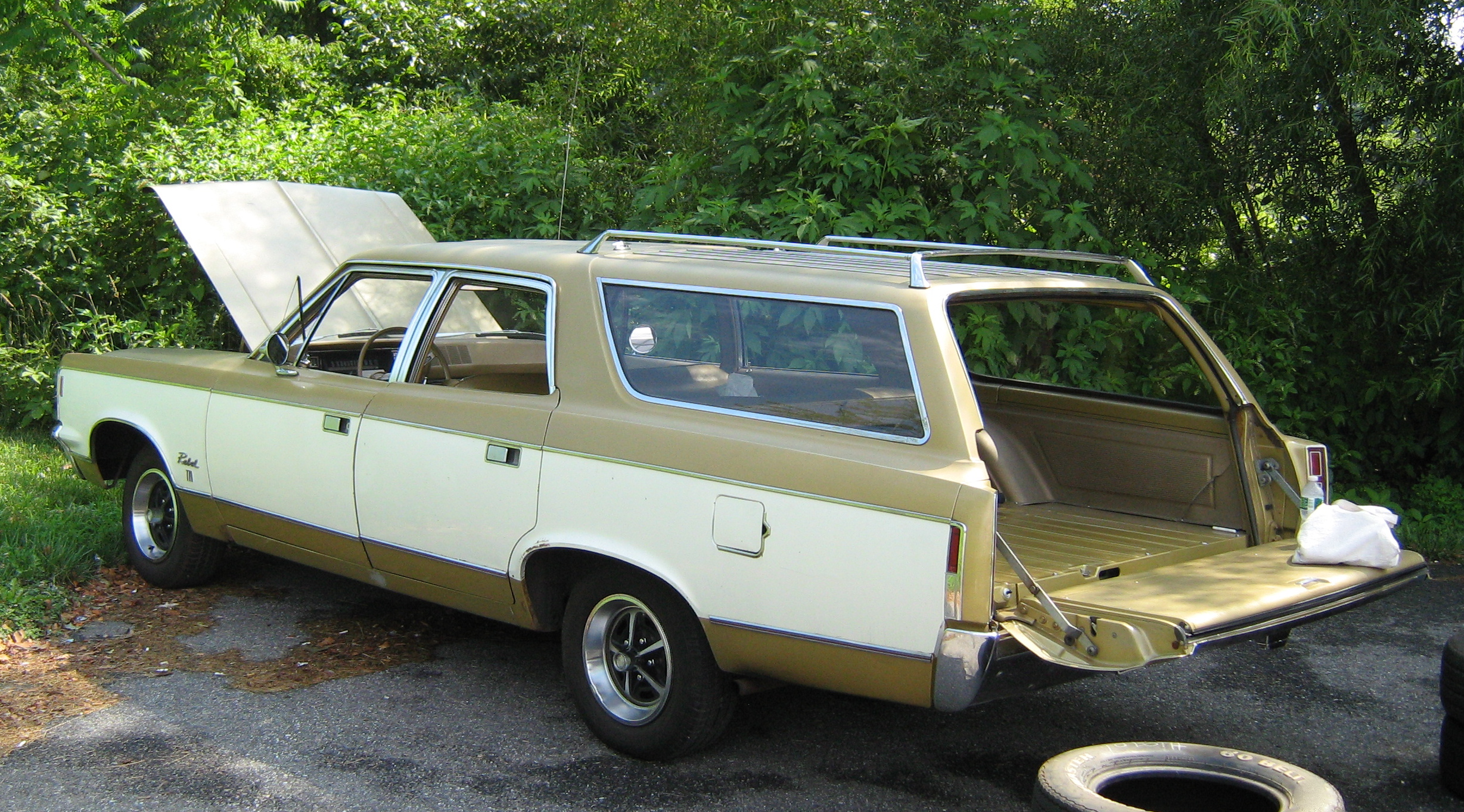
1968 Rebel 770 Cross Country wagon

=== 1969 ===
The 1969 model year model lineup was simplified by dropping the 550 and 770 models, as well as the convertible body style. The four-door sedan, station wagon, and two-door hardtop were now available in base and SST trim. American Motors repositioned the Rebel line to a more "family-oriented" direction and only the two-door SST model received a new simulated "louver" trim ahead of the rear wheel openings.

Exterior changes included a new grille, wrap-around taillights, decklid, as well as trim and ornamentation. The front and rear track was increased from 59 in (1,499 mm) to 60 in (1,524 mm), but all other dimensions remained the same.

The interior received a new deeply hooded instrument panel with clustered instruments and controls in front of the driver. A comparison of all domestic station wagons by Popular Mechanics noted that the intermediate-size models will not carry 4 ft (122 cm) by 8 ft (244 cm) plywood panels flat on the load floor because of width between the wheel well trim, but described the "cargo space in the Rebel wagons is impressive" featuring 91.12 cu ft (2,580 L) of space.

American Motors produced an innovative advertising campaign for the 1969 AMC Rebel that became one of the best TV commercials in one of 15 categories as selected by a team of experts. Known as a builder of "Aunt Martha fuddy-duddy-type cars, but in the late 1960s, at the peak of America's love affair with the auto, AMC wanted to be jazzy." It had previously taken a "totally rational approach" – such as describing the benefits of factory rust-proofing and long warranty coverage. The goal of the new advertising was to highlight AMC's differences and "make an impact" with the car line. Considered "one of the funniest TV commercials of all time – not just for cars" was the advertisement with a 1969 AMC Rebel that is torture-tested by student drivers.

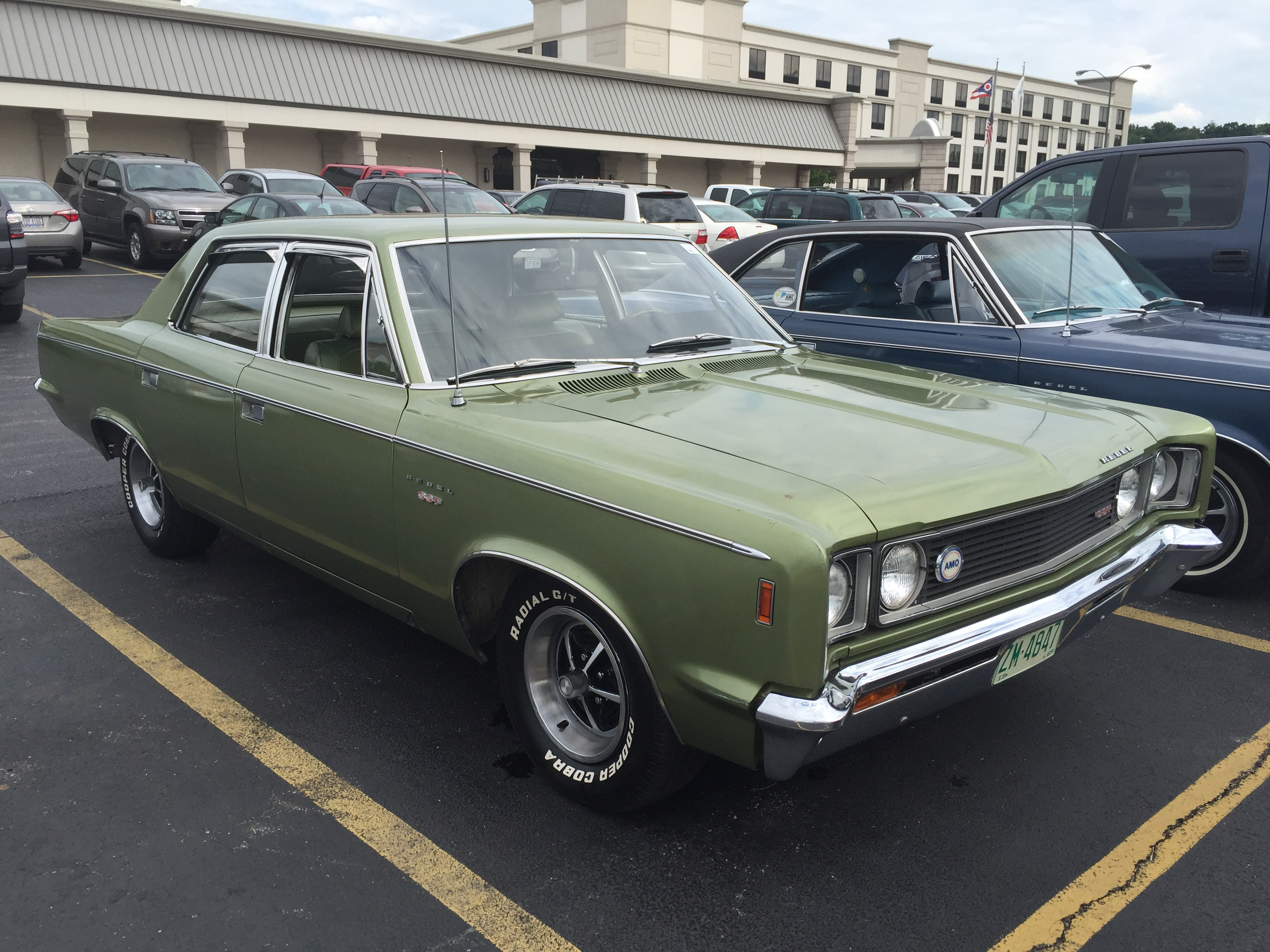
1969 AMC Rebel SST 4-door sedan

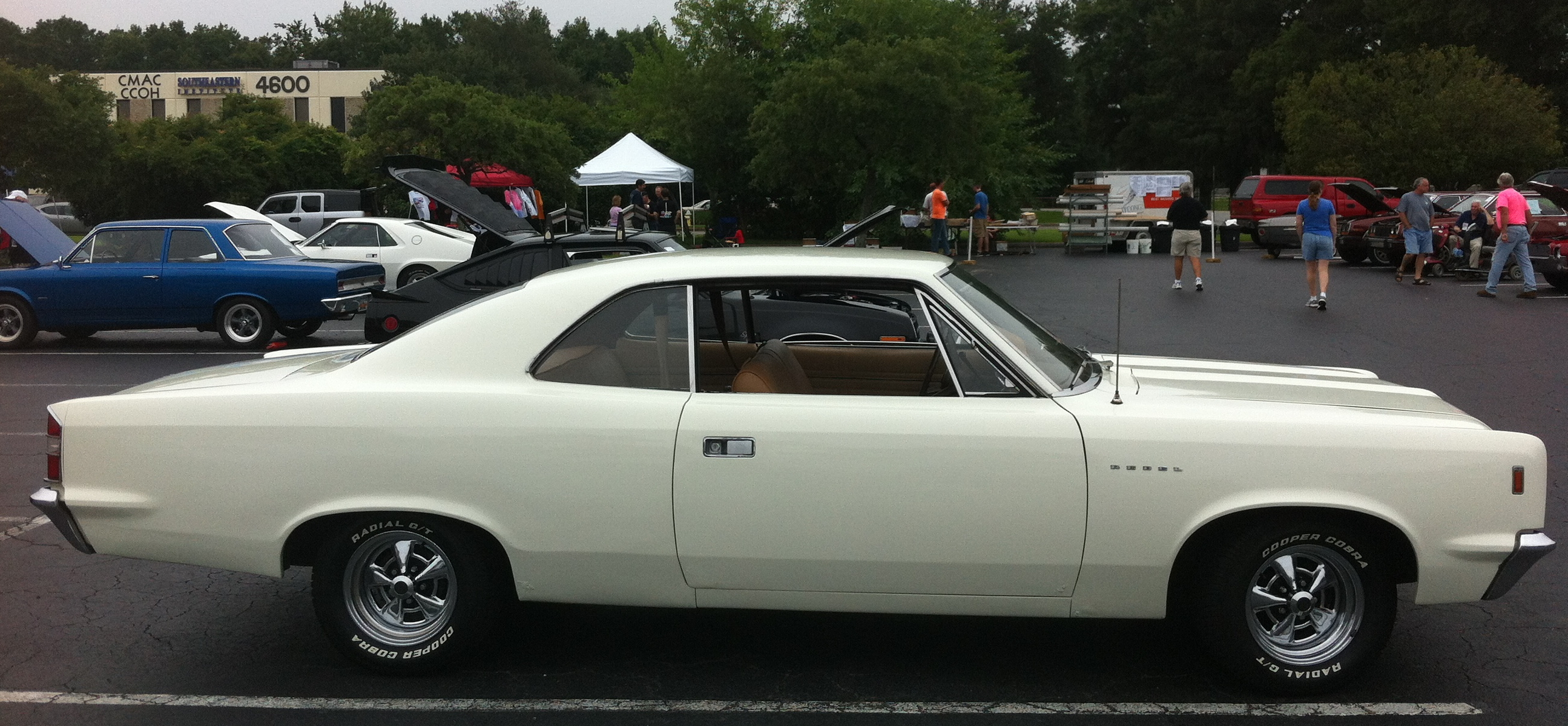
1969 base model AMC Rebel 2-door hardtop with aftermarket wheels

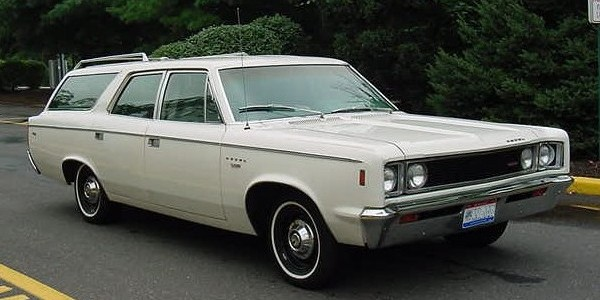
1969 AMC Rebel SST station wagon

=== 1970 ===
The 1970 model year Rebels were introduced on 3 September 1969, bringing styling changes to the four-door sedan and two-door hardtop. The Rebel sedans and hardtop models were now two inches (51 mm) longer. The rear was restyled to feature a large bumper with integrated taillights with Rebel spelled out between them. Unique C-pillar shapes for the sedan and hardtop flowed into raised rear quarters. The two-door hardtop redesign featured a sloping roofline into the rear deck with broad C-pillars. The bodyside and pillar were emphasized by upswept reverse-angle quarter windows with the beltline kicked up where the hardtop's rear windows swept upward and tapered back to the end of the fender blending with the rear bumper sides. The four-door sedans also had an altered roofline with a slimmer C-pillar and larger, squared-off rear door windows. Similarly, as on the coupe, the beltline kicked up beneath the trailing edge of the rear door windows and then tapered back to the same rear fascia as on the hardtop. The new design gave them "a somewhat huskier look for 1970".

The rear end of Rebel station wagons was mostly unchanged with the same C- and D-pillars as well as doors and side windows, but a new roof panel accommodated a longer 6-foot (1,829 mm) luggage rack and new wraparound vertical taillamps with backup lamps in the lowest segment. Two- and three-row wagons included a dual-swing tailgate that could open down to extend even with the load bed or open like a door on its hinges on the left side. This opening assisted egress for the optional rear-facing third-row seat for two passengers. A key- and dashboard-operated electric tailgate window was included with the three-row station wagons.

The grille was again revised with a horizontal split in the middle, and the name "Rebel" was spelled out on the left lip of the hood. The exterior trim, colors, and model identification locations were also modified for 1970. Rebels were available in base or SST trim. The SST models featured a wide upper body trim from the front side marker lamp to the front door handle. The SST station wagons were available in two-tone paint combinations for the body sides, or with simulated woodgrain trim.

Standard safety features were enhanced with equipment mandated under regulations as well as all-new "clamshell" bucket seats with high-backed integrated head restraints. The side structures of the four-door sedans and two-door hardtops were made stronger.

A significant change was to the available AMC V8 engines. The standard 290 cu in (4.8 L) V8 was replaced for 1970 by a new 304 cu in (5.0 L) 210 hp (157 kW; 213 PS) while the 343 cu in (5.6 L) was also supplanted by a 360 cu in (5.9 L). The 360 V8 was available with a two-barrel carburetor rated at 245 hp (183 kW; 248 PS) or in a four-barrel version making 290 hp (216 kW; 294 PS). The "AMX" 390 cu in (6.4 L) engine now produced 325 hp (242 kW; 330 PS) and was optional on SST models. A three-speed manual transmission was available only with the 145 hp (147 PS; 108 kW) or 155 hp (157 PS; 116 kW) 232 cu in (3.8 L) I6 engines. AMC's "Shift-Command" three-speed automatic transmissions were optional, with the shifter on the steering column or mounted on a center console on SST models with bucket seats and any V8 engine.

While the competitive models from the domestic "Big Three" automakers were increasing in size, the Rebel remained smaller and lighter, with a six-cylinder manual two-door hardtop weighing in at 3,110 lb (1,411 kg) and a V8 automatic station wagon at 3,310 lb (1,501 kg) The effect of the changes for 1970 was summarized by the auto editor of Popular Mechanics, "the Rebel has a 'no nonsense' air about it I find appealing.

A Popular Science road test comparing six-cylinder intermediate-sized four-door sedans (Chevrolet Malibu, Ford Torino, and Plymouth Satellite) reported that the AMC Rebel was the quietest, offered the most interior space and trunk room, "yet burns less gas than the others." A Popular Mechanics nationwide survey based on 316,000 miles (508,553 km) of owner-driven miles, found that style, handling, and comfort abound, but so do minor rattles. The 304 cu in (5.0 L) V8 engine was selected by almost 87% of owners for its combination of performance and durability. The AMC Rebels also excelled "in freedom from mechanical troubles and workmanship complaints", with the magazine noting owners took "delivery of perfectly-put-together cars – quite a remarkable feat." Flashy looks and runaway performance were not of primary interest to owners and complaints were minor "such as the guy who dislikes the name".

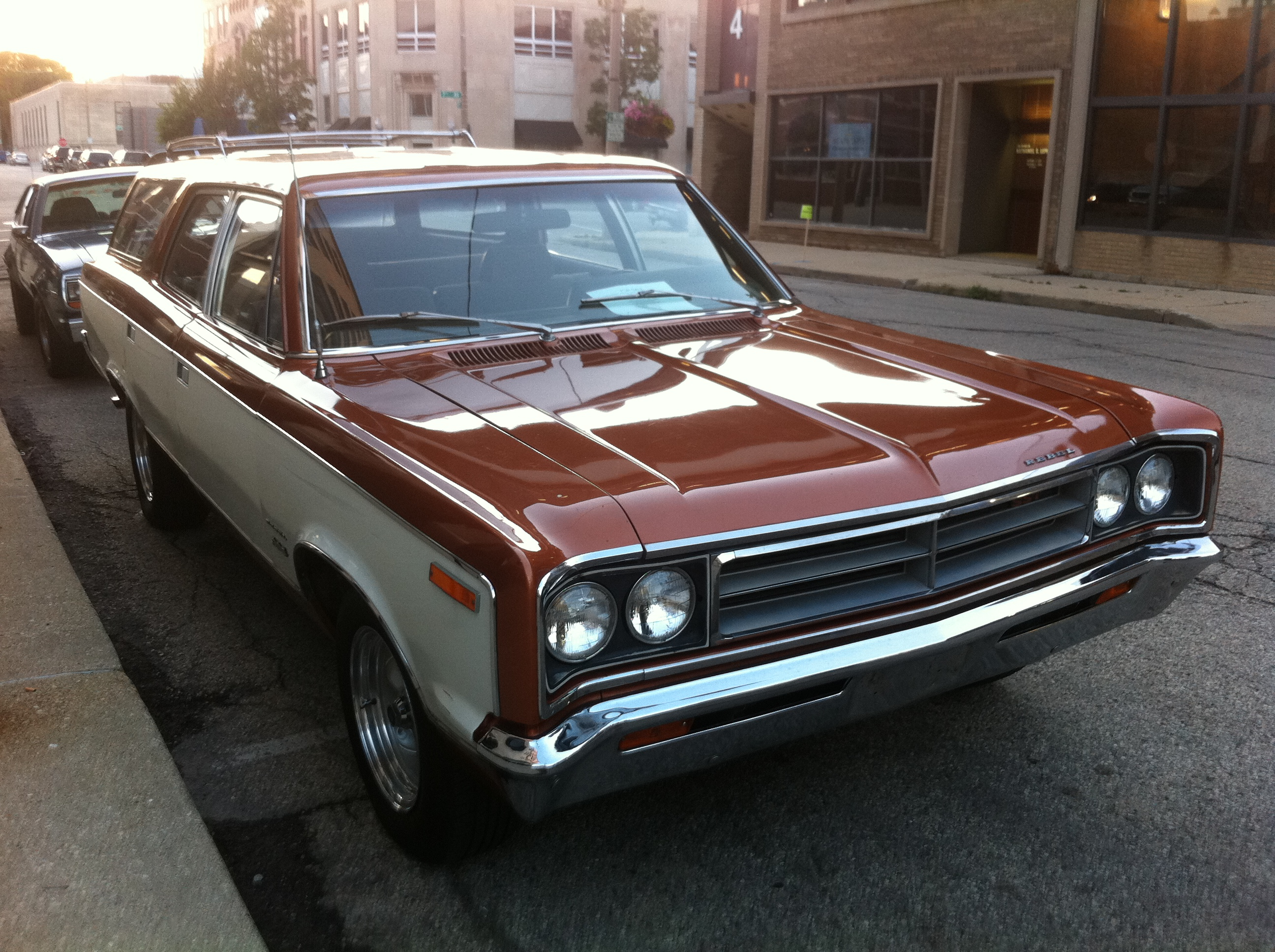
1970 AMC Rebel station wagon

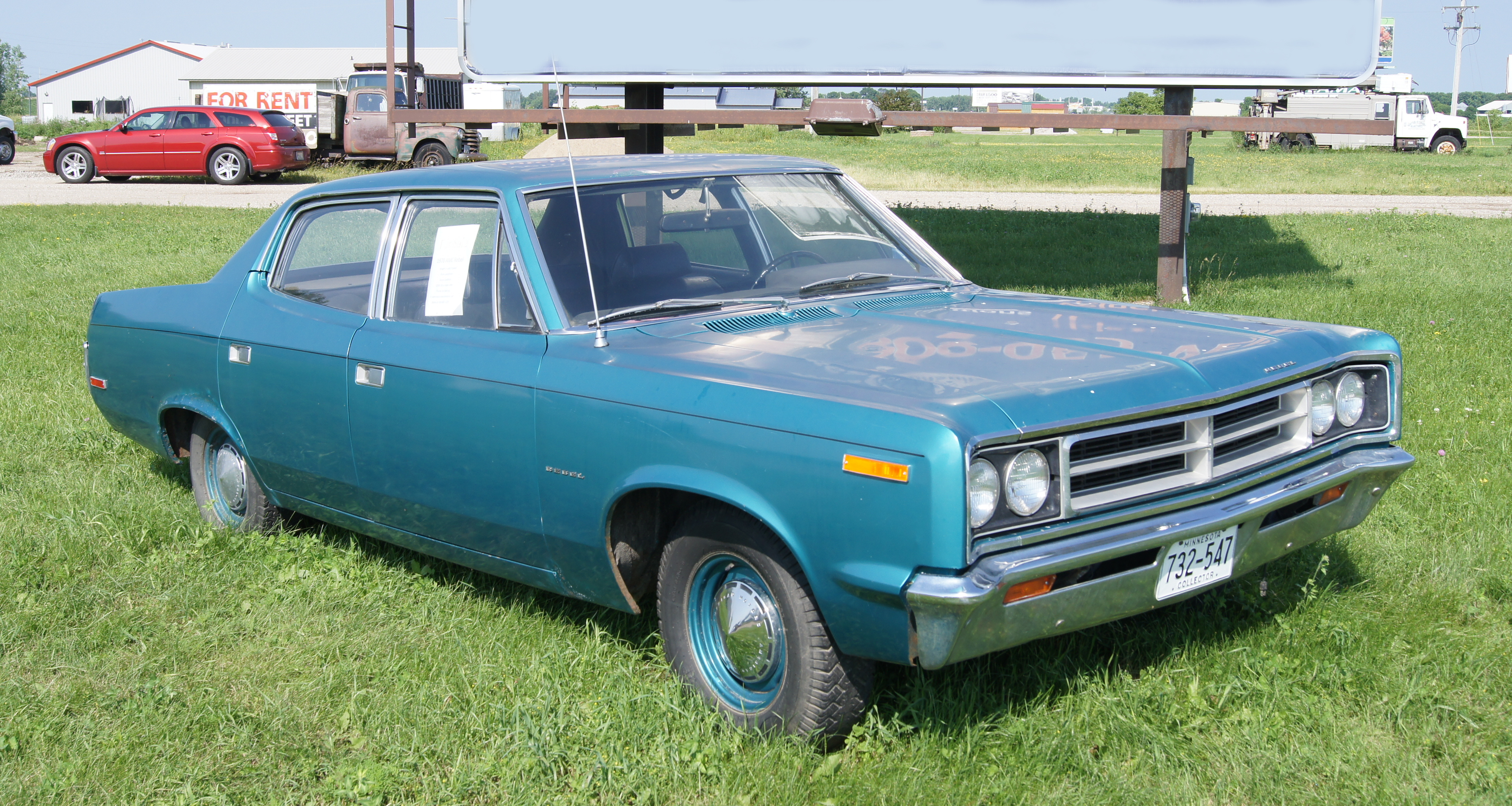
Base model 1970 AMC Rebel sedan

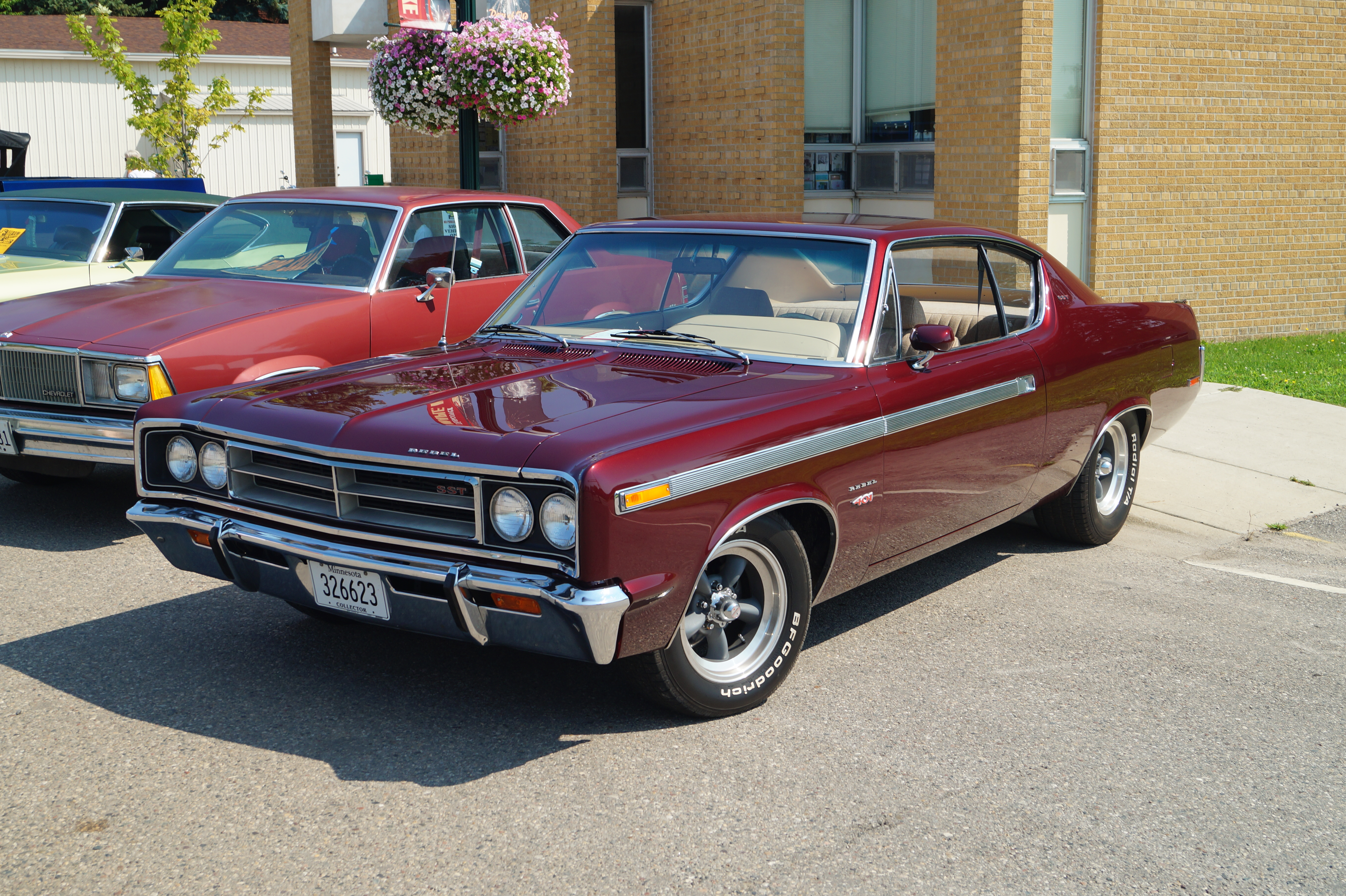
1970 AMC Rebel SST hardtop with one-year-only aluminum bodyside trim

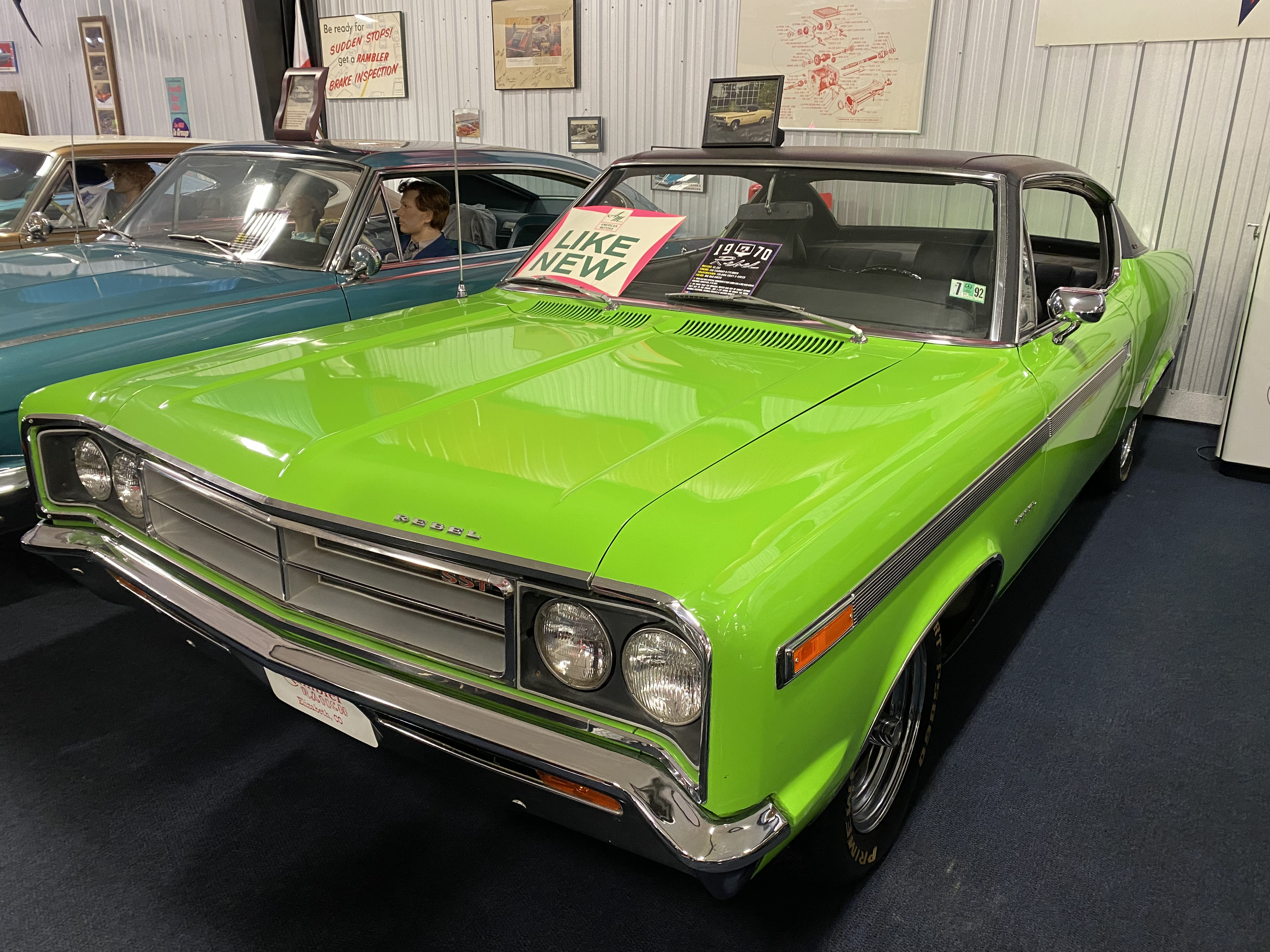
1970 Rebel SST in AMC's "Big Bad Green"

Production numbers:

- Rebel 7019-0 base two-door hardtop: 1,791
- Rebel 7015-0 base four-door sedan: 11,725
- Rebel 7018-0 base four-door station wagon: 8,183
- Rebel 7019-7 SST two-door hardtop: 6,573
- Rebel 7015-7 SST four-door sedan: 13,092
- Rebel 7018-7 SST four-door station wagon: 6,846
- Rebel Machine 7019-7 two-door hardtop: 1,936

The base and SST 1970 Rebels have been described as "good cars by the standards of the era, they served their owners well" but the models have now been forgotten. The station wagon versions were "hum-drum transportation for a family man or a wife and her kids back in the early 1970s".

The overall 1970 design continued into the 1971 model year with changes to taillights, hood, grille, front fenders, bumper, and valance panel along with the Rebel line being repositioned and renamed the AMC Matador.

== Regional models ==
=== Station wagons ===
All regular Rebel station wagons were called Cross Country by AMC. During the 1967 model year, AMC issued a series of three versions of regionally marketed Rebel station wagons each with a unique appearance trim, and all included a package of power and convenience equipment.

Designed to spur interest in all of AMC's products and to generate increased sales for the company, the special wagons were limited for sale to geographical areas. Targeted advertisements illustrated the distinct features of each of the three versions. According to automotive historian James C. Mays, the regional wagon marketing program was a success and it contributed to increasing confidence among the public in the "feisty" automaker.

Standard equipment on all regional wagons included 290 cu in (4.8 L) V8 engine (the 343 cu in (5.6 L) was optional), automatic transmission, power steering, power drum brakes, as well as special duty springs and shock absorbers. Each featured a distinctive interior and exterior trim:

- The Mariner (600 units) in Barbados Blue paint with bodyside panels and rear tailgate trimmed in simulated bleached teak wood planking accented by narrow black horizontal stripes and a "nautical anchor" medallion. The interior featured anchors and stars decorating dark blue suede bolster panels of the seats, which also had white piping and broad horizontal pleated inserts of medium blue antelope grain vinyl. The Mariner was sold along the coastal regions of the United States.
- The Briarcliff (400 units) in Matador Red paint with simulated black camera grain bodyside panels and "regal" medallions, as well as its own black "antelope grain" vinyl interior. The Briarwood was marketed in major markets in the east and south.
- The Westerner (500 units) in Frost White paint with wood plank trim side inserts for the body side and tailgate, as well as a "Pony Express" medallion. The interior featured stallion brown vinyl that simulated "richly tooled" leather on the seats and door panels in combination with white antelope-grained vinyl. The Westerner was available west of the Mississippi River.

Each version included the color-coordinated upholstery and door panels, individually adjustable reclining seats, a sports steering wheel, as well as the 91 cubic feet (2.6 m^{3}) of carpeted cargo room, a locking hidden compartment, and a roof rack. Special regional nameplates were on the rear fender in addition to the unique medallions on the C-pillar.

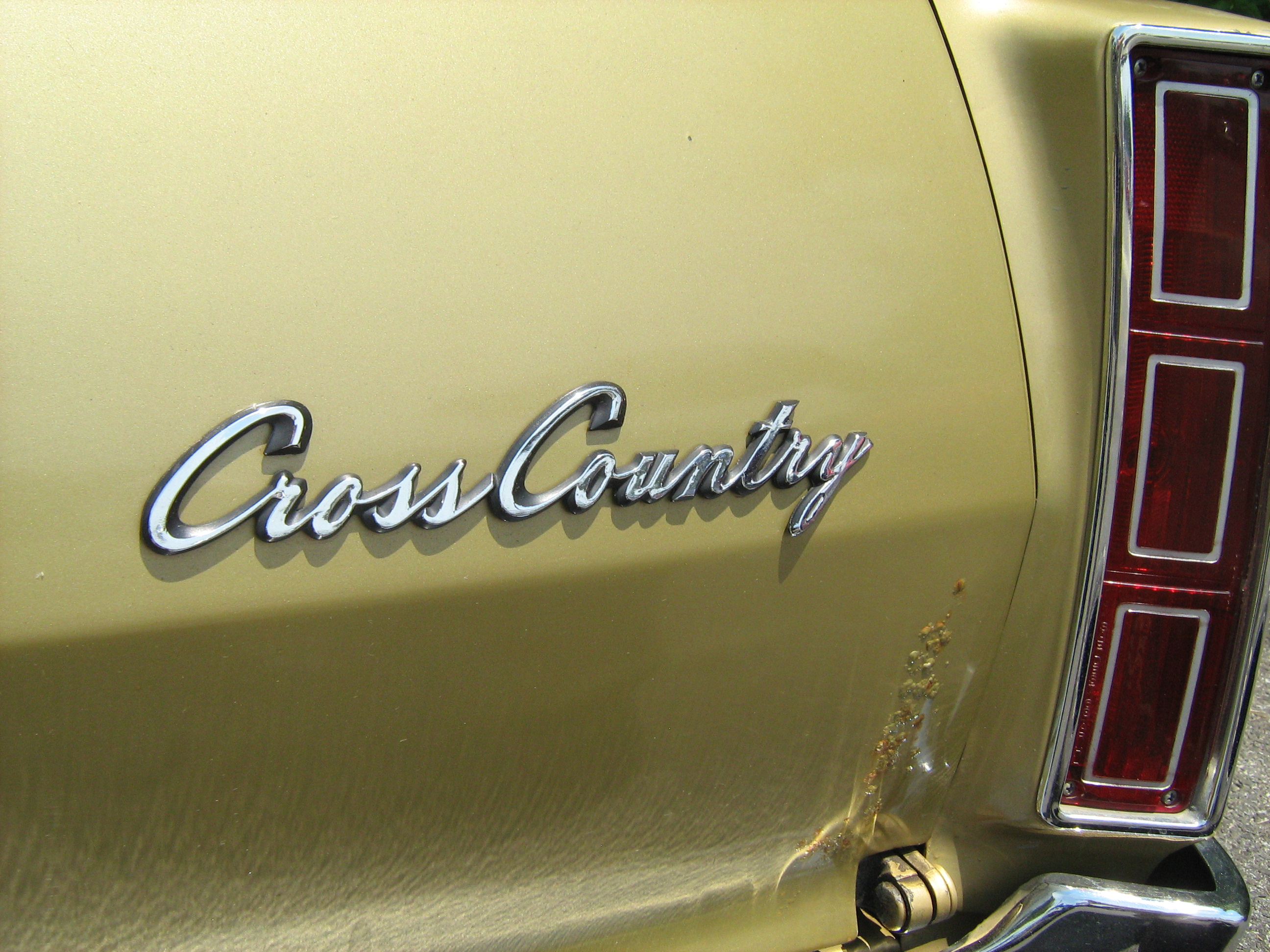
Cross Country station wagon emblem

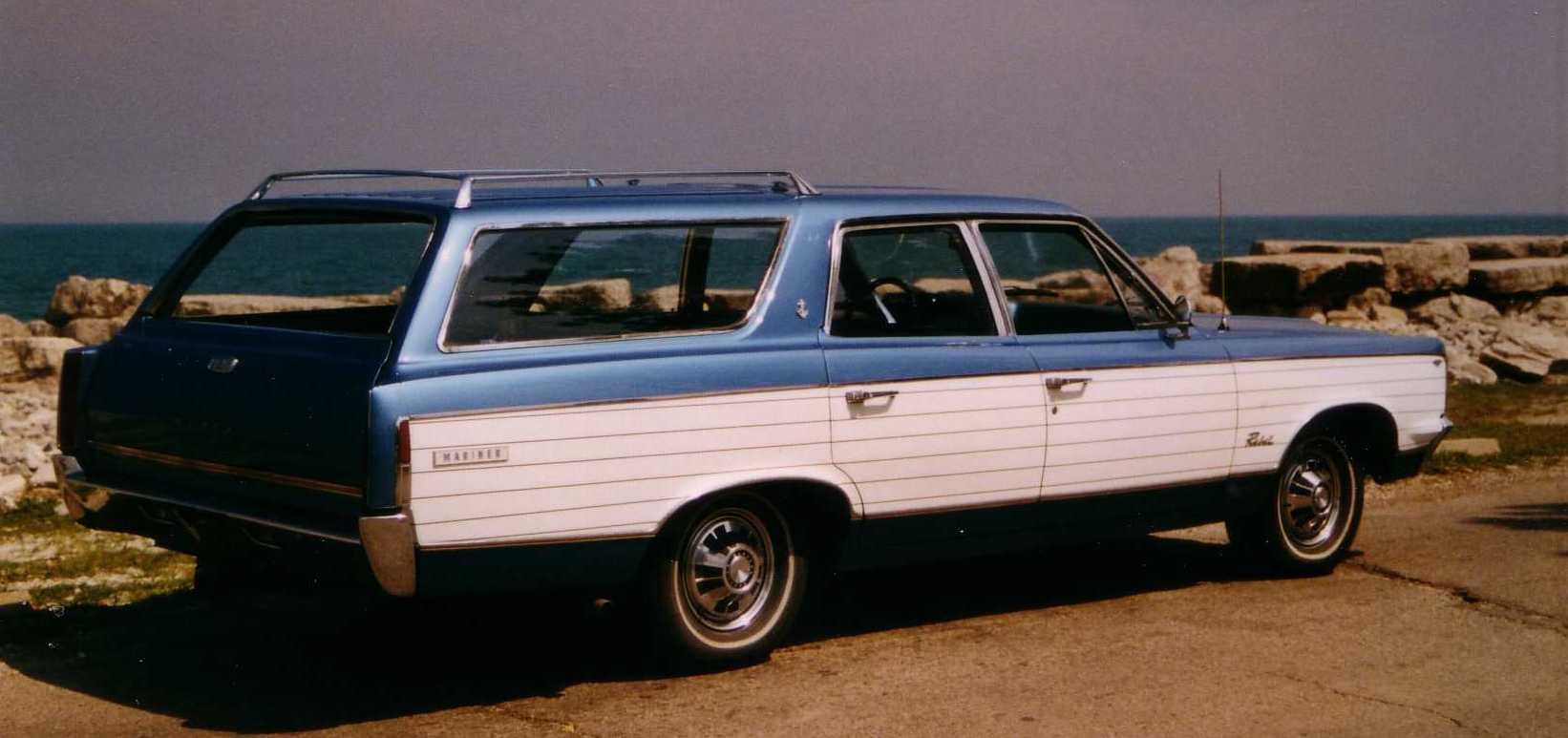
Rambler Rebel "Mariner" wagon

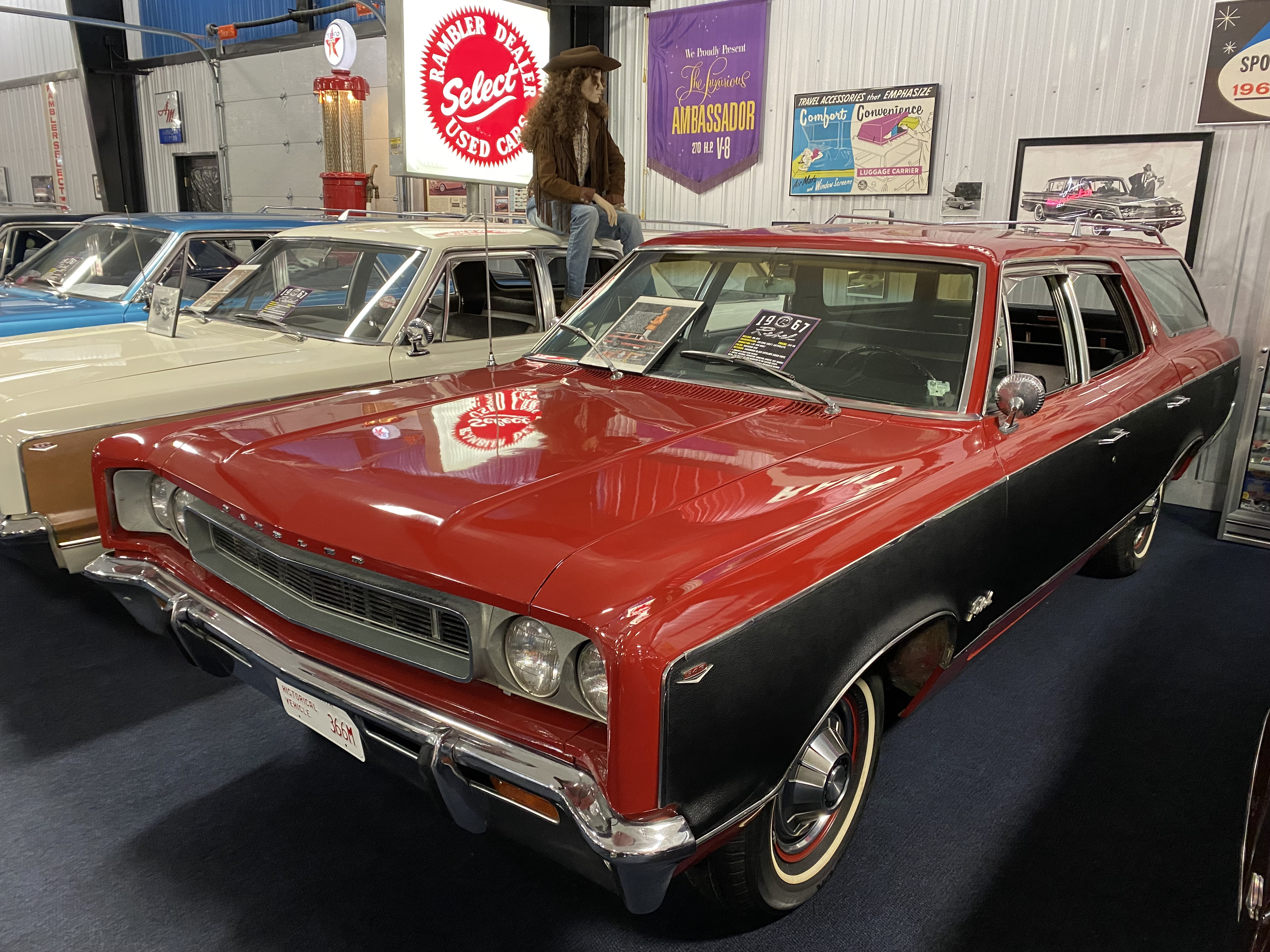
Rambler Rebel "Briarcliff" wagon

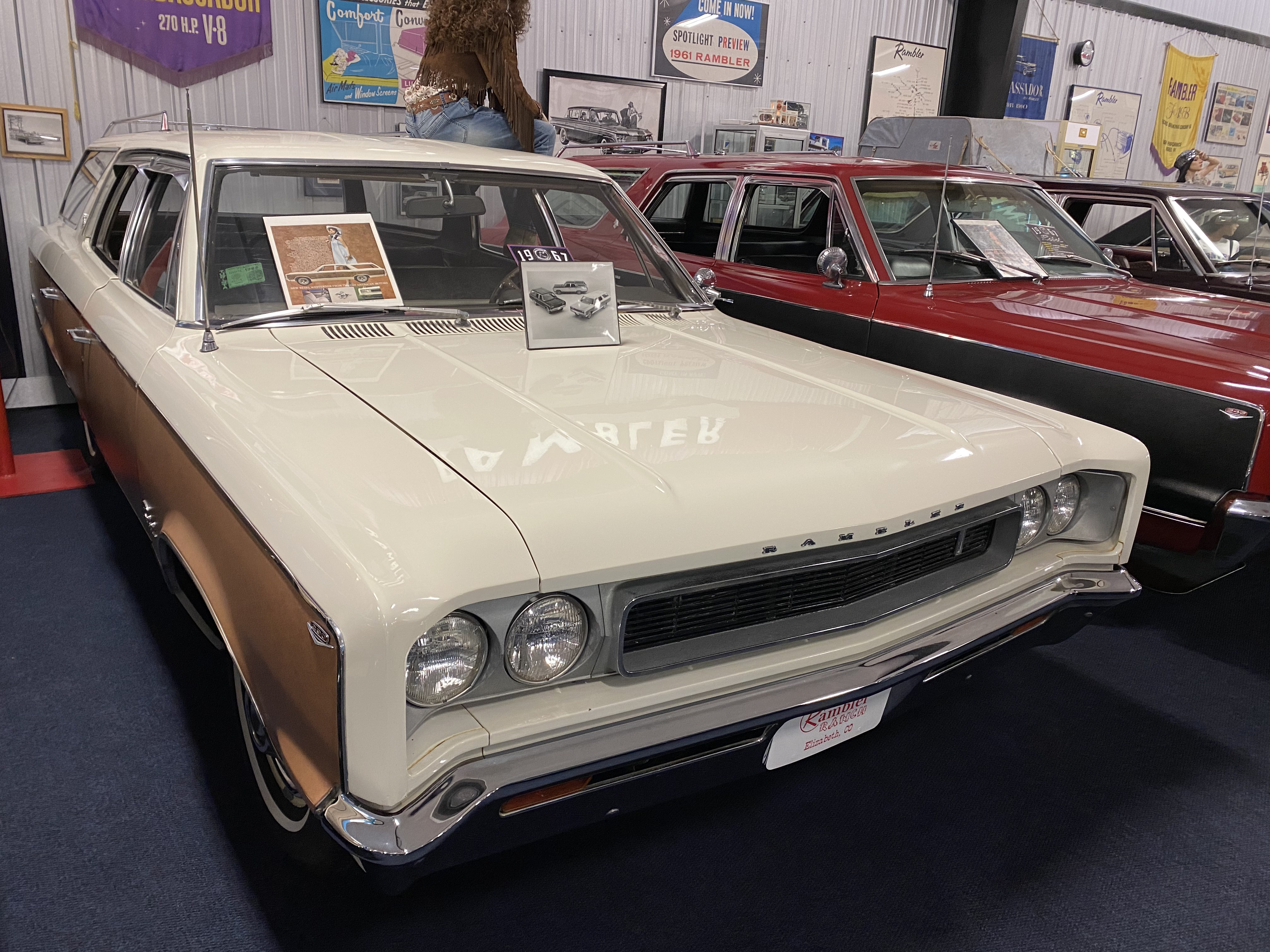
Rambler Rebel "Westerner" wagon

=== Raider ===
In 1969, a Rebel Raider two-door hardtop was sold only in New York and New Jersey. The marketing of these cars was timed to coincide with the New York City Auto Show. A total of three hundred Raiders were built and 75 took part in a "driveaway" by area dealers on the eve of the Auto Show. All Raiders came with a 290 cu in (4.8 L) V8 engine with column-shifted automatic transmission, as well as "blow-your mind colors to choose from: electric green, tangerine, and blue-you've never seen".

This limited model was a test market of the "Big Bad" colors by AMC through a regional dealer-led promotional campaign. The bright hues were later introduced at mid-year on the Javelin and AMX models. Other standard features on the Raider included black upholstery and carpeting, black front grille, black vinyl roof, a sports-type steering wheel, AM radio, power steering, and power brakes. The total price of the special Raider models was advertised at US$2,699. The objective of this exclusive offering at a tempting price was to get potential customers curious enough to visit dealer showrooms to possibly buy it or provide the salesperson with the opportunity to sell them a different one.

== Rebel funny cars ==
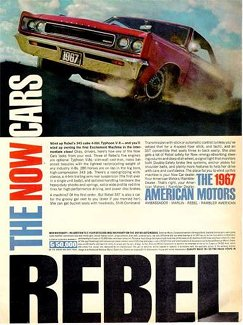
1967 AMC ad for the Rebel shows how AMC marketing attempted to produce ads designed to change the perception that AMC only made economy cars

Under the leadership of Roy Abernethy, AMC observed both the letter and spirit of the resolution prohibiting automakers from sponsorship in automobile racing. It was instituted by the Automobile Manufacturers Association (AMA) in 1957. As Rambler's sales reached third place in the domestic marketplace, AMC continued to advertise the only race the company was interested in was the human race. However, with AMC's precarious financial condition in 1966 following the race to match its "Big Three" domestic competitors under Roy Abernethy, the new management reversed AMC's anti-racing strategy and decided to enter motorsports as a method to gain exposure, publicity, and a performance image.

American Motors' Performance Activities Director Carl Chakmakjian was charged with getting AMC automobiles into racing, which would help to attract a younger customer base. In a "quest for quarter-mile glory", AMC reached a $1 million (US$9,655,689 in 2015 dollars) agreement in 1967 with Grant Industries in Los Angeles, California (a manufacturer of piston rings, ignition systems, and steering wheels), to build the Grant Rambler Rebel, a "Funny Car" racer to compete in the National Hot Rod Association (NHRA) X/S (Experimental Stock) and Super Experimental Stock classes.

When asked why the company decided to work with AMC, Grant's president, Grant McCoon responded, "Rambler is a good automobile, and it's time somebody proved what it can do". The relationship provided both companies with national exposure and publicity. The car had an altered wheelbase 122-inch (3,099 mm) RCS (chrome moly steel) tube chassis with a 343 cu in (5.6 L) AMC V8 engine that was bored and stroked to 438 cu in (7.2 L) tuned by Amos Satterlee. With its GMC 6–71 blower and Enderle fuel injection, the motor produced 1,200 hp (895 kW; 1,217 PS) winding up to 9000 rpm on a mixture of alcohol and nitromethane. Starting in June 1967, the car was driven by "Banzai" Bill Hayes and painted red featuring a blue racing stripe with white stars. Soon, Hayden Proffitt took over the Grant funny car program and ran the Rebel on the quarter-mile (402 m) from a standing start in 8.11 seconds at 180.85 mph (291.0 km/h).

For the 1968 season, a new car was built and renamed the Grant Rebel SST and painted in the new hash red, white, and blue AMC corporate racing colors. With Hayden driving, the car consistently ran the dragstrip in the mid-eight second range at speeds around 180 miles per hour (290 km/h). By the end of 1968, AMC dropped out of funny car racing to concentrate on its new Javelin pony car in SCCA Trans Am road racing, while Proffitt retired from racing for a few years.

In 1968, Ron Rosenberry drove the King Rebel of Ted McOsker using a blown fuel Chrysler Hemi engine and had a known best of 9.58 seconds at 148.02 mph (238.2 km/h) in the quarter-mile dragstrip.

== The Machine ==
The most recognizable muscle car version of the AMC Rebel was named The Machine and was available for the 1970 model year, following the success of the 1969 SC/Rambler. In its most recognizable trim, it was painted white with a large blue stripe on its hood, and accented in bold red, white, and blue reflective stripes (made by 3M) in the front, sides, and rear. "The car had the build of a proper muscle car, and when it came to its performance, it did not disappoint despite weighing over 1,500 kg (3,307 lb)."

A special high-performance V8 producing 340 hp (345 PS; 254 kW) at 5,100 rpm and maximum torque of 430 lb⋅ft (583 N⋅m) at 3,600 rpm was standard on The Machine with a single four-barrel Motorcraft carburetor This was the most potent engine AMC would ever offer in a regular production vehicle.

=== Concept muscle models ===
First proposed in June 1968, the car was to have been a 1969 Rebel coupe finished in black with authoritative black wheels and fat tires, without any stripes, scoops, or spoilers, but with an aggressive, street-fighting stance. The proposed model included "The Machine" decal on the rear (that made it into production), as well as a "fab gear" logo on the front fender.

However, an even earlier attempt at a Rebel-based muscle car was made by AMC's engineering team: a 1967 two-door built as a development "project" car for carburetion-testing purposes, as well as with "Group 19" high-performance options, and the car was re-equipped with a modified 390 cu in (6.4 L) engine with an estimated 500 hp (370 kW) "capable of running in the 11-second bracket." The car was considered a legal drag racing car, according to National Hot Rod Association (NHRA) and American Hot Rod Association (AHRA) rules and regulations in effect during those years. The Machine was finished in AMC's trademark red, white, and blue color scheme, although the color breaks were not the same as on other AMC-backed or developed race cars.

=== Performance features ===
American Motors' high-performance "halo" vehicle made its official debut on 25 October 1969, in Dallas, Texas. This was the site of the National Hot Rod Association's World Championship Drag Race Finals. The Rebel Machine was factory-rated at 10.7 pounds per horsepower, positioning the car for the NHRA F-stock class. The introductory marketing campaign consisted of ten vehicles (five with automatics and five with four-speed manuals) that were driven from the factory in Kenosha, Wisconsin to Dallas, Texas and raced in the condition they arrived in. Several were used in a parade with Linda Vaughn during the festivities.

There were four cars on the track "in bone-stock trim" that ran solid mid-14s during the press day at the now-defunct Dallas International Motor Speedway. All these cars were subsequently campaigned at numerous other drag strips and subsequently sold as used vehicles according to AMC corporate policy. The automaker's marketing objective was for each AMC dealer to have one colorful Rebel Machine on display in their showrooms to lure non-AMC potential customers so they could be introduced to the other models. The most successful dealers raced the cars at local drag strips.

The Machine was developed from a collaboration between Hurst Performance and AMC, but unlike the compact SC/Rambler, there was no official connection between the two parties once production commenced. The standard engine in The Machine was AMC's 390 cu in (6.4 L) V8 engine rated at 340 hp (254 kW) at 5100 rpm and 430 lb⋅ft (583 N⋅m) of torque at 3600 rpm. It came with special heads, valve train, cam, as well as a redesigned intake and exhaust. This was the most powerful in any AMC vehicle while retaining features required for normal street operations, as well as components to assure outstanding performance characteristics without incurring high-unit cost penalties. The engine is fed by a 690-cfm Motorcraft four-barrel carburetor, and a 10.0:1 compression requiring high-octane gasoline.

The Machine featured a large ram-air intake hood scoop that was painted Electric Blue (code B6) with a large tachometer visible to the driver and integrated into a raised fairing at the rear of the scoop. This hood-mounted tach came from the same vendor as used on competing makes with only different dial faces. Early production hood scoops were fiberglass layups, while those installed on Machines after 1 January 1970 were injection molded and of higher quality. The heavy-duty suspension was augmented by station wagon springs in the rear (with a higher load rating), giving the car a raked look. Standard was a Borg-Warner T-10 four-speed manual transmission with a Hurst floor shifter backed by either 3.54:1 or 3.91:1 rear axle gear ratios in the "Twin-Grip" differential, as well as power disc brakes, wide E60x15 Goodyear Polyglas white letter tires mounted on "Machine" mag-styled steel 15-inch (381 mm) x 7-inch (178 mm) wheels, and a black interior with bucket seats and a center armrest upholstered in red, white, and blue vinyl.

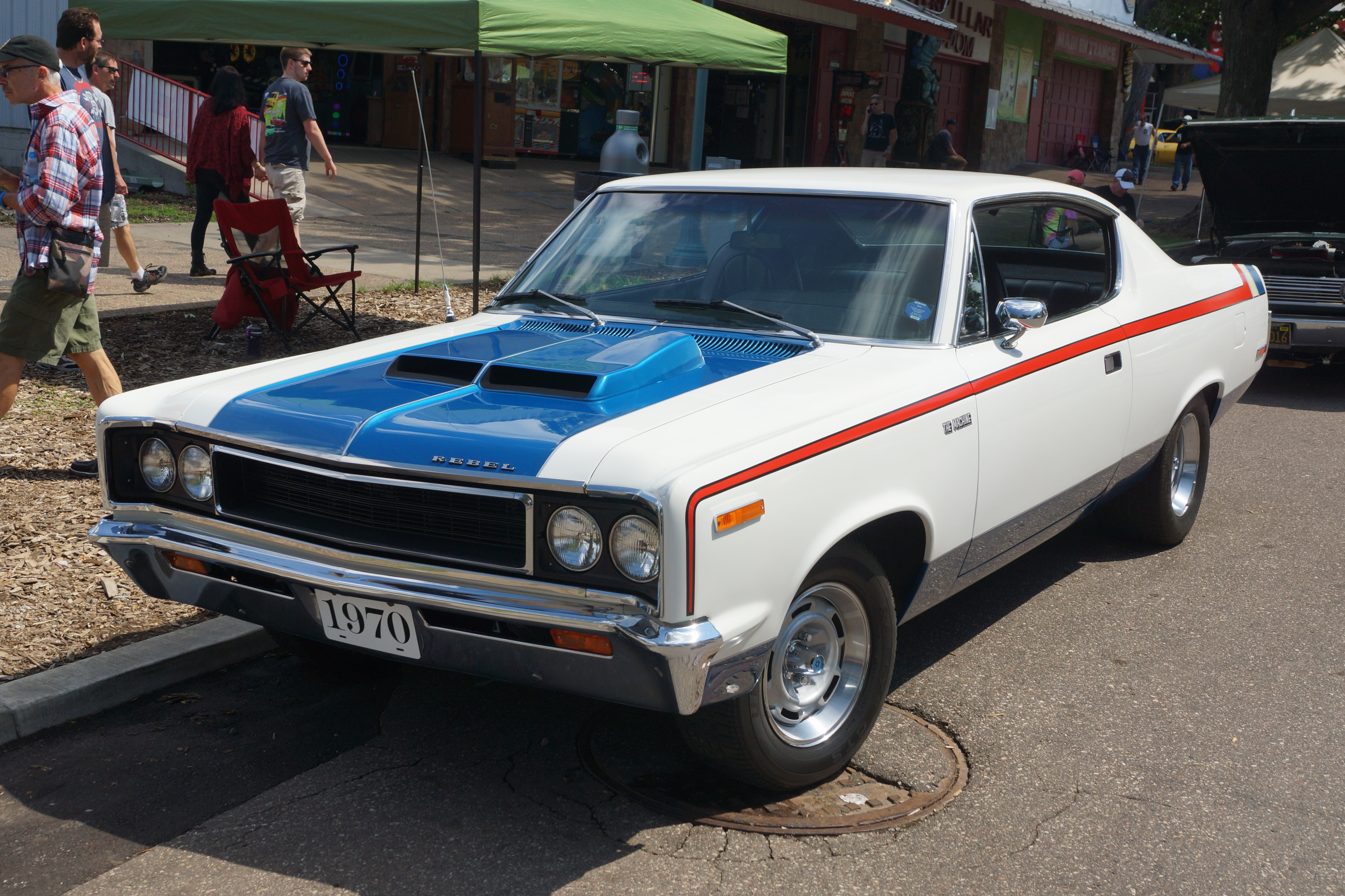
In white with red, white, and blue stripes

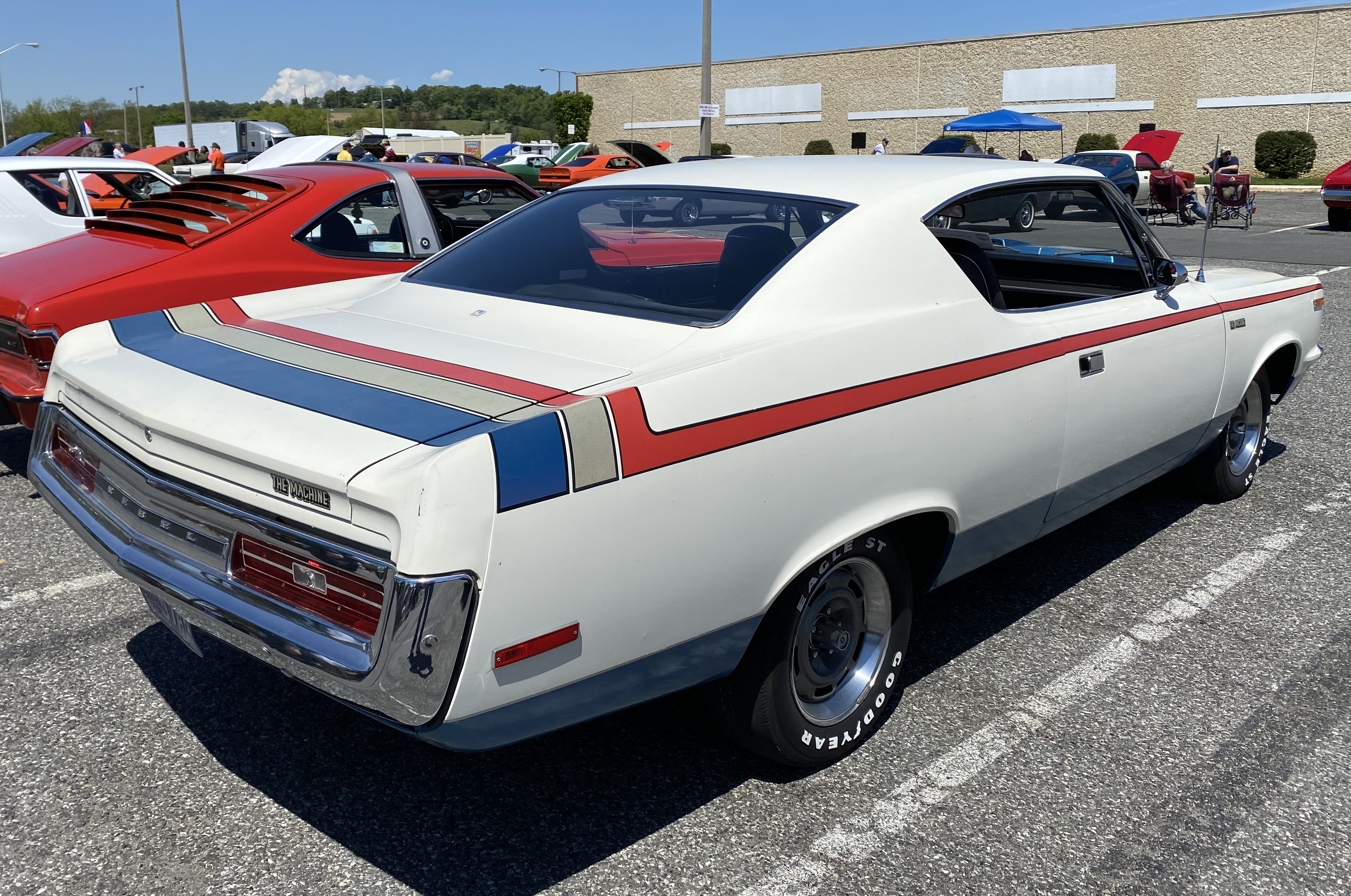
In white with red, white, and blue stripes

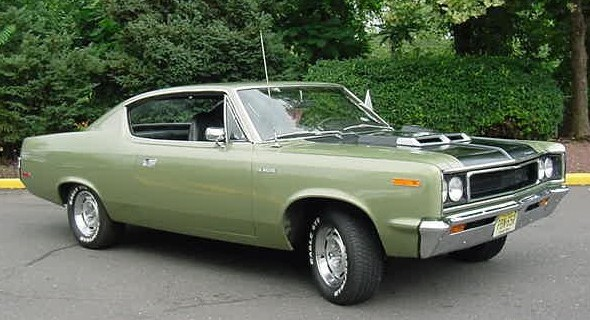
The Machine with standard paint scheme

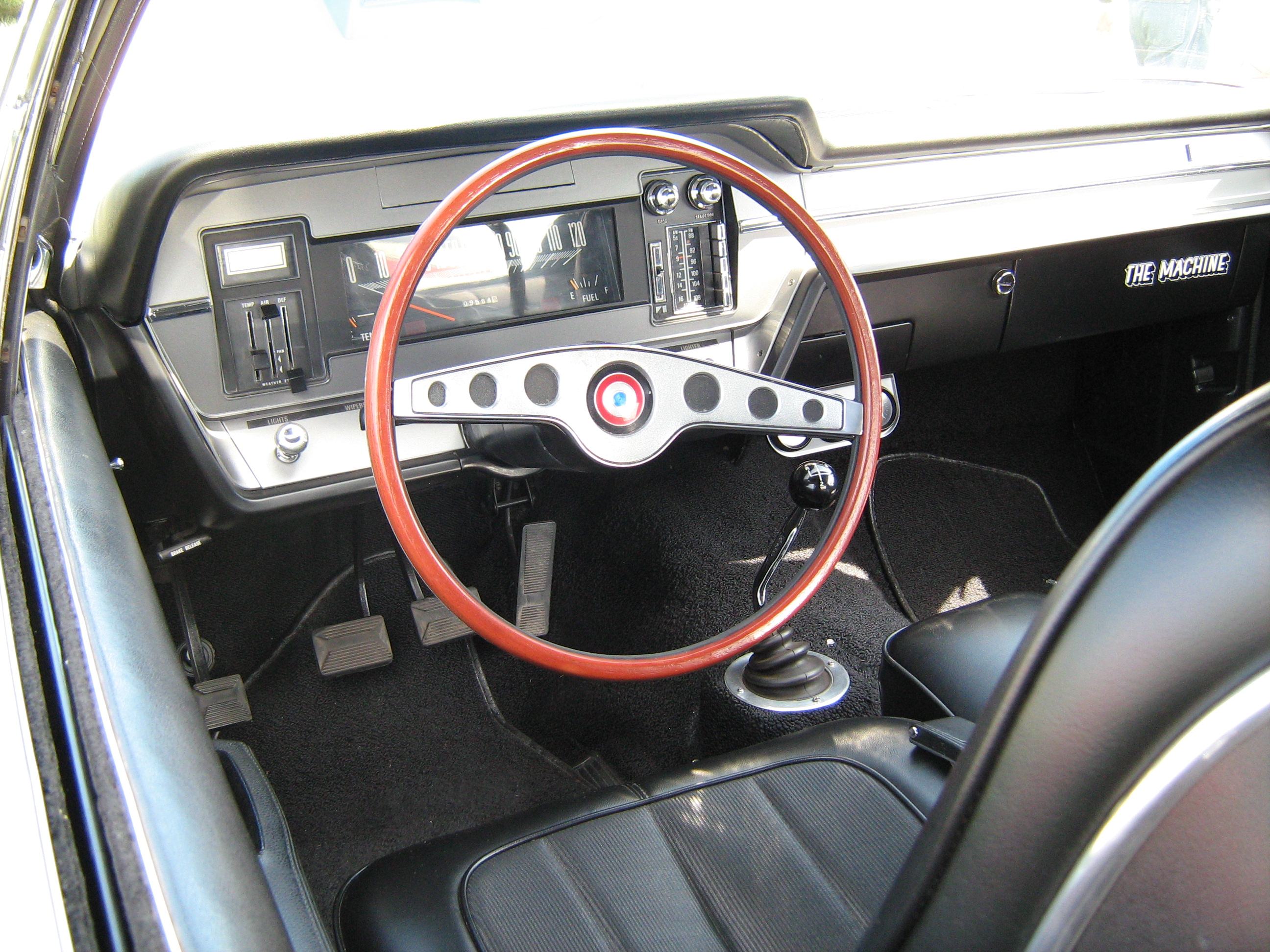
The Machine standard interior

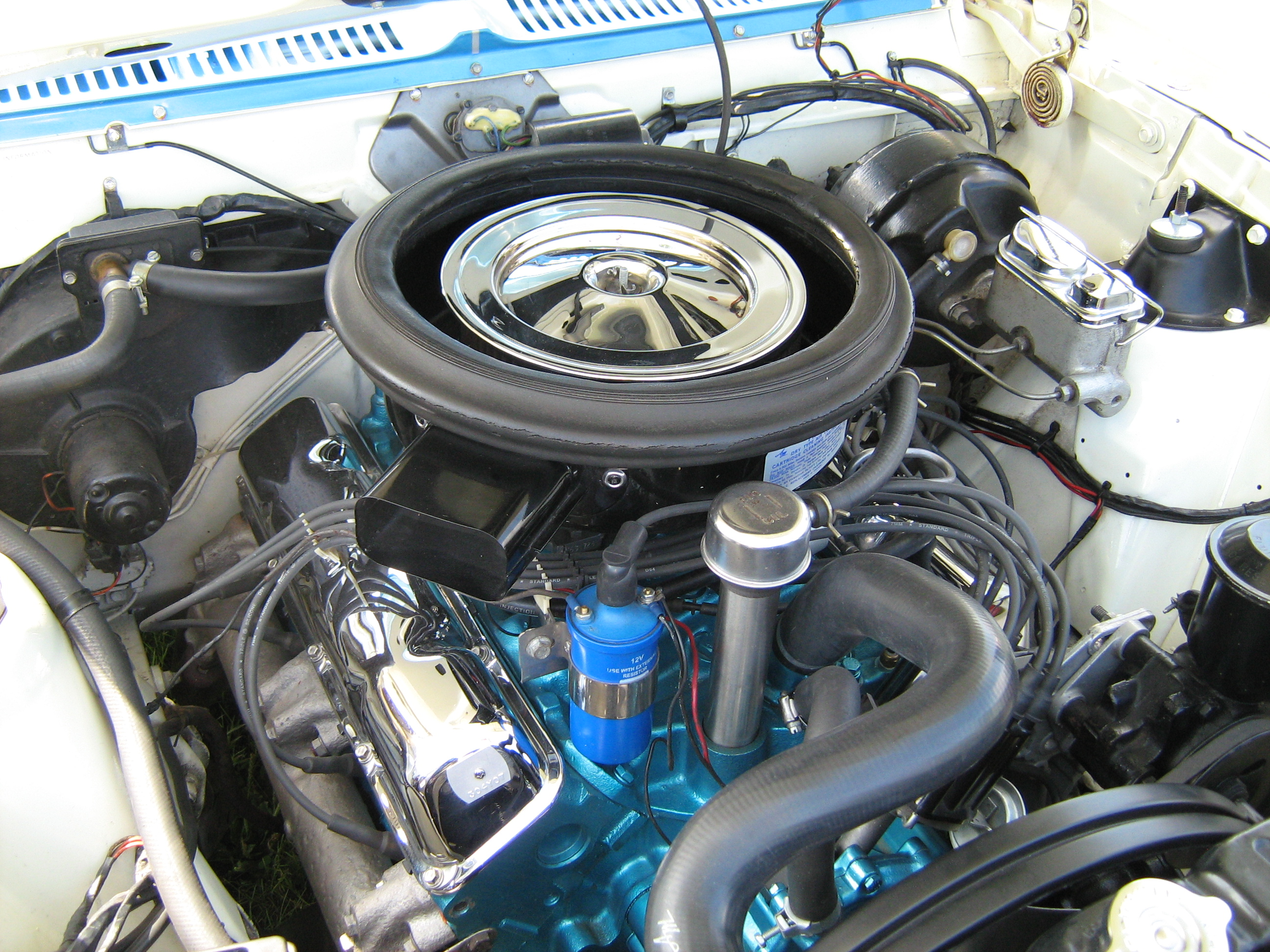
The standard Machine engine

=== Machine wheels ===
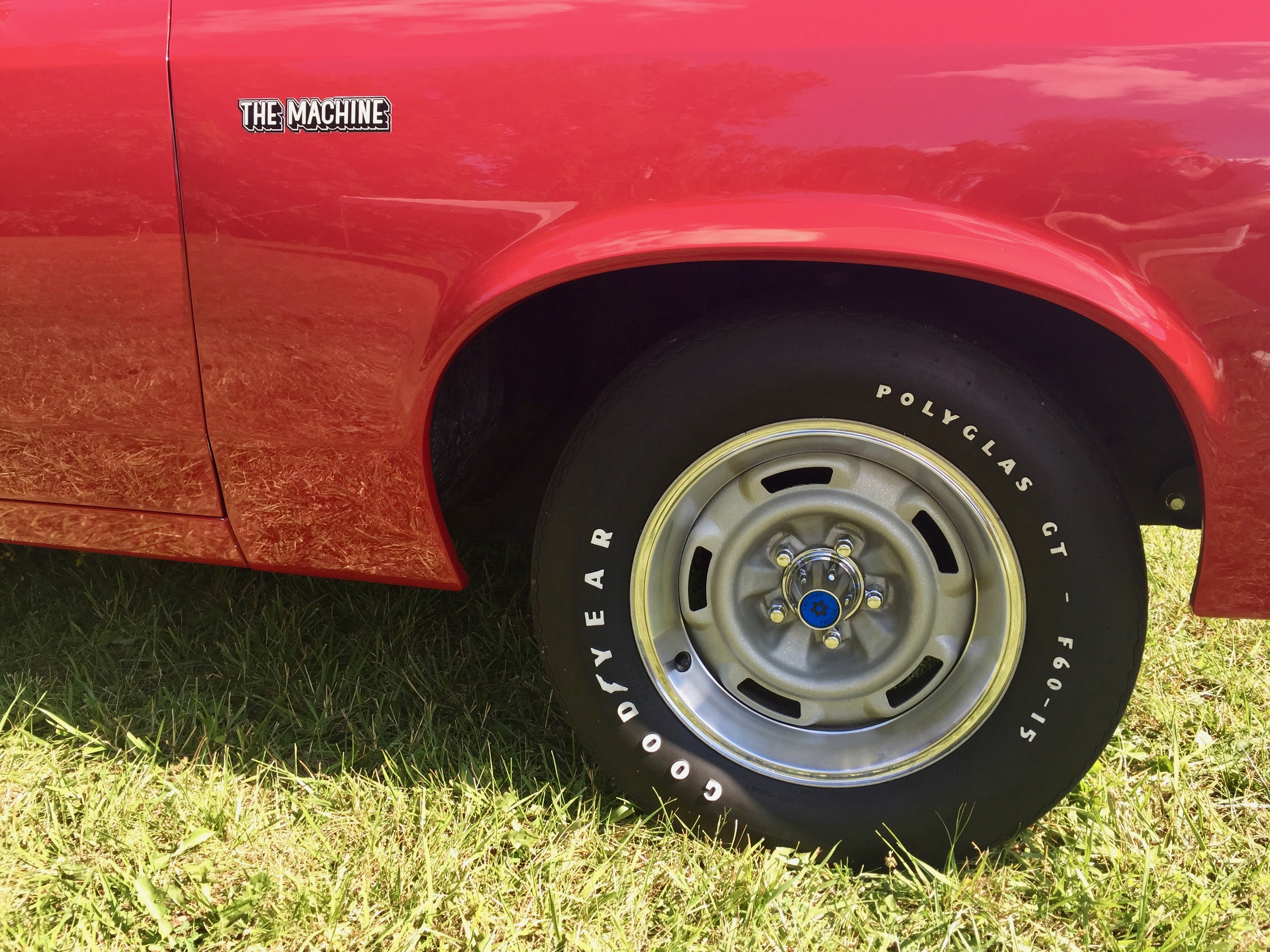
The Machine road wheel

Among its standard performance features, all The Machine models included a special set of wheels with the appearance of a cast alloy wheel. The steel wheels were painted in silver metal flake with a rough texture. AMC described them as "15-inch styled road wheels" in brochures and catalogs. Enthusiasts call them "Machine wheels". They came with a chrome center cap adorned with a blue trim disc featuring a gear icon in the center and the words American Motors around it. The 15-inch (381 mm) by 7-inch (178 mm) wheels were made by Kelsey-Hayes. They have five narrow cooling slots positioned atop risers stamped around the center of the wheel. The trim ring is unusual because it does not overlap the rim (to allow for attaching wheel balancing weights), and it is permanently press-fit.

The "Machine" wheels were also optional on the 1970 AMX and Javelin models through the 1972 model year, as well as part of the "Go-Package" on 1971 and 1972 Javelin AMXs, after which a more conventional 15x7-inch slotted steel rally wheel replaced it.

=== Marketing ===
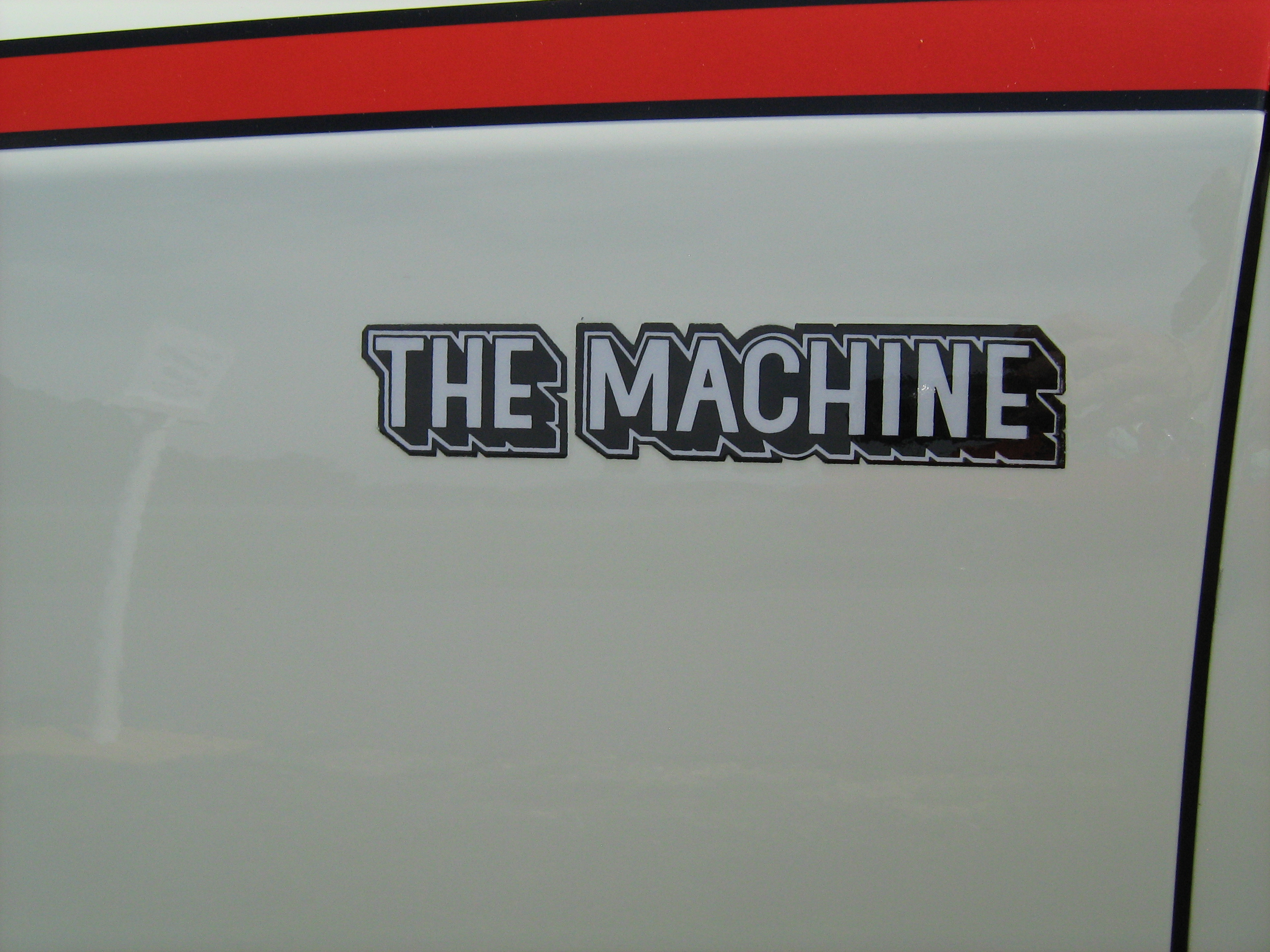
The Machine front fender emblem

Advertisements in magazines such as Hot Rod teased that The Machine is not as fast as a 427 cu in (7.0 L) Chevrolet Corvette or a Chrysler Hemi engine, but it will beat a "Volkswagen, a slow freight train, or your old man's Cadillac. Numerous upgrades were standard to make each Machine a potent turnkey drag racer. In contrast to the lack of options on the SC/Rambler, Machine buyers could order numerous extras from the factory. These included substituting the manual for a center console-mounted "pistol grip" automatic transmission for $188, adding cruise control cost $60, an adjustable tilting steering wheel cost $45, and even air conditioning was available for an additional $380. Furthermore, American Motors dealers sold numerous performance parts over the counter, such as an incredibly steep 5.00:1 gearing "for hardcore drag-racer types." An optional "service kit" for $500.00 increased horsepower to well over 400 hp (298 kW; 406 PS) and lowered its quarter-mile drag strip times from 14.4 with the factory Autolite carburetor (and standard rear-wheel hop behavior at maximum acceleration from standing) to 12.72 seconds.

American Motors Vice-president for Sales, Bill Pickett, described the Rebel Machine as "another youth-oriented car." The company explained "the supercar buyer is usually young, relatively affluent and has a "critical awareness" of exterior styling. At the same time, he wants to be treated as an individual and stand out from the crowd. The Rebel Machine's distinctive paint job, rakish nose-down attitude, and obvious performance characteristics lets the supercar buyer express his identity, or, in the words of today, 'Do your own thing'. Being different from the crowd today does not necessarily mean being against something, but rather in reinforcing certain specific ideas. We anticipate that the Machine will identify with this new brand of rebel, who demonstrates for something." The automaker claimed in its marketing promotion that "The Machine is not that fast," but that the car was capable of "giving many muscle cars from the big three (General Motors, Ford, and Chrysler) a run for their money". According to a retrospective Motor Trend article, The Machine is the most strip-ready car of the group they tested. The Machine could accelerate from 0 to 60 miles per hour in 6.4 seconds. The Machine's top speed was 127 mph (204 km/h).

The manufacturer's suggested retail price (MSRP) price was $3,475 (US$28,809 in 2015 dollars). After the initial run of 1,000 units with its distinctive and easily recognizable identity, The Machine was available without the stripes in other colors with a blacked-out hood. The unique paint scheme for the Machine is Frost White with a flat-black hood (paint codes: 72A-8A), with only three made. Another exclusive version came in "Big Bad Green", with at least three made and possibly only one known factory-documented original car remaining. The original trim scheme became a $75 option. There were a total of 2,326 Rebel Machines built in 1970. With the Machine, "AMC had acquired a reputation for the ability to create eye-catching, high-performance machines at a knock-down price."

According to the former editor of Motor Trend magazine, before BMW took "The Ultimate Driving Machine" moniker for itself, American Motors dubbed the high-performance model that could hold its head high in fast company simply "The Machine", and it deserves to be considered among the Greatest Cars of All Time.

The 'Machine' option was offered again as a package for the 1971 re-styled Rebel that was renamed to Matador.

== Convertibles ==
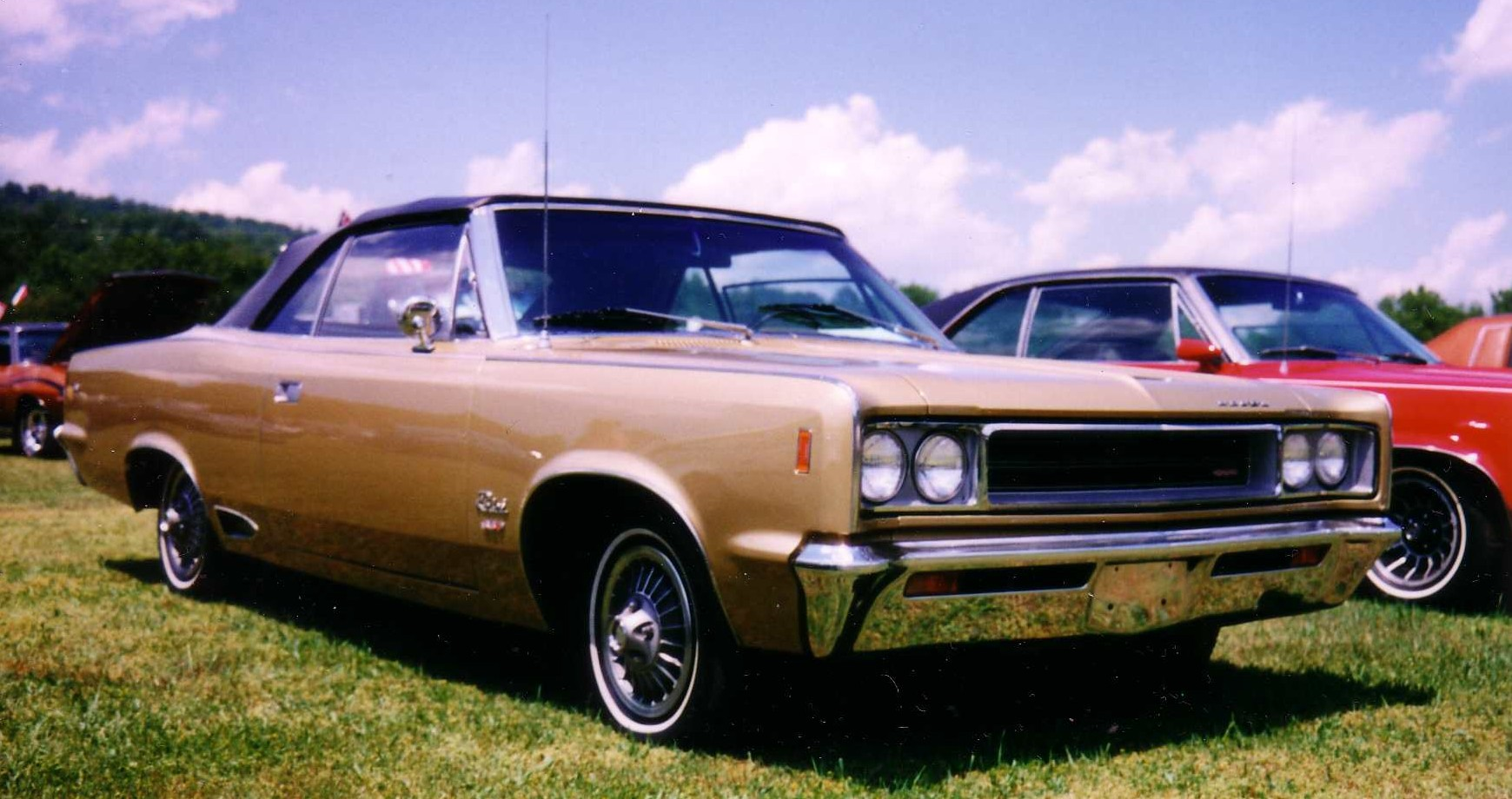
1968 Rebel SST convertible

During the 1967 model year, American Motors produced a total of 1,686 Rambler Rebel convertibles; all in the top-trim SST model. Automatic power operation of the top was standard. The new convertible top design featured a "streamlined" look blending smoothly with the lower body with the top-up. Its new "split stack" folding mechanism also allowed a lower stack height with the top folded down, as well as for a full-width backseat with room for three passengers.

For 1968, the Rambler name was dropped and two convertible versions were offered in the Rebel line. A total of 1,200 were produced (823 in the SST version and 377 units in the base 550 model). Since convertibles in the Rambler American and Ambassador series were dropped after 1967, the 1968 Rebels were the only open models built by AMC. This was also the last year for AMC convertibles until this body style was added to the compact Renault Alliance in 1985.

== Other markets ==
The AMC Rebel was produced under several business ventures in foreign markets. In these markets, "the Rebel was still the epitome of the modern mass-produced US sedan."

=== Australia ===
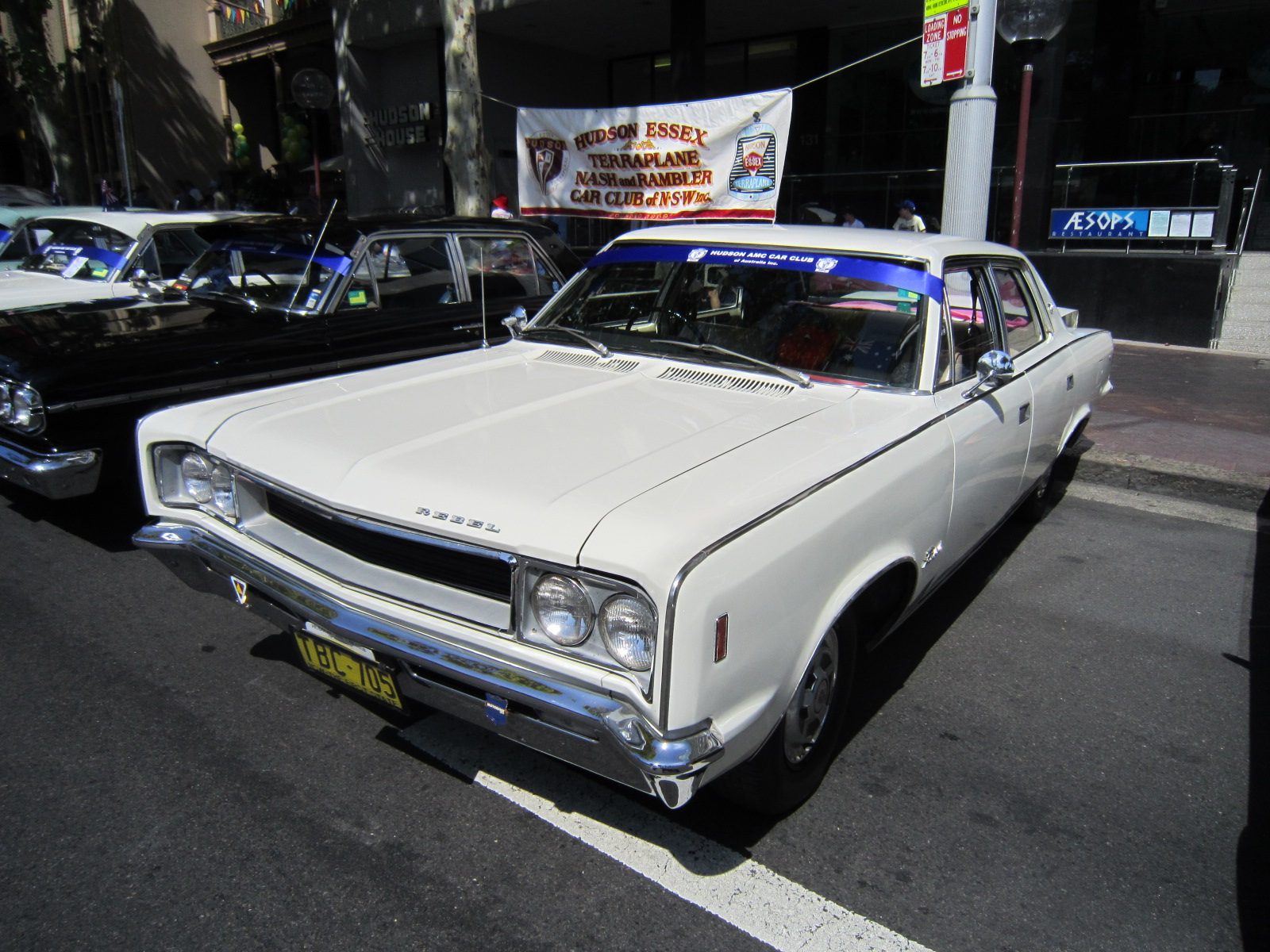
1968 Rambler Rebel assembled in Australia with right-hand drive

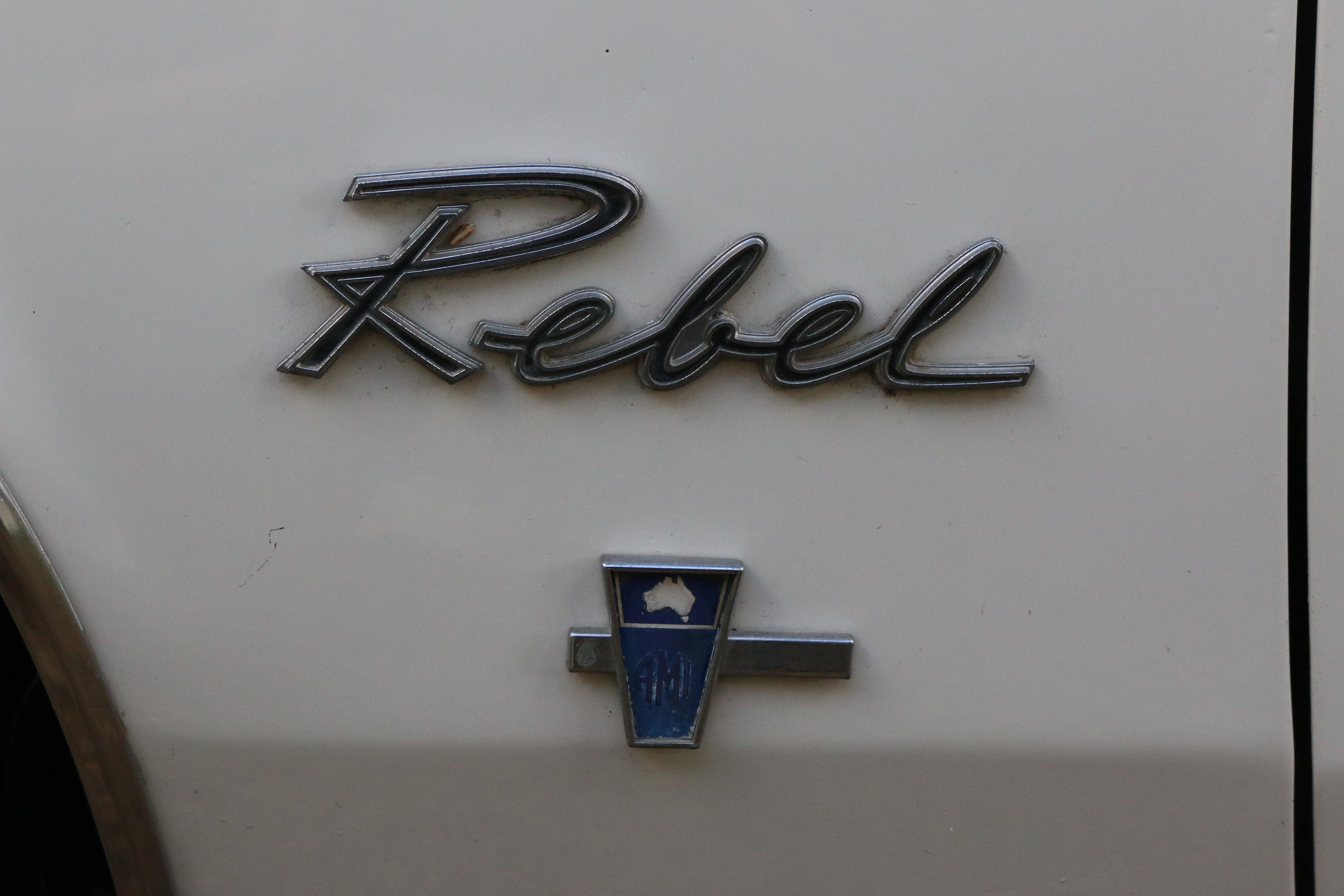
The standard AMI badge replaced U.S. trim level badging on all Australian-built Rebels

Australian Motor Industries (AMI) in Port Melbourne, Victoria had been assembling AMC vehicles since 1960. Rebel four-door sedans and station wagons were assembled from Semi-Knock-Down (SKD) imported to Australia. The cars had right-hand drive (RHD) and were partially built with the engine, transmission, front suspension, rear axle, and doors installed in Kenosha, Wisconsin. Other parts were boxed and shipped inside the car for the final assembly in Australia.

The RHD Rebel dashes used in all export markets were a mirror of the 1967 Ambassador dash and two-dial instrument pack rather than the North American dash and rectangular speedometer. This RHD dash and cluster had originally been used by AMC for the RHD Ambassadors they assembled for the United States Postal Service during 1967 and was used thereafter in all RHD-market Rebels and Matadors.

The World Forum for Harmonization of Vehicle Regulations (1958) and Australian Design Rules (first published in 1969) permitted only amber-color rear direction turn signals on Australian motor vehicles with four wheels, thus red-color turn signals and combination brake/turn signals were prohibited in Australia. Therefore, Rebel sedans up to 1970 had amber lenses fitted to their trunk lids, wired as combination turn signal/backup lights. 1970 models received an amber-colored plastic overlay affixed to the backup lens of the tail lights. Rebel station wagons had amber add-on lights fitted into the tailgate.

Also in Australia, numerous other parts and components such as brakes, seats, carpets, lights, heaters, etc. were sourced locally to gain tariff concessions. As AMI also assembled Toyota vehicles, some parts used on the AMI Rebels were sourced from Toyota.

For the 1970 model, all the Australian Rebels came with AMC's new 360 cu in (5.9 L) V8 engine and Borg-Warner 3-speed automatic transmission.

When AMC discontinued the Rebel after 1970, Australia continued to assemble the 1970 model through to October 1971, when it was replaced by the AMC Matador sedan.

Two-door variants of the Rebel were not marketed in Australia.

Trim-level badging differed from U.S. models. The standard AMI logo was fitted where otherwise the trim level badging was meant to go on the front fenders. For the 1970 model, the "Rebel" fender badge was dropped altogether, and instead, a "Rambler" script badge was fitted at the very front of the fenders under the side marker light lens. Since the AMI badge took the spot of the engine size badge, the "360" badges were moved to the rear fenders.

Registrations of Australian-assembled Rebels were:

- 1967: 864 sedans, 132 wagons
- 1968: 601 sedans, 114 wagons
- 1969: 561 sedans, 109 wagons
- 1970: 345 sedans, 71 wagons
- 1971: 307 sedans. A mix of Rebel and Matador wagons for a total of 64 cars were registered in 1971.

Both the Rebel and the subsequent Matador were sold in Australia under the Rambler marque, despite AMC discontinuing the use of the Rambler name from the 1968 model year. The Matador was marketed in Australia until 1977.

AMI also acted as the State distributor for Ramblers for Victoria. Rambler sales for New South Wales were managed by Sydney company Grenville Motors Pty Ltd, which was also the State distributor of Rover and Land Rover. A network of Sydney and country NSW dealers were controlled by Grenville which was in direct communication with AMI. Australian Capital Territory sales were managed by Betterview Pty Ltd in Canberra. Annand & Thompson Pty Ltd in Brisbane distributed Rambler vehicles for Queensland. South Australian sales were managed by Champions Pty Ltd in Adelaide. Premier Motors Pty Ltd in Perth distributed Ramblers for Western Australia, and Heathco Motors in Launceston distributed Rambler vehicles for Tasmania.

=== Costa Rica ===
Rebels were assembled in Costa Rica from Knock-down kits by Purdy Motor in San Jose. Purdy Motor acquired the franchise rights to market American Motors vehicles in 1959 and imported complete cars to Costa Rica, but it was not until 1964 that Costa Rican laws permitted the local assembly of vehicles. Purdy Motor built an assembly plant in 1965 and the first locally manufactured Rambler was a 1964 Rambler Classic 660 which came off the line in late 1965. The all-new 1967 Rebel was assembled to production end, followed by its replacement, the Matador from 1971. Purdy Motor assembled AMC vehicles until 1974 when it sold its rights to another company.

As with other export markets, the Rebel was marketed in Costa Rica under the Rambler marque even after the marque was retired by AMC in its home market after 1969.

=== Finland ===
Ramblers were imported into Finland by two major Finnish automotive importers, Oy Voimavaunu Ab and Suomen Maanvilelijäin Kauppa Oy (SMK Group) during the 1950s and 1960s. From the mid-1960s, Wihuri Group, a large multi-sector family business, took over import operations using its shipping operation, Autola Oy. Wihuri brought in the Rebel and Ambassador models and went on to import small numbers of other AMC vehicles until 1975.

=== France (and Europe) ===
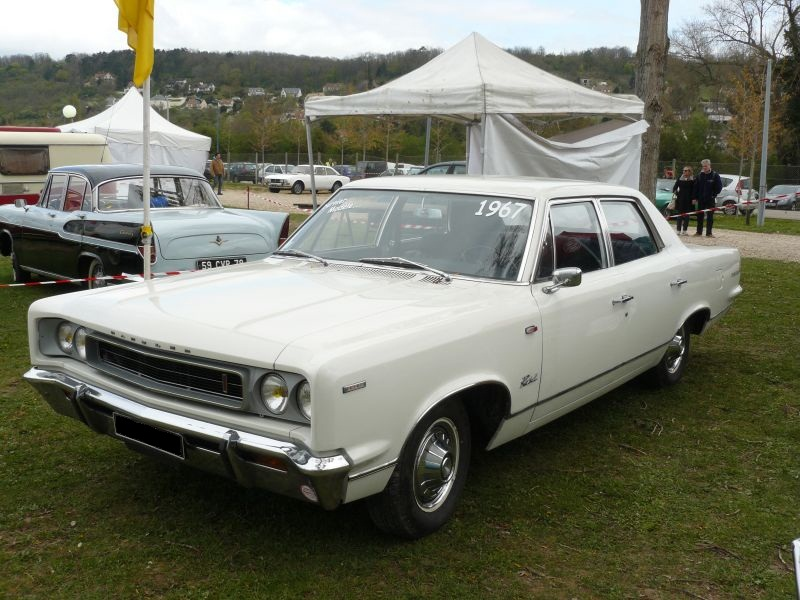
1967 Renault Rambler Rebel sedan

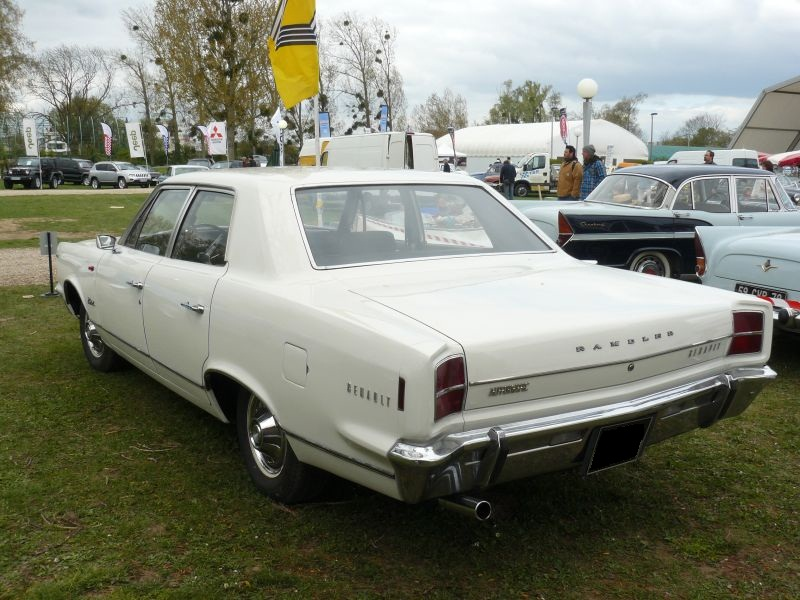
1967 Renault Rambler Rebel sedan (rear view)

Under a partnership agreement developed in 1961 with French automobile manufacturer Renault, American Motors vehicles were assembled in Renault's plant in Haren, Belgium from Complete Knock-down kits. The new 1967 Rebel was marketed as the Rambler Renault as had been its locally-assembled predecessor, the Rambler Classic. The model was available in France as both sedan and hardtop models and was also sold through Renault dealers in Algeria, Austria, Belgium, Netherlands, and Luxembourg.

The Rambler models served as the executive car in Renault's product line, but the entirely new design was a larger car with more power than the previous Rambler Classic and no longer suitable for European automobile tax regimes or road conditions. The 1967 models were priced 20 to 25% more than the previous year's; therefore, production ended in summer 1967.

No further AMC vehicles were assembled by Renault after the 1967 Rebel. However, business operations between AMC and Renault continued in Argentina via Industrias Kaiser Argentina (IKA), which Renault took control of in 1967. IKA had been assembling Ramblers under a partnership arrangement with AMC since 1962. Under the new three-way partnership, IKA continued to build AMC models, including the Rambler Ambassador until 1972. Renault bought out IKA in 1970, and the Santa Isabel factory of Córdoba was renamed Renault Argentina in 1975.

=== Germany ===
In 1969, American Motors struck a deal with the importer and distributor of Jaguar and Aston Martin cars for the Federal Republic of Germany, Peter Lindner GmbH of Frankfurt am Main to be the exclusive importer of AMC cars for West Germany. Peter Lindner offered seven AMC models including the Rebel.

=== Mexico ===
American Motors had partial ownership of Vehiculos Automotores Mexicanos (VAM) and the Mexican operation produced equivalent AMC Rebel models. Mexican regulations required VAM vehicles to have at least 60% locally sourced parts. The large-sized VAM cars in only two body styles, a two-door hardtop called the Rambler Classic SST, and a four-door sedan called the Rambler Classic 770 under license from 1967 through 1970, with no other trim levels or model designations available. The car was VAM's entry into the luxury segment of the Mexican auto market in contrast with its other lines that focused on economy. The VAM Classic represented the company's flagship model, a positioning that in the United States was held by the AMC Ambassador models.

In addition to different model names and marketing concepts, the Mexican versions also adapted AMC I6 engines to local conditions. They also came with more upscale interiors compared their counterpart models marketed in the United States and Canada. The standard engine was the 155 hp (116 kW; 157 PS) 232 cu in (3.8 L) I6 with two-barrel carburetor from 1967 through 1969, even though the Rambler Classic SST had the option of VAM's own 252 cu in (4.1 L) I6 early in 1969, which became standard equipment several months late in the year. Since 1970, both versions were equipped with VAM's 170 hp (127 kW; 172 PS) 252 cu in (4.1 L) I6 with two-barrel Carter carburetor, 9.5:1 compression ratio and 266 camshaft from the factory. The cars were restricted to a three-speed manual transmission in 1967 and 1968, but were available with an optional column-mounted three-speed automatic starting in 1969, making the Rambler Classic the second regular production VAM to offer an automatic transmission after the Javelin the year before. Rear gear ratios included a 3.73:1 for 1967 and a 3.54:1 for the remainder of the run. External cosmetic changes over the years in VAM Rambler Classics were mostly the same as in the U.S. and Canadian market Rebels.

Both VAM Rebel-based Rambler Classics included almost the same equipment between the two body styles with only a few exceptions. The largest difference was in the front seats. The Classic 770 came with a full-width bench seat while the Classic SST had individually adjustable units, even though some of the hardtops came with a front bench. The standard features included flow-through ventilation, front door flip-open air vents, four-wheel drum brakes, rigid four-bladed cooling fan, day-night rearview mirror, two-speed electric wipers, electric washers, luxury steering wheel, electric clock, 200 km/h speedometer, cigarette lighter, front ashtray, AM Motorola radio with antenna, locking glove box, courtesy lights, dual rear ashtrays, four side armrests, front two-point seatbelts, dual coat hooks, dual dome lights on C-pillars (except 1969–1970 sedan), single dome light on headliner (1969–1970 sedan only), fold-down armrest integrated to the rear seatback, bright molding package, luxury wheel covers, back-up lights, turn lights, and driver's side remote mirror. Optional equipment for both models included power drum brakes (standard with automatic transmission), power steering, automatic transmission (not available in 1967 and 1968), remote-controlled driver and passenger outside mirrors, heater with front defroster, rubber-faced bumper guards, bumper tubes, and a locking gas cap, among others. Sales of the two-door hardtop body style declined in 1970.

The Rebel-based Rambler Classic models in Mexico were not available as two-door sedans, two-door convertibles, or four-door station wagons. The Rebel Machine was also not available under VAM, although a similar model was made available in 1972 in the form of the VAM Classic Brougham hardtop.

=== New Zealand ===
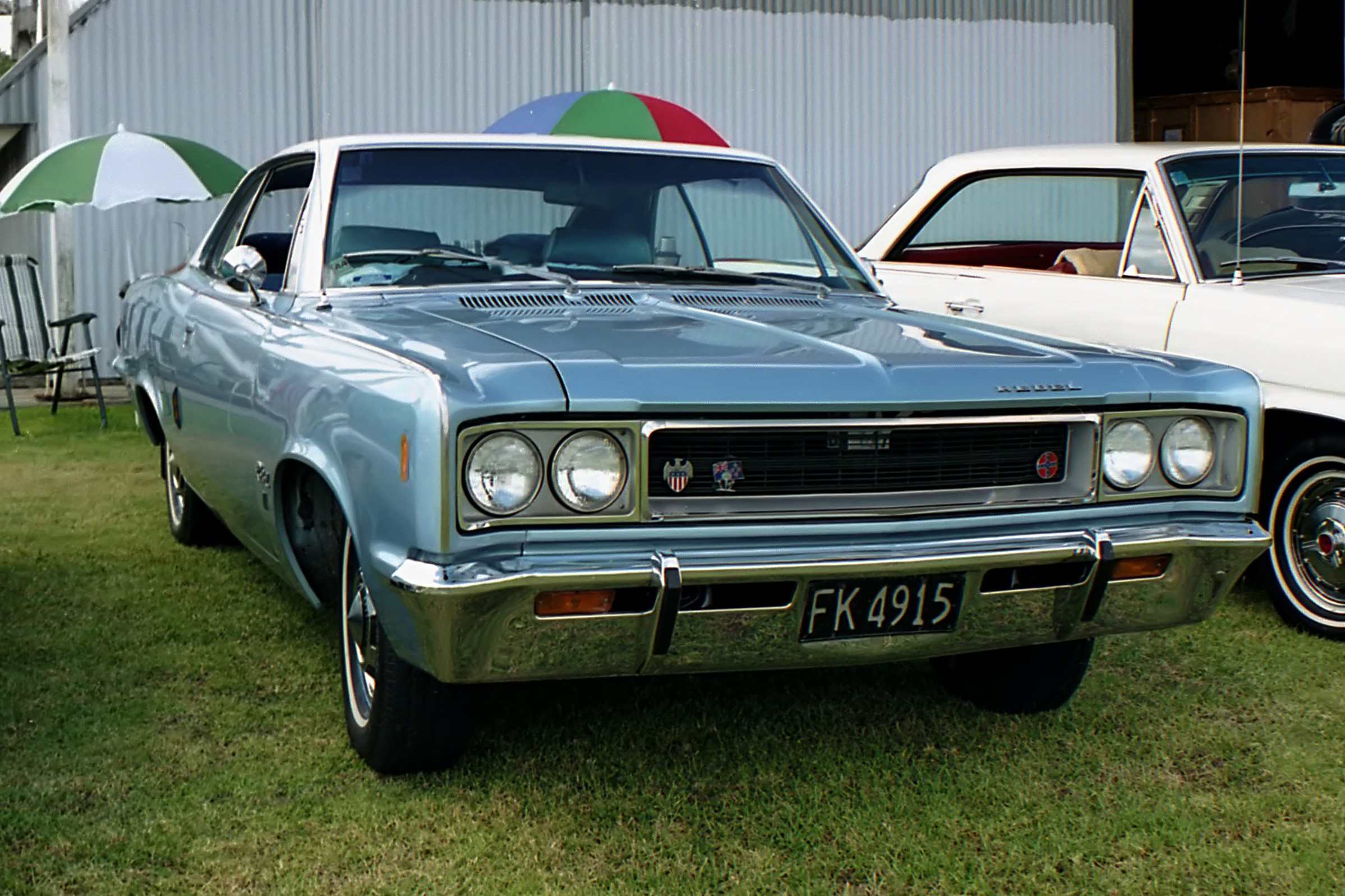
1968 New Zealand-market import Rebel 2-door

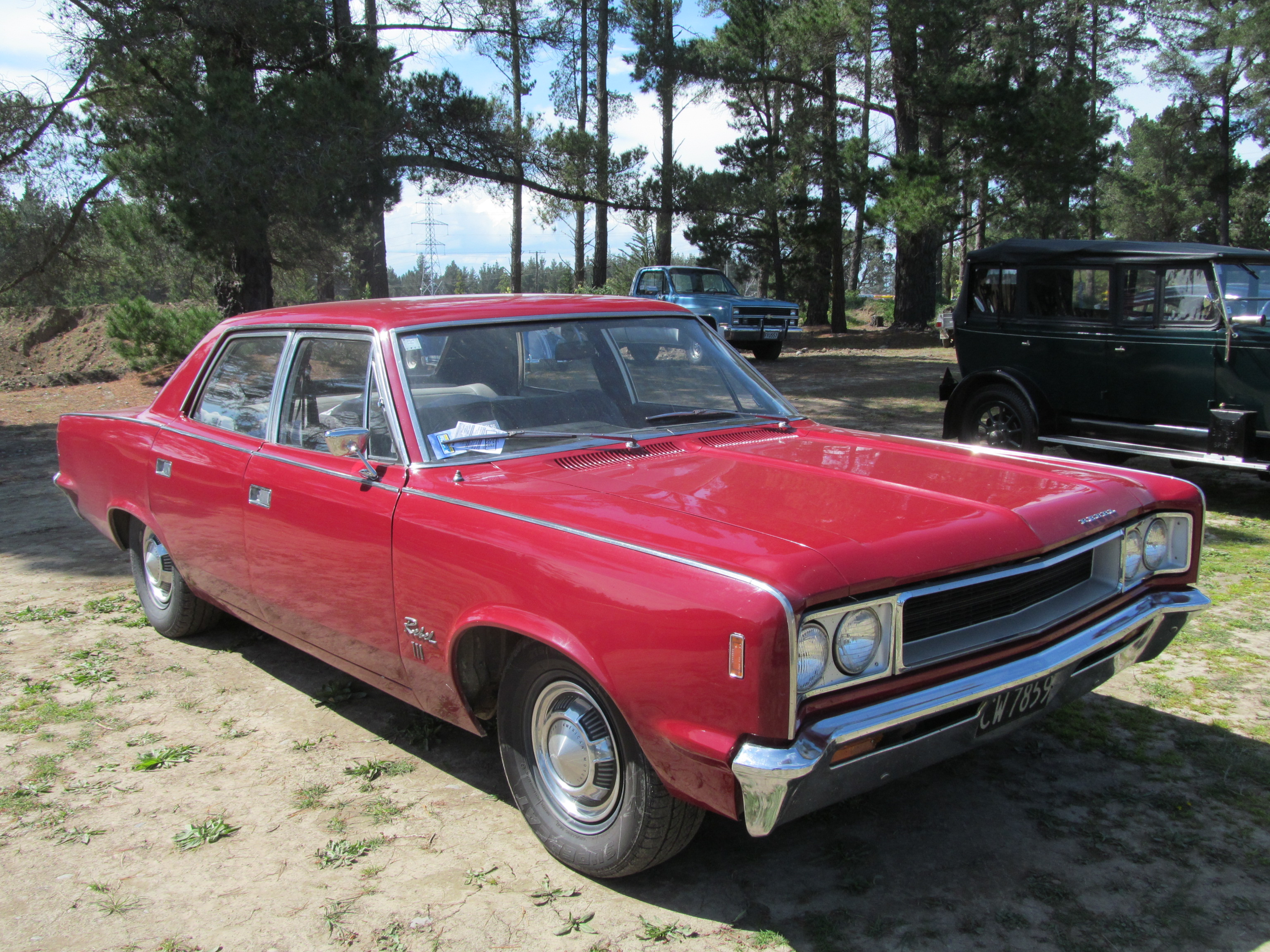
NZ-assembled 1969 Rambler Rebel 770, the US 1968 version assembled in 1969

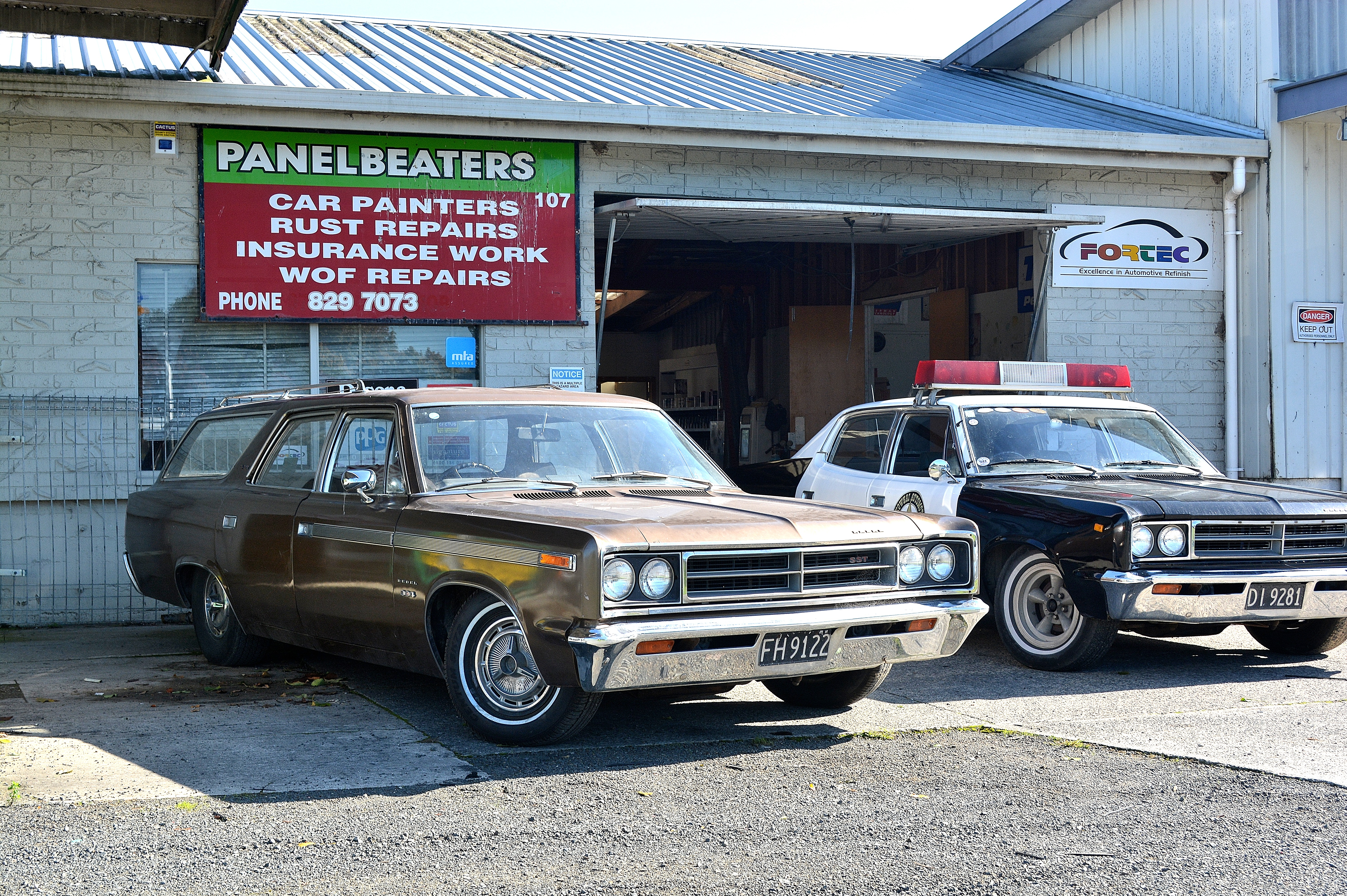
Two NZ 1970 Rambler Rebels. The wagon was imported in factory RHD, and the sedan was locally assembled

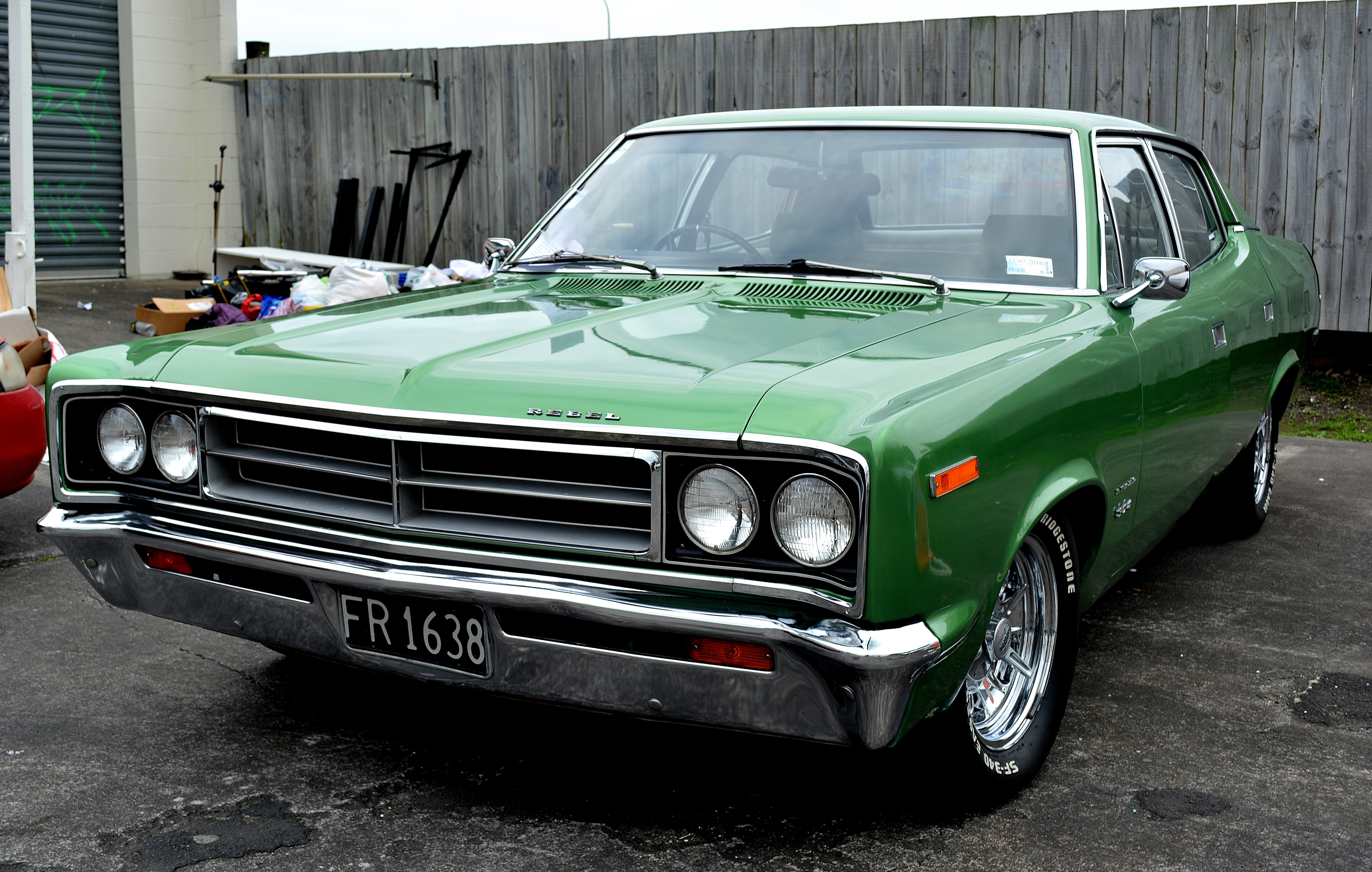
1970 Rambler Rebel assembled in New Zealand in 1971

Right-hand drive four-door Rebel sedans were assembled by Campbell Motor Industries (CMI) in Thames, New Zealand, from semi-knock-down kits sourced from Kenosha. CMI's parent company, Campbell Motors also imported Complete Built-Up (CBU) factory-RHD Rebel station wagons and RHD Rebel hardtops directly from AMC.

As with Australia, the sedans were built at the AMC plant with right-hand drive controls, engine, transmission, front suspension, rear axle, and doors already installed. Other parts were boxed and shipped inside the car for the final assembly in New Zealand, including seats and interior trim. AMC supplied only three interior colors for the NZ kits: green, blue, and brown. Unlike Australia, New Zealand models were painted in original AMC colors. As with all RHD market models, the dash and instrument pack from the right-hand drive Ambassador built for the United States Postal Service in 1967 was reused for all model years.

All New Zealand-assembled Rebels came with AMC's 232 cu in (3.8 L) six-cylinder engine until the 1970 models.

While the knock-down kits were the same as those used in Australia, New Zealand models were more "American" than the Australian models, as Australian laws required more local content for tariff concessions. For example, New Zealand models came with U.S. seats, door cards, and sun visors, whereas these components were all locally supplied on Australian models. New Zealand Rebels also shared the same amber park/direction indicator lenses as U.S. models whereas Australian-built ones were fitted with clear lenses. Australian law prohibited the use of rear red combination brake/direction indicators, whereas these were allowed in New Zealand.

For the 1969 model year, New Zealand did not receive Rebel sedan knock-down kits from AMC; CMI simply assembled the 1968 model again for 1969, but included an upgraded custom-built walnut veneer dash and cluster surround sourced from the United Kingdom. Conversely, the imported 1969 station wagons and coupes were true 1969 models.

1970 was the first year the New Zealand-assembled Rebels received a V8 engine. These cars included AMC's 304 cu in (5.0 L) V8 engine with automatic transmission. Whereas the Rebel ceased production at the end of 1970 in North America, CMI continued to assemble the 1970 Rebel into early 1971. The last Rebels were sold as late as 1972. External colors for 1970 were AMC's "Hialeah Yellow", "Mosport Green", "Bayshore Blue", "Frost White", and "Moroccan brown." The 1970 models omitted the 1970-only aluminum body side molding trim; however, the cars that were assembled in 1971 were fitted with the strip. The 1970 Rebel sedan sold for NZD 6,429.00.

Unike Australian-assembled Rebels which featured no trim level badgng, New Zealand-assembled Rebels were badged with "770" on the 1969 models and featured "SST" badging for the imported coupes and the V8-equipped station wagons. The 1970 models retained the U.S.-version "Rebel" fender badge with the "304" badge directly below it.

CMI assembled a total of 590 Rebel sedans, and an additional 177 station wagons and hardtops were fully imported. Registrations of NZ Rebels (including the U.S.-built imports) were:

- 1967: 228
- 1968: 156
- 1969: 136
- 1970: 147
- 1971: 100

=== Norway ===
Ramblers were imported into Norway during the 1950s and 1960s by Norwegian importer Kolberg & Caspary (K&C) located at Ås, Norway. K&C was formed in 1906 and imported automotive, industrial, and construction products. The Rambler Rebel was imported by K&C from 1967 until 1969 for a total of 147 vehicles. Previously the company imported the Rambler Classic, American, and Ambassador.

=== Peru ===
Ramblers were marketed in Peru during the 1960s by Rambler del Peru S.A and sold throughout the country by a network of 13 dealers. In January 1966, Renault and AMC created Industria Automotriz Peruana S.A., located in Lima, to assemble Renault, AMC, and Peugeot vehicles. Production was low for all three brands with AMC vehicles being the highest of the three brands, totaling 750 built between 1966 and 1970, a number that includes the Rambler Rebel. As with all export markets, the AMC Rebel continued to be marketed as "Rambler Rebel" in Peru.

Under President Juan Velasco Alvarado domestic car manufacturing operations underwent changes after 1969 and AMC ceased manufacturing operations in Peru in October 1970.

=== United Kingdom ===
American Motors also exported Rebels in factory right-hand-drive to the United Kingdom. These were marketed by Rambler Motors (A.M.C.) Ltd on Great West Road, Chiswick, West London, and were available from four dealers in London, Yorks, Kent, and Worcester. The Chiswick plant had previously assembled Hudson, Essex, and Terraplane motor vehicles since 1926. The operation became a subsidiary of AMC in 1961 and changed its name to Rambler Motors (A.M.C) Ltd in 1966.

Right-hand-drive Rebel models marketed in the UK during 1967 included the saloon (sedan), SST coupe, and station wagon all in 770 trim. They were promoted as luxury cars priced between £1,900 and 2,500. Models with V8 engines included power steering as standard equipment.

For 1968, Rebel station wagons, SST coupe, and SST convertibles were marketed in the UK alongside the Ambassador saloon (sedan) and Javelin. The distributor in London was Clarke and Simpson Limited and the cars were marketed as "the only American car built with RHD." The Rebel 770 station wagon was available with an I6 or V8 engine.

As had become standard with all right-hand drive markets, U.K. models were built with a right-hand version of the 1967 Rambler Ambassador dash and instrument pack for all model years. Some UK models were additionally fitted with a locally-built plywood instrument cluster fascia with a walnut veneer which included a hinged door for the cavity where otherwise the "Rambler" plate was affixed. The remaining stock woodgrain dash parts were also replaced with a walnut veneer.

Externally, all U.K. models corresponded to those of the U.S. model years.

== Name change ==
After evaluating the situation of social unrest within the U.S. and the model name's associated connotations of rebellion, "American Motors officials decided that it was no time to be selling a car called Rebel." The automaker's marketing department conducted consumer research and determined a name change for the 1971 model year to 'Matador
