= Rambler Classic =

Car model produced by American Motors Corporation

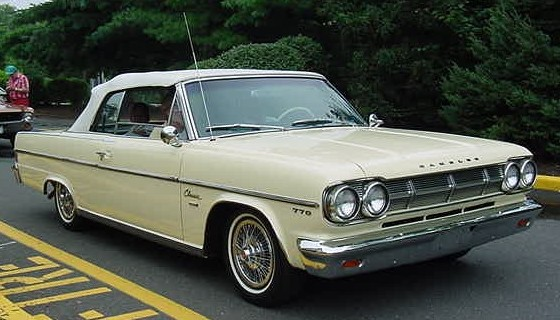
- 1965 Rambler Classic 770 convertible

Overview
- Manufacturer: American Motors Corporation (AMC)
- Also called: Rambler-Renault Classic (RIB)
- Production: 1961–1966
- Assembly: United States: Kenosha, Wisconsin (Kenosha Engine); Argentina: Córdoba Province (IKA); Australia: Port Melbourne (AMI); Belgium: Vilvoorde (RIB); Canada: Brampton, Ontario; Costa Rica: San José (Purdy Motor); Mexico: Mexico City (VAM); New Zealand: Thames (CMI); Philippines: Manila (Luzon Machineries)
- Designer: Dick Teague

Body and chassis
- Class: Mid-size; Executive (E) (Europe)
- Layout: FR layout

Chronology
- Predecessor: Rambler Six and V8
- Successor: Rambler Rebel

The Rambler Classic is an intermediate-sized automobile built and marketed by American Motors Corporation (AMC) from the 1961 through 1966 model years in three generations.

The 1961 Classic line replaced the Rambler Six and Rambler Rebel V8 names, which were retired at the end of the 1960 model year.

Initially available as a six-passenger four-door sedan and six- or eight-passenger station wagon versions, AMC added body styles to the model line. Two-door variants became available as a "post" sedan for the 1963 model year, and starting the 1964 versions, a pillar-less hardtop. A convertible was also available for the 1965 and 1966 model years.

Motor Trend magazine selected AMC's Classic line for the 1963 Car of the Year award.

The Rebel name replaced Classic on AMC's entirely redesigned intermediate-sized cars for the 1967 model year. For 1968, the Rambler Rebel line was renamed the AMC Rebel as AMC began phasing out the Rambler marque.

Throughout its production, the Classic was a high-volume seller for the independent automaker. Built in AMC's factories in the U.S. and Canada, the Classic was assembled under license or joint ventures and exported to over 100 nations.

== First generation ==
First generation
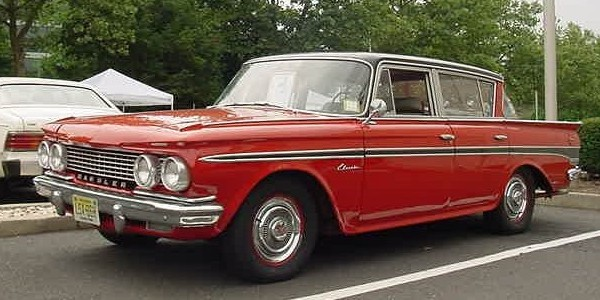
- 1961 Rambler Classic 4-door sedan

Overview
- Production: 1961–1962
- Designer: Edmund E. Anderson

Body and chassis
- Body style: 2-door sedan; 4-door sedan; 4-door station wagon

Powertrain
- Engine: 195.6 cu in (3.2 L) I6; 250 cu in (4.1 L) V8 (1961)
- Transmission: 3-speed manual; 3-speed with overdrive; 3-speed automatic

Dimensions
- Wheelbase: 108 in (2,743 mm)
- Length: 189.8 in (4,821 mm)
- Width: 72.4 in (1,839 mm)
- Height: 57.3 in (1,455 mm)
- Curb weight: 2,915 lb (1,322 kg) I6; 3,255 lb (1,476 kg) V8

The Rambler line of cars was the focus of AMC's management strategy under the leadership of George W. Romney. Their compact cars (for the era) helped AMC to achieve sales and corporate profit successes. In 1961, the Rambler marque ranked in third place among domestic automobile sales behind Chevrolet and Ford.

Ramblers were available in two sizes and built on different automobile platforms. The larger-sized Rambler series was based on a 1956 design and was renamed the Classic for the 1961 model year to help create a stronger individual identity and contrast from the smaller Rambler American line. American Motors' Edmund E. Anderson designed the new 108-inch (2,743 mm) wheelbase Ramblers "that looked new and fresh but were in fact inexpensive reskinned models." American Motors kept the basic body shell longer than the big three domestic automakers to recoup tooling costs and make a profit. Because this cycle time of five to six years was longer than the industry norm of three years at that time, AMC designers facelift to provide the appearance of updated styling changes.

=== 1961 ===
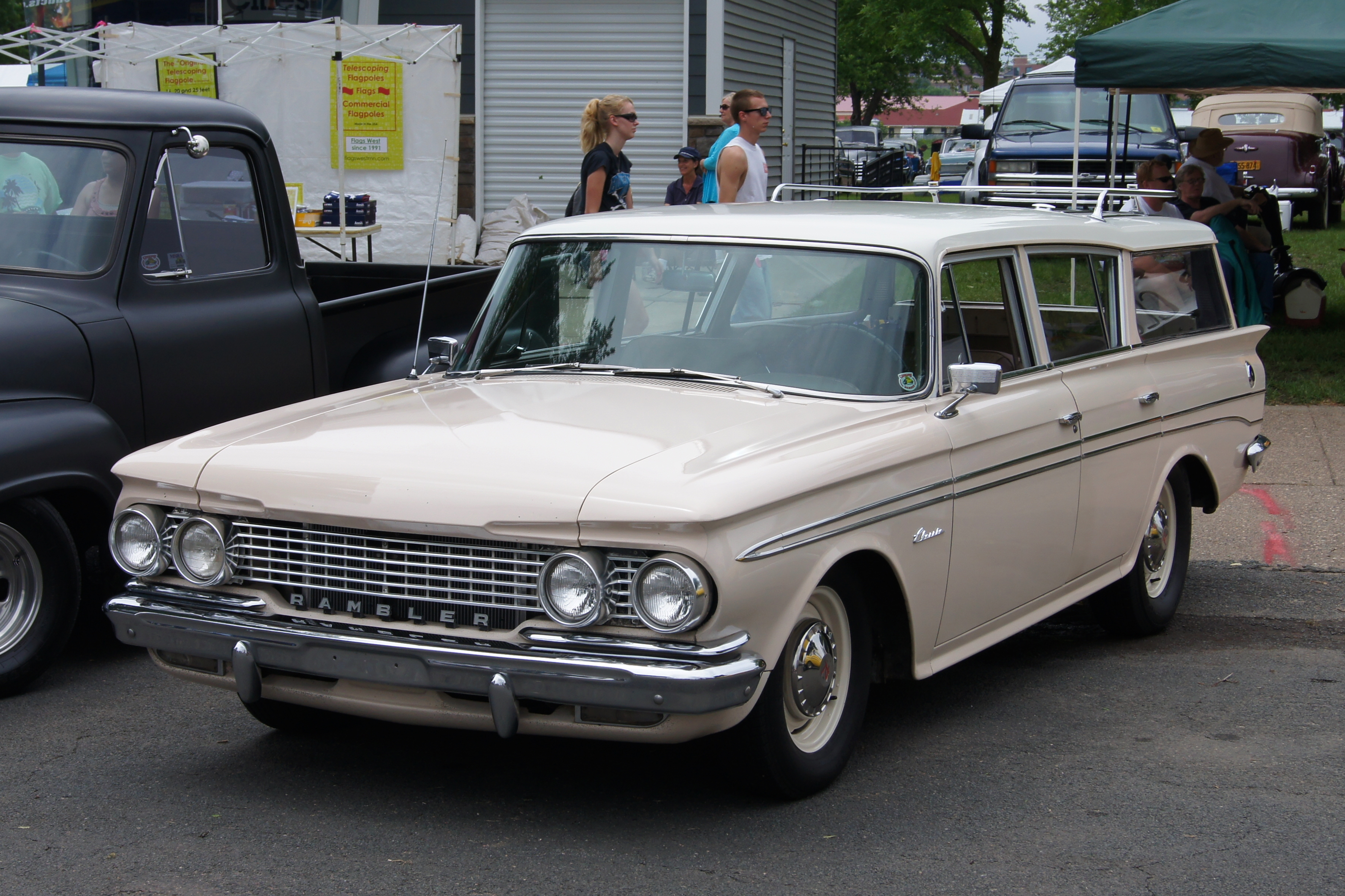
1961 Rambler Classic Cross Country

The new 1961 Classic 6 and V8 models went on display in Rambler showrooms on 12 October 1960. They filled the mid-range in AMC's line of compacts and offered as a six-passenger four-door sedan and as a station wagon with two rows of seats and drop-down tailgate or an optional rear-facing third-row seat and side opening fifth door. They continued the body of the previous Rambler Six and V8, but featured a new front end with a one-piece, rectangular extruded aluminum grille, and new fenders, hood, sculptured door panels, and side trim, as well as redesigned one-piece bumpers.

Trim and equipment levels started from the basic, called the Deluxe, to the mid-level Super, and the top-of-the-line Custom, which featured bucket seats in a four-door sedan. The suggested retail price for the basic Deluxe four-door sedan was US$2,098 and was only $339 more for a station wagon.

In 1961, the Classic was available in either an I6 - 195.6 cu in (3.2 L) - or with a V8 - 250 cu in (4.1 L) - engine. A lighter by 80 pounds (36 kg) aluminum block version of the OHV I6 engine, sometimes referred to as the 196, was offered as an option in the Deluxe and Super models. The die cast block features iron "sleeves" or cylinder liners with a cast iron alloy cylinder head and produces the same 127.5 horsepower (95 kW) as the cast iron version. The engine was described as one "wave of the future" in automotive engineering as it points the way to higher production rates and lower costs.

The 1961 Classics were promoted as "The All-Purpose Compact Car" even though it was roomier and larger than the Rambler American models. Romney signed advertisements and sales literature as "The New World Standard Of Basic Excellence." The 1961 Rambler Classic models "became popular with many older drivers who enjoyed their performance, fuel economy, and great automatic transmission." American Motors "defied the detractors" with its emphasis on economical and compact-sized cars achieving a sales total of 370,600 vehicles in 1961, "lifting the Rambler to an unprecedented third place in the charts behind Chevrolet and Ford".

=== 1962 ===
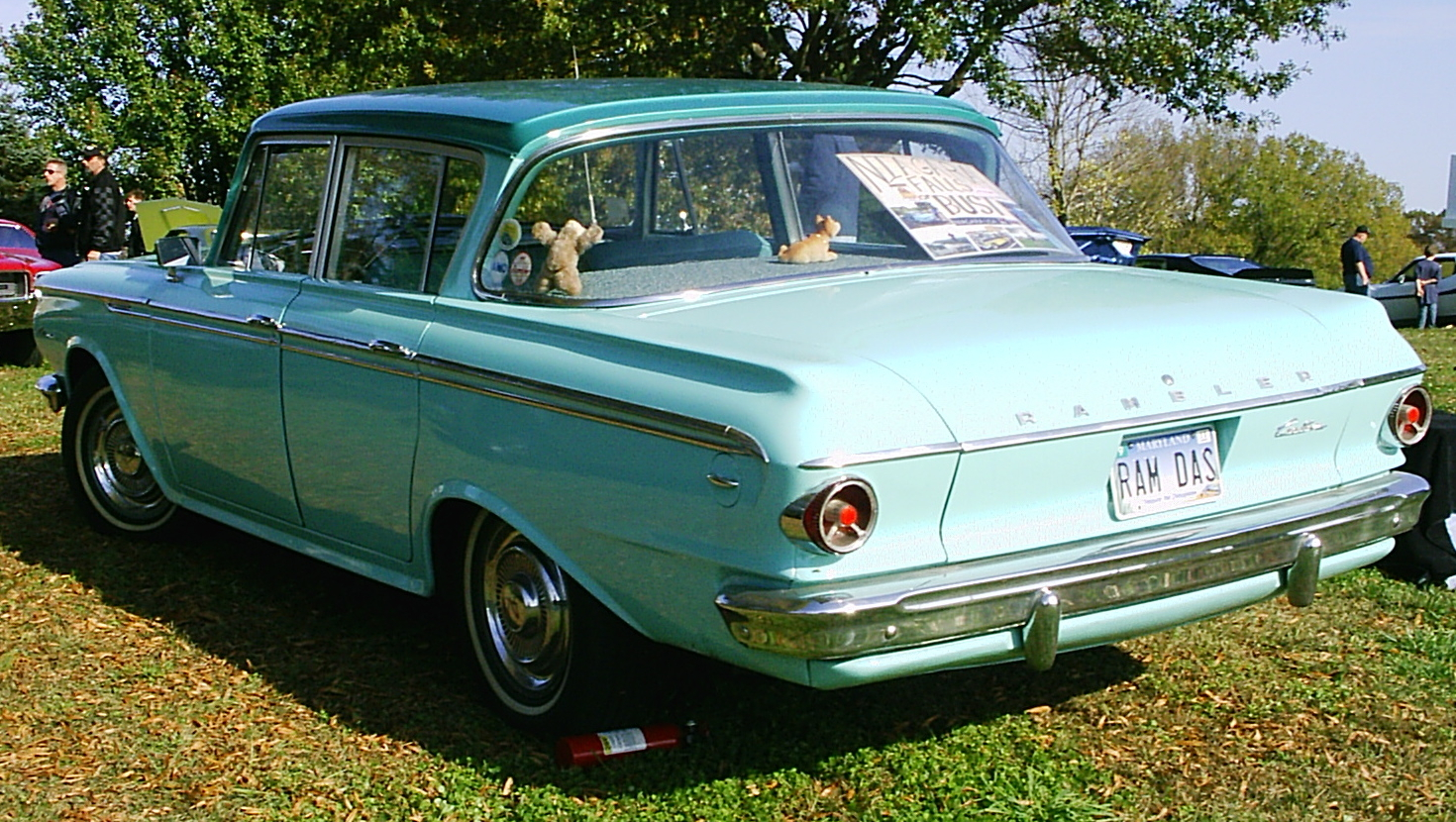
1962 Rambler Classic 4-door sedan

For the 1962 model year, the Super models were dropped and replaced by a 400 model. Also, for 1962, AMC's flagship Ambassador models were shortened to the same 108-inch (2,700 mm) wheelbase as the Classic's at the same time as the V8 engine was no longer available in the Classic models. This meant the Ambassador models were the only models with V8s in the AMC lineup. The two-door sedan body style Rambler Classic was a unique one-year offering for 1962.

The front grille was modified for 1962, but the free-standing Rambler lettering in the lower center remained. The revised rear end received new round tail lamps and the previous year's tailfins were "shaved off". Rambler was one of the last cars to incorporate the tail fin design. It also became one of the first to "do away with them, and to build clean, simple, uncluttered cars." The back door upper window points were also rounded off for 1962.

Starting in 1962, AMC took a leadership role with safer brake systems in all Ramblers featuring twin-circuit brakes, a design offered by only a few cars at that time. Classics with an automatic transmission continued to use push buttons mounted on the left side of the dashboard with a separate sliding pull tab for the "park" position. The cast-iron block six-cylinder engine was standard on Deluxe and Custom models, with the aluminum version optional. The 400 received the aluminum block, but the cast iron was a no-cost option. Other improvements for 1962 included a price cut of $176 on the popular Custom Classic sedan.

1962 added a 5 door wagon with rear facing third seat. All other wagons of the time had a horizontal hinged tailgate instead of a vertical hinged door in the back.

The popularity of the compact-sized Classic continued in the face of a dozen new competitors. Sales of the 1962 model year Classics increased by over 56,000 in the first six months compared to the same period in 1961. A Popular Mechanics nationwide survey of owners that had driven a total of 1,227,553 miles (1,975,555 km) revealed that the Rambler is likable, easy handling, providing stability and comfortable, roomy ride with low-cost operation. Flaws included inadequate power and poor workmanship. The magazine editors also highlighted that the Classic has approximately the same length as most of the other "compact" cars on the market, but its interior room is equal to the new and larger "family-sized" Ford Fairlane and Mercury Meteor.

==== Centaur ====
American Motors highlighted the Rambler Centaur at the 1962 Chicago Auto Show on a raised platform in the center of the automaker's exhibit area. The car was based on a two-door sedan that did "not look remarkably different from regular production models."

== Second generation ==
Second generation
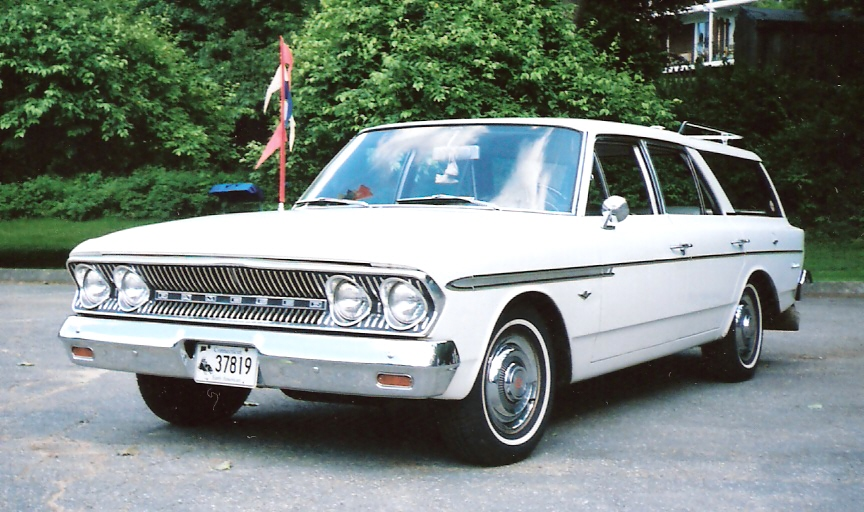
- 1963 Rambler Classic 660 wagon

Overview
- Also called: Rambler Deluxe V8 (Australia); Rambler Luxury V8 (Australia); Rambler Cross Country V8 (Australia)
- Production: 1963–1964
- Assembly: Kenosha, Wisconsin; Córdoba, Argentina (IKA); Port Melbourne, Australia (AMI); Haren, Belgium (Renault); Brampton, Canada; Thames, New Zealand (CMI)
- Designer: Edmund E. Anderson; Dick Teague

Body and chassis
- Body style: 2/4-door sedan; 2-door hardtop (1964); 5-door station wagon

Powertrain
- Engine: 195.6 cu in (3.2 L) I6; 232 cu in (3.8 L) I6 (Typhoon only); 287 cu in (4.7 L) V8
- Transmission: 3-speed manual; 3-speed with overdrive; 3-speed automatic; "E-Stick" 3-speed semi-automatic (1963–1964); "Twin-Stick" on console; 3-speed "Shift-Command" on center console (1964)

Dimensions
- Wheelbase: 112 in (2,845 mm)
- Length: 188.8 in (4,796 mm)
- Width: 71.3 in (1,811 mm)
- Height: 54.6 in (1,387 mm)
- Curb weight: 2,650 lb (1,200 kg) approximate

For the 1963 model year, the Rambler Classic line was completely redesigned with subtle body sculpturing. Outgoing design director, Edmund E. Anderson, shaped the Classic that was named Motor Trend magazine's 1963 "Car of the Year." These were also the first AMC models that were influenced by Dick Teague, the company's new principal designer. He "turned these economical cars into smooth, streamlined beauties with tons of options and V-8 pep."

Being of a suitable size for international markets, this Rambler was assembled in several countries. In Europe, Renault built this car in their Haren, Belgium plant and marketed it as a luxury car, filling the gap above the tiny Renault Dauphine.

The 1963 Classics were also the first all-new cars developed by AMC since 1956. Keeping the philosophy of the company, they were more compact – shorter and narrower by one inch (25 mm), as well as over two inches (56 mm) lower – than the preceding models, but lost none of their "family-sized" passenger room or luggage capacity featuring a longer 112-inch (2,845 mm) wheelbase.

=== 1963 ===
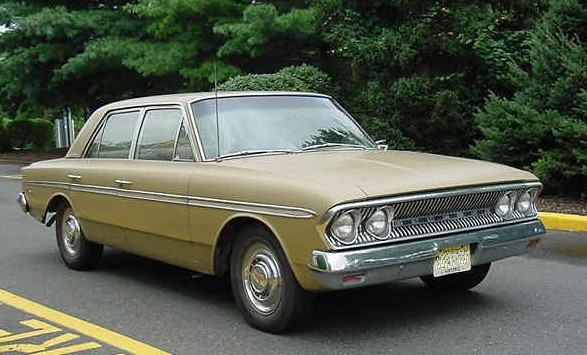
1963 Rambler Classic 770 sedan

American Motors' "senior" cars (Classic and Ambassador) shared the same wheelbase and body parts, with only trim differences and standard equipment levels to distinguish the models. Classics came in pillared two- and four-door sedans, as well as four-door wagons. The model designations now became "a Mercedes-like three-number model designation" of that time, going from the lowest 550 (essentially fleet cars), 660, to the highest 770 trims. These replaced the Deluxe, Custom, and 400 versions)

As in 1962, the 1963 Classics were initially available only as 195.6 cu in (3.2 L) six-cylinder powered models. In addition to higher trim and features, the Ambassador's standard V8 power, featuring AMC's 327 cu in (5.4 L) engine, was a distinguishing feature from the Classic model line. A new "E-Stick" semi-automatic transmission option became available for Classics with the cast-iron I6 engine. Introduced in the smaller American models in 1962, the clutch pedal was eliminated for the standard three-speed manual transmission. Vacuum and electric switches controlled the operation with engine oil pressure as the hydraulic source to actuate the clutch.

In mid-1963, a new 287 cu in (4.7 L) V8 option was announced for the Classic models. The 198 hp (148 kW; 201 PS) V8 equipped Rambler Classics combined good performance with good mileage; even with the optional "Flash-O-Matic" automatic transmission from Borg-Warner, they reached 0 to 60 mph (0 to 97 km/h) in about 10 seconds and returned fuel economy from 16 miles per US gallon (14.7 L/100 km; 19.2 mpg_{‑imp}) to 20 miles per US gallon (11.8 L/100 km; 24.0 mpg_{‑imp}).

The new AMC cars incorporated numerous engineering solutions. Among these was curved side glass, one of the earliest popular-priced cars with this feature. Another engineering breakthrough was combining separate parts in the monocoque (unit construction) body into single stampings. One example was the "uniside" door surround made from a single steel stamping Not only did it replace 52 parts and reduce weight and assembly costs, but it also increased structural rigidity and provided for better fitting of the doors.

American Motors' imaginative engineering prompted Motor Trend magazine to give the Classic – and the similar Ambassador models – their Car of the Year award for 1963. Motor Trend's "award is based on pure progress in design, we like to make sure the car is also worthy of the title in the critical areas of performance, dependability, value, and potential buyer satisfaction."

=== 1964 ===
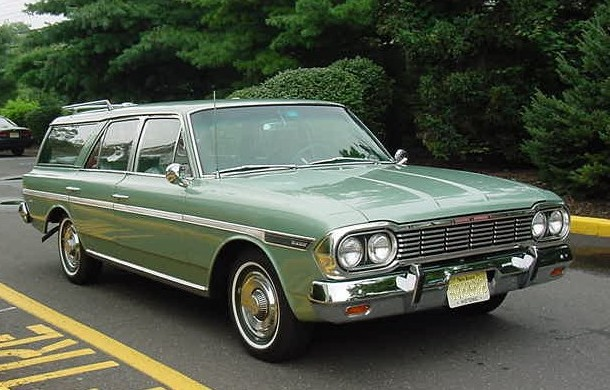
1964 Rambler Classic 770 wagon

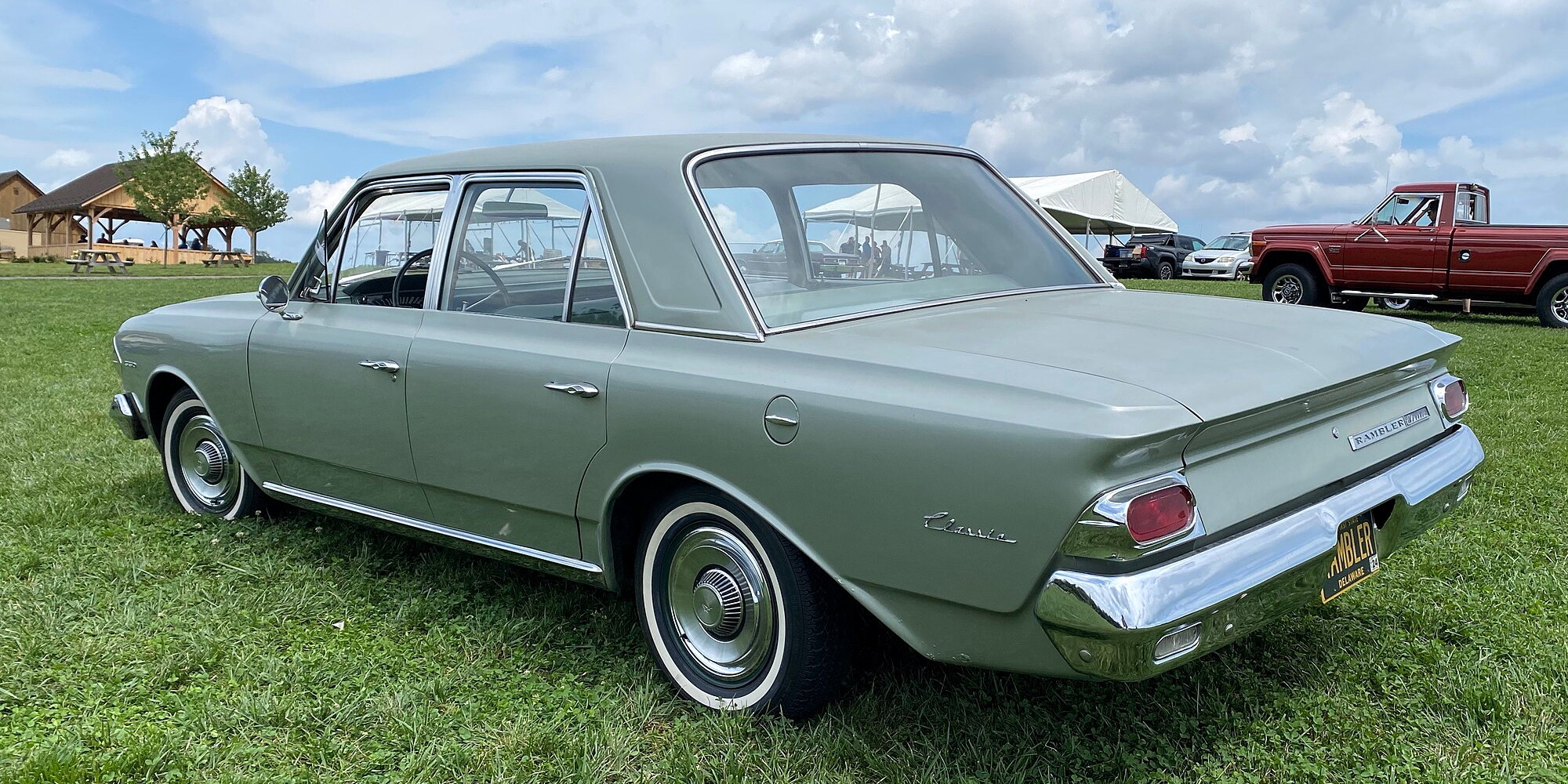
1964 Rambler Classic 550 sedan

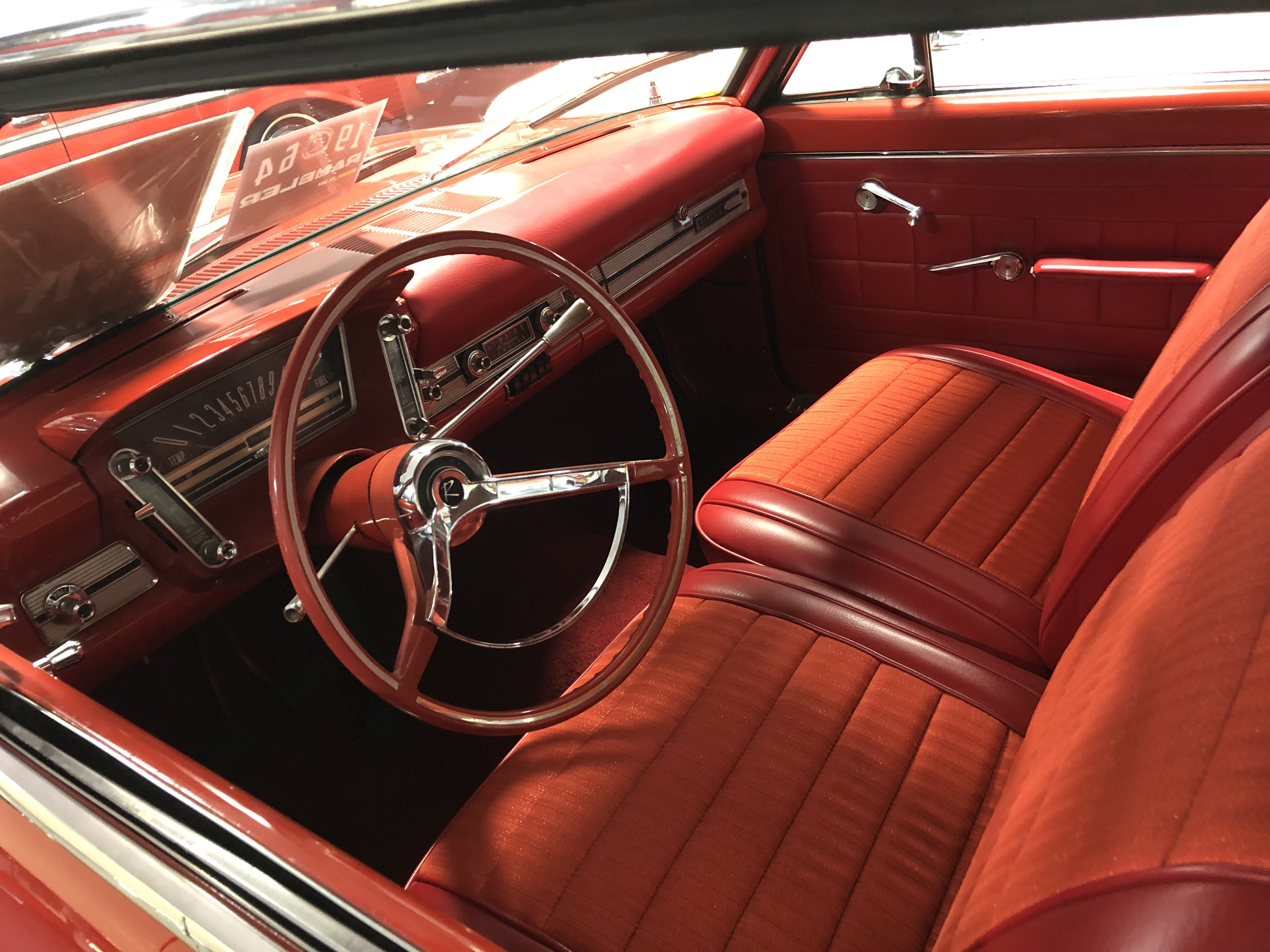
1964 Rambler Classic 770 interior

The 1964 model year Classics were refined with stainless steel rocker moldings, a flush single-plane aluminum grille replacing the previous year's deep concave design, and oval tail lamps replacing the flush-mounted lenses of the 1963s.

Classics with bucket seats and a V8 engine could be ordered with a new "Shift-Command" three-speed automatic transmission mounted on the center console. The design provided the driver the ability to control the automatic's gear shifts manually. The E-Stick three-speed transmission was still available along with an overdrive unit. The system provided greater fuel efficiency compared to the fully-automatic transmissions at that time, but the E-Stick proved unpopular, so it was discontinued after 1964.

A new two-door model joined the line which was only available in the top 770 trim. The pillar-less hardtop offered a large glass area, and "its sales were brisk." The model was featured in AMC's marketing brochure. A sporty 770-H version featured individually adjustable reclining bucket seats, as well as a center console. The new hardtop body style "added flash. Station wagons still accounted for 34 percent of Classic sales."

Consumers continued to perceive Ramblers as economy cars and the six-cylinder models outsold V8-powered versions. Although the Classic had economy-car roots, it offered plenty of space with "clean, unfettered styling that the Sixties brought." American Motors positioned the Classic line to offer near-Chevelle or intermediate-sized proportions with Chevy II small car pricing." Nevertheless, stronger competition from the domestic Big Three automakers meant total Rambler sales dipped in 1964.

==== Typhoon ====
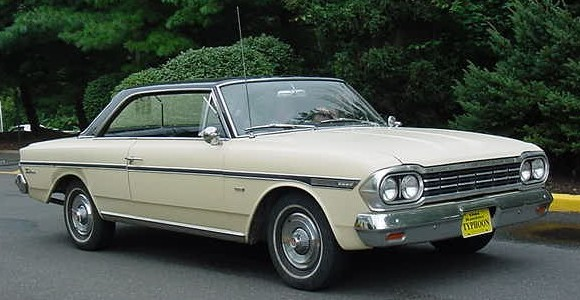
1964 Rambler Typhoon two-door hardtop

American Motors unveiled the Typhoon in April 1964. This mid-1964 model year introduction was a sporty variant of the Classic 770 two-door hardtop. This unique model was introduced to highlight AMC's completely new short-stroke, seven main bearing, 145 hp (108 kW; 147 PS) 8.5:1 compression ratio 232 cu in (3.8 L) "Typhoon" modern era inline-6.

Production of this commemorative model was limited to 2,520 units. It was only available in a two-tone Solar Yellow body with a Classic Black roof and a sports-focused all-vinyl interior with a list price of US$2,509. The car also featured a distinctive "Typhoon" script in place of the usual "Classic" name insignia, as well as a unique grille with blackout accents. All other AMC options (except engine choices and colors) were available on the Typhoon.

The engine became the mainstay six-cylinder engine for AMC and Jeep vehicles. It was produced, albeit in a modified form, up until 2006. The 232 I6 engine's name was soon changed to "Torque Command", with Typhoon to describe AMC's new line of V8s introduced in 1966.

==== Cheyenne ====
American Motors used the 1964 Chicago Auto Show to exhibit the Rambler Cheyenne in a unique rustic viewing area that was made from knotty pine planks. The show car was based on the top-of-the-line Classic Cross Country station wagon finished in white, thus highlighting its full-length gold-tone anodized aluminum trim along the upper part of the bodysides (replacing the side spear that was standard on 770 models) as well as matching gold trim on the lower part of the tailgate between the tail-lights. This was one of AMC's concepts displayed at the Chicago Show that included the Rambler Tarpon fastback and the compact Rambler American Carrousel convertible. Still, the Cheyenne was likely most significant because AMC "did lots of specially trimmed, production-based show cars in its day" given the large number of station wagon models it sold.

== Third generation ==
Third generation
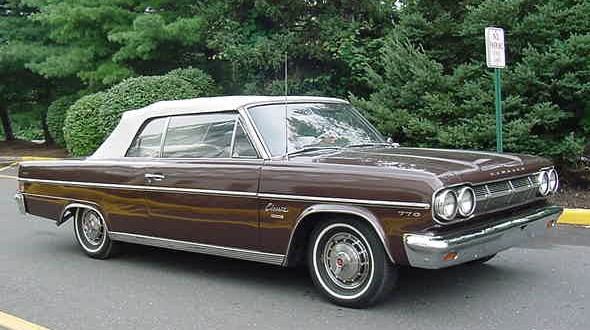
- 1965 Rambler Classic 770 convertible

Overview
- Production: 1965–1966

Body and chassis
- Body style: 2/4-door sedan; 2-door hardtop; 2-door convertible; 4-door station wagon

Powertrain
- Engine: 199 cu in (3.3 L) I6; 232 cu in (3.8 L) I6; 287 cu in (4.7 L) V8; 327 cu in (5.4 L) V8
- Transmission: 3-speed manual; 3-speed with overdrive; "Twin-Stick" on console (1965); 4-speed manual (1966); 3-speed automatic; 3-speed "Shift-Command" on center console

Dimensions
- Wheelbase: 112 in (2,845 mm)
- Length: 195 in (4,953 mm)
- Width: 74.5 in (1,892 mm)
- Height: 55 in (1,397 mm)
- Curb weight: 2,980 lb (1,350 kg) V8 hardtop

The 1965 model year Classics underwent a major redesign of the new platform that was introduced in 1963; essentially the 1963–1964 design with a rectilinear reskin similar to that of concurrent Ambassadors. Fresh sheet metal design was applied to the original 112 in (2,800 mm) wheelbase and 195 in (5,000 mm) long integral body-frame with only the roof, doors, and windshield as carryovers. Unchanged was the suspension system including a torque tube with coil springs with a Panhard rod.

The Rambler Classic was now shorter than – as well as visually distinctive from – the Ambassador line, while still sharing the basic body structure from the windshield back. For the first time, a convertible model was available in the 770-trim version. The two-door sedan was dropped from the 770-model lineup.

=== 1965 ===
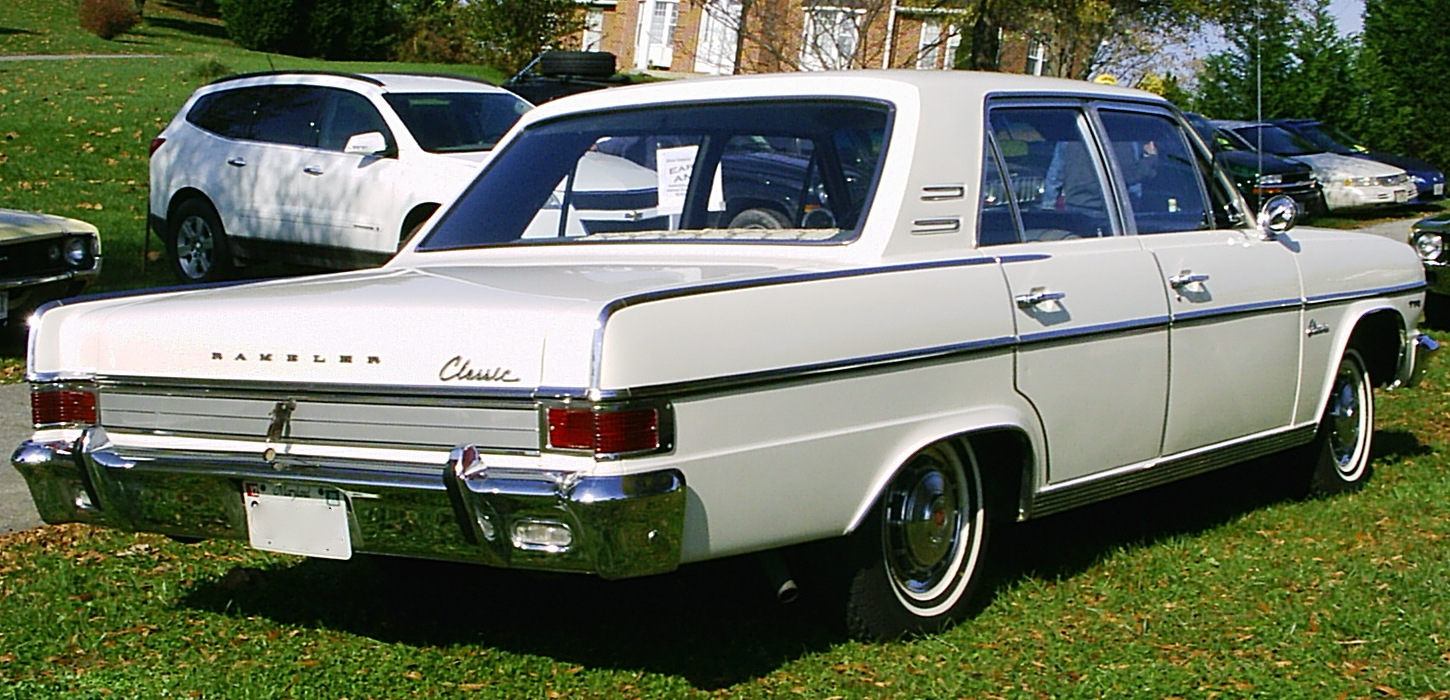
1965 Rambler Classic 770 sedan

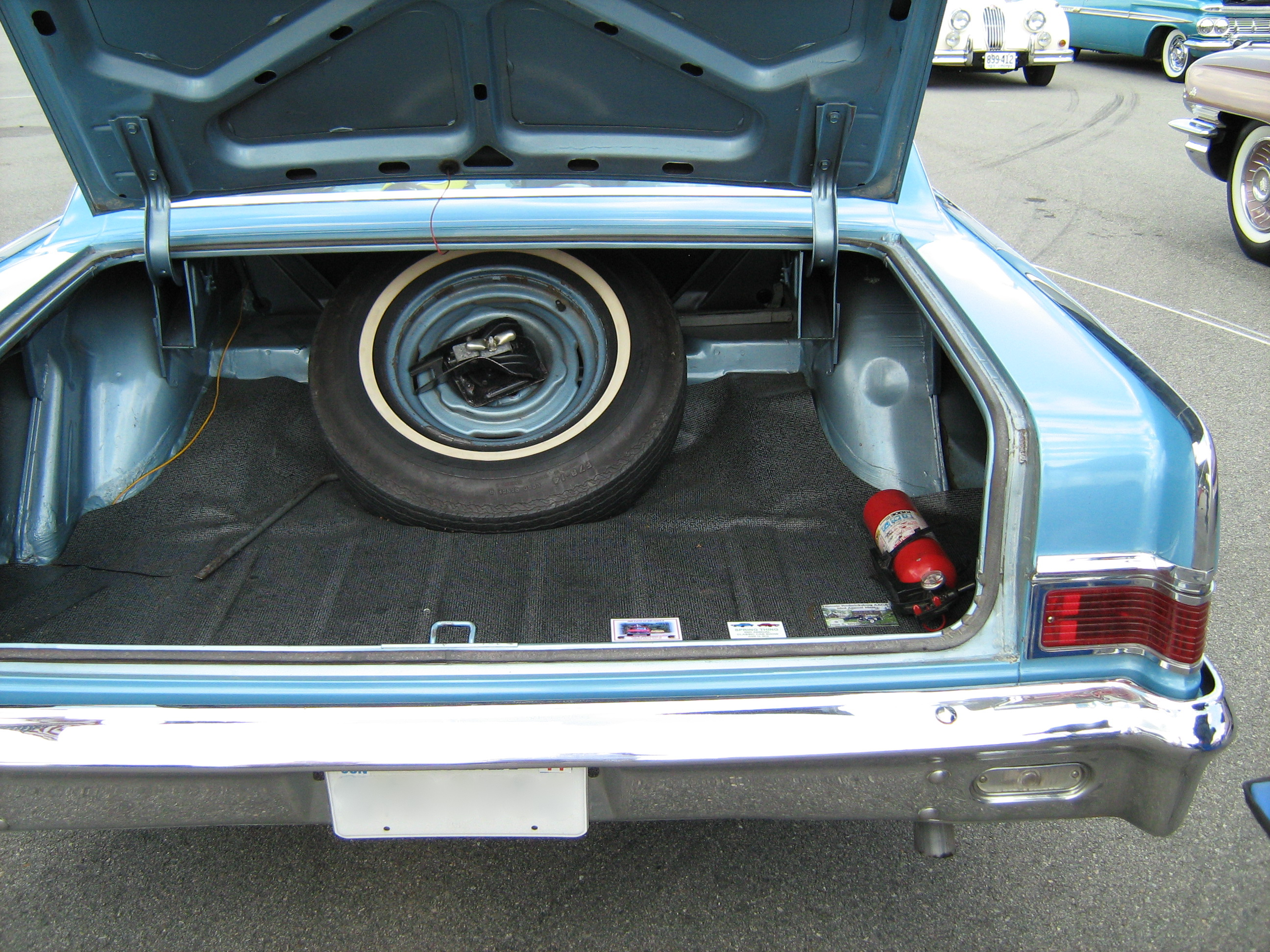
Rambler Classic 660's trunk

The 1965 Classic models were billed as the "Sensible Spectaculars" with brochures proclaiming the "most sweeping changes made by Rambler to its cars. Marketing emphasized their new styling, powerful engines, and expanded comfort and sports-type options, which was in contrast to the previous "economy car" image even though basic low-cost versions of the Classics were available.

American Motors now only offered its modern straight-six engine design, retiring the aging 195.6 cu in (3.2 L) versions. The 1965 Classic base 550 models featured the modern and economical 128 hp (95 kW; 130 PS) 199 cu in (3.3 L) six-cylinder, which was a de-stroked 232 engine. The 660 and 770 series received the 145 hp (108 kW; 147 PS) 232 cu in (3.8 L) six, while a 155 hp (116 kW; 157 PS) version was optional. Additionally, the 198 hp (148 kW; 201 PS) 287 cu in (4.7 L) or 270 hp (201 kW; 274 PS) 327 cu in (5.4 L) V8 engines were optional.

Popular Science magazine reported, "You can have a 1965 Classic as a penny-pinching economy car or a storming performance job." Additional performance options for 1965 included power front disk brakes with four-piston calipers that were supplied by Bendix. The standard 4-wheel drum brakes also continued to feature AMC's "Double-Safety" master cylinder system. The dual master cylinder was available in only one "Big Three" car: Cadillac.

The U.S. automobile market included many competing makes in the mid-size category by the domestic "Big Three" and Studebaker. Similar to "The Common-Sense Car" offered by Studebaker, the design of the Classic did not focus to draw a great deal of attention; however, the models offered sensible features, good trunk space, lots of leg room, and good durability.

==== Marlin ====
On March 1, 1965, during the middle of the model year, AMC introduced the Rambler Marlin, a halo car for the company. The new fastback design used the Rambler Classic platform. Marketed as a personal luxury car, the Marlin had unique styling and featured an exceptional array of standard equipment.

==== Rambler Hialeah ====
A specially prepared Classic two-door hardtop was campaigned for the 1965 auto show circuit. The exterior was finished in yellow pearlescent paint. It was the interior treatment that differentiated the concept car with its yellow and green "Hialeah Plaid" trim. The door panels and bucket seat bolsters were genuine leather while the seats featured yellow and green plaid silk cloth inserts that were woven in Thailand. The same material was also used for the dresses worn by the models that stood by the cars during auto show days. Public reaction to the tartan interior design was favorable. This market study resulted in AMC offering a new large plaid custom fabric upholstery - along with two matching throw pillows - as an option for the 1966 Classic Rebel hardtop model.

=== 1966 ===
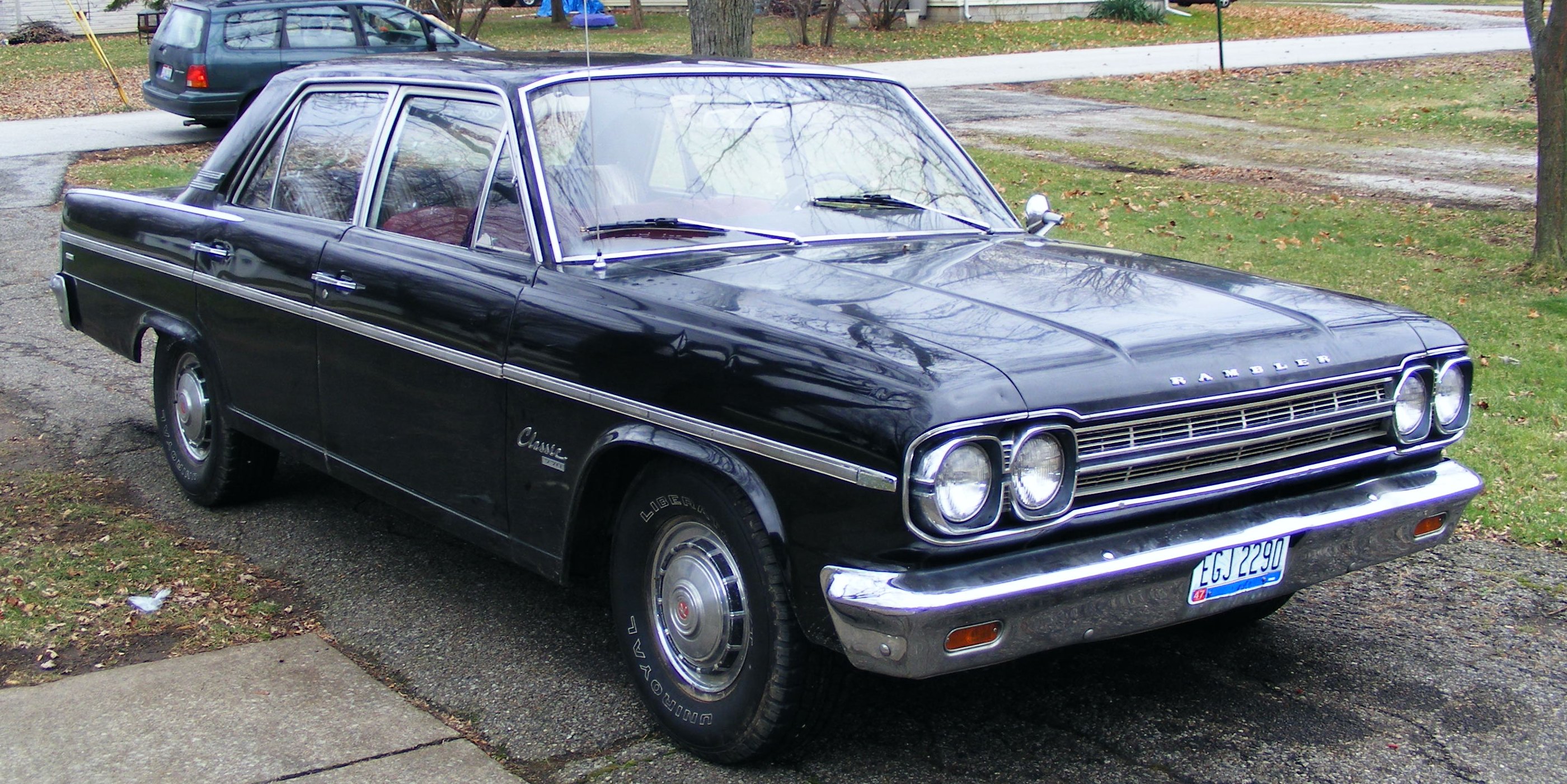
1966 Rambler Classic 770 sedan

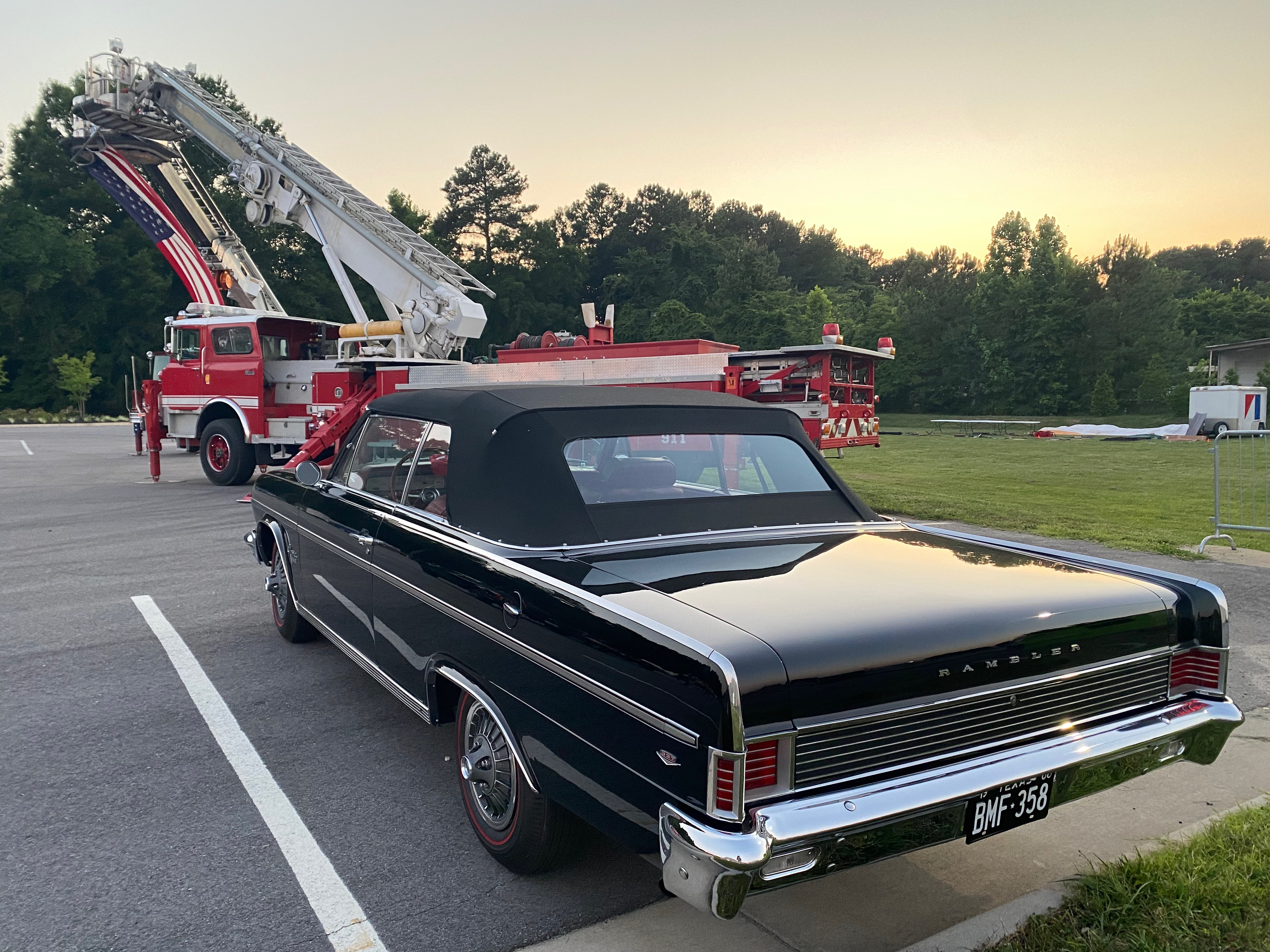
1966 Rambler Classic 770 convertible

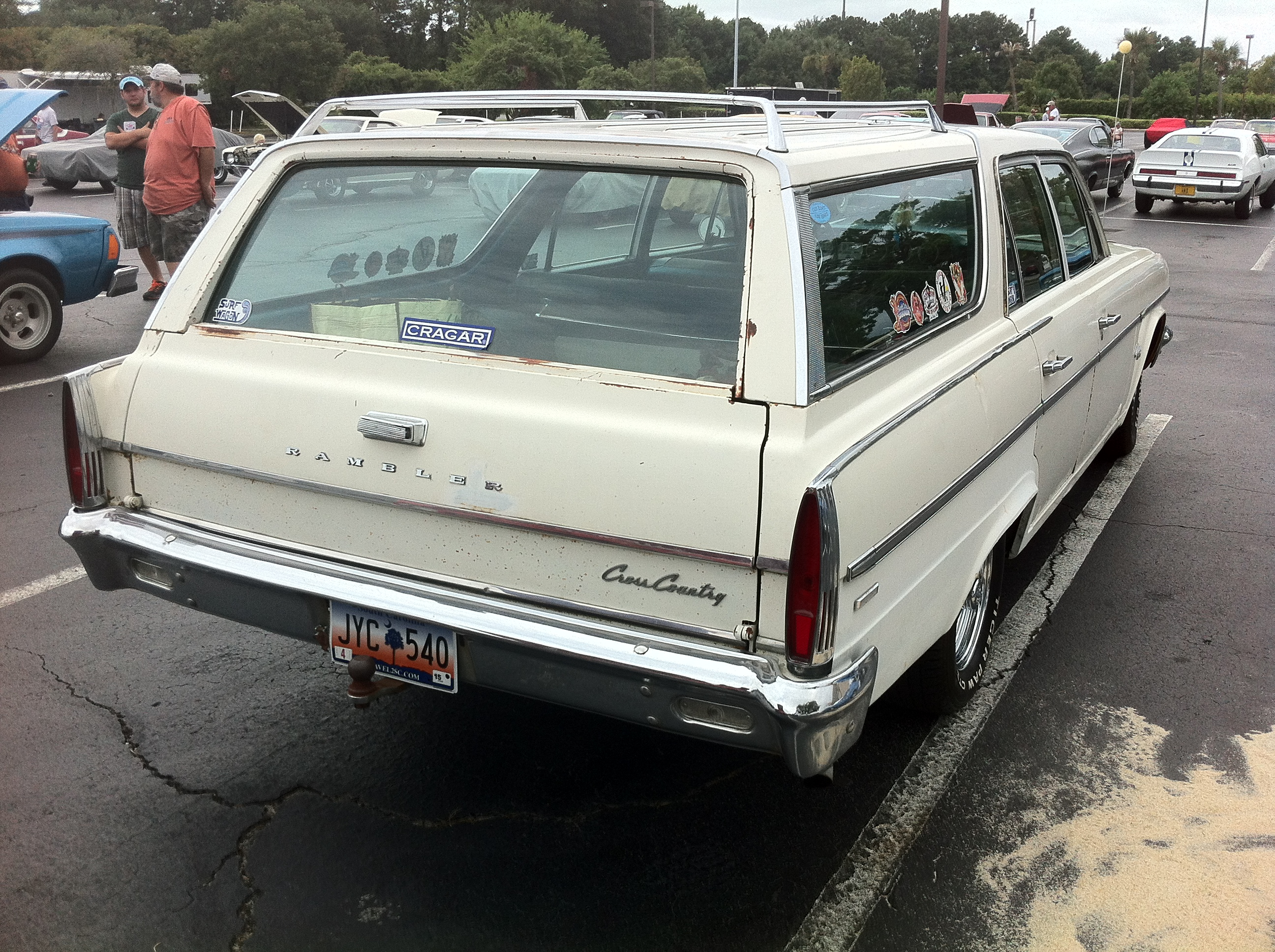
1966 Rambler Classic station wagon

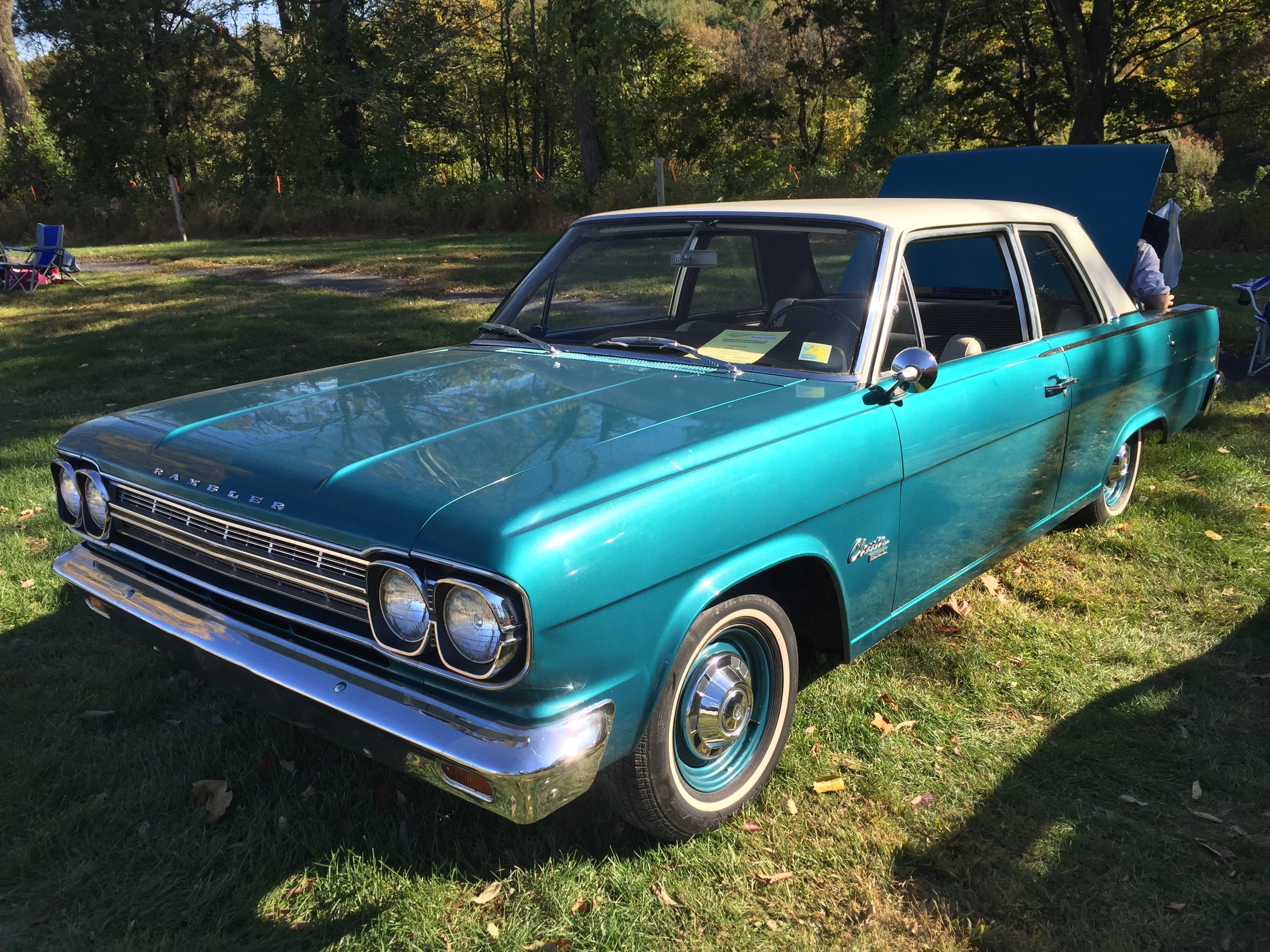
1966 Rambler Classic 550 2-door sedan

The 1966 model year Rambler Classics received minor trim changes and additional standard safety features, including a padded dash and visors, left outside mirror, as well as seat belts for the front and rear passengers. The 660 mid-trim level was dropped, leaving the 550 and 770 models for 1966. The standard I6 engine became the 232 cu in (3.8 L) with a one-barrel carburetor or optional two-barrel W-series Carter version. Available for the first time with V8 engines was a floor-mounted four-speed manual transmission and a dash-mounted tachometer.

Classics received particular attention to the styling of the roofs for 1966. The two-door hardtop models received a rectangular rear window and a more formal and angular "crisp-line" roofline that could be covered with vinyl trim. Black was the only color available for the vinyl cover until white was added in March 1966. Sedans had an optional trim-outlined "halo" roof accent paint color.

The station wagon's roof area over the cargo compartment was at the same level as the rest of the roof and no longer dipped down as in prior years. The wagons carried Cross Country insignia and featured 83 cubic feet (2,400 L) of cargo space, as well as a standard roof rack. The load-floor was lengthened by 3 inches (76 mm). The tailgate made wider and easier to operate. Two wagon seating capacities were available: a standard six-passenger version with two rows of seats with a drop-down bottom-hinged tailgate incorporating a fully retracting rear window for accessing cargo or an optional eight-passenger version with three rows of seats (the third rear-facing) and a left-side hinged rear fifth door.

Following the marketing message of "the sensible spectaculars" for the 1965 models, AMC was attempting to change its "sensible-car" reputation toward the more "youthful-oriented" 1960s marketplace. The Rambler Classic's degree of "spectacular" depended on the engine under the hood and performance-oriented equipment. Available was a high-compression four-barrel 270 hp (201 kW; 274 PS) 327 cu in (5.4 L) V8 engine and heavy-duty clutch. Options included a heavy-duty suspension, power-disk brakes, "Twin-Grip" limited-slip rear differential, and axle ratios that ranged from the standard 3.15 to the optional at no-cost economy-oriented 2.87 with automatic transmission or the performance 3.54 version when equipped with the floor-shift four-speed manual. For additional economy, an overdrive unit was available with the column-shift three-speed transmission on cars with the 232 cu in (3.8 L) I6 and 287 cu in (4.7 L) V8 engines.

Facing the "Big Three" domestic automakers, American Motors promoted itself as "the "Friendly Giant Killer" advertising campaign emphasizing its cars with "quality built-in, not added on". The Rambler Classic was priced in line with the competition with the 770 two-door hardtop equipped with the 287 cu in (4.7 L) V8 and automatic transmission listing for $2,656, while Ford and Chevrolet two-door hardtops were priced identically at $2,668 for a Fairlane with 289 cu in (4.7 L) V8 and automatic or a Malibu with 283 cu in (4.6 L) V8 and automatic.

A total of 126,006 Rambler Classics were made for the 1966 model year. However, the name Classic was no longer considered a positive factor in the marketplace, and AMC began reshuffling model designations in 1966 to launch its completely redesigned intermediate-sized line.

==== Rambler Rebel ====
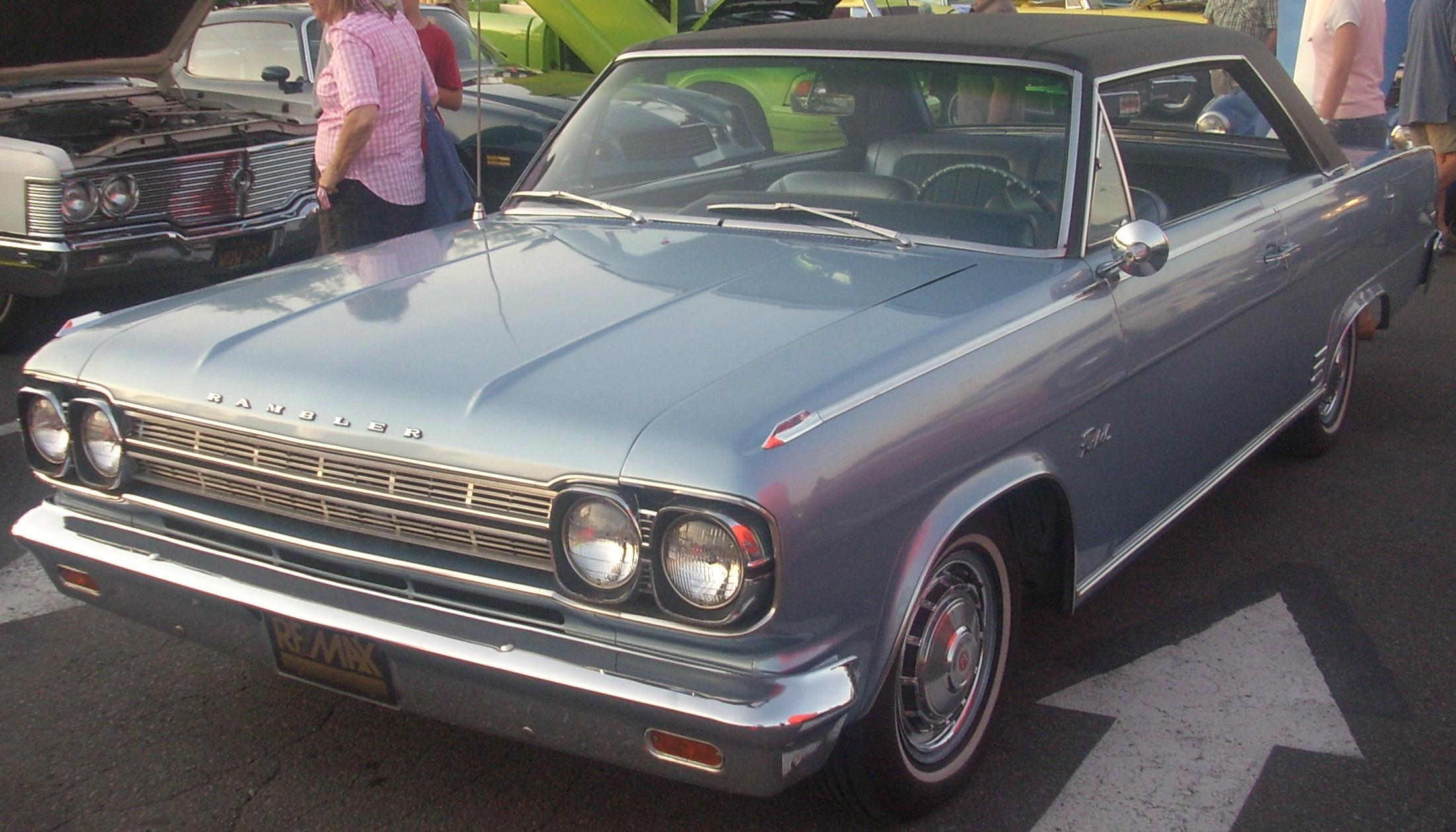
1966 Rambler Rebel 2-door hardtop

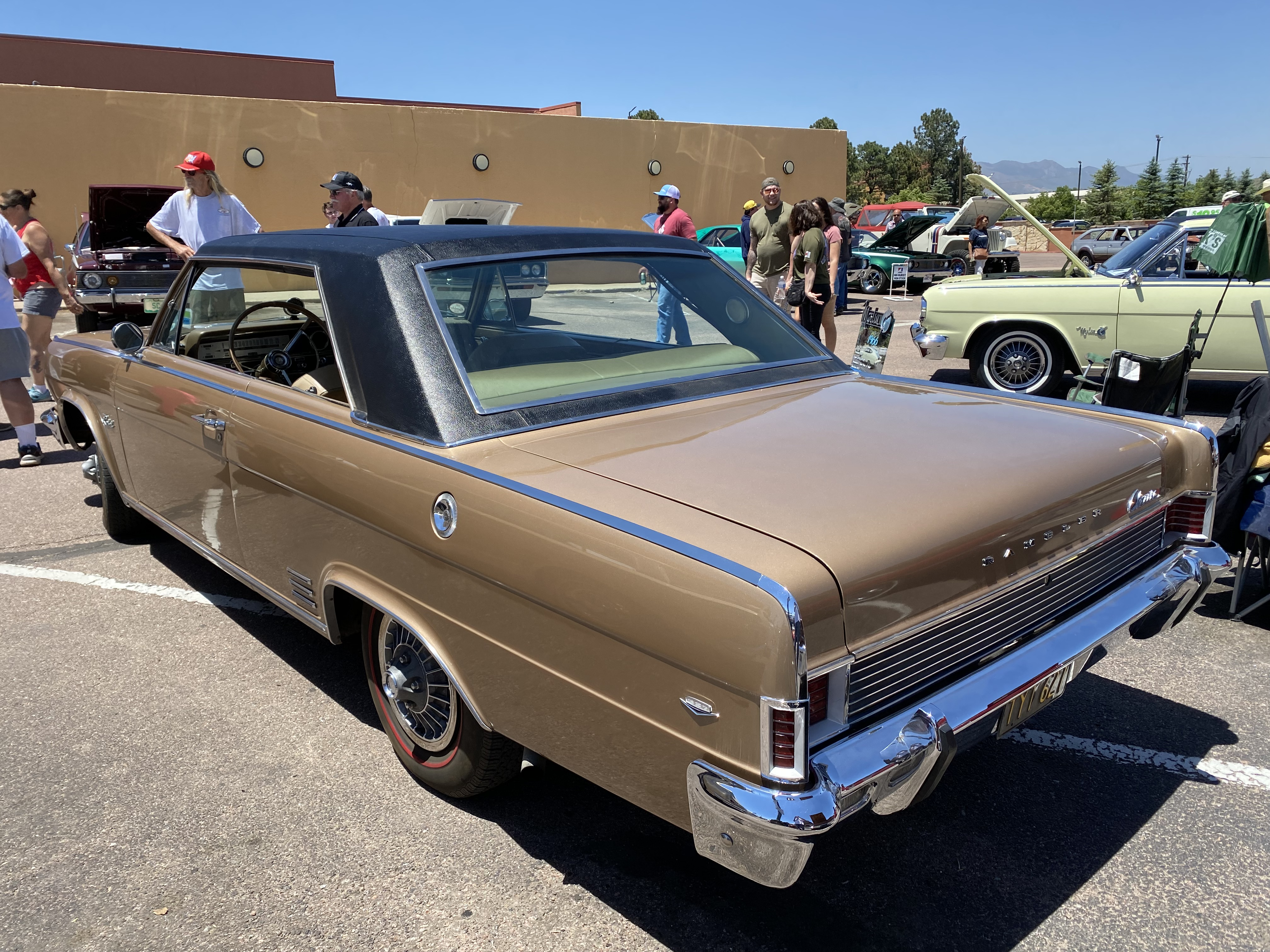
1966 Rambler Rebel 2-door hardtop

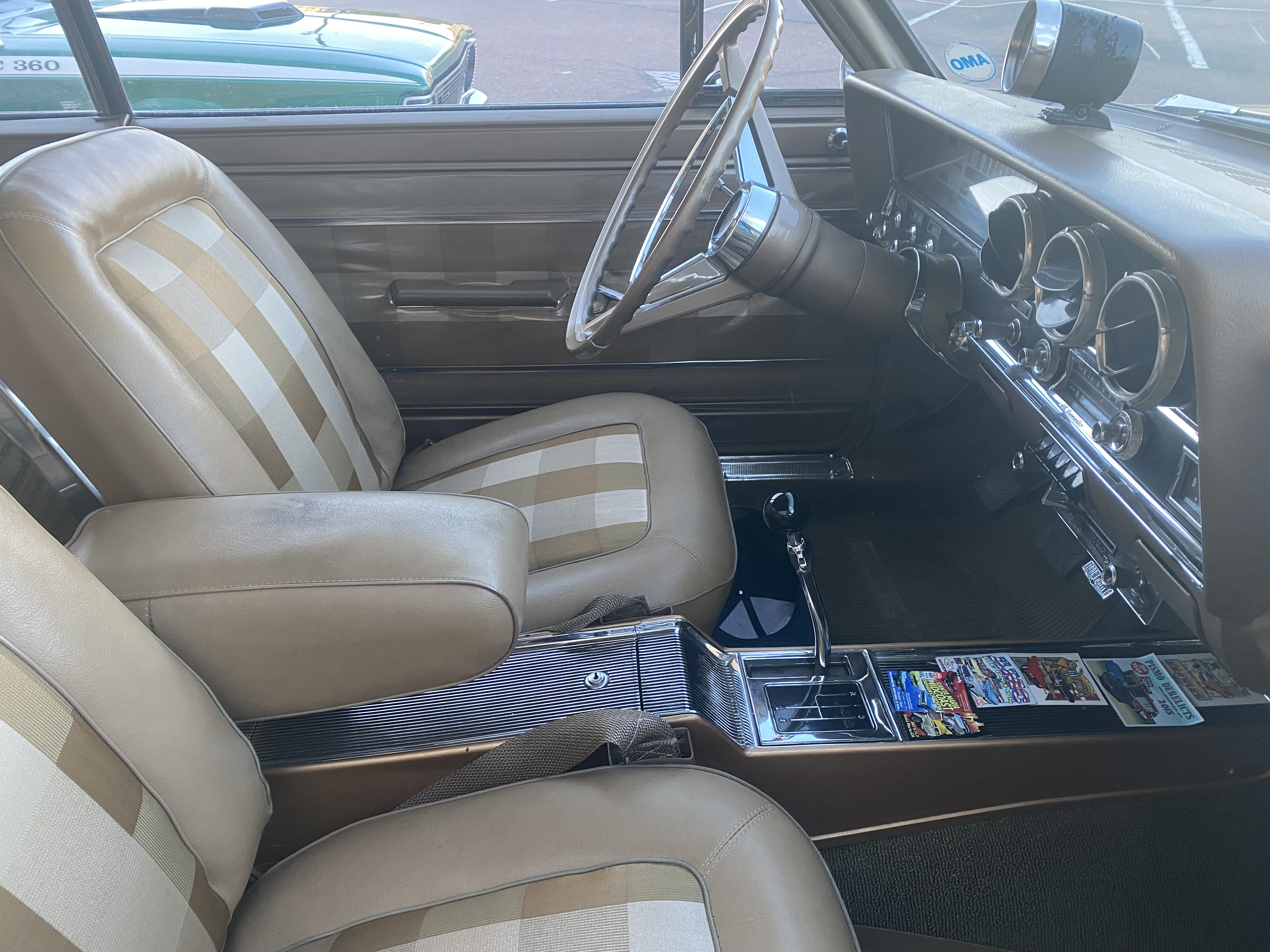
1966 Rambler Rebel with 4-speed transmission

A top-of-the-line version of the two-door hardtop Classic was offered under the historic Rambler Rebel name. It replaced the 770-H and featured special badges and standard slim-type bucket seats with optional checked upholstery with two matching pillows. Public reaction to the tartan touch appearing in some of AMC's "Project IV" automobile show tour cars was judged favorable enough to make the unique trim available on the Rebel hardtop.

American Motors advertised the new model as "I'm a Rebel!" emphasizing that the new Rambler "doesn't cramp your style, or your legs, or your family, or your pocketbook." describing the "surprises" that are not available in the competing Plymouth Belvedere, Chevrolet Chevelle, or Ford Fairlane intermediated-size models. Sales of the top-of-the-line Rambler Rebel were 7,592.

Serving as one example to verify how the automotive press sometimes derided AMC products, Popular Science magazine wrote that the new "Rambler Rebel reveals a sudden interest in performance," but its handling package cannot overcome the car's obsolete suspension design. However, AMC continued using this suspension design on the larger sized models, rather than an open Hotchkiss that needs stiff springs to resist torque reaction and driving thrust. The big AMC models employed a strut-type front and a Panhard rod controlled torque tube rear-drive system with long coil springs that allows them to function only for suspension duties.ref name="Hillier"/> The design also placed the upper spring seats higher into the body of the car. These features afforded a softer ride quality. The designs provided better handling by reducing the geometrical leverage of the car's center of gravity for less body roll "sway" in cornering. The "obsolete" description of AMC's design is juxtaposed how General Motors employed a similar suspension system on their third-generation Camaro and Firebird nearly twenty years later, which featured MacPherson strut front and a torque arm mounted rear-drive axle.

==== Rambler St. Moritz ====
A customized show car was displayed along production models during the 1966 automobile show circuit, the snow- and ski-themed Rambler St. Moritz station wagon. The wagon with three rows of seats featured tinted rear side "observation" windows that curved up and over into the roof. The remaining roof over the cargo area was finished with polished stainless steel and equipped with a unique ski rack design. The exterior was a light ice-blue pearlescent paint, while the car's dark blue interior featured Corfam upholstery with a metallic thread embroidered snowflake in each seat back.

== International markets ==
American Motors actively directed exports of finished cars from its Canadian and U.S. plants to independent distributors. Generous discounts were also available to U.S. military and diplomatic service personnel for individual purchases while overseas. More significantly, AMC was directly involved in joint ventures or utilized licensees in several overseas business ventures to produce or distribute Rambler Classics. The cars were marketed under the Rambler or local company brands in various international markets.

=== Argentina ===
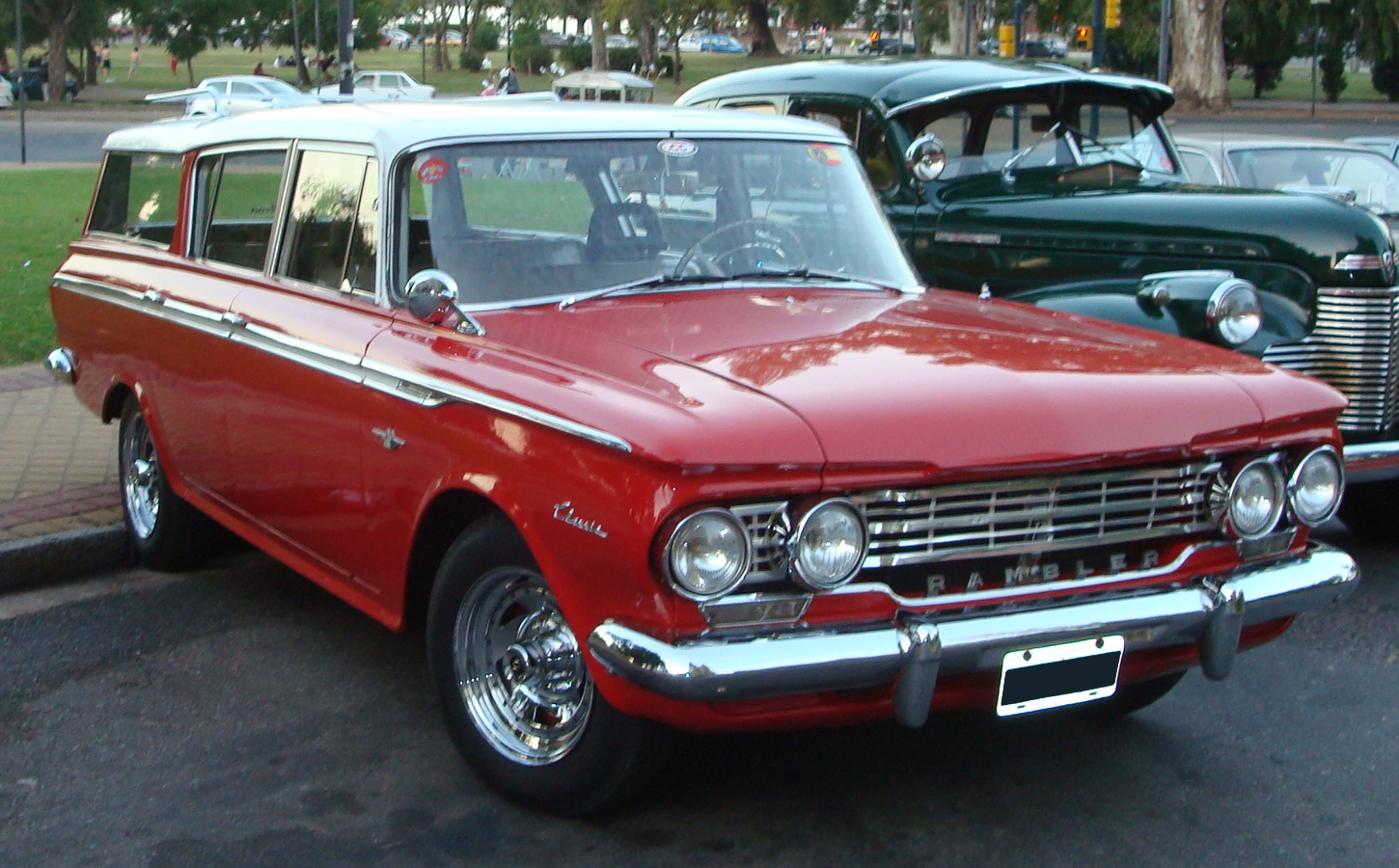
IKA Rambler Cross Country in Argentina

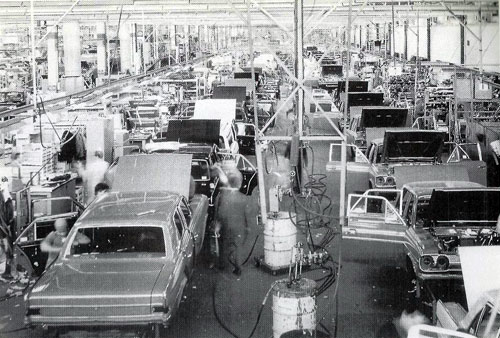
IKA Rambler production in 1969

Industrias Kaiser Argentina (IKA) produced Rambler Classics in Córdoba, Argentina, from 1962 through 1971. The low-cost joint venture with AMC was established on 24 May 1961, to assemble Rambler Classics was established to fill the gap between the IKA license-assembled small Renault Dauphine and its big Kaiser Carabela. These two cars, and a IKA license-built Alfa Romeo 1900 sedan, "had one thing in common: they weren't exactly suited to Argentine conditions". Production of the locally-built Classics, and similar Ambassadors, that replaced old models, began on 18 January 1961, and proved popular in Argentina.

Two body styles were available: a four-door sedan, marketed as the "Classic", and a station wagon version sold as the "Cross Country". Each car received a numerical nomenclature, depending on the level of equipment: "400", "440", "550", "660", and "990". All were powered by the 3.77 L (230 cu in) overhead camshaft (OHC) straight-six "Tornado Interceptor" engines that Kaiser Motors originally developed in the U.S. for the 1963 Jeep Gladiator pickups and Wagoneers. This engine was later produced in Argentina; thus, the automobiles' domestic (locally sourced) content increased to gain tariff concessions for the imported U.S. components from AMC.

In 1963, the best-selling model in Argentina was the IKA Rambler. A road test of an IKA Rambler Classic 660 by the Argentinean automotive magazine, Revista Parabrisas, described significant differences to the 1962 versions, noting the new stylized simple lines and more fluid design, as well as concluding that it is "a large and comfortable ride for both the city and touring, as well as – depending on the driver – can be sporty."

In June 1966, IKA launched a special Taxi version of the Rambler Classic in Buenos Aires. The IKA-modified cars included heavy-duty running gear, vinyl interior, and taxi-specific accessories, which included the standard IKA-built "Tornado" 230 cu in (3.8 L) overhead cam (OHC) engine.

=== Australia ===
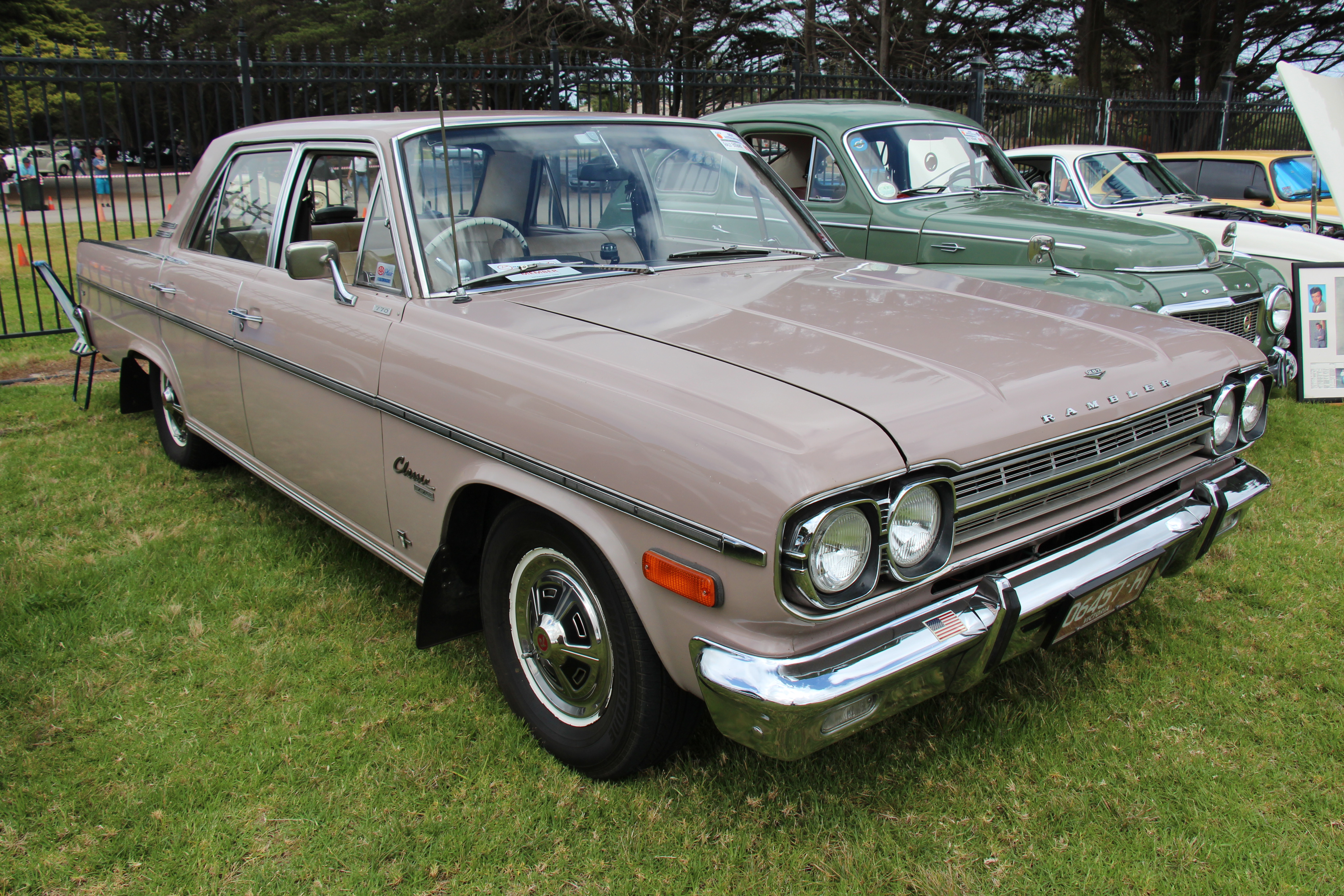
Right-hand-drive 1966 Rambler Classic 770 in Australia

Rambler Classics were assembled by Australian Motor Industries (AMI) in Australia from 1961. They were built from semi-knock-down (SKD) kits. The vehicles were partially assembled and painted at AMC's Kenosha, Wisconsin, factory. They were built with right-hand drive and the body had the engine, transmission, front suspension, rear axle, and doors installed. AMI specified the parts and other components to be boxed and shipped inside each of the cars. Interior components such as upholstery and various other parts were locally sourced to get import tariff concessions. Australian cars were also fitted with amber rear turn signal lights to comply with safety standards in Australia.

The Australian-assembled versions were identical in appearance to the U.S. models through the three generations. The base prices of Rambler Classics dropped with the introduction of the redesigned 1963 models due to the elimination of some standard equipment such as the reclining front seats and heater. Two four-door body styles were available: sedan and station wagon. A Classic sedan was offered in Australia for the first time with a manual transmission. However, the biggest selling model was the six-cylinder Classic sedan with an automatic transmission. The AMI Rambler Classics exhibited high standards of assembly and finish.

Additionally, the Brampton, Ontario AMC plant in Canada sent eight fully assembled, right-hand-drive Classic 770 hardtops to Australia in 1964 and 1965.

AMI also acted as the State distributor for Ramblers for Victoria. Rambler sales for New South Wales were managed by Sydney company, Grenville Motors Pty Ltd, which was also the State distributor of Rover and Land Rover. A network of Sydney and country NSW dealers were controlled by Grenville which was in direct communication with AMI.

Australian Capital Territory sales were managed by Betterview Pty Ltd in Canberra. Annand & Thompson Pty Ltd in Brisbane distributed Rambler vehicles for Queensland. South Australian sales were managed by Champions Pty Ltd in Adelaide. Premier Motors Pty Ltd in Perth distributed Ramblers for Western Australia, and Heathco Motors in Launceston distributed Rambler vehicles for Tasmania.

=== Canada ===
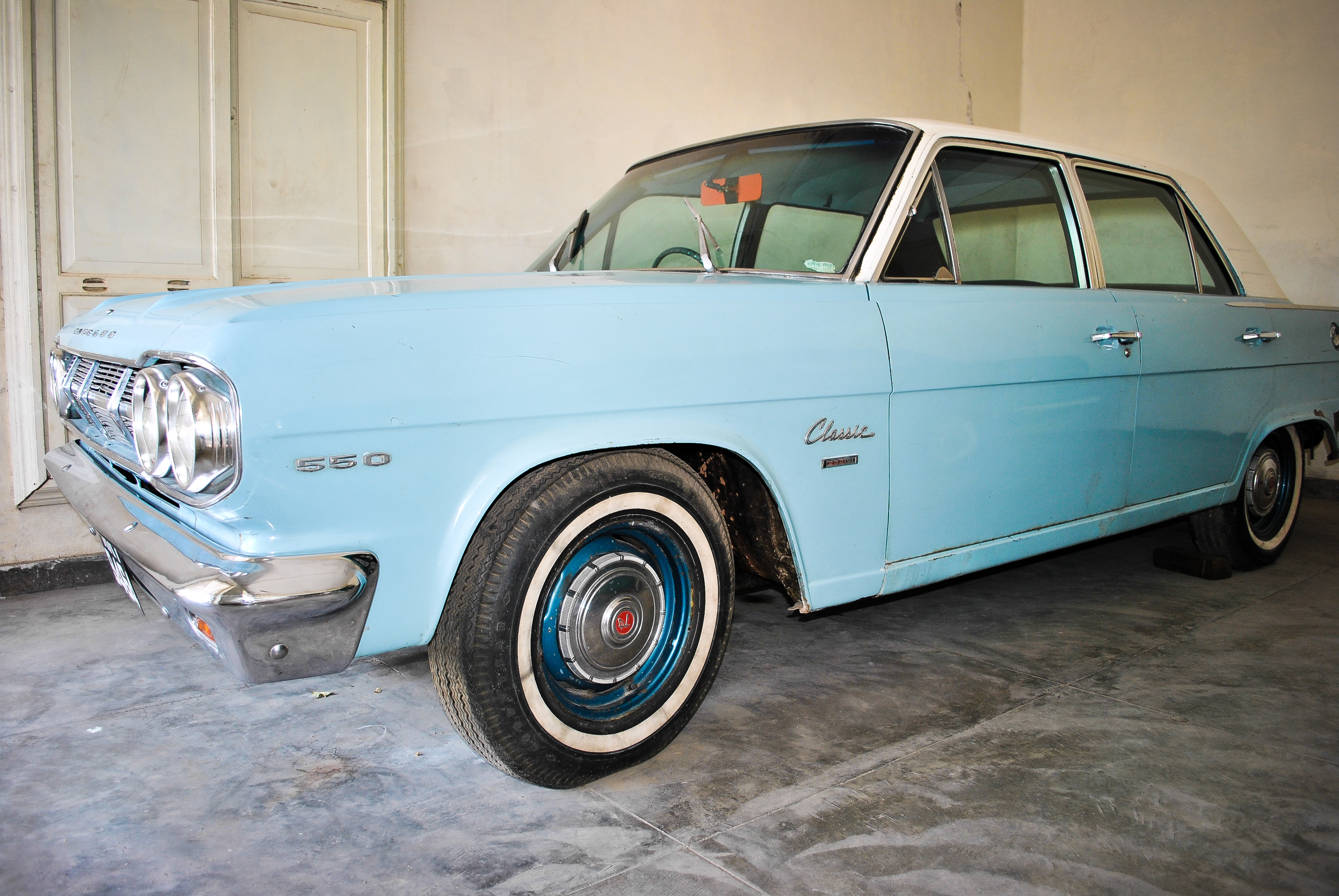
Canadian-built right-hand drive 1965 Rambler Classic 550 at the Vintage & Classic Car Collection Museum in Udaipur, India

American Motors established a vehicle assembly plant in Brampton, Ontario, Canada in 1961 to assemble AMC vehicles for the Canadian market. With Canada being a Commonwealth country, the Brampton plant also undertook to export complete vehicles to right-hand-drive markets including Australia, India, New Zealand, and the United Kingdom. For example, records for the Brampton plant show that 129 RHD Rambler Americans and 255 RHD Rambler Classics were exported in 1964 of which the majority were exported to the United Kingdom.

=== Chile ===
Rambler vehicle assembly began in Chile at the beginning of 1964 under a partnership between AMC and Renault. The Rambler Classic was assembled alongside Renault vehicles at the Indauto plant in Arica. Vehicle production was transferred to Automotores Franco Chilena in Los Andes, Santiago after 1967.

=== Costa Rica ===
Starting in 1959, Purdy Motor, owned by Xavier Quirós Oreamuno, distributed Rambler vehicles in Costa Rica. Many Central and South American nations established local content regulations during the 1960s. These laws effectively required automobiles sold in those markets to be assembled locally from knock-down kits. A new company, ECASA was established in 1964 by Oreamuno, and by September 1965, the first vehicle to be built in Costa Rica was a 1964 Rambler Classic 660 that still exists. The company assembled Rambler Classics until 1969 and other AMC models until 1974, as well as Toyota's Corona and Land Cruiser. By 1973, Toyota acquired 20% of ECASA.

=== Finland ===
Rambler vehicles were imported into Finland by two major Finnish automotive importers, Oy Voimavaunu Ab and Suomen Maanviljelijäin Kauppa Oy (SMK Group.) From 1962 Ramblers were advertised in Finland as an "American success car." The brand's best sales years were 1964 (almost 600 cars) and 1965 (more than 700 cars). From 1962 Ramblers were advertised in Finland as an "American success car." From the mid-1960s, Wihuri Group, a large multi-sector family business, took over import operations using its shipping operation, Autola Oy. Rambler Classics and Americans were quite common in taxi use. Wihuri continued to import AMC vehicles until 1975.

=== France (and Europe) ===
Renault Rambler
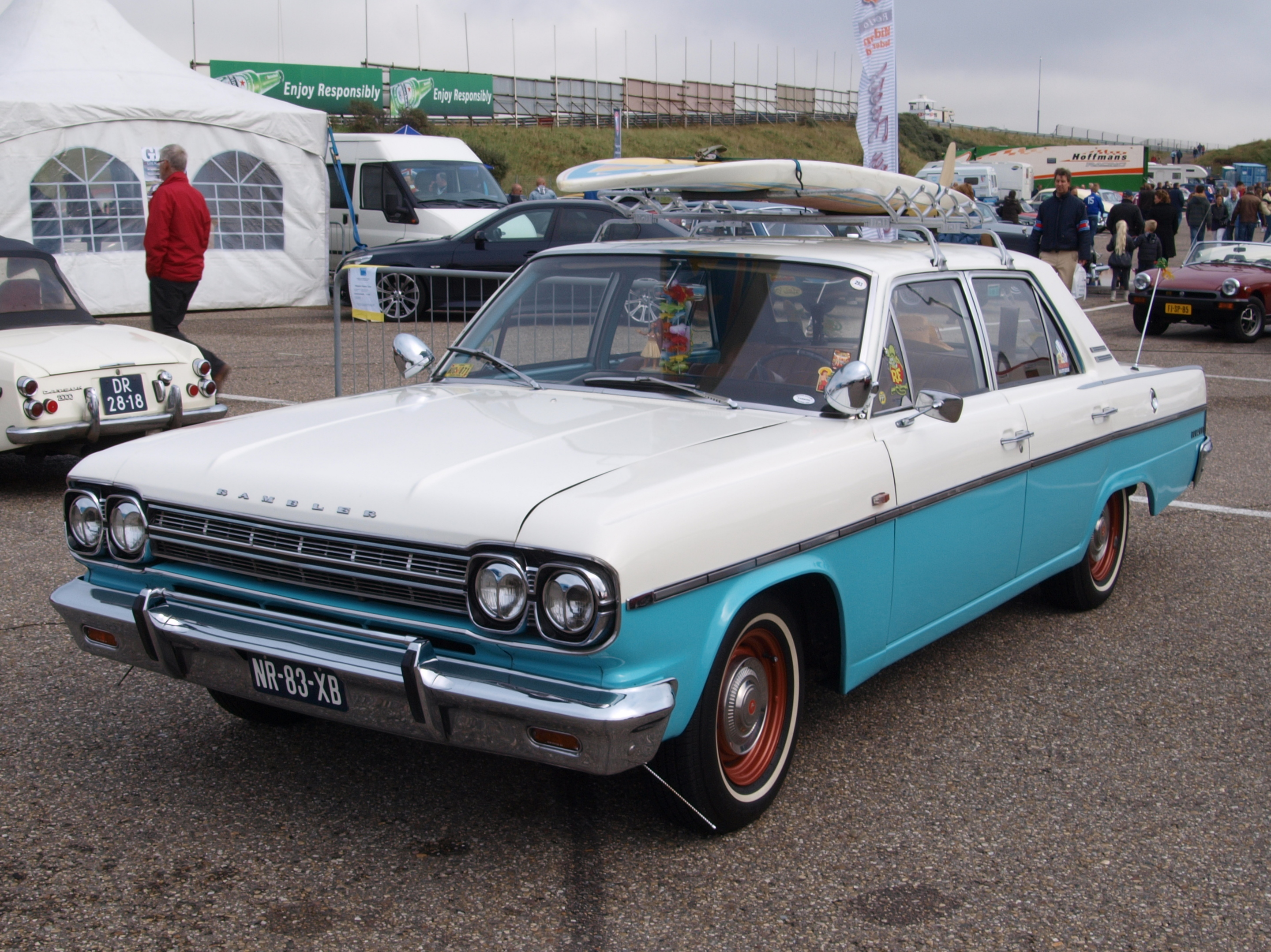
- 1966 Renault Rambler

Overview
- Assembly: Belgium: Vilvoorde (Renault)

Chronology
- Predecessor: Renault Frégate
- Successor: Renault Rambler Rebel

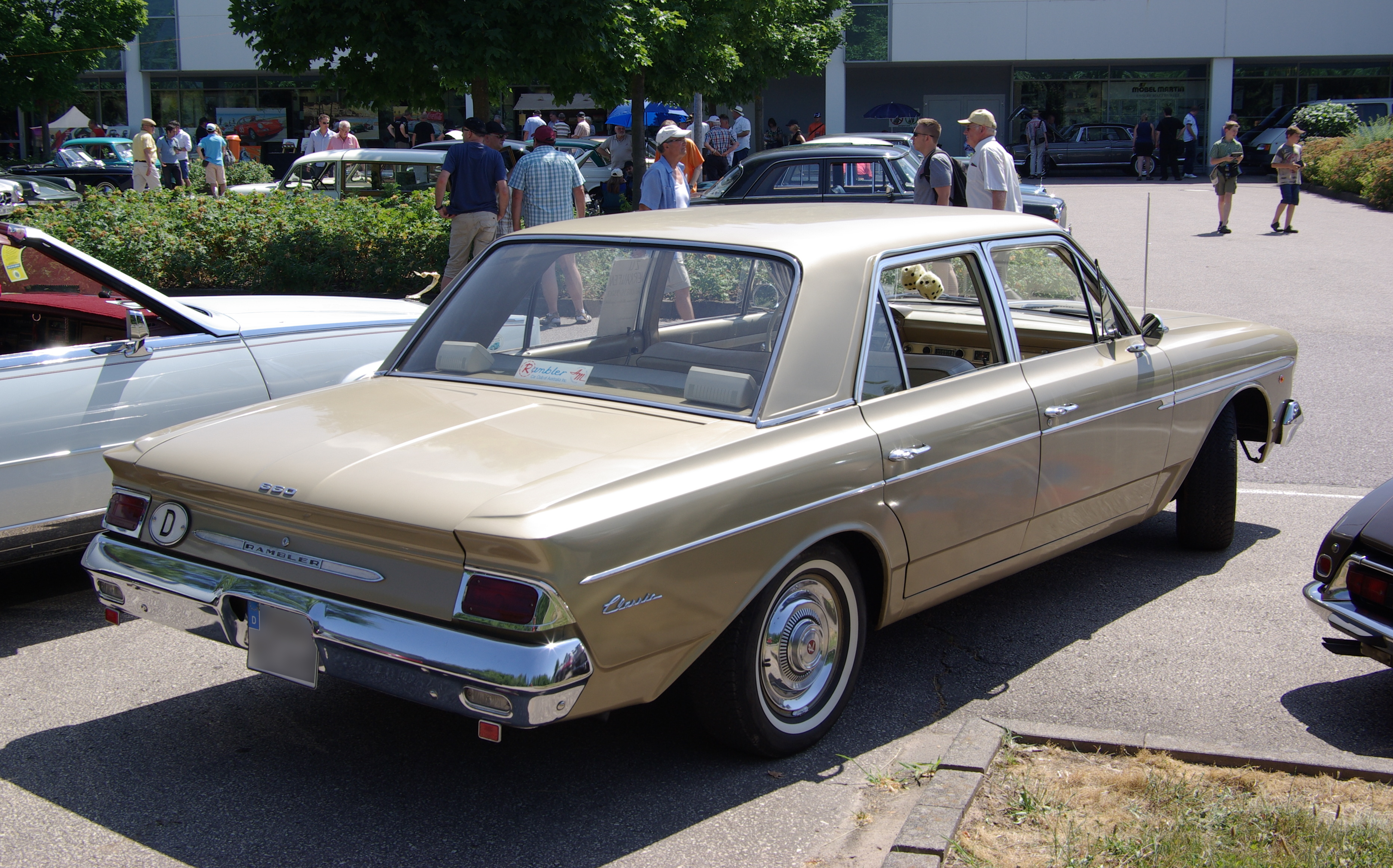
1963 Rambler in Germany

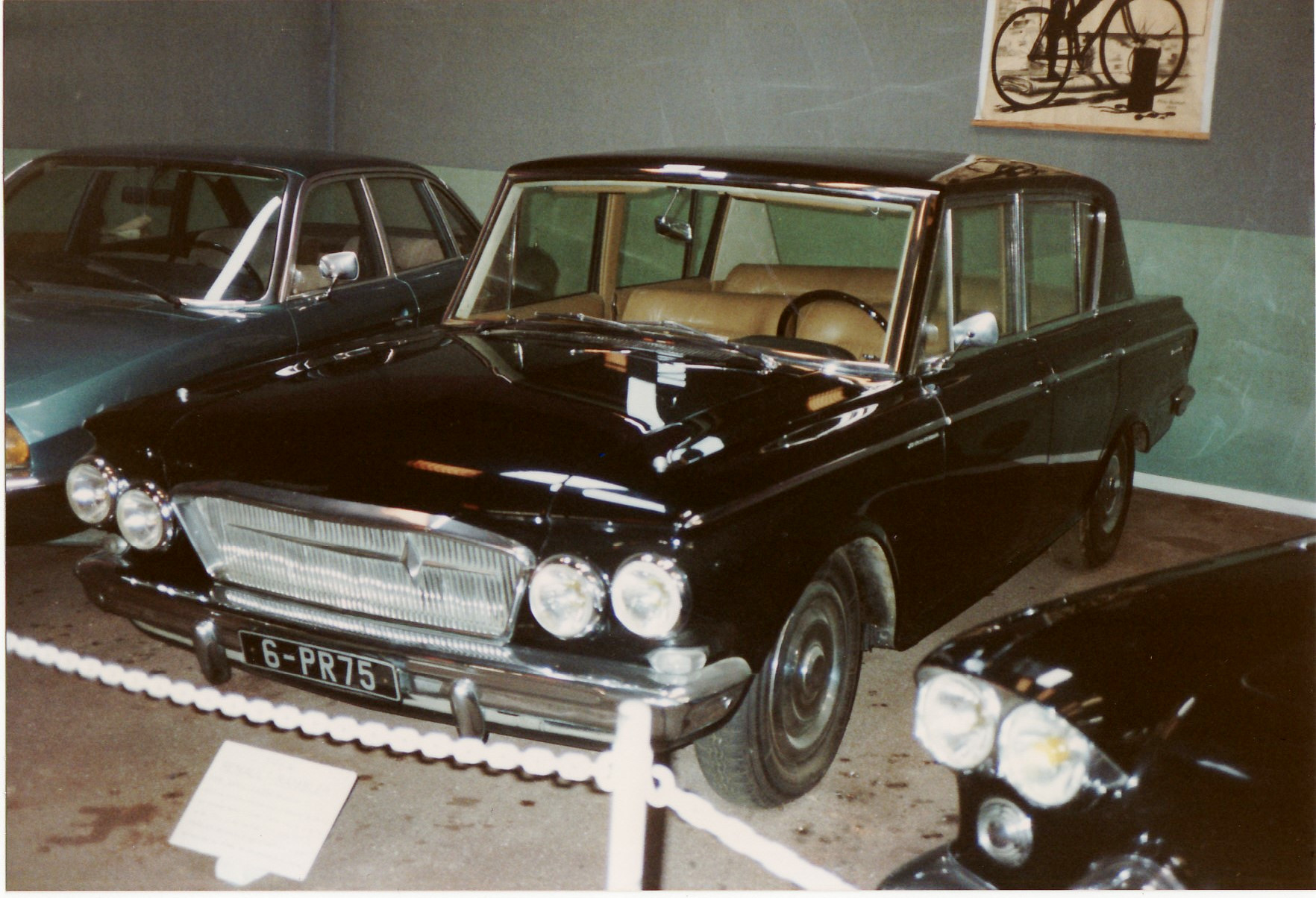
1962 Rambler Renault Presidential

All three generations of the Rambler Classics were assembled from CKD (Completely Knocked Down) kits by Renault at the Vilvoorde factory in Haren, Belgium beginning in 1962 and sold through Renault dealers in Algeria, Austria, Belgium, France, the Netherlands, and Luxembourg,

The French automaker no longer had a large car after the Renault Frégate in its model range and the Rambler Classic was chosen for its "European-style" features and sold as an "executive car" in Renault's markets, and badged as the "Rambler Renault", under the terms of a cooperation agreement concluded between the two automakers on 21 November 1961.

The French coachbuilder, Henri Chapron, modified 1962 Rambler sedans to serve as presidential limousines for the government of Charles de Gaulle. Modifications included a custom grille and a single chrome strip the full length of the bodyside, a raised roof, as well as the elimination of the stock panoramic rear window by straight back glass framed by large C-pillars. One objective of Renault, the state-owned automaker at the time, was to recapture the French limousine market segment from Citroën. However, de Gaulle selected the slightly less roomy Citroen.

The Classic's successor, the Rambler Rebel, was also built by the Belgium Renault plant for the 1967 year only and was also sold as "Rambler Renault" in France's domestic and export markets.

=== Mexico ===
Willys Mexicana S.A. had agreements with AMC to assemble the compact Rambler American models and began preparing for the introduction of the larger Rambler Classic to the Mexican market in 1963. During this time the automaker became Vehiculos Automotores Mexicanos (VAM). This coincided with the launch of the second generation of the U.S. Classic, and the VAM Classic became the second AMC product made by VAM in Mexico. The new model was focused as the luxury companion to the Rambler American compact line and as VAM's flagship automobile as the Ambassador line was not produced in Mexico. A major marketing campaign by VAM promoted the inaugural 1963 models using Motor Trend's Car of the Year award. The VAM Rambler Classic was a success among consumers and the automotive press, obtaining praise for the car's roominess, comfort, styling, advanced engineering, as well as its economy and value.

The 1963 Rambler Classics were available only in two- and four-door sedan body designs, both called Rambler Classic 660. No other trim levels or versions were available. The standard engine and transmission combination was the OHV 195.6 cu in (3.2 L) I6 engine with a single barrel carburetor producing 127 hp (95 kW; 129 PS) at 4200 rpm with an 8.7:1 compression ratio and coupled to a three-speed manual transmission with column-mounted shifter. The 138 hp (103 kW; 140 PS) two-barrel version of the 195.6 six was also available at extra cost. Standard equipment for all included built-in flow-through ventilation, four-wheel drum brakes with twin circuits and a double master cylinder, manual steering, electric wipers and washers, coil-spring-based suspension, carpeting, front and rear bench seats consisting of foam rubber and coil springs, side marker lights, hazard lights, backup lights, luxury steering wheel with horn ring and "R" emblem, 200 km/h speedometer, fuel and water temperature gauges, dual front ashtrays, cigarette lighter, electric clock, AM radio, rearview mirror, front and rear side armrests, dual rear ashtrays, dual coat hooks, round dome light, padded sun visors, driver's side remote mirror, as well as a bright molding package. Optional equipment included power brakes, power steering, front seatbelts, heater, passenger's side remote mirror, bumper guards, bumper tubes, and full-wheel covers.

For 1964, the VAM Rambler Classic incorporated the new styling upgrades from its AMC domestic counterpart models. The two-barrel 138 hp (103 kW; 140 PS) version of the 195.6 six became standard.

The 1965 model year followed the styling changes of the U.S. cars. The biggest change was AMC's new seven-main-bearing 232 cu in (3.8 L) I6 engine in 145 hp (108 kW; 147 PS) version as standard equipment and a double barrel 155 hp (116 kW; 157 PS) version as optional. The new engines were now manufactured in VAM's factory that was built in 1964 at Lerma, State of Mexico. The new engines replaced the imported L-head and OHV 195.6 engines in VAM's vehicles.

The cars saw a name change for 1966, from Rambler Classic 660 to Rambler Classic 770. Despite the "trim level" upgrade, the car was mostly the same. The cars became progressively more luxurious over the years. The two-door Rambler Classic 770 featured individual reclining front seats and its marketing focused on sportiness, marking for the first time a difference between the two body styles other than their number of doors.

The VAM Rambler Classic was not available in Mexico as a two-door hardtop, two-door convertible, or four-door station wagon. The Rambler Classic-based Marlin fastbacks were also not produced under VAM as also were not the 1963-1964 Ambassador models based on the same platform. The Rambler Classic model enjoyed popularity and a positive image among the Mexican public. For this reason in 1967, with the arrival of AMC's completely new Rebel line in the mid-size market segment, VAM continued the Rambler Classic name. It went well into the 1970s, by which time the VAM Rambler Classic was now the AMC Matador.

=== New Zealand ===
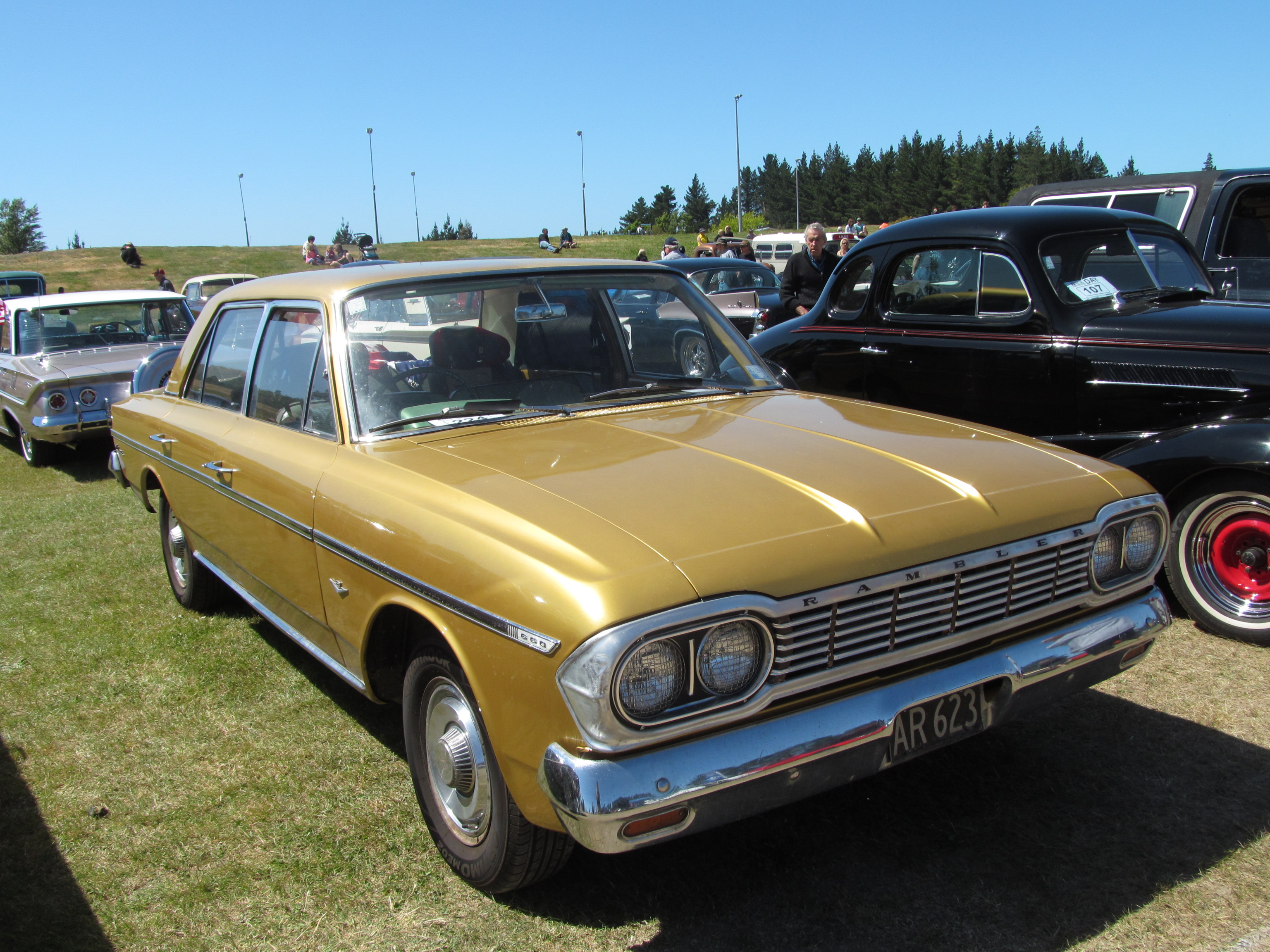
Right-hand-drive New Zealand-assembled 1964 Rambler Classic

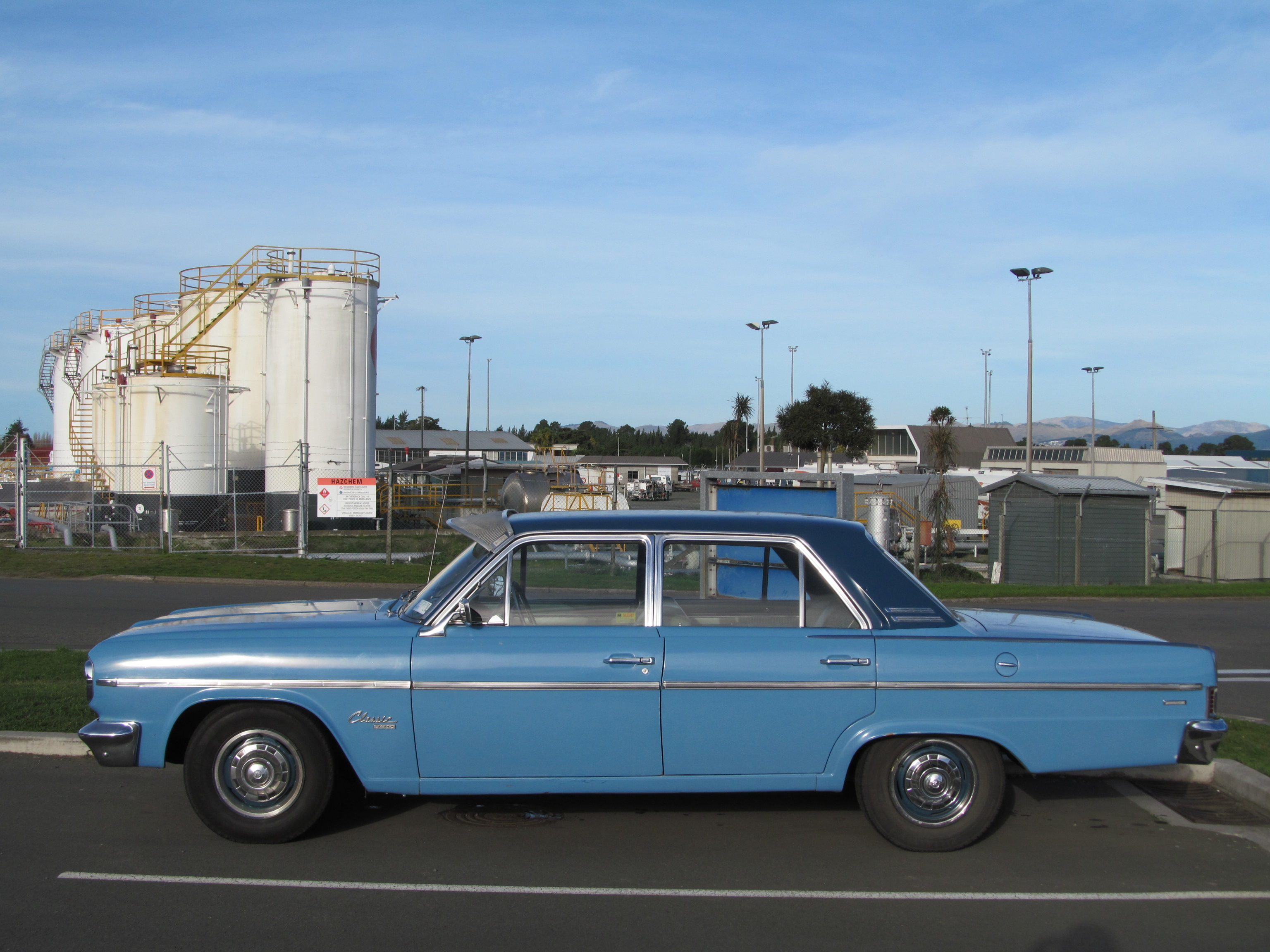
New Zealand assembled Rambler Classic

Rambler Classics were assembled by New Zealand company VW Motors in their Volkswagen assembly plant in Otahuhu, Auckland until 1962.

In 1964 Campbell Motors, the importer of Studebaker and Willys vehicles, built a plant in Thames, New Zealand to assemble AMC vehicles. The assembly business was named Campbell Motor Industries (CMI). CMI assembled Peugeots and Ramblers and later Hino, Isuzu, Renault, Datsun, and Toyota. The first Rambler to come off the line was a Rambler Classic in September 1964.

Like Australia, New Zealand cars were assembled from right-hand drive knock-down kits from Kenosha. The vehicles were partially assembled and painted at the factory with the engine, transmission, front suspension, rear axle, and doors installed. Some of the other components were boxed and shipped inside the car for final assembly by CMI. Unlike Australia, interior trim was also included with the knock-down kits, as the motor trimming industry in New Zealand had ceased to exist since the end of the 1930s following the demise of local coach builders due to the preference of full imports. Hence, New Zealand-assembled Ramblers are more "American" than their Australian equivalents. For 1966, CMI assembled 336 Rambler Classics for the New Zealand market, only slightly fewer than the Datsuns and Peugeots they also assembled in the same year.

=== Norway ===
Ramblers were imported into Norway during the 1950s and 1960s by Norwegian importer Kolberg & Caspary AS located at Ås, Norway. Kolberg & Caspary was formed in 1906 and imported automotive, industrial, and construction products. The Rambler Classic was imported from 1963 until 1966, with the majority between 1963 and 1965. A total of 558 cars were brought into Norway by 1966. Rambler Ambassadors, Americans, and Rebels were also imported in small numbers.

=== Peru ===
Ramblers were marketed in Peru during the 1960s by Rambler del Peru S.A and were sold and serviced by a network of 13 dealers. In January 1966, Renault and AMC created Industria Automotriz Peruana S.A. to locally assemble Renault, AMC, and Peugeot vehicles. Only small numbers were produced of all three brands with AMC vehicles amounting to 750 built between 1966 and 1970, including the Rambler Classic.

=== Philippines ===
While the Philippines was almost exclusively an American car market until 1941, the post-World War II years saw an influx of European cars enter the market. Despite a saturation of international brands, American Motors Corporation managed to establish a presence and the Rambler Classic and Rambler American were locally assembled by Luzon Machineries Inc. in Manila during the 1960s.

=== United Kingdom ===
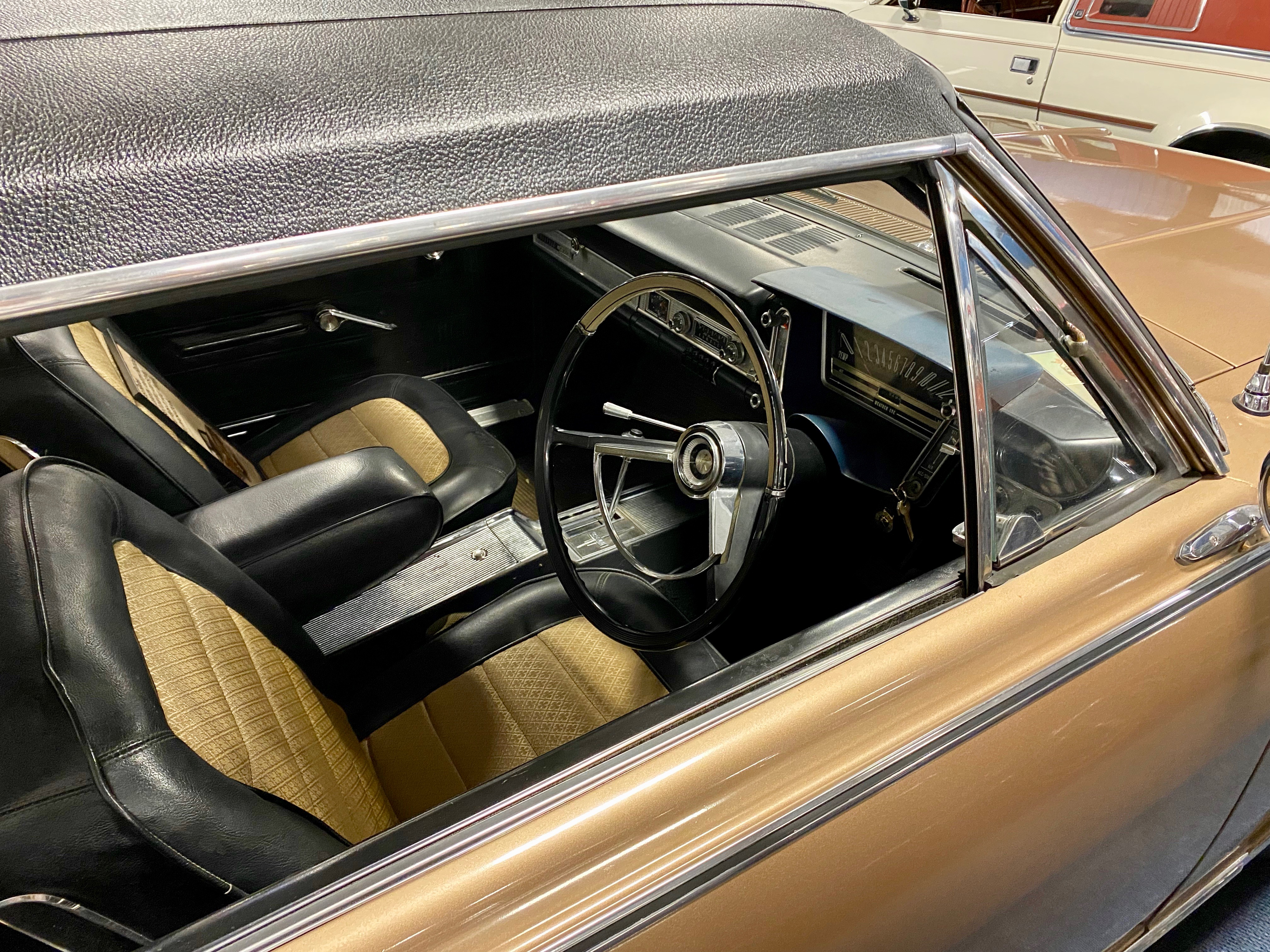
Third generation right-hand-drive versions utilized the second-generation instrument panel

The Rambler Classic and Rambler American were first imported from Canada by London company, Nash Concessionaires Ltd. Nash Concessionaires had previously been the U.K importer of Nash vehicles. UK vehicles were imported in factory right-hand drive from the Brampton plant in Canada. The dash plaque read "Rambler of Canada." The company was also involved in the export of the British-built Nash Metropolitan to the United States. The 1961 Classic '6' saloon (sedan) sold for £1798 and the Classic station wagon sold for £1963.

Rambler Motors (A.M.C) Ltd of Chiswick in West London, had assembled Hudson motor vehicles for the UK market since 1926. The operation became a subsidiary of AMC in 1961 and changed its name to Rambler Motors (A.M.C) Ltd in 1966. Rambler Motors went on to import factory right-hand-drive AMC vehicles from 1961 and into the 1970s. Parts and spares were supplied locally out of the Chiswick service center located on Great West Road for the whole of the United Kingdom, Europe, and the Middle East. In addition to Rambler parts, the stock of spares also covered Hudson, Nash, and Austin Metropolitan parts.

=== Venezuela ===
Ramblers were assembled in Venezuela from May 1963 under a partnership between the Venezuelan government, AMC, and Renault. Automovil de Francia built an assembly plant at Mariara, 100 kilometres (62 mi) north of Caracas to build AMC and Renault vehicles including the Rambler Classic. Partnerships with AMC to locally build AMC vehicles continued throughout the 1960s and early 1970s and as with all export markets vehicles continued to be branded in Venezuela as "Rambler" even after the brand was dropped by AMC after 1969.

== Owners ==
Former U.S. presidential candidate Mitt Romney received his first car in 1965 while he was a student at Brigham Young University, a used 1963 Rambler Classic from his father, AMC President George W. Romney.
