= Edmund E. Anderson =

- Born: Edmund Eugene Anderson; April 29, 1906; South Boardman, Michigan
- Died: October 23, 1989 (aged 83); Baudette, Minnesota
- Occupation: Industrial designer
- Employers: General Motors; Nash Motors; American Motors Corporation
- Notable work: Rambler American (first generation)

Edmund Eugene Anderson (April 29, 1906 – October 23, 1989) was an automotive designer in the North American automotive industry at General Motors and notably as the lead designer for American Motors Corporation (AMC) from 1950 to 1961.

== Early life ==
Edmund E. Anderson was born in South Boardman, Michigan, the son of Joseph and Nanny Anderson. The family moved to Alba, Michigan when Edmund was a young man. His family had a saw/lumber mill.

Before World War II, Anderson became head of GM's Oldsmobile Styling Studio. He then headed the Chevrolet Styling Studios. He was described as a capable designer and a good administrator, but his greatest talent was his ability to spot talented people.

Anderson was recruited in 1950 by George W. Mason, the president of Nash Motors, to develop the independent automaker's in-house design studio, which became known as Nash Styling. From 1950 to 1955, Anderson worked with Helene Rother, who was under contract for the company and responsible for interiors that offered beautiful designs. Anderson also hired Bill Reddig, a talented former Ford Motor Company designer, who made important contributions to the 1954 Rambler line.

== Anderson designs ==
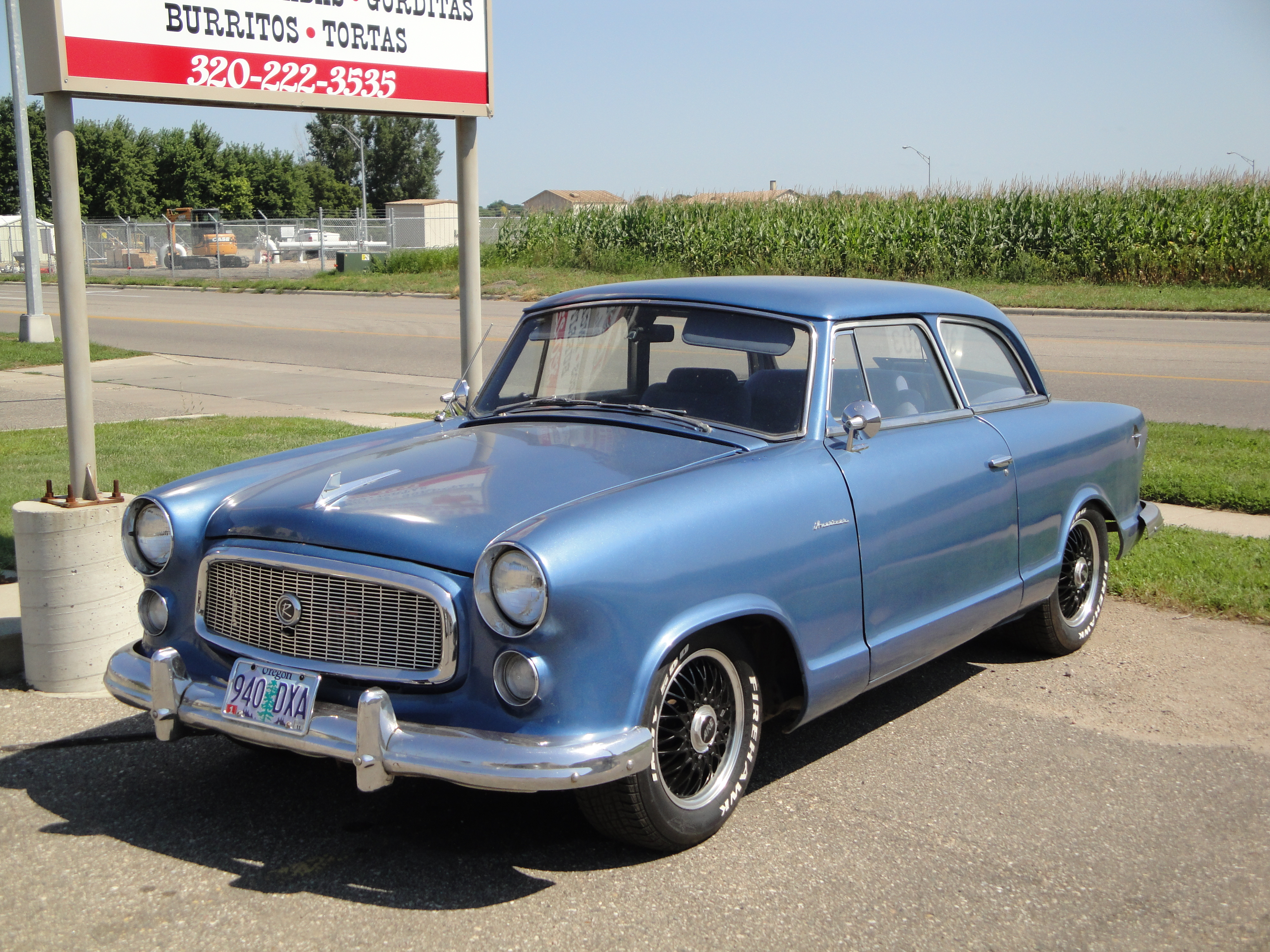
Anderson was best known for the 59 Rambler American (first generation).

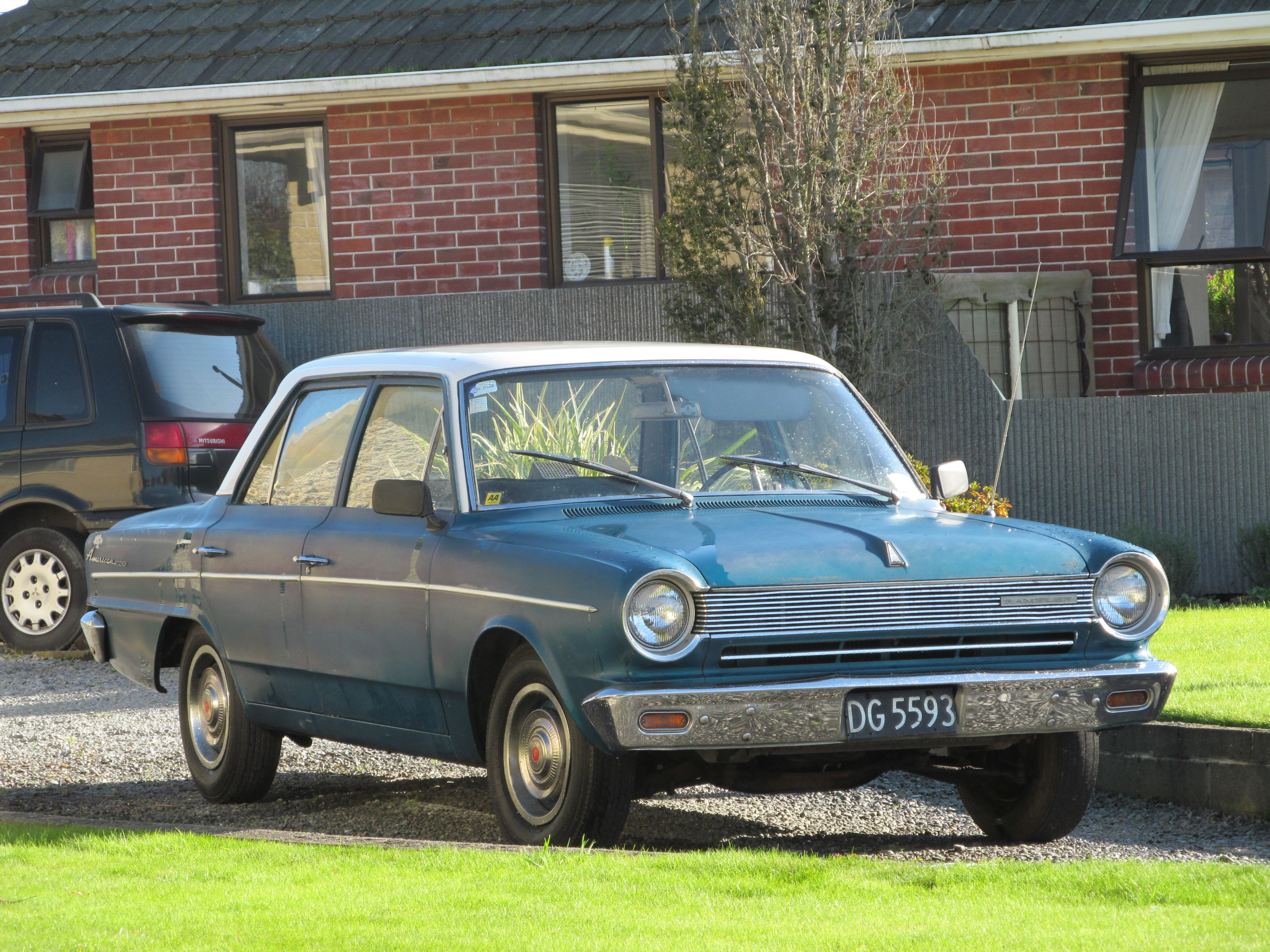
1964 Rambler American (third generation)

Before Anderson joined Nash, the company had relied on outside designers. Nevertheless, Nash retained Europe's best designer, the celebrated Battista Farina, as a consultant. Even with a new Nash Styling department in-house, the company continued to hire outside stylists (including Detroit-based William J. Flajole) to work on special projects such as the Nash Metropolitan.

Anderson was also responsible for the Pininfarina Nash of 1952. He revised the highly acclaimed Italian designer's contracted work for a more American look. However, the "Pininfarina" logo remained on the car because of its marketing value. After Nash and Hudson merged to form American Motors Corporation (AMC) in 1954, Anderson set up separate design studios for Nash, Hudson, and Rambler. He wanted to have some styling separation between the styling of the brands, but the new corporate organization involved changes so that design activities would be consolidated within AMC's headquarters.

Following the introduction of the landmark 1956 Rambler designed by Anderson, AMC dropped the Nash and Hudson brands to focus on the popular Rambler. The Rambler Styling Studio was given full responsibility for designing the company's cars and Farina was also released from his exclusive design agreement with AMC.

Anderson was largely responsible for some rather brilliant re-designs of existing AMC products during his tenure as AMC's Director of Styling. He is also blamed for the "V-Line Styling" on the 1956 Hudsons. The cars were described as the ugliest Hudsons in a generation. However, the 1956 and 1957 Hudson cars were designed by independent industrial designer Richard Arbib.

As Director of Automotive Styling, Anderson stated that "the personal vehicle, the compact car, and the large, long distance limousine will be the three major types to dominate tomorrow's market" with AMC aiming at the first two.

Other notable achievements included the revamped 1955 Nash Rambler that became the 1958–1960 Rambler American (first generation). As president of AMC George Romney made Anderson responsible "to 'resin' the entire 1961 line up while keeping the 1960 chassis." The compact-sized car was "considered too bland at the time, but Anderson "dis a tremendous job." With its 1961 restyle, Anderson gave the second generation Rambler American an entirely new look without any major re-tooling costs. This allowed AMC to make money in a very tight, competitive market. However, the 1961 Ambassador's "euro" facelift depressed the Rambler's premium model and was only used for one year. The third generation of the compact 1964 Rambler American was also unique. It used some of the larger 1963 Classic body components, and this was also Anderson's work. He was also involved in a two or three member "Advanced Styling" section, "a heaven for speculative thinking" about cars "five, ten, fifteen years out."

After asking to be named Vice President of Styling, and being rebuffed, Anderson resigned from the company effective December 1961 and retired to Mexico. His replacement as AMC's principal designer was Dick Teague.
