= Center console (automobile) =

Control-bearing surface facing a car's front seats

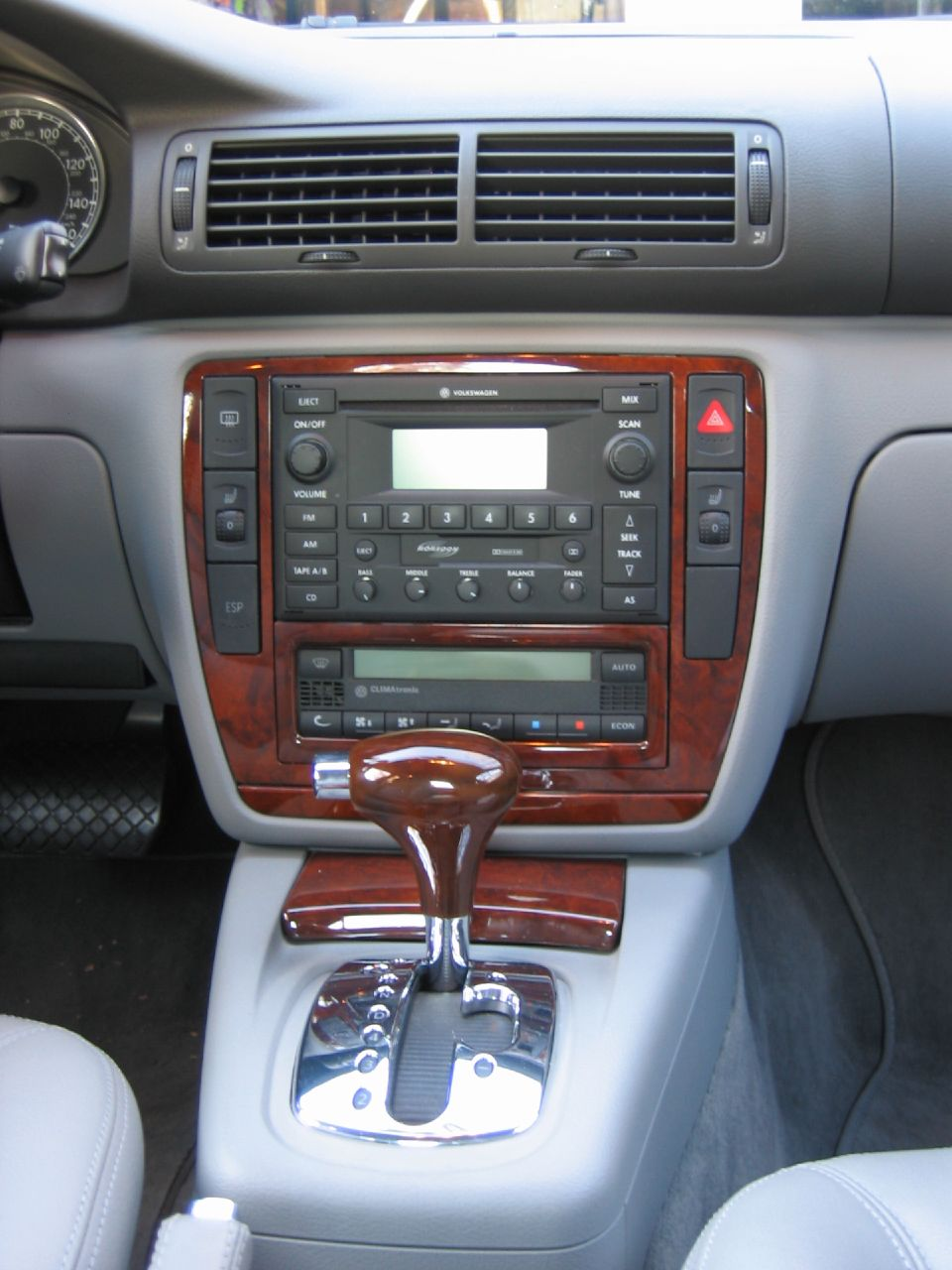
The center console of a Volkswagen Passat featuring a floor mounted gear selector.

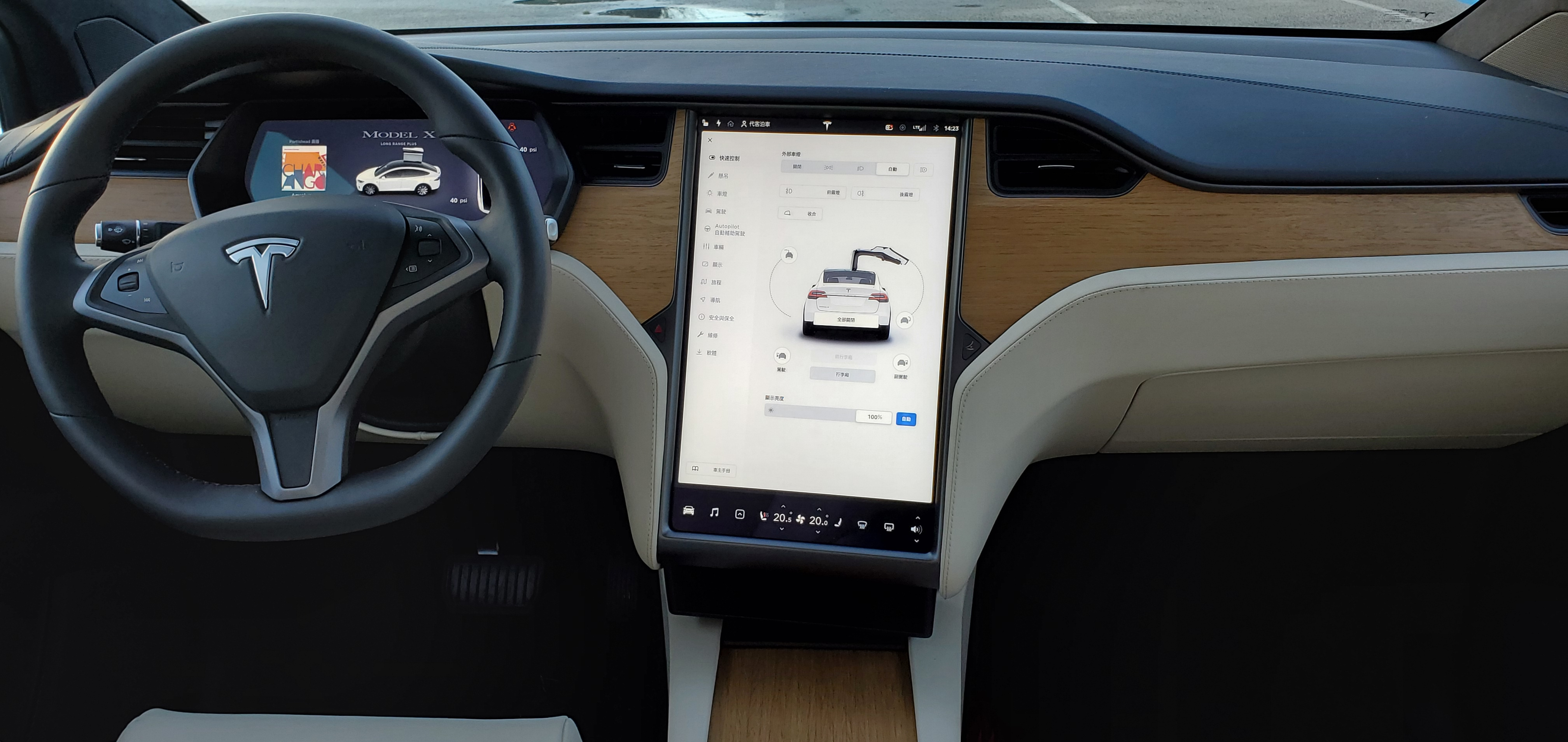
The center console of a Tesla Model X featuring a touch screen display.

The center console (American English) or centre console (Commonwealth English) in an automobile consists of the control-bearing surfaces in the center of the front of the vehicle interior. The term is applied to the area beginning in the dashboard and continuing beneath it, and often merging with the transmission tunnel which runs between the front driver's and passenger's seats of many vehicles.

Traditionally, vehicles with a gear stick have placed this control where the two areas of console and tunnel merge, or at the rear-most end of the console in front-wheel-drive vehicles without transmission tunnels. In some modern vehicles – particularly vans – the gear stick is mounted in the front, more vertical part of the center console to be within better reach of the driver without requiring a long stalk mounted on the steering column.

Increasingly, center consoles include a wide variety of storage compartments and cupholders, some of them (such as the Ford Flex Platinum Edition) with a refrigerator, in addition to the more traditional use as purely a surface for instrumentation and controls.

== Armrest console ==
The term "center console" (often "median console") often extends, as well, to the armrest between the driver's and passenger's seats, which in some vehicles (such as a Toyota RAV4) features one or more storage compartments under the armrest.

== Rear center console ==
Some cars include additional rear center console, which commonly includes entertainment and climate system controls (and possibly display screens and air vents), auxiliary power outlets, and sometimes window controls when these are not in the doors (for example, in the Ford Sierra). Another element is an ashtray, though this is now less common. On some cars and SUVs, the center console has heater vents for the comfort of rear passengers.

== See also ==
- Automotive navigation system
- Drop Stop
- Head unit
- In car entertainment
- List of auto parts
- Trip computer
