= Rambler Rebel =

Cars developed and produced by American Motors Corporation

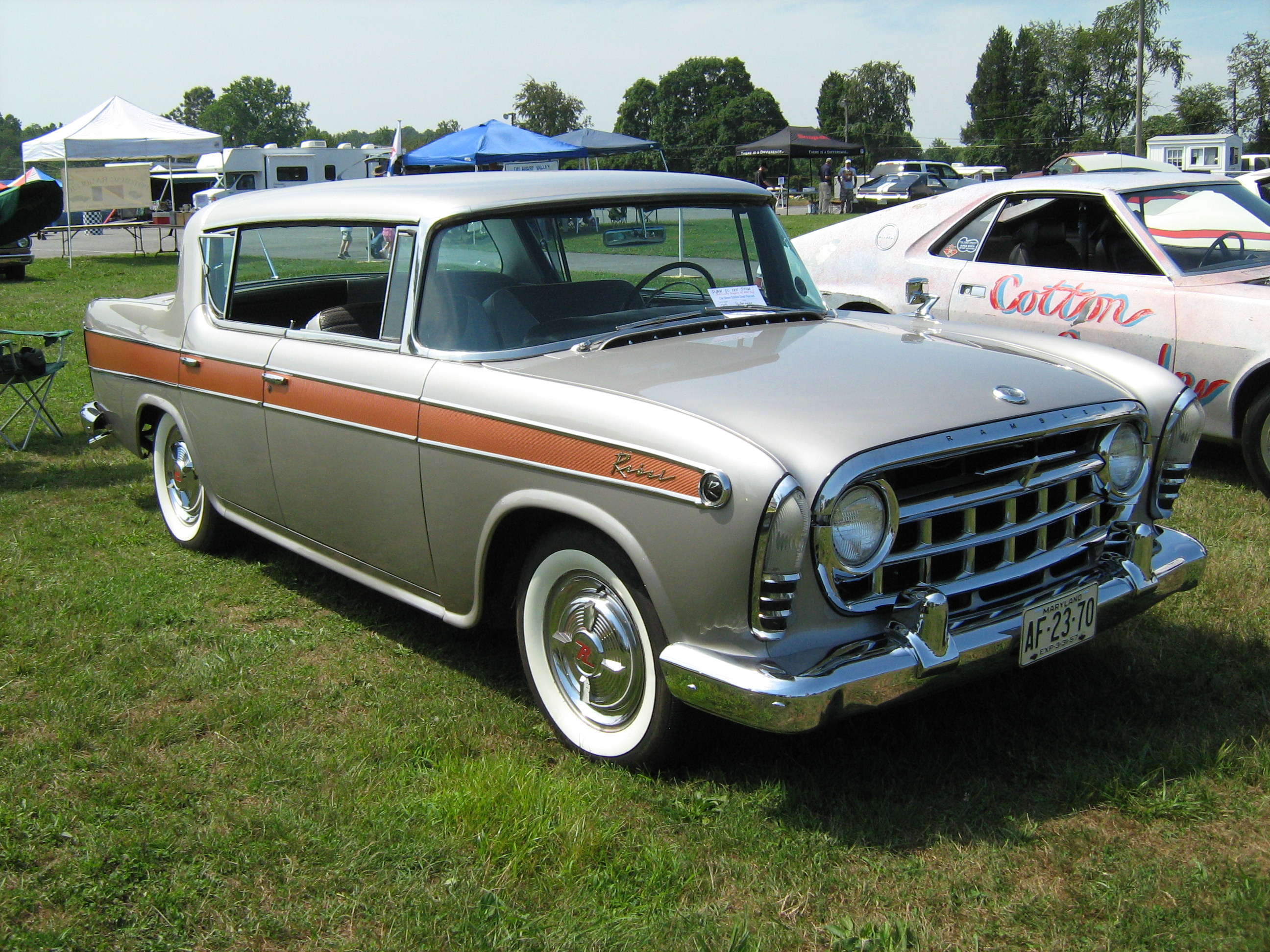
- 1957 Rambler Rebel

Overview
- Manufacturer: American Motors Corporation (AMC)
- Model years: 1957–1960; 1966–1967
- Assembly: United States: Kenosha, Wisconsin; Canada: Toronto, Ontario (Danforth plant: 1957); Canada: Brampton, Ontario (Brampton Assembly: 1966–1967); Belgium: Vilvoorde, Haren (RIB)

Body and chassis
- Class: Mid-size
- Layout: FR layout

Chronology
- Successor: AMC Rebel

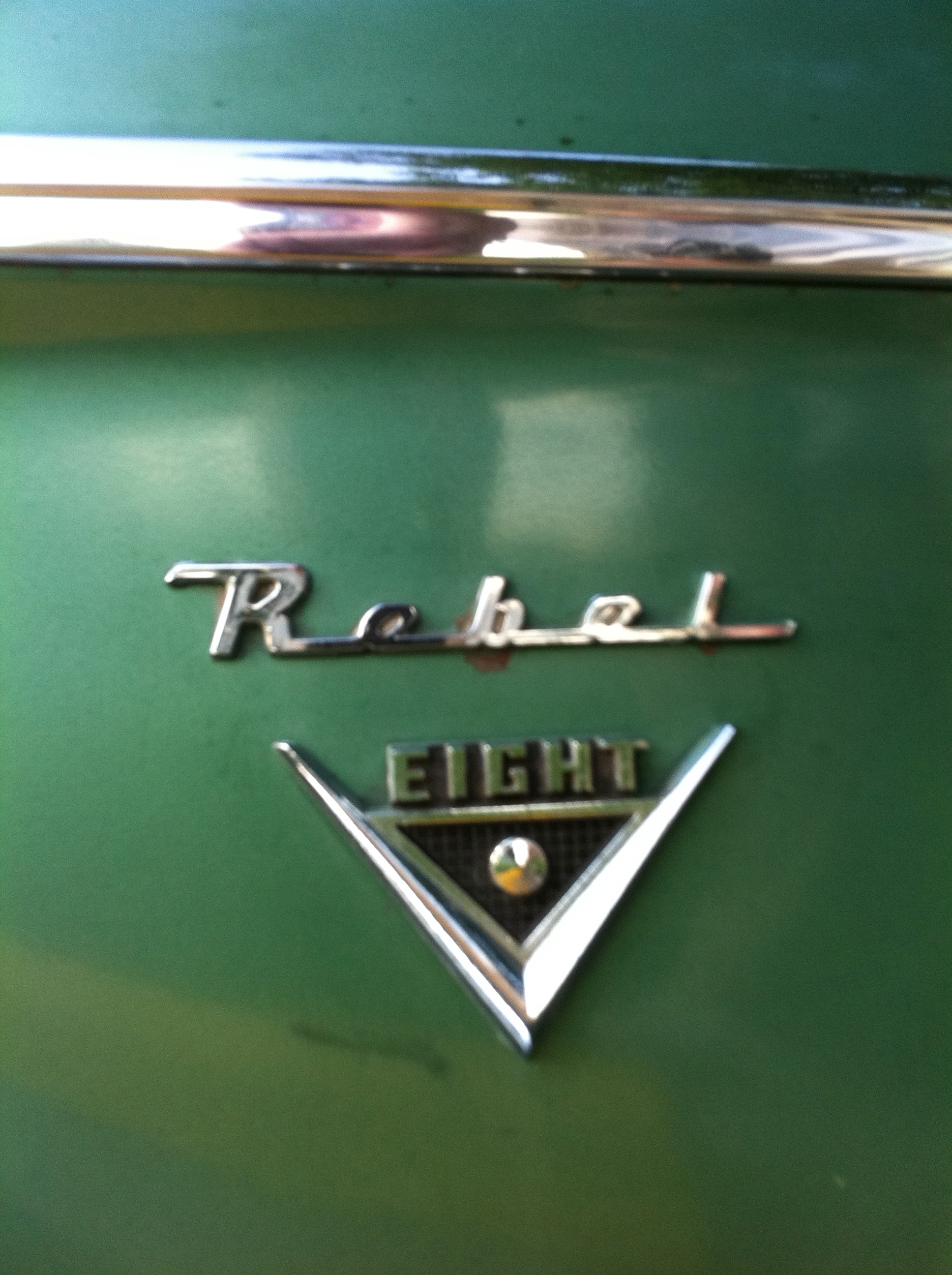
1960 Rebel V8 emblems

The Rambler Rebel is a series of automobiles manufactured by the American Motors Corporation (AMC) of Kenosha, Wisconsin, across two distinct periods: from 1957 through 1960 and again for the 1966 and 1967 model years.

The Rebel is significant in automotive history with its introduction for the 1957 model year as a singular, high-performance model. Available only as a four-door hardtop, it is recognized by many as having pioneering what would later be known as the "muscle car" market segment. It was among the earliest production vehicles to offer electronic fuel injection, showcasing AMC's technological initiatives.

The Rebel name was expanded for use on 1958 through 1960 Rambler models featuring a V8 engine as standard equipment. Available as sedans and station wagons in two trim levels, they largely mirrored the Rambler Six models. The Rebel nameplate was reintroduced for the 1966 model year as a premium, intermediate-sized two-door hardtop model. For the 1967 model year, AMC consolidated its newly designed intermediate line under the Rambler Rebel name. This change was pivotal for AMC. The long-standing "Rambler" marque was dropped from the intermediate-sized models, and they were rebranded as the AMC Rebel beginning with the 1968 model year.

Beyond its domestic production in Kenosha, Wisconsin, Rambler Rebel models were assembled at the former Nash Motors plant in Toronto, Canada, until the facility closed in July 1957. Canadian-market Ramblers were then imported from Kenosha until AMC established its new assembly plant in Brampton, Ontario, in December 1960. The Rebel's global reach included assembly in Belgium by Renault, in Australia by Australian Motor Industries (AMI), in New Zealand by Campbell Motor Industries, and in Argentina by Industrias Kaiser Argentina (IKA).

== Background ==
The Rambler Rebel's origins are intertwined with the strategic vision of George W. Romney, then president of AMC. Recognizing that, as a smaller, independent automaker, it could not effectively compete head-to-head with the domestic Big Three automakers (General Motors, Ford, and Chrysler), Romney adopted a differentiated strategy. His focus shifted towards producing cars smaller than the prevailing "standard" models in the American marketplace, emphasizing efficiency and cost-cutting measures. This approach aimed to carve out a niche for AMC, particularly as its "legacy" large-sized Nash and Hudson models were experiencing dwindling sales in a market dominated by overly large sedans and a few very small economy cars. The new Rambler line was intended by Romney "to split the market wide open with a mid-size model that featured aggressive styling and plenty of power," offering a compelling alternative to consumers.

A crucial component of this new direction was the development of AMC's V8 engine to compete with those offered by the other automakers. This initiative began in 1955 and was headed by AMC's chief engineer, Meade Moore, and supported by David Potter, who was with Kaiser-Frazer. The decision to manufacture an in-house V8 became imperative after AMC's component-sharing relationships with Packard were terminated by Romney, freeing the automaker to pursue in-house powertrain solutions.

Rapid development produced the 250 cu in (4.1 L) overhead-valve (OHV) V8 engine revealed in mid-1956. It first appeared in the Nash Ambassador Special and the Hudson Hornet Special. Despite being the smallest American V8 available then, its 190 hp (142 kW; 193 PS) output surpassed that of Chevrolet's contemporary two-barrel V8 offerings.

For the 1956 model year, the entire Rambler four-door line underwent a significant redesign. Stylists Edmund E. Anderson and Bill Reddig were responsible for its look, which included a distinctive "dramatic reverse-sloped C-pillar" – a design element that became a signature of AMC. They also incorporated the Pinin Farina-designed inboard, grille-mounted headlamps, a styling cue borrowed from the Nash-Healey sports car.

The redesign was carried into the 1957 model year. The 1957 Rambler Rebel was positioned as a special, high-performance model within the Rambler line. The Rebel showcased AMC's new V8 engine. It combined the lightweight, 108-inch (2,743 mm) wheelbase Rambler four-door hardtop body with AMC's larger, newly introduced 327 cu in (5.4 L) V8 engine. This combination created a vehicle that surprised the industry, becoming the first factory-produced intermediate-sized high-performance car, a critical precursor to the muscle car era that would explode in the 1960s. Its introduction in December 1956 as a "veritable supercar" immediately put AMC on the map as a contender in performance, even though the company was primarily known for its economy cars.

== First generation ==
First generation
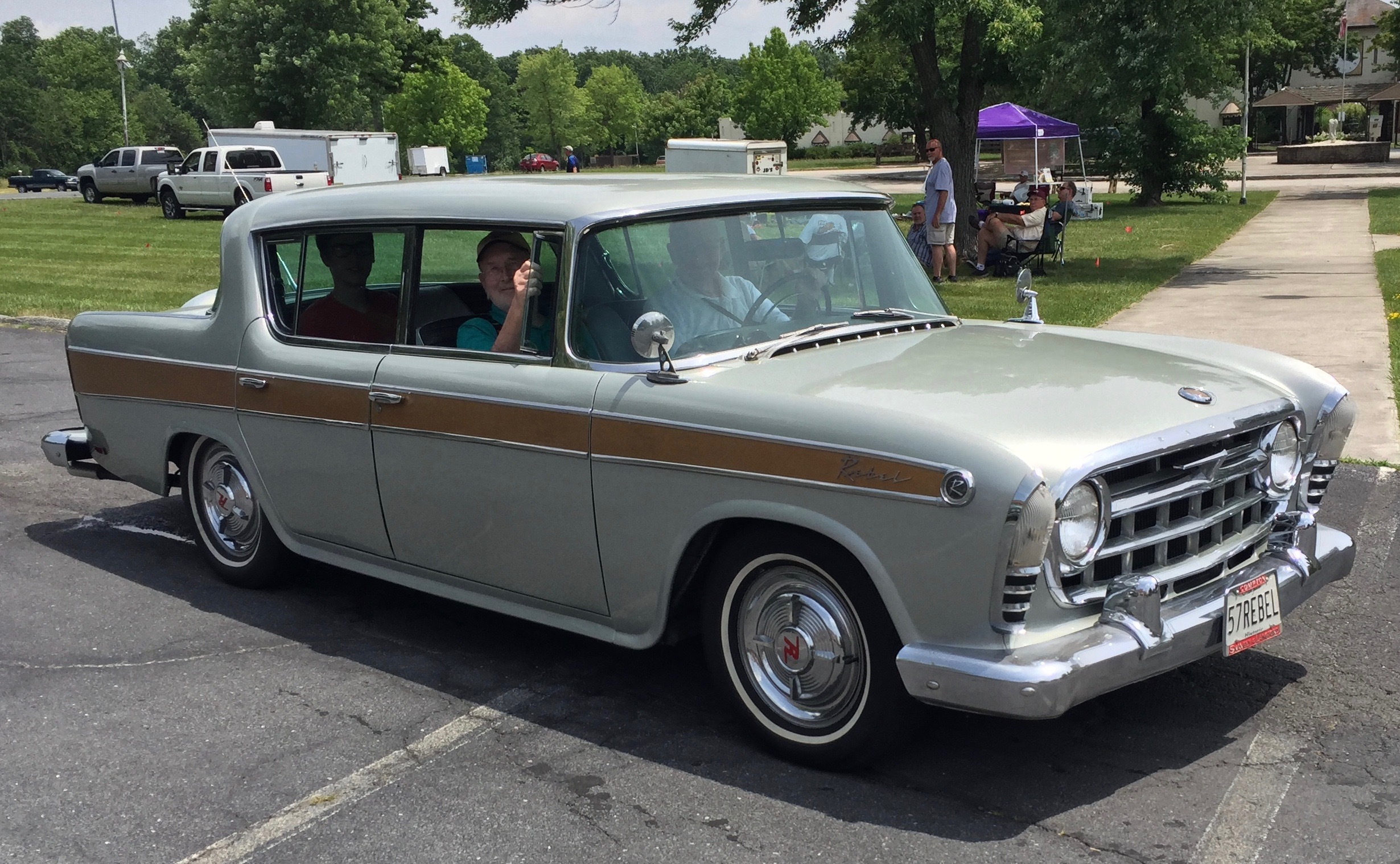
- 1957 Rambler Rebel

Overview
- Model years: 1957

Body and chassis
- Body style: 4-door hardtop sedan

Powertrain
- Engine: 327 cu in (5.4 L) V8
- Transmission: 3-speed manual with overdrive; 4-speed Hydra-Matic automatic

Dimensions
- Wheelbase: 108 in (2,743 mm)
- Length: 191.14 in (4,855 mm); 198.89 in (5,052 mm) with optional continental tire mount
- Width: 71.32 in (1,812 mm)
- Height: 58.48 in (1,485 mm)

=== 1957 ===
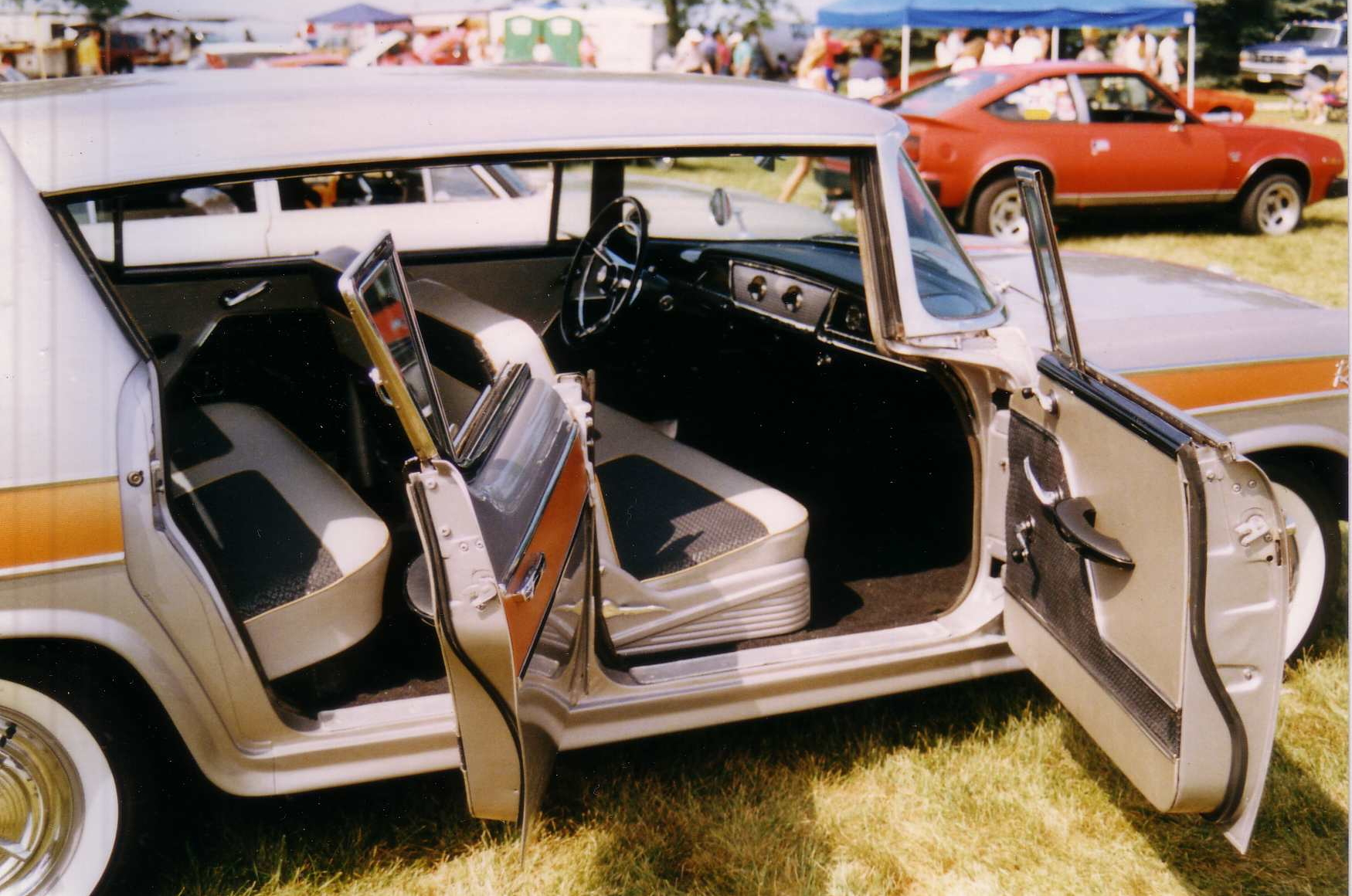
All 1957 Rambler Rebels were 4-door hardtops (no "B" pillar)

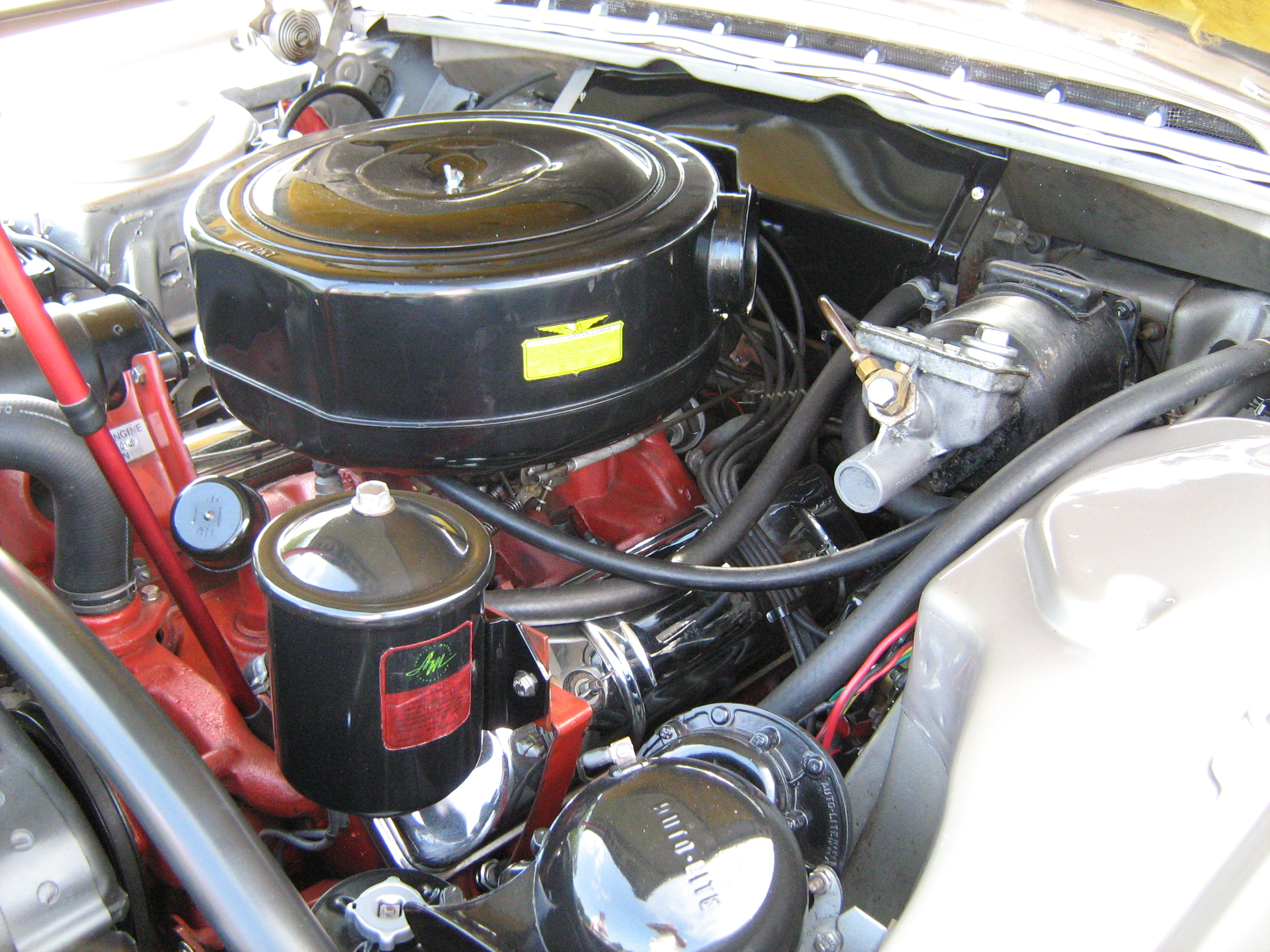
The AMC 327 V8 engine in a 1957 Rambler Rebel

American Motors surprised most observers with the December 1956 introduction of the Rambler Rebel – "a veritable supercar". The new 1957 model debuted as a high-performance vehicle that combined AMC's lightweight 108-inch (2,743 mm) wheelbase Rambler four-door hardtop body with AMC's newly introduced 327 cu in (5.4 L) V8 engine. This made it the first-time that a large block V8 was installed in a mid-size car in the post-World War II marketplace. General Motors, Ford, and Chrysler offered no intermediate-sized cars whatsoever.

Although AMC was best known for their reliable economy cars, this special model came with a bigger engine than anything found at Chevrolet, Ford, or Plymouth—the Rambler's most popular competitors at that time. The Rebel's US$2,786 MSRP base price ($31,937 in 2025 dollars) was economical for the amount of power provided. It was the fastest stock American sedan, according to Motor Trend.

All Rebels came with a manual (with overdrive unit) or GM's four-speed Hydra-Matic automatic transmission, as well as other performance enhancements such as a dual exhaust system, heavy-duty suspension with Gabriel (brand) shock absorbers, and front sway bar. The Rebel was capable of 0 to 60 mph (0-97 km/h) acceleration in 7.5 seconds with its standard 255 hp (190 kW; 259 PS) carbureted engine. The car's light monocoque (unibody) construction afforded a power-to-weight ratio of about 13 pounds per horsepower, a better ratio than other 1957 model year automobiles and a contrast to Volkswagen's 45.

The Rebel's engine also differed from the 327s installed in the 1957 Ambassador and Hudson Hornet models because it used mechanical valve lifters and a higher compression ratio. Since both engines were rated at 255 hp, it is probable that the Rebel's was underrated.

Power steering and power drum brakes were also standard, as on all Rambler Custom models. The car was available only in silver metallic paint accented with gold anodized aluminum inserts along the sides. Padded dashboards and visors, rear child-proof door locks, and seat belts were all optional. A total of 1,500 Rebels were produced in 1957. Integrated air conditioning system, the All Weather Eye was a $345 option.

The Rebel is considered to be a precursor of the muscle cars (rear-wheel drive mid-size cars with powerful V8 engines and special trims) that became so popular in the 1960s. It also foretold that muscle-type performance would be included among AMC's models.

=== Fuel injection option ===
The Bendix Electrojector electronic manifold injection (EFI) was to be optional on the 1957 Rambler Rebel with a flashy introduction at the Daytona Beach Road Course trials. The Rebel's Electrojector equipped engine was rated at 288 bhp (215 kW). This was to have been the first mass-produced engine with a transistorized "brain box" fuel injection system. A Rambler Rebel with the optional EFI was tested by Motor Trend, and they recorded this sedan going faster from a standing start than the 1957 Chevrolet Corvette with mechanical fuel injection.

The Bendix system's public debut in December 1956 was followed by a March 1957 price bulletin listing it as a US$395 option, but because of supplier difficulties, EFI Rebels would only be available after June 15. This was to have been the first production EFI engine, but Electrojector's teething problems meant only pre-production cars were so equipped: thus, very few cars so equipped were ever sold, and none were made available to the public. The Rambler's EFI was more advanced than the mechanical types then appearing on the market and the engines ran fine in warm weather, but encountered difficulty with starting in cooler temperatures. As a result, all of the production Rebels used a four-barrel carburetor. Nevertheless, the EFI option remained in the published owner's manual.

== Second generation ==
Second generation
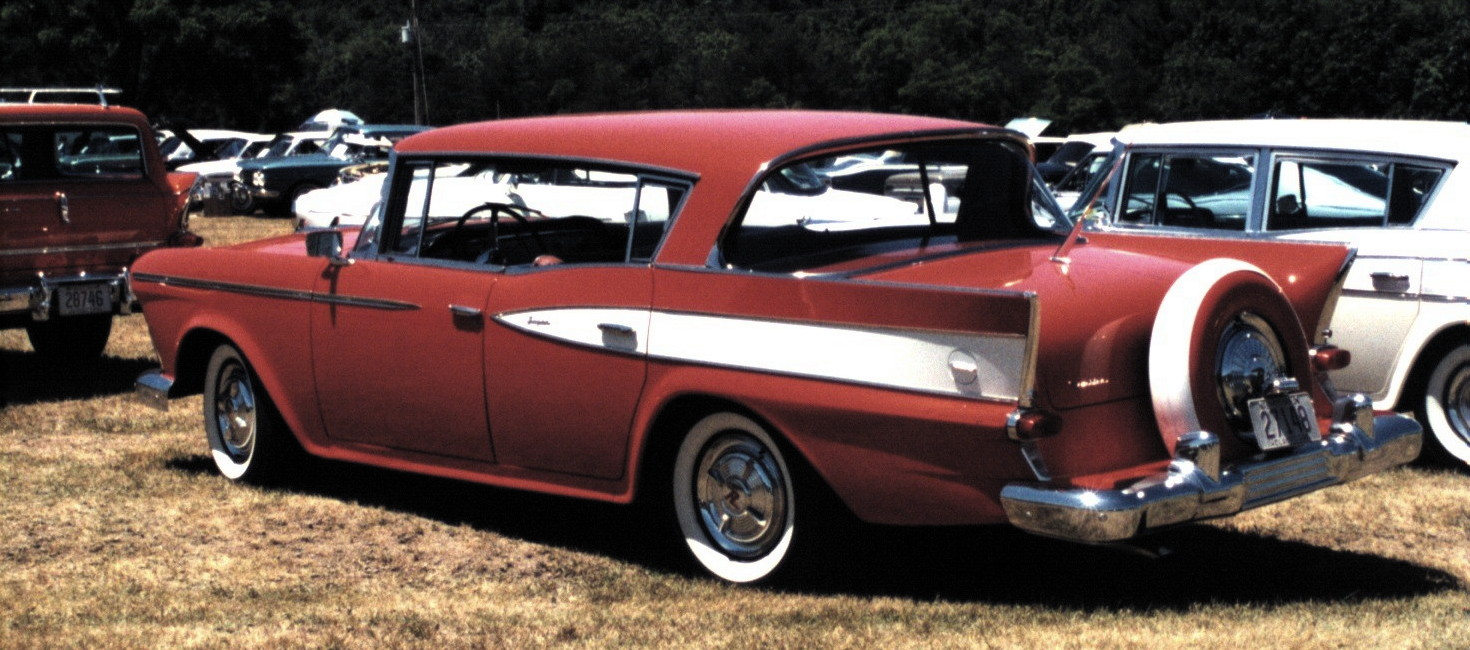
- 1959 Rambler Rebel 4-door hardtop

Overview
- Also called: IKA 5829-2 (RA)
- Model years: 1958–1959

Body and chassis
- Body style: 4-door sedan; 4-door wagon

Powertrain
- Engine: 250 cu in (4.1 L) V8; 327 cu in (5.4 L) V8

Dimensions
- Wheelbase: 108 in (2,743 mm)

=== 1958 ===
For the 1958 model year, the Rebel name returned, but no longer with the 327 engine. Rather than identifying a specialty model, the name was applied to all Ramblers powered by AMC's 250 cu in (4.1 L) V8 engine. Rebel came with a four-barrel carburetor and dual exhausts rated at 215 hp (160 kW; 218 PS) with 260 lb⋅ft (353 N⋅m) of torque. The 327 engine was made standard in the more luxurious Rambler Ambassador models. The 1958 Rebel lineup encompassed six models: Super or Custom trimmed four-door sedans and Cross Country station wagons, plus a base Deluxe four-door sedan that was reserved for fleet sales. A four-door hardtop in the top-line Custom trim was now Rebel's sole pillarless model.

These Rebels were no longer the muscle car of 1957, but did offer more power than regular Rambler models. A test by Motor Trend concluded "the V8 powered Rebel is now able to reach a true 60-mph from a standstill in an estimated 12.0 seconds"—significantly slower than the limited-production 1957 Rebel, and this was pretty good for that era.

The 1958 Rambler Rebel and Rambler Six shared revised styling with a new grille, front fenders containing quad headlamps, as well as a new hood design while the rear received new fenders with impressive tailfins. A chrome accent spear began on the front end with another that ran down the body side. The Station wagons were a popular body style.

=== 1959 ===
The 1959 model year Rambler Rebels featured hoods without ornaments, a new full-width grille with large inset turn signal lamps, bumpers, and bumper guards that reduced the overall length by 1.6 inches (41 mm), a thinner roof panel look with narrower C-pillars, windshield and rear window slanted at a greater angle reducing wind resistance, simpler bodyside trim, and restyled rear doors and fenders with a smooth line to the smaller tailfins. Car Life magazine called the 1959 Rambler "one of the most attractive cars on the road".

All Rambler Rebels benefitted from bigger brakes, improved automatic transmission controls, and numerically lower axle ratios for improved fuel economy. A new option was adjustable headrests. The 1959 Rebel came with a four-barrel carburetor and dual exhausts rated at 215 hp (160 kW) with 260 lb⋅ft (353 N⋅m) of torque.

== Third generation ==
Third generation
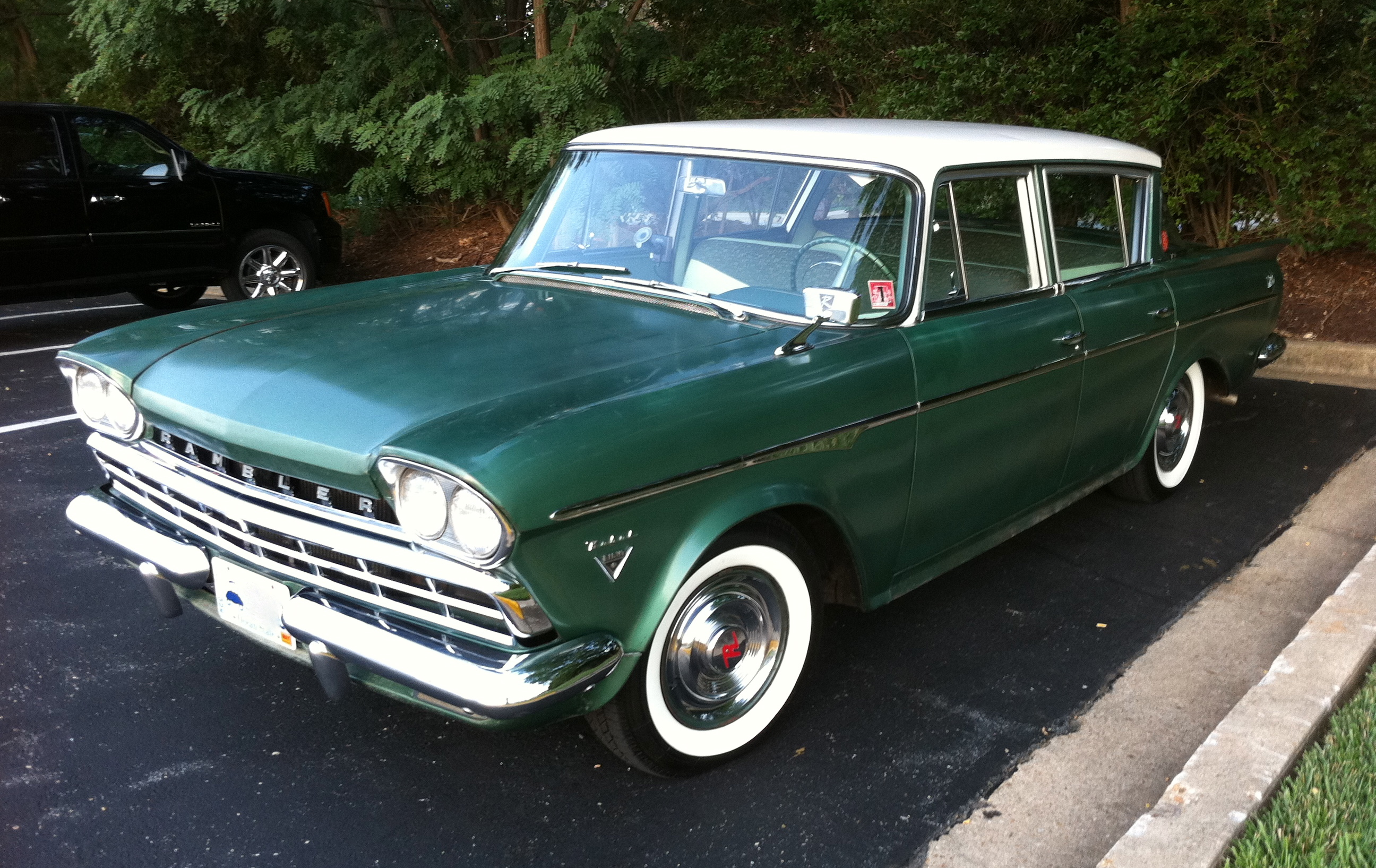
- 1960 Rambler Rebel V8 sedan

Overview
- Also called: IKA 5829-2 (RA)
- Model years: 1960

Body and chassis
- Body style: 4-door sedan; 4-door wagon

Dimensions
- Wheelbase: 108 in (2,743 mm)
- Length: 185.9 in (4,722 mm)
- Width: 72.32 in (1,837 mm)
- Height: 57.1 in (1,450 mm)

=== 1960 ===
American Motors downplayed the Rambler Rebel name in 1960. Rather than focus on the separate Six and Rebel models, as in previous years, the emphasis was placed on the Rambler name and the trim levels, with the notation that each series was offered with "Economy 6" or "Rebel V8" engines. The 1960 model year saw the Rebel available with a lower compression 2-barrel version rated at 200 hp (149 kW).

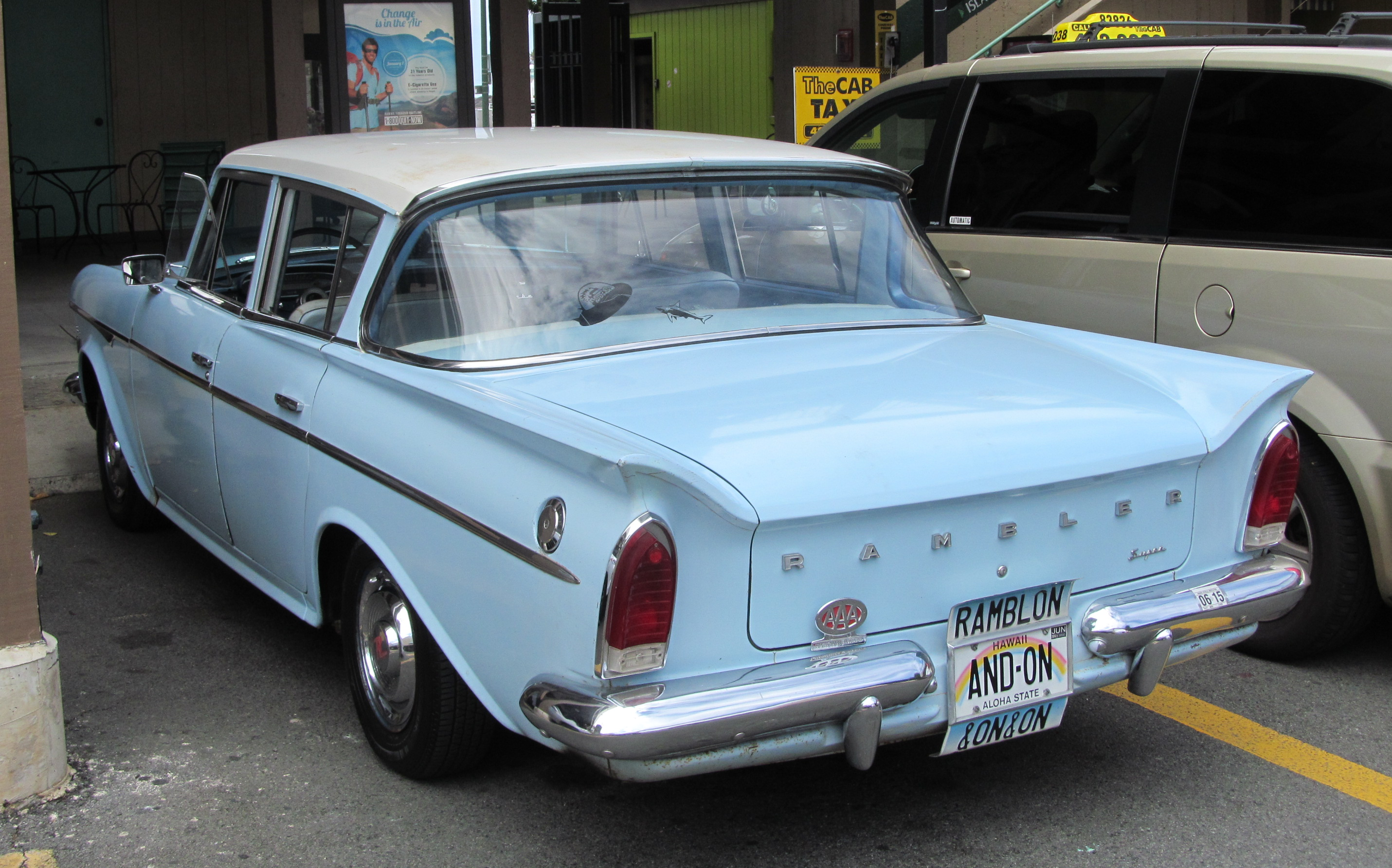
1960 Rambler Rebel Super V8

The Rambler Rebel was all new, but retained the same styling concept. The front end featured a full-width die-cast grille, while the two-piece front and rear bumpers were promoted to cut repair costs. The C-pillars were made narrower and the tail fins were now smaller.

Station wagons with two rows of seats came with a conventional tailgate (roll-down rear window and drop-down gate) while three-row models received a new side-hinged door. All station wagons included a standard roof rack. A big feature was the 80 cubic feet (2.27 m^{3}) of space, compared for example to the much larger-sized Oldsmobile station wagons that offered only 80 cu ft (2.27 m^{3}) of cargo room. Among the 17 different station wagons that were marketed by AMC for 1960, the Rambler Six Cross Country Super was the most popular.

After the 1960 model year all of the 108-inch (2,743 mm) wheelbase models took the Rambler Classic name.

== Fourth generation ==
Fourth generation
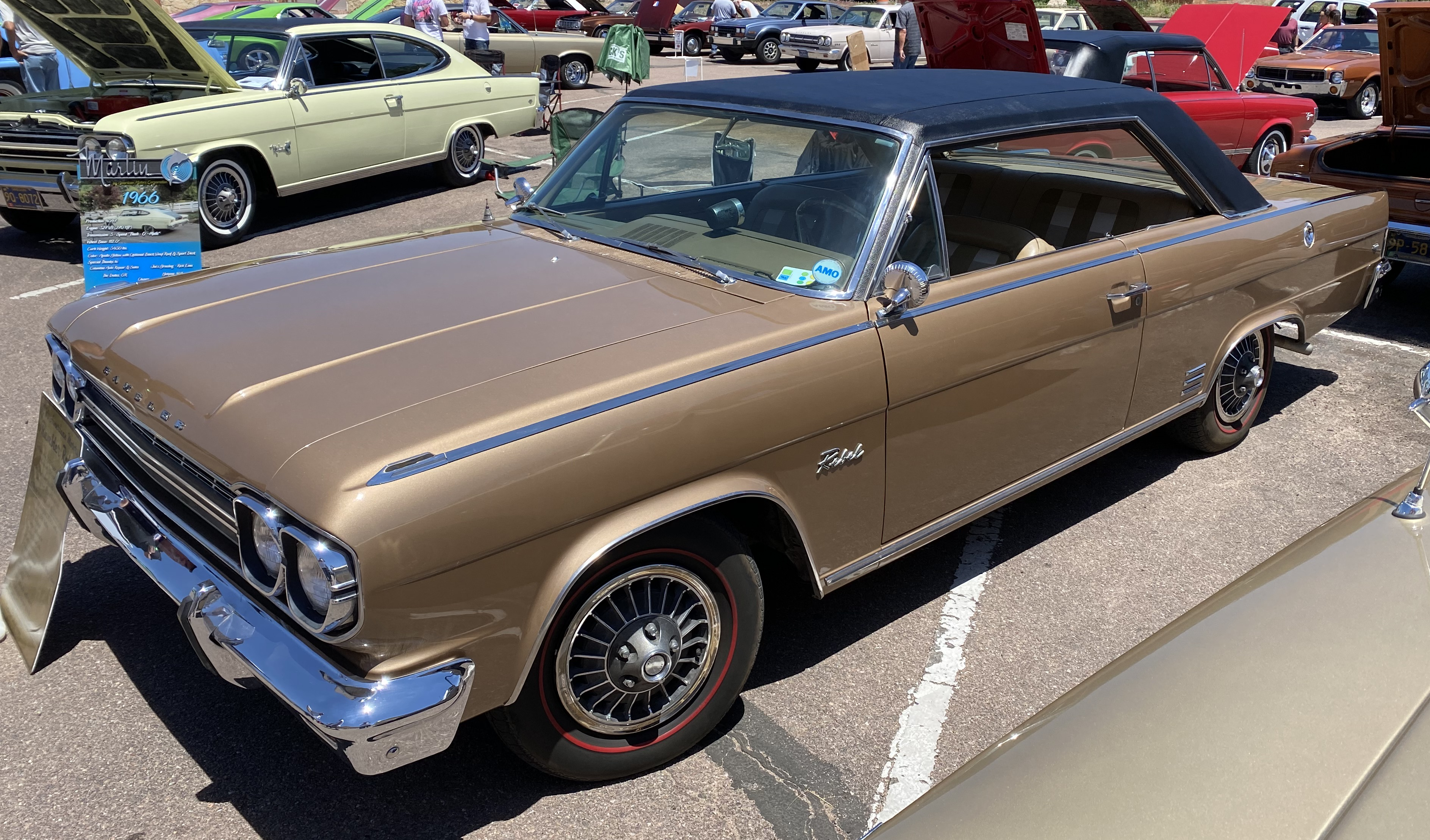
- 1966 Rambler Rebel 2-door hardtop

Overview
- Model years: 1966

Body and chassis
- Body style: 2-door hardtop coupe

Dimensions
- Wheelbase: 112 in (2,845 mm)

=== 1966 ===
The Rebel name reappeared for the 1966 model year on a version of the Rambler Classic two-door hardtop (pillar-less body style).

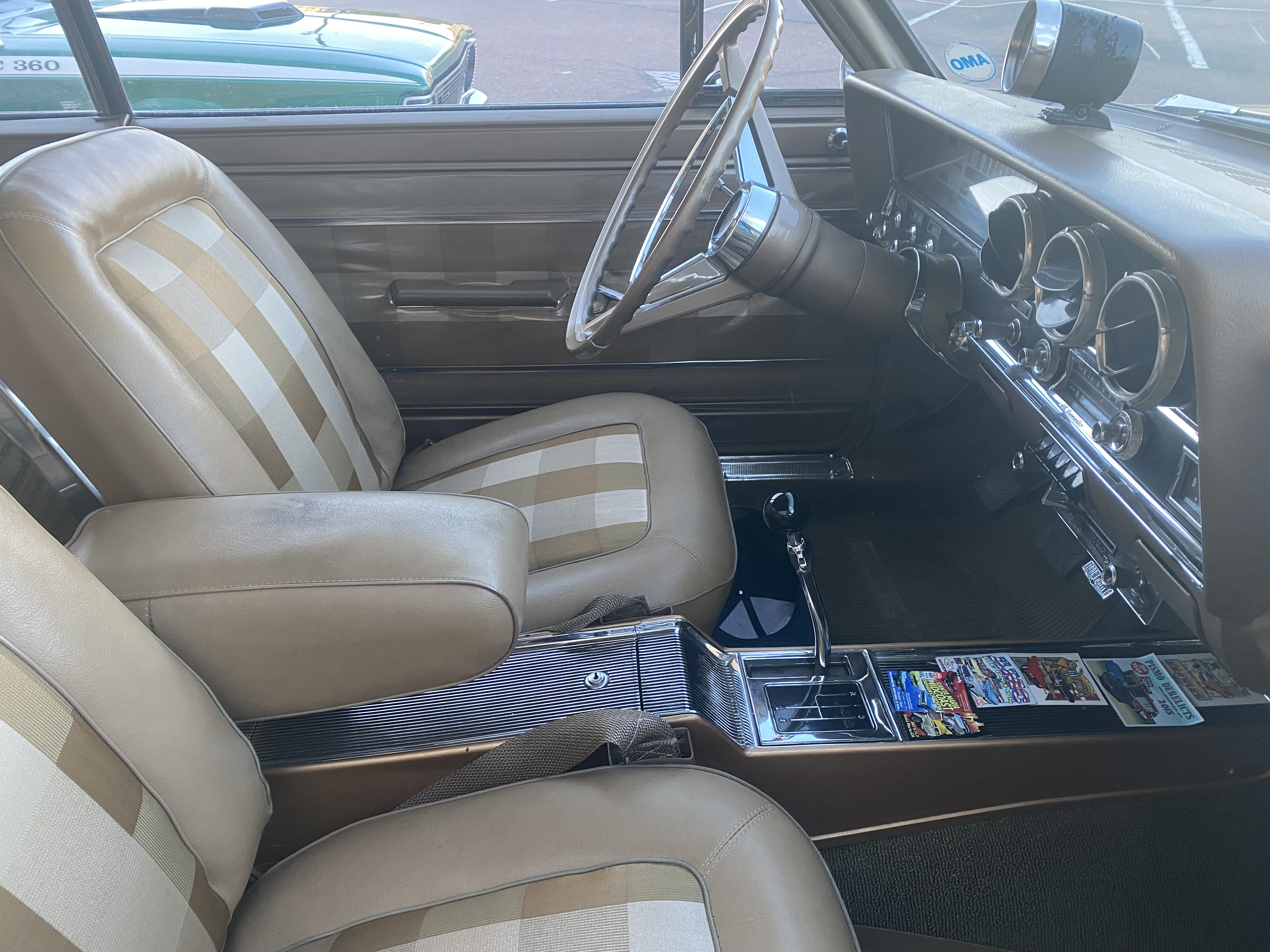
1966 Rambler Rebel interior with console-mounted 4-speed

This model featured bucket seats, special interior and exterior trim, as well as a revised roofline. The base price of this top-of-the-line model was US$2,523 with the standard 232 cu in (3.8 L) I6; however, more sports-oriented options were available that included a new-for-1966 Borg-Warner T-10 four-speed manual floor-mounted transmission, a dash-mounted tachometer, as well as the 327 cu in (5.4 L) V8 producing 270 bhp (201 kW), which was only an extra $65.

This effort moved AMC once again toward the muscle car market segment; however, the Rebel was criticized for its antiquated torque tube suspension system. The Rebel also suffered from Rambler's "economy" reputation. Nevertheless, the Rebel model offered the recipe common to most of the early muscle cars. Standard features included reclining front bucket seats with a center armrest, an electric clock, chrome trim on the headliner, and special exterior badges with trim ahead of the rear wheel openings. Just like other muscle models, the Rebel was available with a powerful engine, disk brakes, and special interior trim. However, the Rebel did not include a non-functional hood scoop often found on competing cars.

Marketing included print advertisements in popular magazines headlining "I'm a Rebel!" and comparing the Rambler to the Chevrolet Chevelle, Plymouth Belvedere, and Ford Fairlane. The Rebel's styling offset the marketing focus and "youthful" intentions at the time, but AMC "would soon try to change with the upcoming Javelin and AMX."

The total production of the 1966 Rambler Rebel was 7,512. The year was in the early stages of the "muscle car wars," and this model is considered to be the last real performance-oriented Rambler Rebel.

== Fifth generation ==
Fifth generation
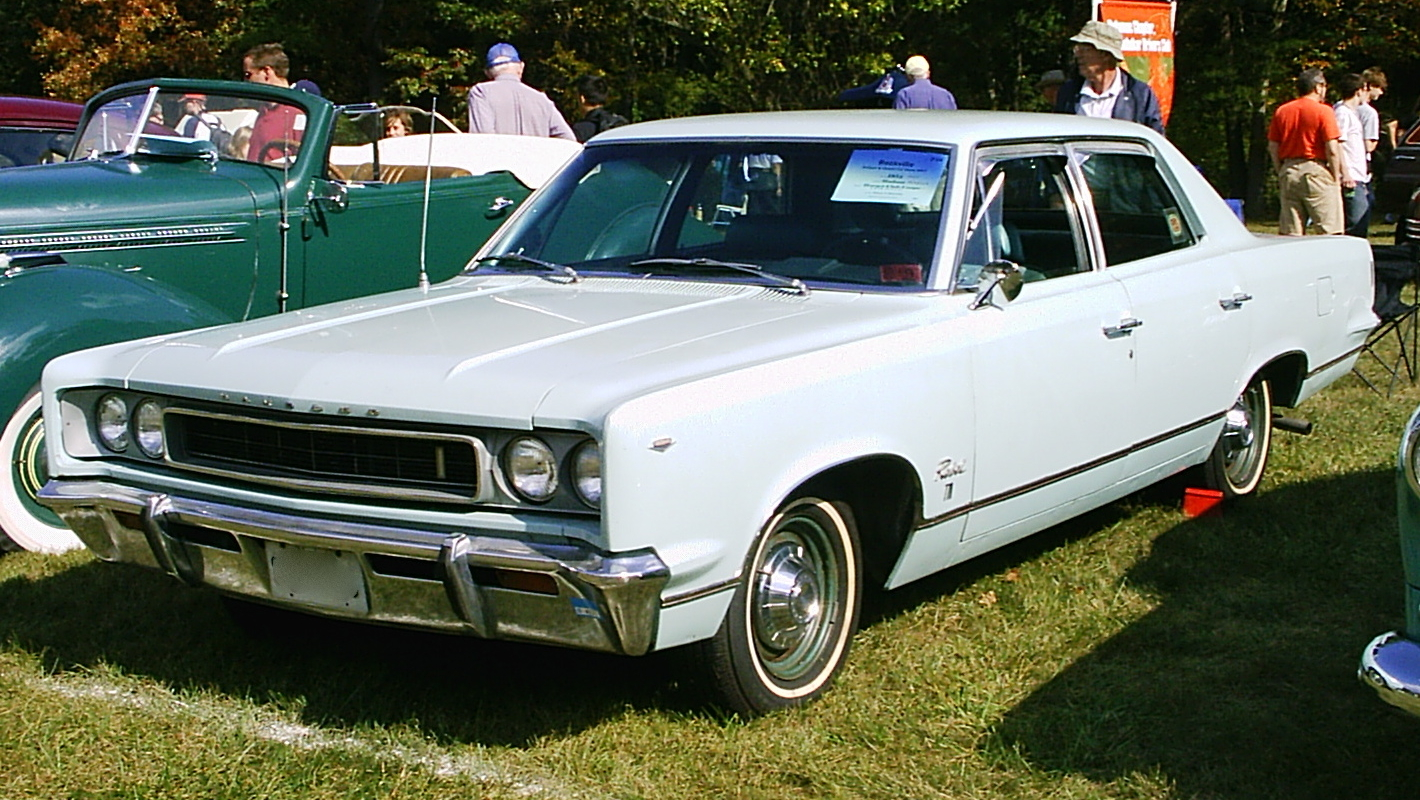
- 1967 Rambler Rebel 4-door sedan

Overview
- Also called: American Motors Rebel; Rambler-Renault Rebel
- Model years: 1967–1970
- Assembly: United States: Kenosha, Wisconsin (Kenosha Engine); Australia: Port Melbourne (AMI); Belgium: Haren (RIB); Canada: Brampton, Ontario; Costa Rica: San José (Purdy Motors); Mexico: Mexico City (VAM); New Zealand: Thames (CMI); Peru: Lima (I.A.P.S.A)

Body and chassis
- Body style: 2-door convertible; 2-door coupe; 2-door hardtop; 4-door sedan; 4-door station wagon

Dimensions
- Wheelbase: 114 in (2,896 mm)

=== 1967 ===
For the 1967 model year, all of AMC's intermediates took the Rambler Rebel name. As part of his plan since 1965 to shed AMC of its "economy car" image, CEO Roy Abernethy ordered a completely new design from the predecessor models. Abernethy's objective was to position the 1967 Rebel and Ambassador designs on an equal basis with competitive models marketed by the Big Three's volume brands.

The new Rebels were bigger and rode on a longer 114-inch (2,896 mm) wheelbase allowing for more passenger space and cargo capacity. The new styling featured sweeping rooflines with more glass area, as well as a smooth, rounded "coke-bottle" body design.

The Rebel was now available not only in four-door sedan, four-door station wagon, and two-door hardtop versions, but also for 1967 as two-door sedan (coupé) with a thin B-pillar and flip out rear side windows, as well as a convertible. The new coupe was only available in the lowest trim level, but was design was marketed as a "Sports Sedan" as it is identical in style to the hardtop including frameless door windows. The convertible body style included a power-operated top that featured an all-new "fastback" profile with a "split stack" folding roof mechanism with concealed side rails that did not intrude into the backseat area, thus offering room for three adult passengers in the rear. The station wagons now had featured a new second-row seat mechanism folding it down and forward to offer 91 cubic feet (2.58 m^{3}) of flat-floored cargo space with the tailgate opening also made wider and taller than the 1966 versions. The Rebel models were similar to the senior Ambassador in that they shared the same basic unit-body (platform) aft of the cowl. Rebels came in the base 550 and deluxe 770 models, with a high-line SST available only as a two-door hardtop.

Traditional Rambler economy came standard with the redesigned Rebels featuring six-cylinder engines and overdrive transmissions. However, the Rebels were upgraded in numerous areas including a new four-link, trailing-arm rear suspension system. American Motors also introduced advanced V8 engines, and Rebels could now be turned "into a decent budget-priced muscle car" with the new 343 cu in (5.6 L).

==== Grant Rambler Rebel ====
American Motors expanded its racing activities in 1967 by partnering with automotive performance parts company, Grant Industries, to build the Grant Rambler Rebel, a "Funny Car" racer to compete in the National Hot Rod Association (NHRA) X/S (Experimental Stock) and Super Experimental Stock classes. The relationship provided both companies with national exposure and publicity. The racing Rebel had an altered wheelbase 122-inch (3,099 mm) with chrome moly steel tube chassis and powered by the 343 cu in (5.6 L) AMC V8 engine that was bored and stroked to 438 cu in (7.2 L). The engine featured a GMC 6-71 blower and Enderle fuel injection, producing 1,200 hp (895 kW; 1,217 PS) at up to 9000 rpm on a mixture of alcohol and nitromethane. In 1967, Hayden Proffitt drove the Rebel on the quarter-mile (402 m) from a standing start in 8.11 seconds at 180.85 mph (291.0 km/h).

=== 1968 ===
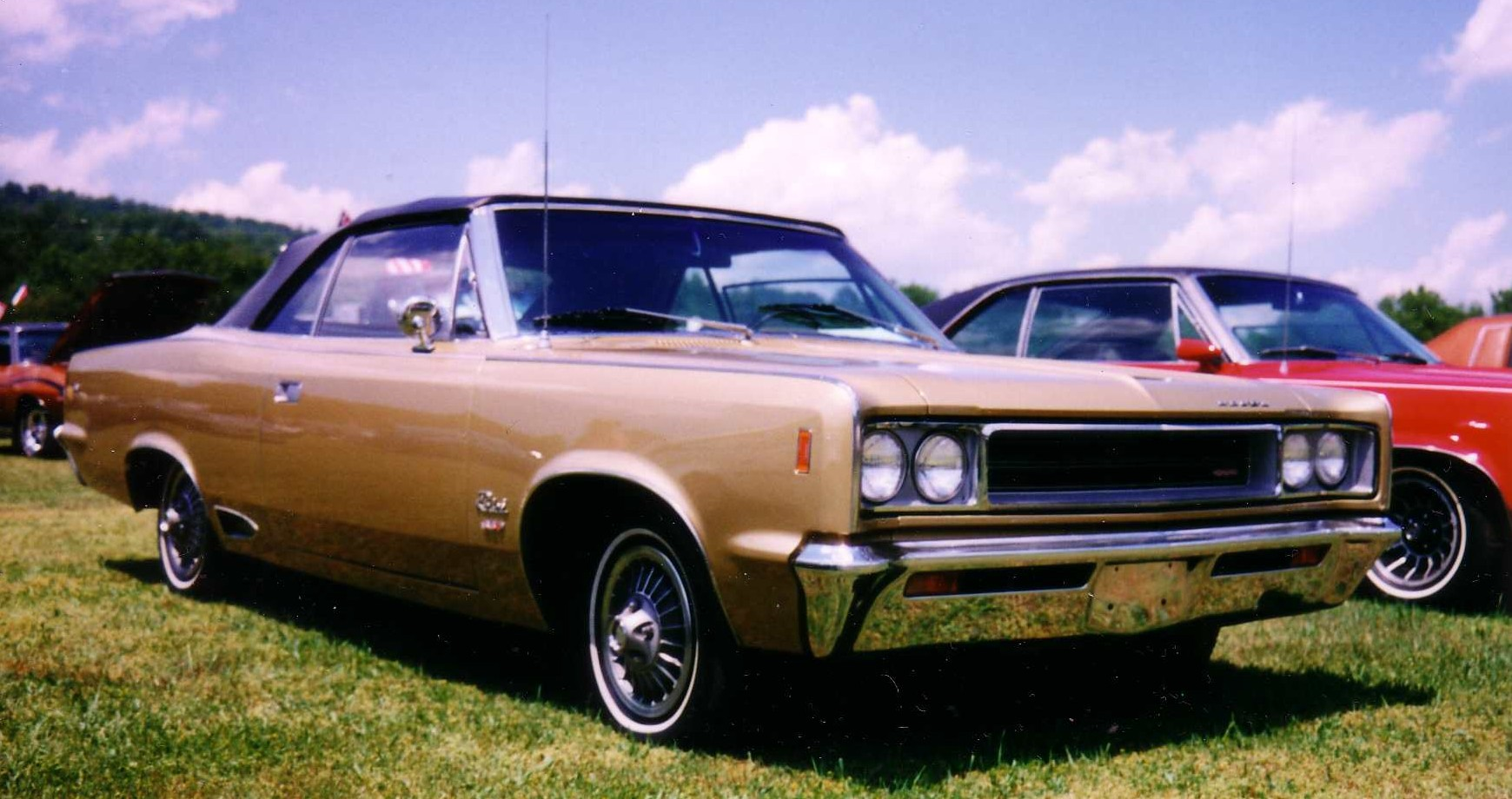
1968 AMC Rebel SST convertible

For the 1968 model year, the historic "Rambler" marque was dropped and the line was named AMC Rebel. The cars received only a modest restyle, but incorporated new safety features mandated by the U.S. National Highway Traffic Safety Administration (NHTSA), engine control systems to reduce unburned hydrocarbon and carbon monoxide emissions, and the availability of the "AMX" 315 hp (235 kW; 319 PS) 390 cu in (6.4 L) V8 engine.

Declining sales of convertibles in general during the late 1960s saw discontinuance of this body style by AMC after only 823 were built in 1968.

Production of Rebels continued through the 1970 model year until replaced by the similar AMC Matador for the 1971 model year.

=== Production ===
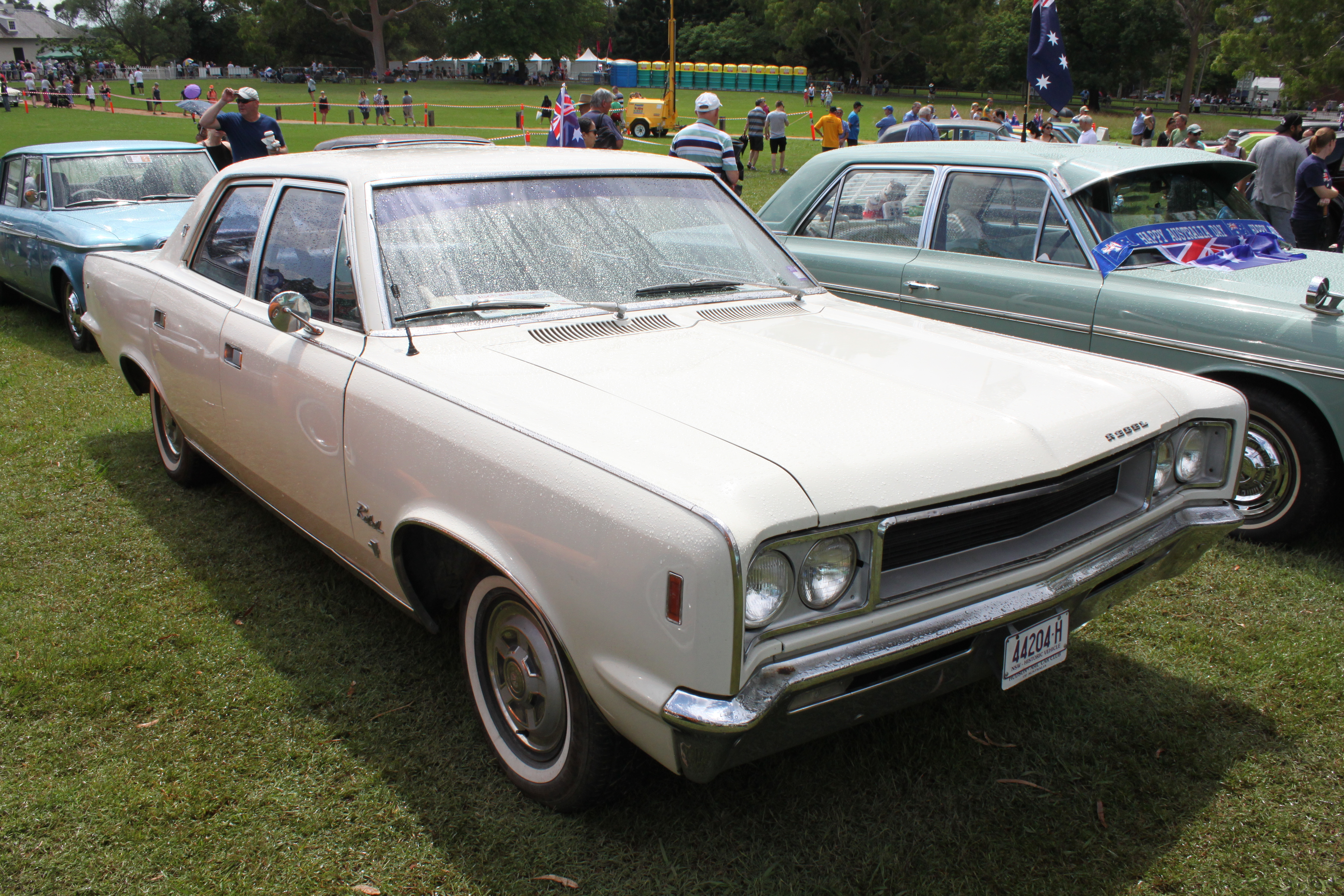
1968 Rambler Rebel built in Australia

Fifth-generation Rebels were built at AMC's main assembly plant in Kenosha, Wisconsin and in its Canadian Brampton Assembly in Brampton, Ontario.

Foreign assembly from Semi Knock Down (SKD) kits was undertaken by Australian Motor Industries (AMI) in Australia and by Campbell Motor Industries in Thames, New Zealand and from Complete Knock Down (CKD) kits by Renault in Europe (for the 1967 model only) as well as by Vehiculos Automotores Mexicanos (VAM) in Mexico.

Export markers retained the Rambler marque for the entire run of Rebels as well as for the replacement Matador.

== See also ==
- Rambler Six—the companion 1957–1960 models with I6 engines
- AMC Rebel—the successor 1967–1970 models

== Resources ==
- Conde, John A. (1987). The American Motors Family Album. American Motors Corporation. OCLC 3185581.
- Foster, Patrick (2004). AMC Cars: 1954–1987, An Illustrated History. Motorbooks International. ISBN 978-1-58388-112-5.
- Foster, Patrick (2013). American Motors Corporation: The Rise and Fall of America's Last Independent Automaker. Motorbooks International. ISBN 978-0-7603-4425-5.
- Foster, Patrick (1993). The Last Independent. Motorbooks International. ISBN 978-0-87341-240-7.
- Gunnell, John, ed. (1987). The Standard Catalog of American Cars 1946-1975. Krause Publications. ISBN 978-0-87341-096-0.
- Gunnell, John, ed. (1993). The Standard Catalog of American Motors 1902–1987. Krause Publications. ISBN 978-0-87341-232-2.
- Mitchell, Larry (1994). AMC Buyers Guide. Motorbooks International. ISBN 978-0-87938-891-1.
