= Rambler Six and V8 =

Cars developed and produced by American Motors Corporation

Rambler Six and Rambler V8
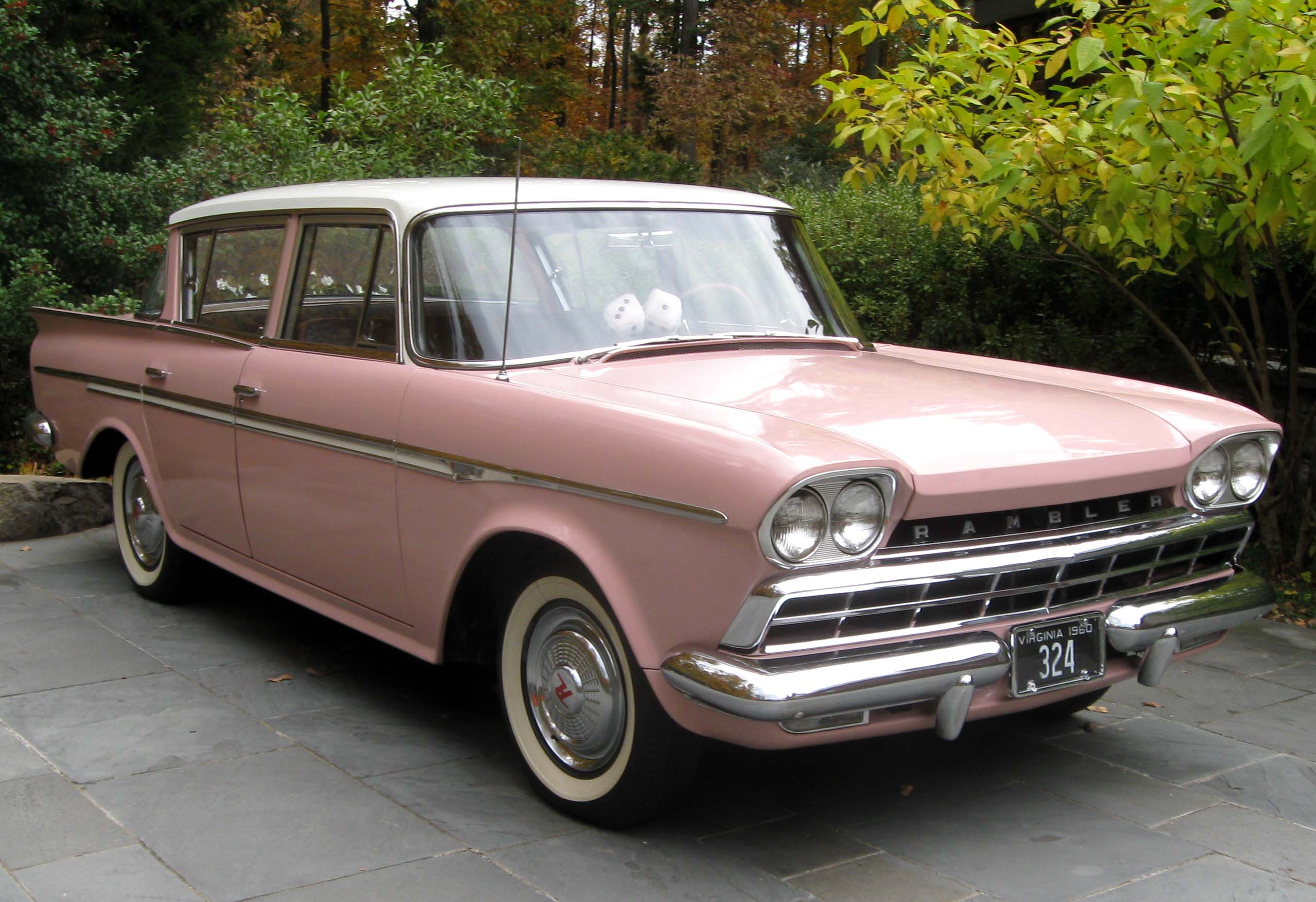
- 1960 Rambler Six sedan

Overview
- Manufacturer: American Motors Corporation (AMC)
- Also called: Nash Rambler; Hudson Rambler
- Production: 1956–1960
- Assembly: United States: Kenosha, Wisconsin; Belgium: Haren (Vilvoorde Renault Factory); Mexico: Mexico City and Monterrey
- Designer: Edmund E. Anderson

Body and chassis
- Body style: 4-door sedan; 4-door wagon; 4-door hardtop sedan; 4-door hardtop station wagon
- Layout: FR layout

Powertrain
- Engine: 195.6 cu in (3.2 L) Typhoon I6; 250 cu in (4.1 L) AMC 250 V8

Dimensions
- Wheelbase: 108 in (2,743 mm)

Chronology
- Successor: Rambler Classic

The Rambler Six and the Rambler V8 are intermediate sized automobiles that were built and marketed by American Motors Corporation (AMC) for model years 1956 through 1960.

Launched on 15 December 1955, the 1956 model year Rambler Six ushered a "new era in motoring has begun" according to George W. Romney, President of AMC. In 1956, the Rambler was sold through both Nash and Hudson networks of dealerships. This resulted from the merger of the two companies to form AMC in 1954.

The new Rambler line created and defined a new market segment, the "compact car" as the automobile classification was called at that time. A V8 engine powered model, the Rambler V8, was added for the 1957 model year.

== Background ==
The full-size cars made by Nash and Hudson were experiencing declining sales. The newly-organized American Motors focused its resources on introducing a line of smaller cars compared to those then available from the domestic Big Three (General Motors, Ford, and Chrysler) for the 1956 model year.

The designs were developed by AMC's styling director, Edmund E. Anderson, and they were aimed at a new market segment. Although conventional business thinking states that bigger profits were made from sales of bigger cars, American Motors lacked the resources to develop a full range of models targeting different market segments. As the chairman and president of AMC, George W. Romney also avoided a head-to-head battle with the U.S. automakers by focusing the company on the compact car. He "felt that with the Rambler I had the car of the future" and Romney "bet the farm on the Rambler" by spending US$5.4 million on a "crash program to bring the 1957 Rambler to market a year earlier."

The redesigned Rambler line for the 1956 model year was bigger, about 8 inches (203 millimetres) longer overall, but still positioned in the compact car classification of the time. The new for 1956 Rambler was arguably "the most important car American Motors ever built" in that it not only created and defined a new market segment, emphasized the virtues of compact design, but also enabled the automaker to prosper in the post-World War II marketplace that shifted from a seller's to a buyer's market.

The sales war between Ford and Chevrolet conducted during 1953 and 1954 had left little business for the much smaller "independent" automakers trying to compete against the standard models offered by the domestic Big Three (General Motors, Ford, and Chrysler). Imported vehicles from Europe (Volkswagen in 1955, Peugeot in 1958) and Asia (Toyota in 1957) were much smaller, but found buyers in North America.

== Model years ==
=== 1956 ===
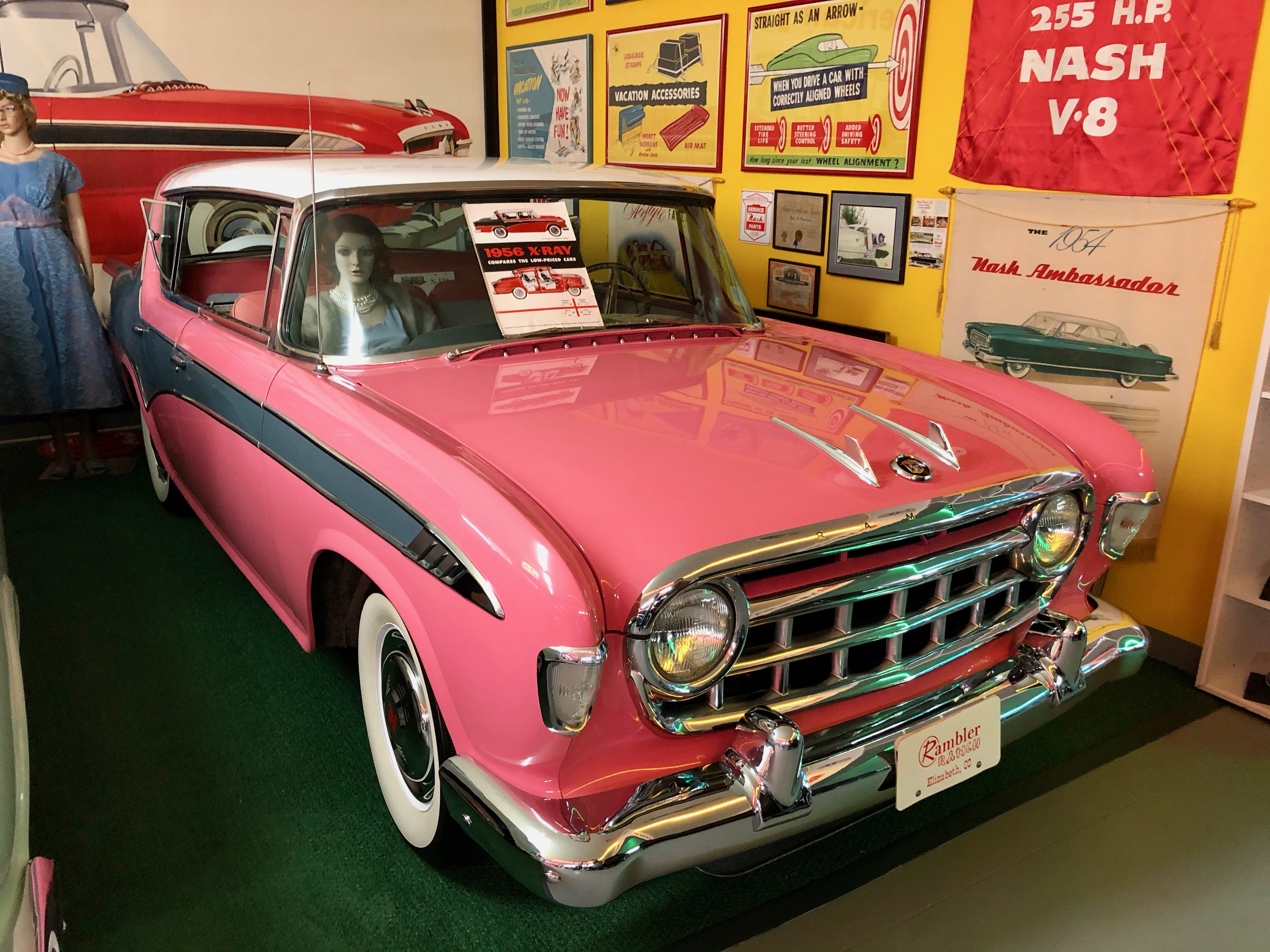
1956 Nash Rambler four-door hardtop

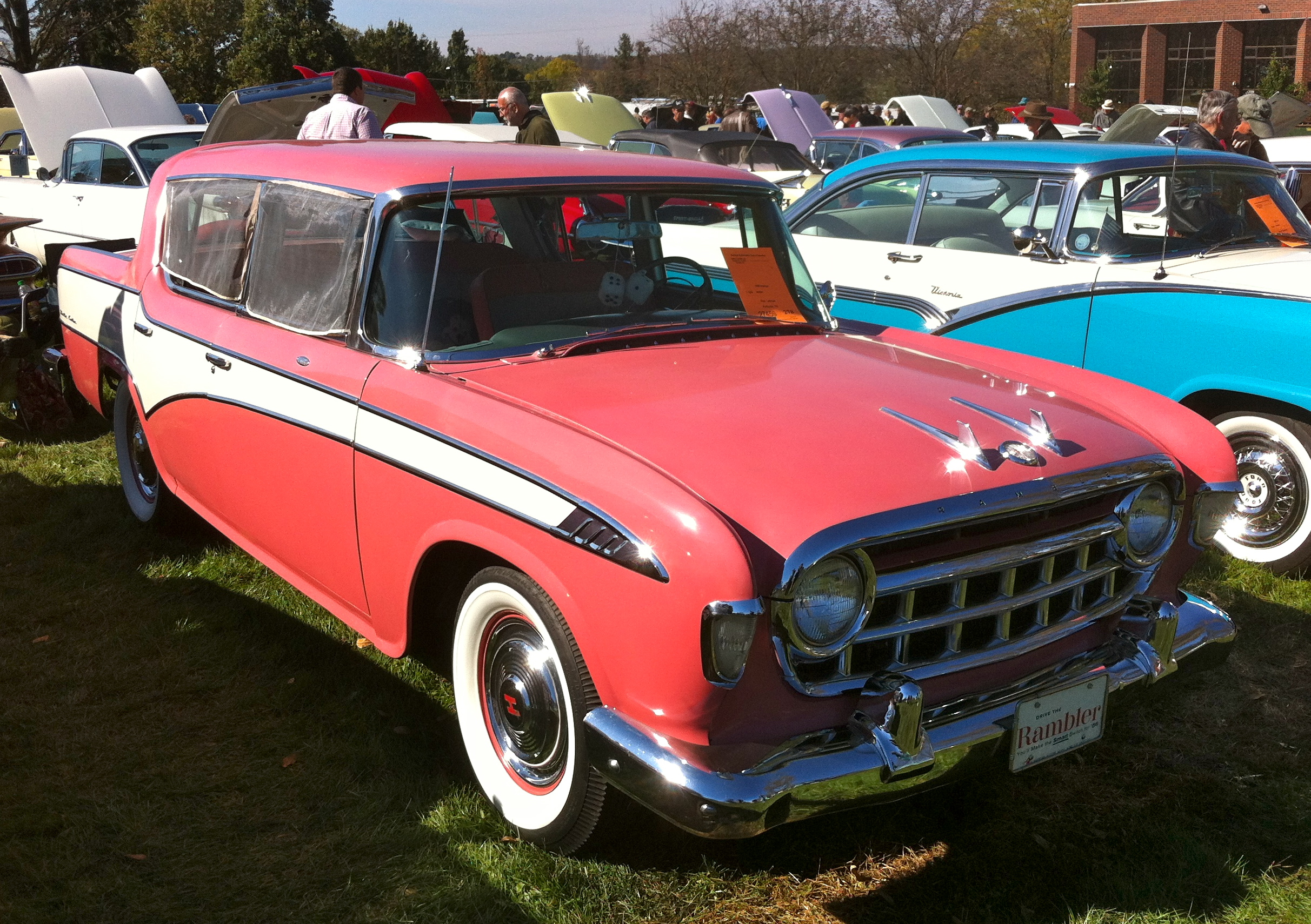
1956 Hudson Rambler Custom sedan, with dealer accessory window insect screens

The four-door Ramblers for the 1956 model year were completely redesigned, with a characteristic swept-back C-pillars (the Fashion Safety Arch), unusual wing windows on the rear doors, inboard, grille-mounted headlamps, as well as "the widest windshield" of any car. The short-wheelbase two-door (Nash Rambler) versions were no longer available. The new line retained the 108-inch (2,743 mm) wheelbase that was used for the previous four-door versions of the Nash Rambler, but the overall length was increased by 5 inches (127 mm), to 191.14 in (4,855 mm). The Rambler was substantially smaller outside compared to the other popular domestic cars of the era, but its interior room was equal to the top-selling "low-priced" field. Construction was also unusual, being unit body (what Nash called Double Safe Single Unit).

The 1956 Rambler models were marketed under both the Nash and Hudson brand names. The cars were almost identical except for minor badge engineering that included different logos on the hubcaps, grille insert, and hood emblem.

The new Ramblers came only as four-door models. Along with the usual four-door sedan and station wagon was a new four-door hardtop sedan. Rambler also introduced the industry's first four-door hardtop station wagon in 1956. The station wagons used the same rear doors as the sedans with the back roof dipped lower over the cargo area and featured a standard roof rack. The wagon models were called Cross Country. An innovation for station wagons was Rambler's roll-down tailgate window; competitors' models continued to use upward-hinged rear windows.

The new car was described as "distinct and different .... can be recognized at any angle from its wide-open competition-type grille to the pronounced arch over the rear window." According to automobile journalist Floyd Clymer, "economy and high-performance do not go hand in hand, but in the Rambler, the owner will find a happy medium ... though smaller, is safer than many cars. The welded, unitized body-frame construction offers above-average protection in collisions." The single-unit construction that was used by AMC on all of its models provided a marketing advantage by offering buyers a $25,000 personal automobile injury insurance policy at no extra cost.

The Typhoon straight-six for the new Rambler was based on the previous 195.6 cu in (3.2 L) block, but was improved and featured overhead valves and produced 120 bhp (89 kW; 122 PS). It was the only engine available in the 1956 Rambler because the automaker was still developing its own V8. This engine was said to deliver 33% more power than the 1955 version, and - at up to 30 miles per US gallon (7.8 L/100 km; 36 mpg_{‑imp}) - provided better fuel economy than the competition. The new Rambler also changed to a 12-volt electrical system. The automatic transmission was the GM-produced Hydramatic (called Flashaway by AMC). A torque tube drive system was used with a four-wheel coil spring suspension instead of the previous Hotchkiss drive setup.

The interiors were offered in fifteen colors and offered "genuine leather" (in six colors) as an option. The station wagons were popular with buyers, and in addition to power brakes (standard on Custom models), frequently ordered options included power steering, two- and three-tone exterior color schemes, a continental tire, Weather Eye heating and air conditioning system, as well as dealer accessory window insect screens to use with the individually adjustable and reclining front seats that could be used as a bed.

The new Rambler model became the replacement for the large-sized Nash and Hudson "legacy" models that were now suffering from dwindling sales. On the other hand, the Rambler was the only completely new "popular-priced" car in 1956. Consumer reaction to the 1956 Rambler was very positive. Advertising for the new car urged potential buyers to "Drive the Rambler - You'll Make the Smart Switch for 1956." Almost 74 percent of surveyed Rambler owners by Popular Mechanics described their cars as small and roomy, as well as easy to park and operate.

Sales for the inaugural year totaled 66,573. Of these, 20,496 were badged as Hudsons. Soon, the all-new "compact-sized" (as vehicles were defined at that time) models experienced a "sales explosion".

=== 1957 ===
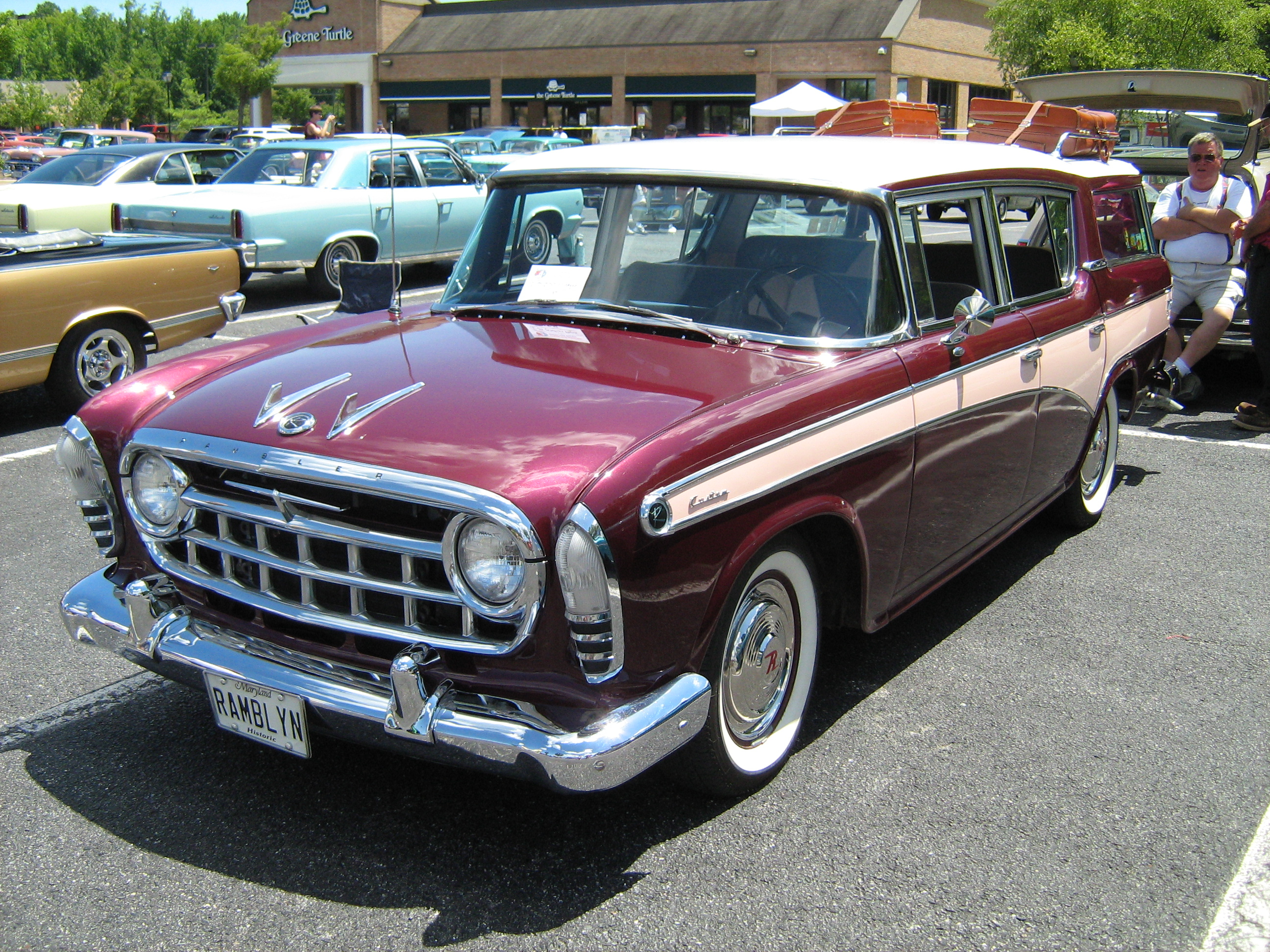
1957 Rambler Custom Cross Country

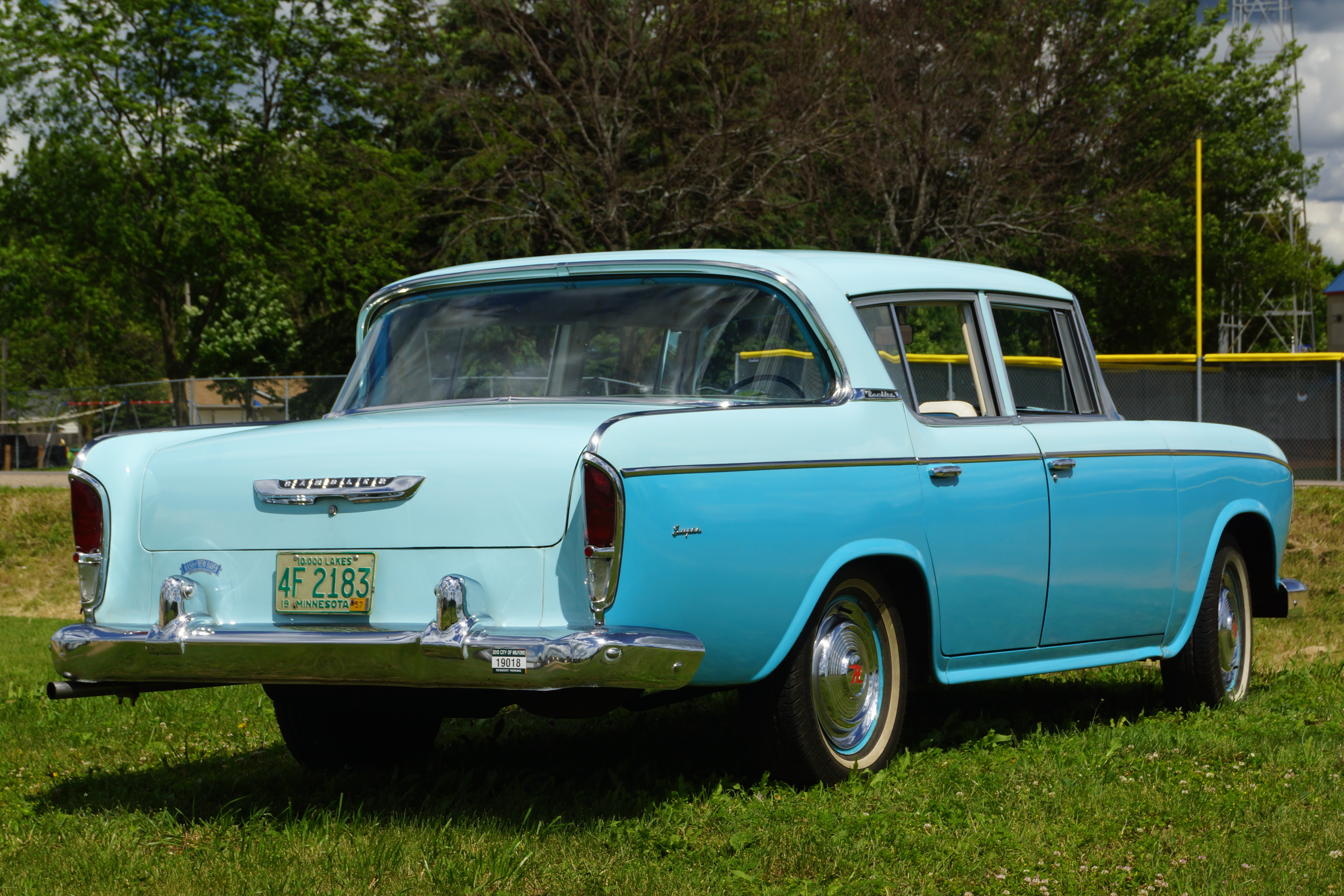
1957 Rambler Super sedan

In 1957, the Rambler was established as a separate marque and these models became the foundation for the new company's best sales performance through the late 1950s. Sales increased to 82,000.

The four-door sedans and station wagons were offered as well as a four-door hardtop body style with no "B" pillar. The most basic trim level, Deluxe, was essentially for fleet customers and only available with the six-cylinder engine. The Super and Custom trimmed models came with the I6 or AMC's new V8 engine. The Deluxe had no exterior side trim or series name, the Super came with a single full-length body side molding and a "Super" script emblem, and the Custom featured dual full-body side moldings with a "Custom" script emblem and a round "R" medallion on the top of the front fenders.

The new Rambler Cross Country was "typical of the stylish, yet highly practical wagons built by AMC in the 1950s" and was offered in solid colors or two- or three-tone paint schemes. Only a few station wagons "were available in 1957 with the very vogue hardtop configuration", and Rambler's Cross Country station wagon in Custom trim carried a relatively low price of $2,715. Options included seat belts, padded dash, and child proof door locks.

This was the first year the Rambler offered a new 250 cu in (4.1 L) V8 engine, producing 190 bhp (142 kW). A companion model in four-door hardtop style and featuring AMC's new high-performance 327 cu in (5.4 L) V8 was also introduced in 1957. This was the Rambler Rebel and it was an early "muscle car." With overdrive, the 1957 model was capable of up to 32 mpg_{‑US} (38 mpg_{‑imp}; 7.4 L/100 km).

The first American journalist to drive a U.S. automobile uncensored through the Soviet Union was Harry Walton in a brand new 1957 Rambler station wagon assembled in Belgium. The engine was detuned at the Brussels assembly plant to run on the higher 74 octane gasoline, available only in certain gas stations, and on one occasion, "to the Rambler's eternal credit it swallowed the [ordinary Soviet] stuff, protesting mildly." The heavily loaded station wagon cruised at 60 mph (97 km/h) and travelled 22.35 miles per US gallon (10.52 L/100 km; 26.84 mpg_{‑imp}). The journalist drove 3,500 miles (5,633 km) from the Polish border near Brest to the port city of Yalta, and Walton reported the Rambler station wagon "galvanized Russians into attention everywhere."

=== 1958 ===
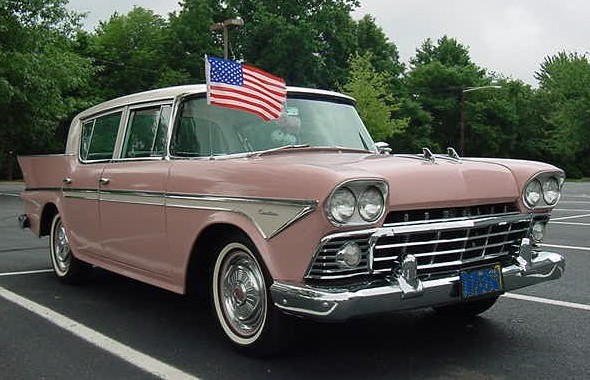
1958 Rambler Custom sedan

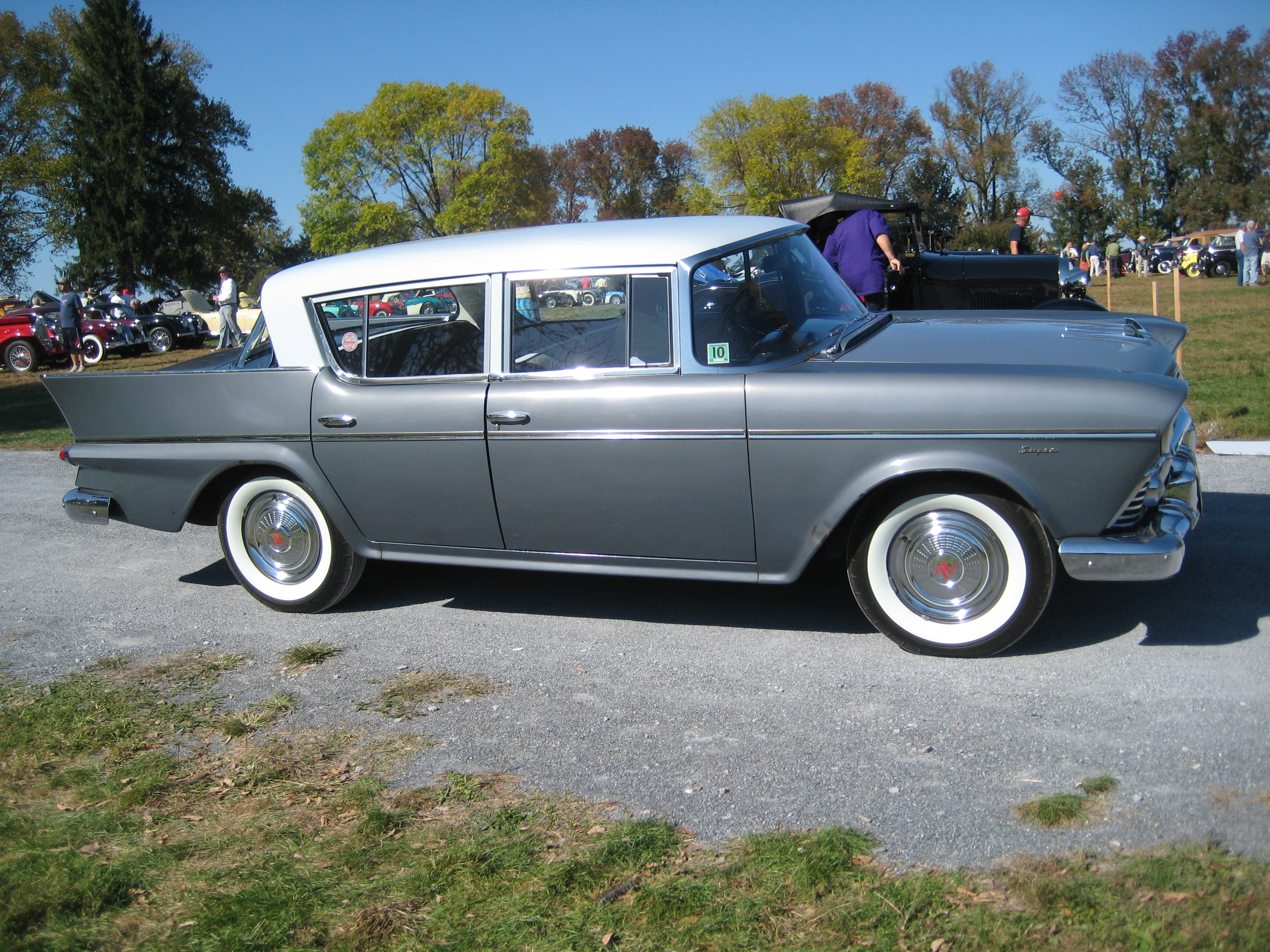
1958 Rambler Super sedan

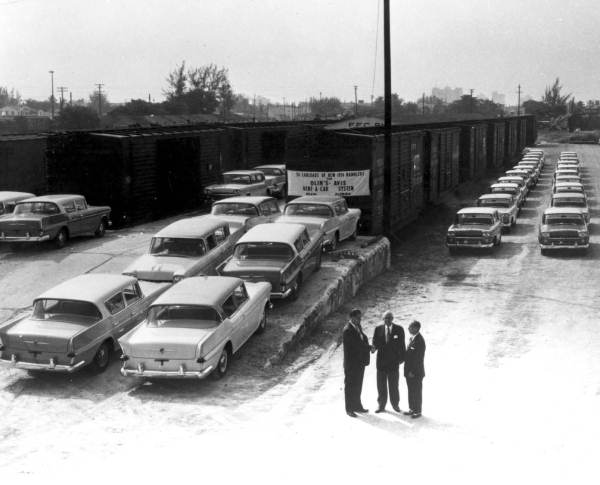
Fifty-six carloads of new 1958 Ramblers for Avis Rent a Car in Florida

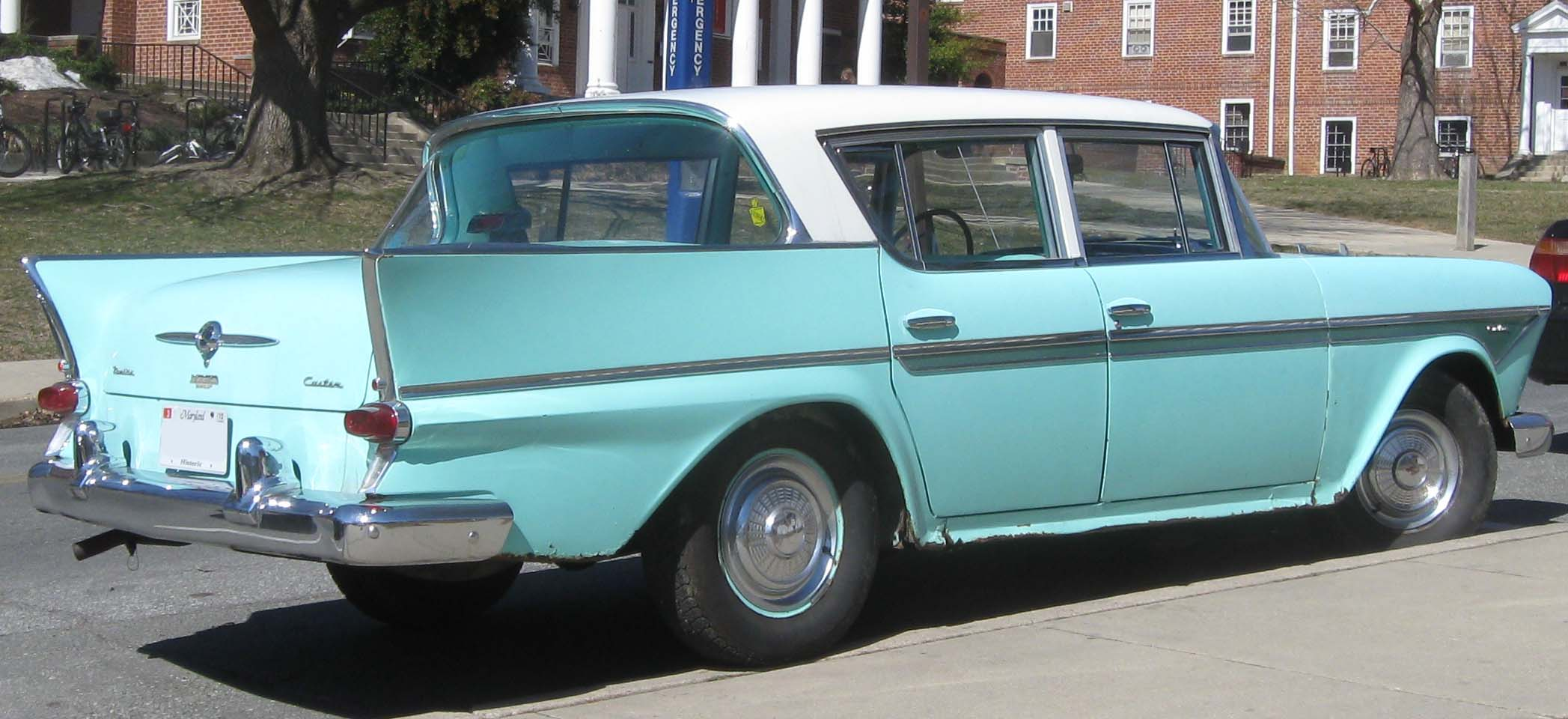
The 1958 Rambler Six's tailfinned rear

George W. Romney stated "the Hudson and Nash would remain distinctive in size from the Rambler in 1958." Designs were developed for the big-car Hudson and Nash models to share the Rambler automobile platform by stretching the body about nine inches ahead of the cowl. However, the Rambler became the new AMC division following the discontinuation of both the Nash and Hudson lines after the 1957 model year.

The larger-sized 1958 Ramblers incorporated "more than 100 changes and were outwardly quite different from their predecessors." The cars received "a complete reskin that made the 1956 bodies look a bit bulkier". This major redesign featured new front and rear fenders. A new front end moved the headlamps from inside the grille to the top of the front fenders and featured twin headlamps on each side on the "Super" and "Custom" models, as well as full-length bodyside moldings. The basic "Deluxe" trim models had no side trim and came standard with single headlights, but the new "quad" headlights were optional.

The 1958 Ramblers now had the industry's requisite flared tailfins. The Rambler line was one of the last among the domestic automobiles to incorporate tailfins to its body design (and also one of the first to eliminate them). When asked why the 1958 Ramblers featured this styling feature, George W. Romney, AMC's Chairman and CEO responded, "If we have to use tail fins to get people to try compact cars, we'll use tail fins. Later on, we will certainly be able to do away with them, and to build clean, simple, uncluttered cars."

By 1958, Rambler was selling half of its production as station wagons, proportionately more of that body style than any other automaker. All Rambler station wagons carried the Cross Country name. The innovative hardtop (no "B-pillar") station wagon body style was no longer available in the Rambler line, as it was reserved for the 1958 Ambassador models. The Rambler station wagons featured a step-down roof over their rear cargo area and a standard roof rack. The new design also featured wider rear openings with a frame-less roll-down rear window and a "one-finger" latch on the spring-assisted tailgate. Rambler's new one-piece, fold-down station wagon tailgate was adopted by all the U.S. automakers by 1961. A horizontal roller-type "window blind" was available to hide the lower half of the wagon's 80 cubic feet (2,265 L) cargo area. Motor Trend magazine conducted a comparison test of four 1958 station wagons (Rambler, Ford, DeSoto, and Oldsmobile) and found that the compact Rambler could hold as much cargo as the others.

The Rambler models continued to be the shortest cars marketed in the United States – at 191 inches (4,851 mm) in total length – with room for six passengers. Rambler's marketing focused on having "the best of both: 1. American big car room and comfort. 2. European small car economy and handling ease." Powering the Rambler Six was AMC's new 127 hp (95 kW; 129 PS) overhead valve (OHV) 195.6 cu in (3.2 L) straight-six. NASCAR tests showed the Rambler Six had a $0.01 per mile gasoline cost when equipped with overdrive transmission. A V8 engine was available in the performance-oriented Rambler Rebel models.

A Borg-Warner torque converter "Flash-O-Matic" automatic transmission, with the "then-trendy pushbutton" gear selection on the far left side of the instrument panel, was optional. Also new on the left side for the driver was a step-on parking brake pedal.

American Motors instituted a new paint system for the 1958 model year. All Ramblers received rust-inhibiting by submerging assembled bodies up to their roof into a large 40-foot (12 m) vat of primer (not sprayed on) before the color coat was applied, a revolutionary process that was later copied by other automakers. After drying, an additional wax-based compound was sprayed inside girders, rocker panels, fenders, and other hidden areas in the car bodies.

American Motors promoted the 1958 Rambler in several advertising campaigns. One approach featured George W. Romney challenging "the big car concept." A series of print ads also mocked the domestic Big Three automakers' standard-sized cars featuring illustrations by famous cartoonists showing the compact Rambler easily getting through places that would get the large "gas guzzling dinosaur" automobiles stuck. An example is the story, "The Millionaire and The Rambler" by Otto Soglow. Chon Day illustrated a story on how "Rambler foils bank robbery."

Sales of the Rambler six and V8 increased to 119,000 during a year when all U.S. cars were down in volume. The 1958 Ramblers "sold like hotcakes" and returned the smallest U.S. automaker to profitability. Together with the smaller Rambler American line, AMC "broke sales records" in 1958 as consumers valued basic transportation from their automobiles and no longer cared "how big their cars were." Although in the midst of the Recession of 1958, Rambler captured seventh place in automobile sales.

=== 1959 ===
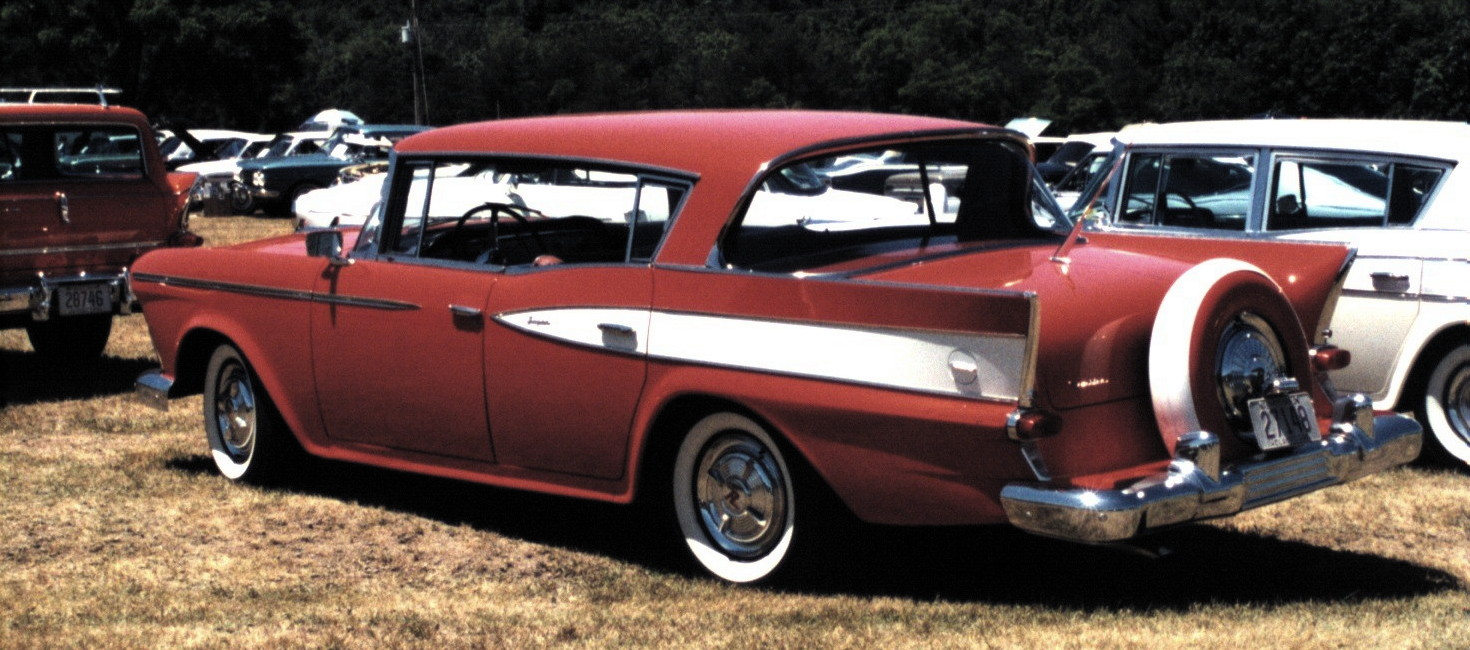
1959 Rambler Country Club hardtop with optional continental tire

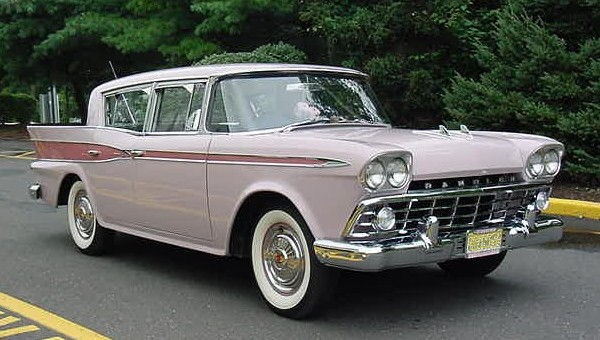
1959 Rambler Custom sedan

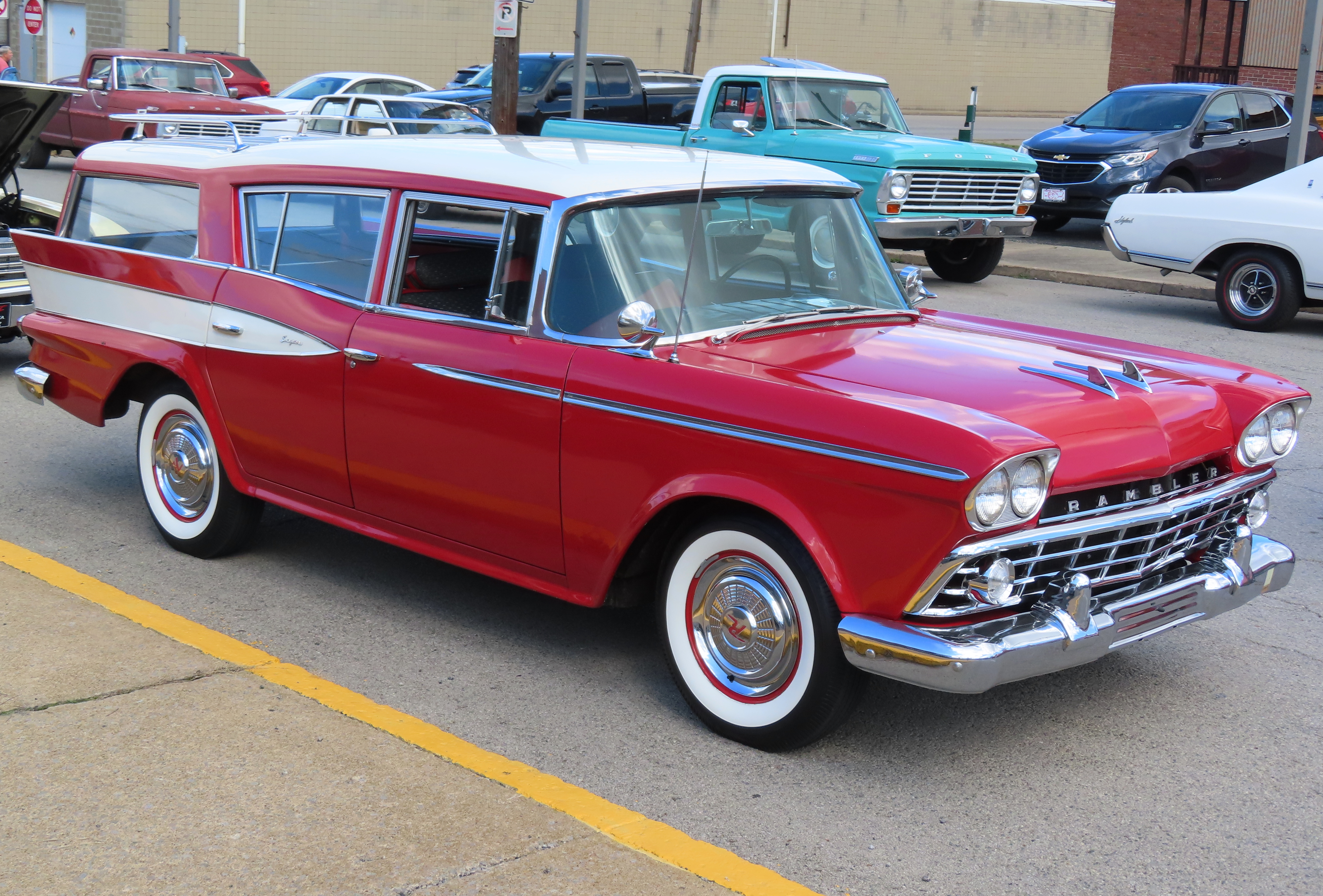
1959 Rambler Six Super Cross Country

Improvements to the Rambler included a full-width die-cast grille while the bodyside gained an uninterrupted line. Rather than blending into the C-pillar, the beltline continued to the tailfins. Engineering changes included thicker brake linings and larger brakes for V8-powered cars, as well as fuel economy improvements with lower axle ratios and more efficient carburetor for the I6 engines. An electrically engaged overdrive unit behind the three-speed manual transmission was also available. The automatic transmission was operated by pushbuttons on the left side of the instrument panel. The button functions were indicated by lights with amber for neutral and start, red for reverse, and green for the three drive gears. Engine starting was now incorporated into the neutral pushbutton, thus eliminating the ignition key start switch. Accidental starter engagement was prevented by a vacuum lockout when the engine was running. To increase longevity, Rambler mufflers were aluminum-coated on the inside and zinc-coated on the outside.

A total of eleven models were offered for 1959 in four-door sedan and station wagon versions as well as a four-door hardtop (no B-pillar) body style. The base "Deluxe" model came only as a six-cylinder 4-door sedan, the "Super" and "Custom" trims were available as "Economy 6" or "Rebel V-8" sedans or "Cross Country" station wagons, while the hardtop "Country Club" model came in Economy 6 Super or as a Rebel V-8 Custom. The Super models featured a contrasting color for the rear side trim while Custom models included a full-length secondary color-filled body side trim. Premium options and conveniences continued to be offered including "Weather Eye" air conditioning, air suspension on V8 equipped cars, limited-slip differentials, an exterior-mounted continental tire, as well as the American Motors' exclusive individually adjustable and reclining front seats with headrests that "would pay for themselves in safety if the car was banged from the rear."

A survey of 5,000 Popular Science magazine readers about all the new 1959 cars resulted in Rambler achieving the highest response to "Which car is the best deal for the money?" with its economy being cited as being most important for the owners. When asked "if you buy a '59, which one will you pick?" resulted in Ford being selected by 17% of the respondents while Rambler and Chevrolet tied for second place at 16%. The Ramblers "were well built, roomy, and economical, and found favor with thousands of American families. The unit body construction of the Ramblers was "found to be more superior to the others in terms of body tightness and freedom from rattles and twisting."

Sales of the bigger Ramblers did very well, especially given the automobile industry's modest recovery in 1959. Promotion by AMC focused on the car's compact size offering "big car room and comfort" along with "small car economy and handling." Ramblers attracted over a quarter-million customers, with the majority of them being sixes, as the Rebel V8 found just 16,399 buyers. The most popular body style was the "Cross Country" representing about half of the sales during 1959. These station wagons featured economy in fuel consumption and overall use as well as 80 cubic feet (2.27 m^{3}) of cargo space and room to fit 4-by-8-foot (1.22 m × 2.44 m) sheets of plywood. Rambler finished 1959 in sixth place among all models produced in the U.S. and AMC ended with $60 million in profits.

=== 1960 ===
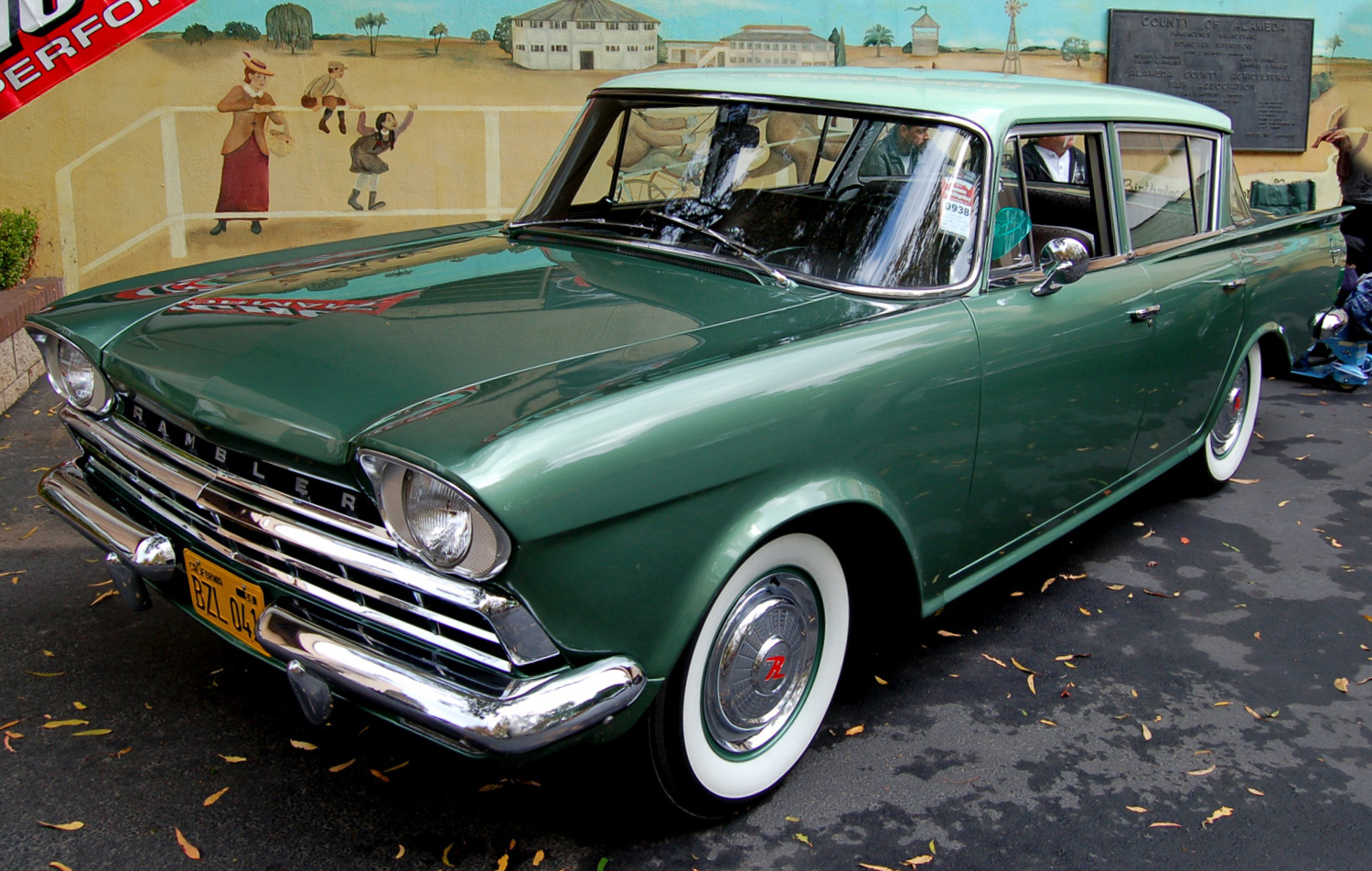
1960 Rambler Six Deluxe sedan, the lowest-priced equipment level

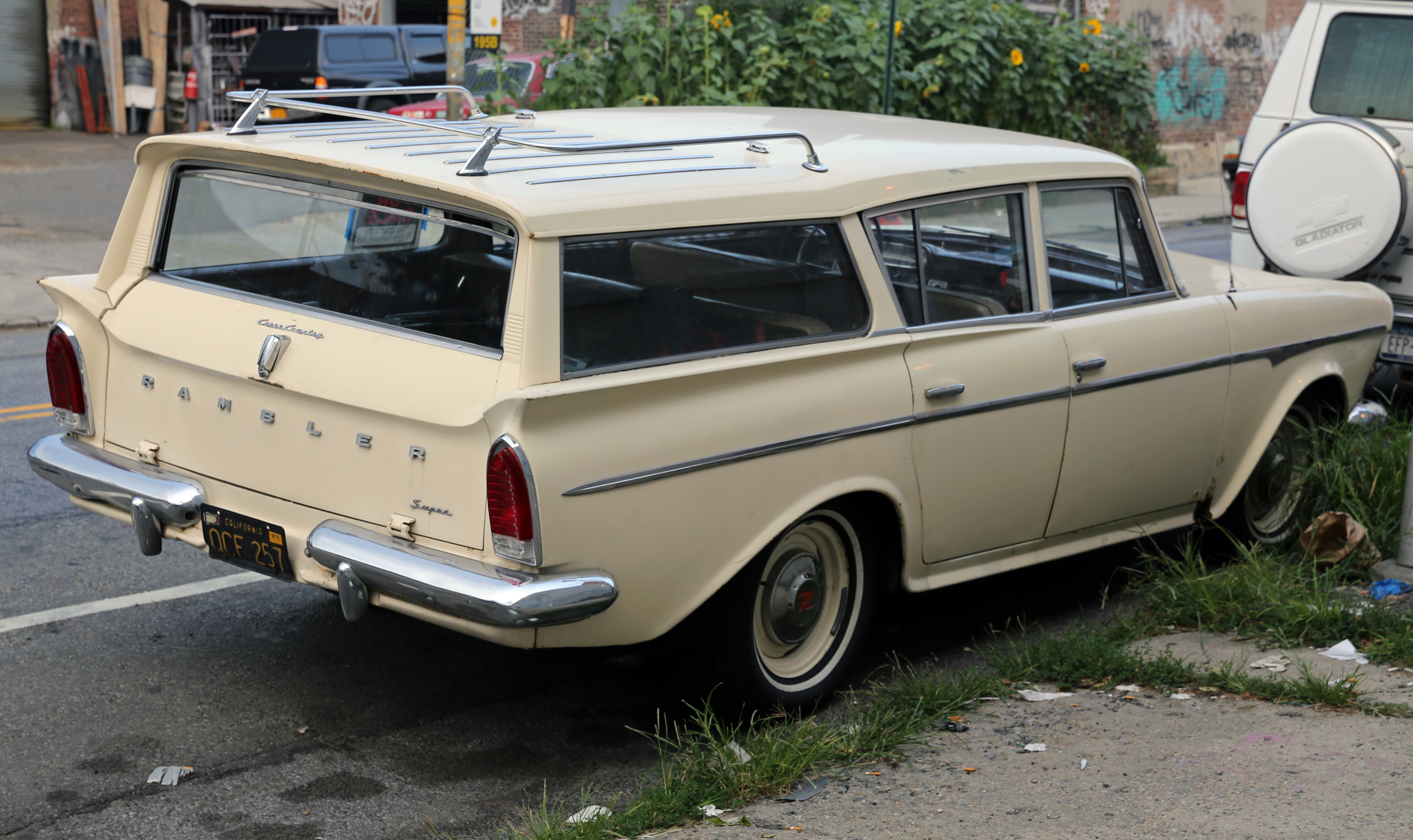
1960 Rambler Super Cross Country

The 1960 models featured numerous exterior and interior design changes. The greenhouse was made "lighter" with a narrower C-pillar and roof profile, as well as slanting both the windshield and rear window at a greater angle providing for an "airy cabin." The front end was simplified, while the tailfins became smaller thus highlighting the new tall taillamps. The overall length was trimmed by 1.6 inches (41 mm) because of a new spit-bumper design. Riding on 15-inch wheels the Rambler appeared to be larger than it actually was. The interior was also revised and the instrument panel now incorporated all instrumentation within a large oval in front of the driver.

The practice of separate Six and Rebel V8 models now ended with the focus on the Rambler name and the trim three levels: "Deluxe", "Super", and "Custom". Each was offered with "Economy 6 or Rebel V-8 engines."

The larger Rambler sedans were joined by a new four-door Rambler American model that rode on the shorter 100 in (2,540 mm) platform as the smaller two-door sedan and wagon series, but sales of all Ramblers continued to increase. In 1960, the Rambler line reached third place in total annual industry sales in the United States. The 1960 Rambler Six with its 127 hp (95 kW; 129 PS) 195.6 cu in (3.2 L) engine became the best selling model for AMC with 297,368 sold for the year.

== Overseas assembly ==
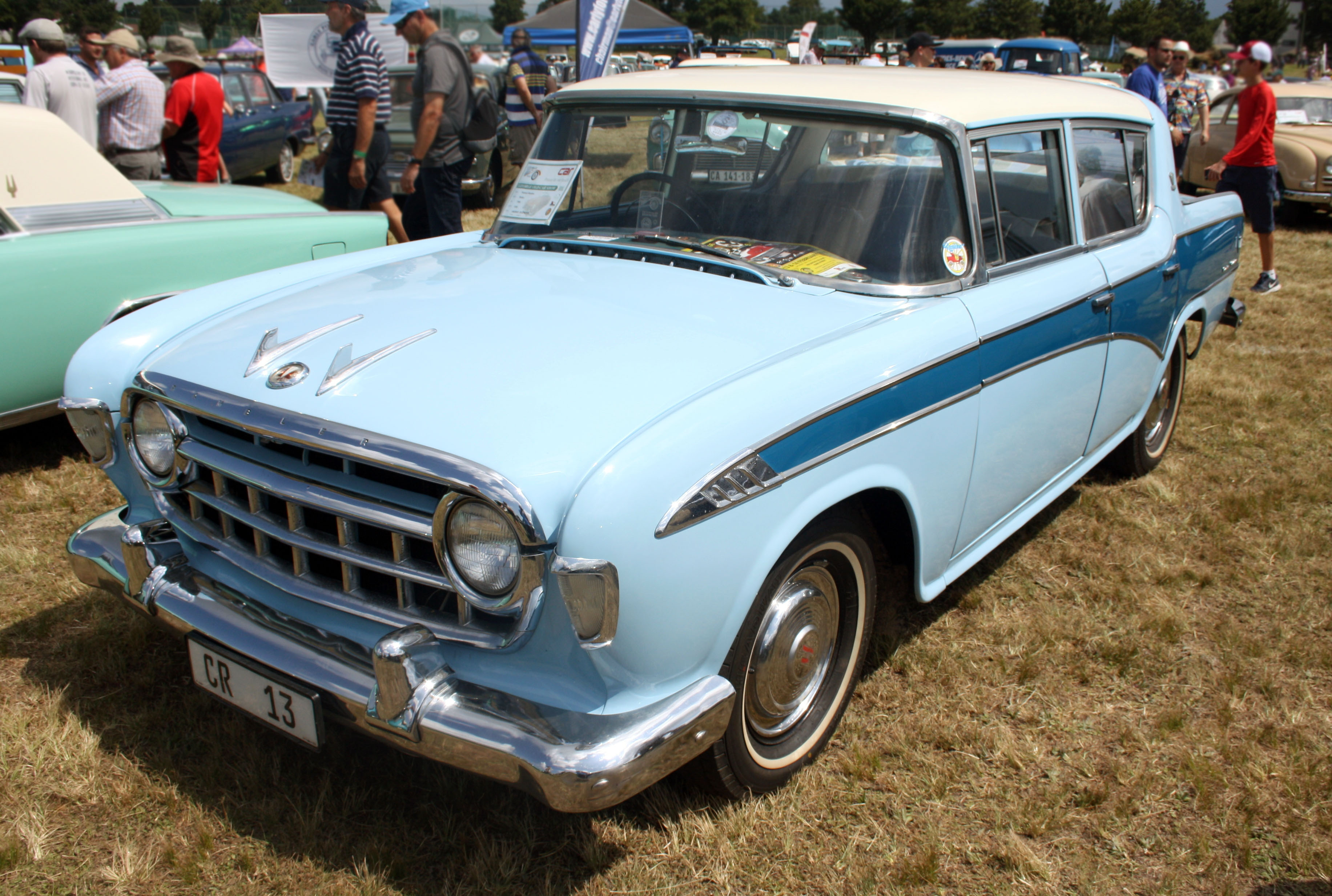
1956 Hudson Rambler with right-hand drive In South Africa

=== Canada ===
The former Nash plant on Danforth Avenue in Toronto produced the Rambler Six from 1955 until 1957. Production ended as subsequent models were imported from the United States.

=== Mexico ===
Midsize Rambler models were assembled from CKD kits in Mexico during two different periods. The first was under Armadora Mexicana based in Mexico City, between 1956 and 1957, and the second was under Planta REO based in Monterrey, from late 1959. Because of the low sales volume, American Motors terminated its contract with Armadora Mexicana that originally began with AMC's predecessor company in 1950. Complete Rambler models were again imported from the United States (between 1957 and 1958) and sold through a limited network of dealerships, most of which were located in Mexico City. The agreement with Planta REO was formalized in 1959, becoming AMC's second partner in the country and resuming local assembly.

Between 1958 and 1959, the Mexican midsize Rambler line consisted of a four-door sedan in Super trim, a four-door hardtop in Super trim, and a four-door pillared wagon in Cross Country trim. All three versions were powered by the one-barrel OHV 127 hp (95 kW; 129 PS) 195.6 cu in (3.2 L) I6 engines. A three-speed manual transmission was standard with the three-speed automatic as an option, including the push-button version.

The problem of low sales volume continued under Planta REO and AMC also canceled this contract. The company signed an agreement with Toyota in 1960. Planta REO did not focus on the Rambler brand in favor of the Japanese one, being allegedly an important or the main cause of the low commercial success of this second venture of AMC in Mexico. By March 1964, the relationship with Toyota was also terminated because the Mexican government increased the domestic content rate as well as the bankruptcy of Planta Reo.

Imports of completed AMC vehicles into Mexico resumed until a third domestic production partner was established. Willys Mexicana, the company that would become Vehículos Automotores Mexicanos (VAM) was the third local company that AMC would sign an agreement with during 1960. However, VAM did not assemble the Rambler Six and Rambler V8 models, focusing instead on the smaller-sized Rambler American cars. This marked the end of both the midsize Ramblers and subsequent first-generation Rambler Classics in the Mexican market. VAM never sought to import them instead either in 1960 and 1961 and the auto industry integration decree published in 1962 would legally ban the importation of fully assembled vehicles and engines. Willys Mexicana would not introduce a midsize AMC automobile until 1963, the cars being the second-generation Rambler Classic models.

The 1956 through 1959 Rambler models represented the only case of an AMC midsize station wagon being available in Mexico as the future second-generation Classic, Rebel, and Matador station wagons would not be produced in the country. It also represented the only case in Mexico in which AMC's intermediate line had more than two body styles available.

As of 2017, there is no record of the high-performance 1957 Rambler Rebel being available in Mexico, although there was the possibility of it being imported through individual orders.

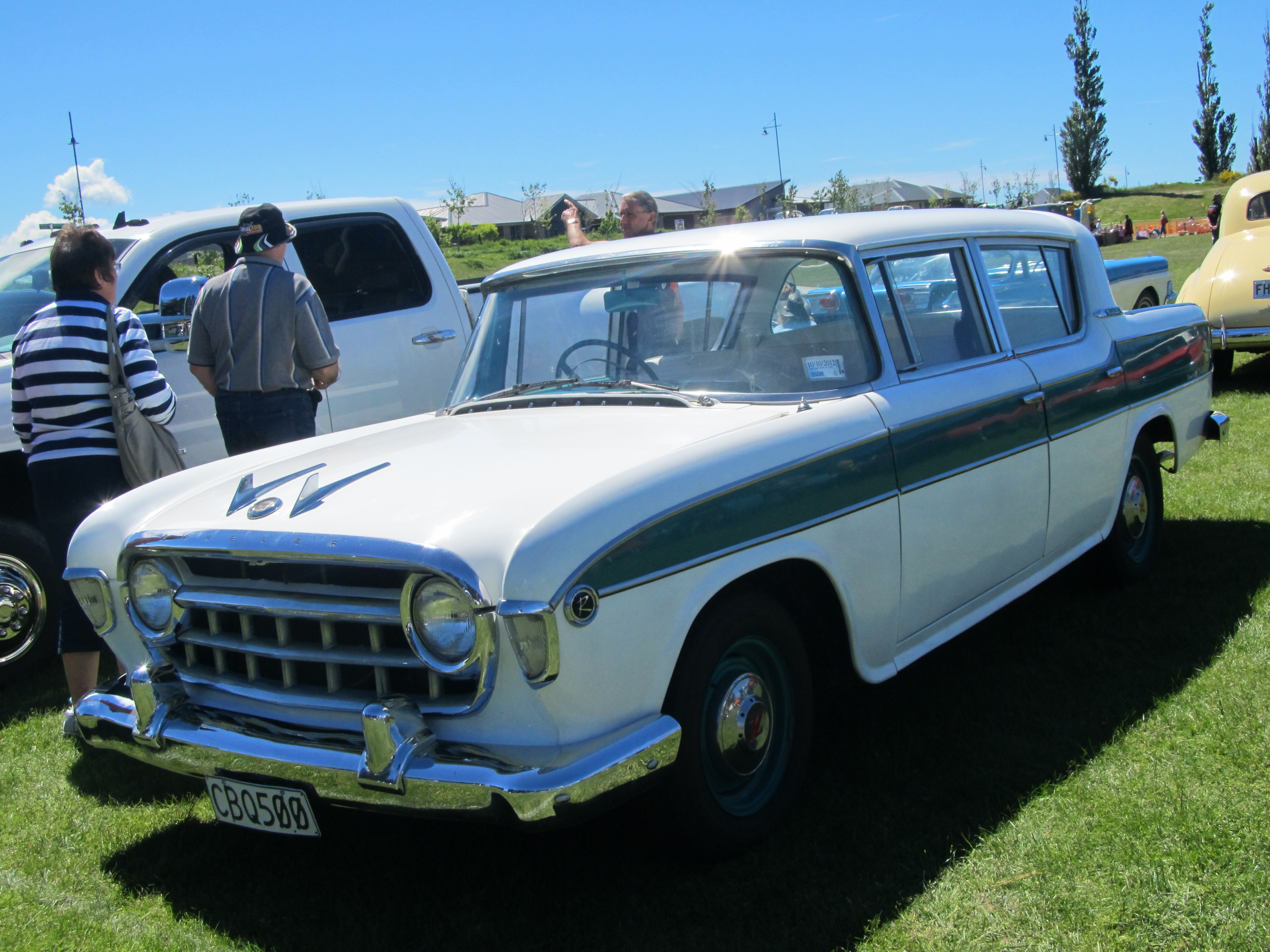
1956 Nash Rambler sedan with right-hand drive in New Zealand

=== Australia ===
Ramblers were assembled in Australia by Australian Motor Industries (AMI) starting in October 1960 under an agreement with AMC. They were assembled with right-hand drive from semi knock-down (SKD) kits shipped from U.S. factories. Many components such as upholstery, lights, and other parts were locally sourced to meet import tariff concessions.

=== New Zealand ===
The 1956-1960 Rambler models were assembled in New Zealand with a right-hand drive from semi-knock-down kits sourced from Canada. The cars were assembled by VW Motors in Otahuhu, Auckland where they were made alongside Volkswagen vehicles. Rambler production continued at the VW plant until 1962.

== Legacy ==
American Motors began the process of differentiating the Rambler brand name from its various sizes and similar model names. New nameplates were introduced; the Rambler Six and Rambler Rebel V8 were both renamed the Rambler Classic in 1961.
