= JECS =

Automotive parts manufacturer

JECS Corporation (formerly Japan Electrical Control Systems Co Ltd) is an automotive components company headquartered in Isesaki, Gunma, Japan and a wholly owned subsidiary of Hitachi. Its principal products are electronic control units, software, semiconductors, mechatronics, resin molding, inspection technology and material analysis.

JECS was formed in June 1973. It was a joint venture between Robert Bosch GmbH, Nissan Motor Co. and Diesel Kiki Co., Ltd.. It enabled Nissan to use Bosch's engine control technology, and gave Bosch access to the Japanese market. JECS later expanded to manufacture many other automotive parts besides EFI systems.

== History ==
- 1956 Unisia established.
- June 1973 JECS formed.
- 1993 JECS merges with Atsugi Unisia, becoming Unisia JECS Corp.
- November 1999 The French clutch company Valeo buys shares in Unisia JECS clutch division to gain entry to the Japanese market. This closely follows Renault's purchase of a controlling interest in Nissan, April of the same year.
- Mid 2001 Unisia JECS forms joint venture with Bosch Braking Systems Co. to produce power steering systems.
- October 2002 100% of Unisia JECS Corp. bought by Hitachi, delisted from stock market, renamed Hitachi Unisia Automotive, Ltd.. Previously, Nissan Motor, Hitachi and Robert Bosch owned 25%, 17% and 10% respectively.
- 2003 Unisia JECS opens factory in Shenzhen, China, to cut costs as demanded by Nissan.
- 2004 Hitachi Unisia Automotive Ltd. merged into Hitachi, Ltd.
- 2004 Unisia JECS opens factory in Guangzhou, China, to make water pumps and valves.

== Motorsport Sponsorship ==
Unisia JECS sponsored the Hasemi Motorsport team in JTCC and JGTC from 1991 until 2002. The Unisia JECS Skylines (GT500) and Silvias (GT300) also featured in video games & toys.

== Applications ==
16-bit ECUs from JECS were produced for the 1993+ Nissan 300ZX.

== Technology ==
=== Electronic Fuel Injection ===
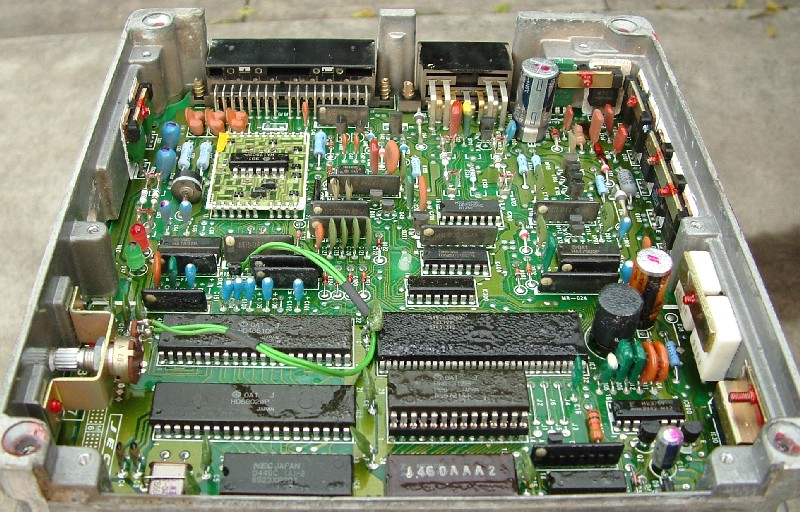
Mid 1980s JECS LH-Jetronic ECU. 40 pin IC bottom left is Hitachi Motorola 6800 clone, 28 pin IC (socketed) immediately right is 16kB ROM containing maps. JECS logo bottom left.

Bosch first produced the Jetronic EFI system in 1967. K-Jetronic & L-Jetronic followed from around 1973 which is when Nissan became involved.

==== L-Jetronic ====
Early JECS systems were L-Jetronic, with Bosch moving vane airflow meters. These systems used a mixture of German & Japanese parts. The electronics were Japanese, the sensors often German, the fuel pumps/regulators made under license to Bosch by DENSO.

==== LH-Jetronic ====
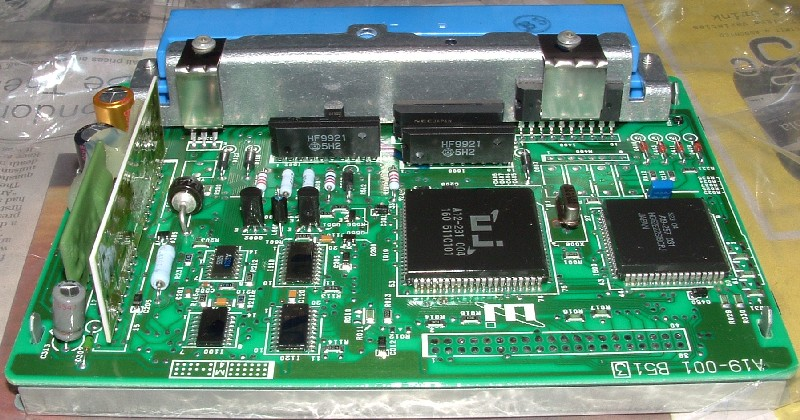
Late 1990s JECS LH-Jetronic ECU. Much smaller, more integration, all custom ICs, maps no longer easily accessible. 2Unisia JECS logo bottom right and on main IC.

By the mid-1980s, JECS were using LH-Jetronic, and the new Bosch hotwire mass airflow meter. The early JECS LH-Jetronic systems were based on a Motorola 6800 architecture, using many Hitachi components. The earliest hotwire meters were still from Germany, but by the end of the 1980s all of the system components (pumps, sensors, injectors, ECU) were being made in Japan.
