= Manifold injection =

External mixture preparation system for internal combustion engines

Manifold injection is a mixture formation system for internal combustion engines with external mixture formation. It is commonly used in engines with spark ignition that use petrol as fuel, such as the Otto engine, and the Wankel engine. In a manifold-injected engine, the fuel is injected into the intake manifold, where it begins forming a combustible air-fuel mixture with the air. As soon as the intake valve opens, the piston starts sucking in the still forming mixture. Usually, this mixture is relatively homogeneous, and, at least in production engines for passenger cars, approximately stoichiometric; this means that there is an even distribution of fuel and air across the combustion chamber, and enough, but not more air present than what is required for the fuel's complete combustion. The injection timing and measuring of the fuel amount can be controlled either mechanically (by a fuel distributor), or electronically (by an engine control unit). Since the 1970s and 1980s, manifold injection has been replacing carburettors in passenger cars. However, since the late 1990s, car manufacturers have started using petrol direct injection, which caused a decline in manifold injection installation in newly produced cars.

There are two different types of manifold injection:

- the multi-point injection (MPI) system, also known as port injection, or dry manifold system
- and the single-point injection (SPI) system, also known as throttle-body injection (TBI), central fuel injection (CFI), electronic gasoline injection (EGI), and wet manifold system

In this article, the terms multi-point injection (MPI), and single-point injection (SPI) are used. In an MPI system, there is one fuel injector per cylinder, installed very close to the intake valve(s). In an SPI system, there is only a single fuel injector, usually installed right behind the throttle valve. Modern manifold injection systems are usually MPI systems; SPI systems are now considered obsolete.

== Description ==
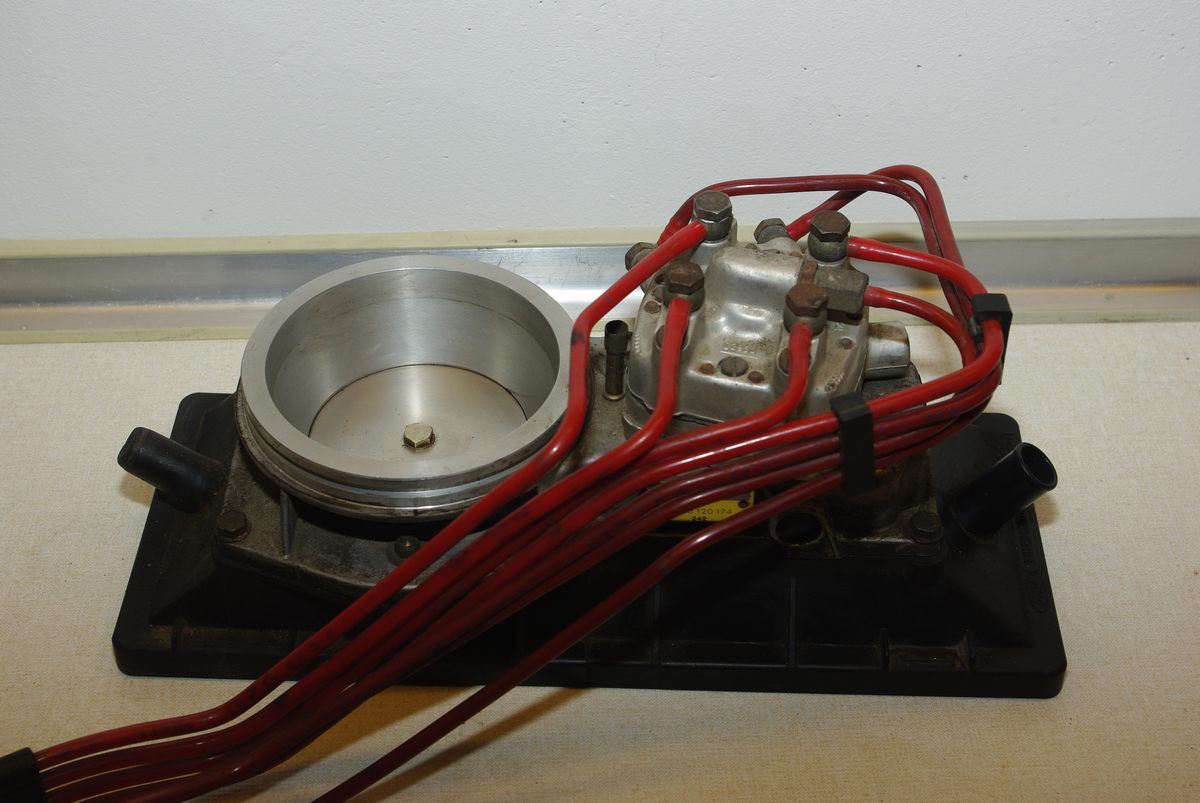
Continuously injecting mechanical MPI system Bosch K-Jetronic (ca. 1980s) The part on the right with red fuel lines coming out of it is the fuel distributor; the part on the left is a vacuum-driven piston used for determining the amount of air currently sucked into the engine

In a manifold injected engine, the fuel is injected with relatively low pressure (70...1470 kPa) into the intake manifold to form a fine fuel vapour. This vapour can then form a combustible mixture with the air, and the mixture is sucked into the cylinder by the piston during the intake stroke. Otto engines use a technique called quantity control for setting the desired engine torque, which means that the amount of mixture sucked into the engine determines the amount of torque produced. For controlling the amount of mixture, a throttle valve is used, which is why quantity control is also called intake air throttling. Intake air throttling changes the amount of air sucked into the engine, which means that if a stoichiometric ($\lambda \approx 1$) air-fuel mixture is desired, the amount of injected fuel has to be changed along with the intake air throttling. To do so, manifold injection systems have at least one way to measure the amount of air that is currently being sucked into the engine. In mechanically controlled systems with a fuel distributor, a vacuum-driven piston directly connected to the control rack is used, whereas electronically controlled manifold injection systems typically use an airflow sensor, and a lambda sensor. Only electronically controlled systems can form the stoichiometric air-fuel mixture precisely enough for a three-way catalyst to work sufficiently, which is why mechanically controlled manifold injection systems such as the Bosch K-Jetronic are now considered obsolete.

=== Main types ===
==== Single-point injection ====
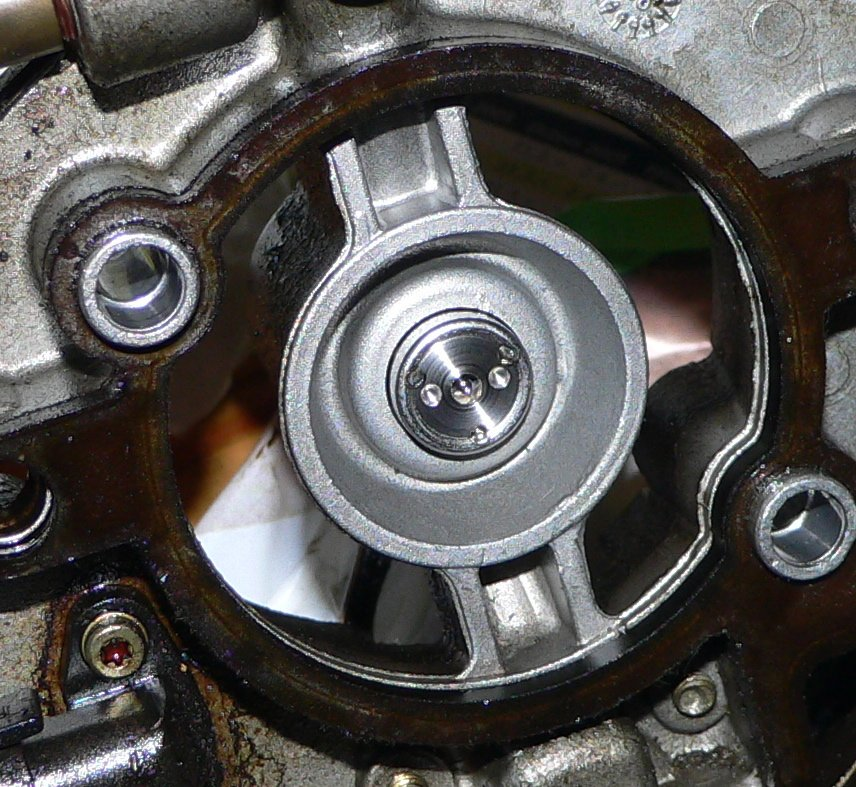
Single-point injection fuel injector of a Bosch Mono-Jetronic (ca. 1990s)

As the name implies, a single-point injected (SPI) engine only has a single fuel injector. It is usually installed right behind the throttle valve in the throttle body. Single-point injection was a relatively low-cost way for automakers to reduce exhaust emissions to comply with tightening regulations while providing better "driveability" (easy starting, smooth running, freedom from hesitation) than could be obtained with a carburetor. Many of the carburetor's supporting components - such as the air cleaner, intake manifold, and fuel line routing - could be used with few or no changes. This postponed the redesign and tooling costs of these components. However, single-point injection does not allow forming very precise mixtures required for modern emission regulations, and is thus deemed an obsolete technology in passenger cars. Single-point injection was used extensively on American-made passenger cars and light trucks during 1980–1995, and in some European cars in the early and mid-1990s.

Single-point injection has been a known technology since the 1960s, but has long been considered inferior to carburettors, because it requires an injection pump, and is thus more complicated. Only with the availability of inexpensive digital engine control units (ECU) in the 1980s did single-point injection become a reasonable option for passenger cars. Usually, intermittently injecting, low injection pressure (70...100 kPa) systems were used that allowed the use of low-cost electric fuel injection pumps. A very common single-point injection system used in many passenger cars is the Bosch Mono-Jetronic, which German motor journalist Olaf von Fersen considers a "combination of fuel injection and carburettor".

The system was called Throttle-body Injection or Digital Fuel Injection by General Motors, Central Fuel Injection by Ford, PGM-CARB by Honda, and EGI by Mazda).

==== Multi-point injection ====
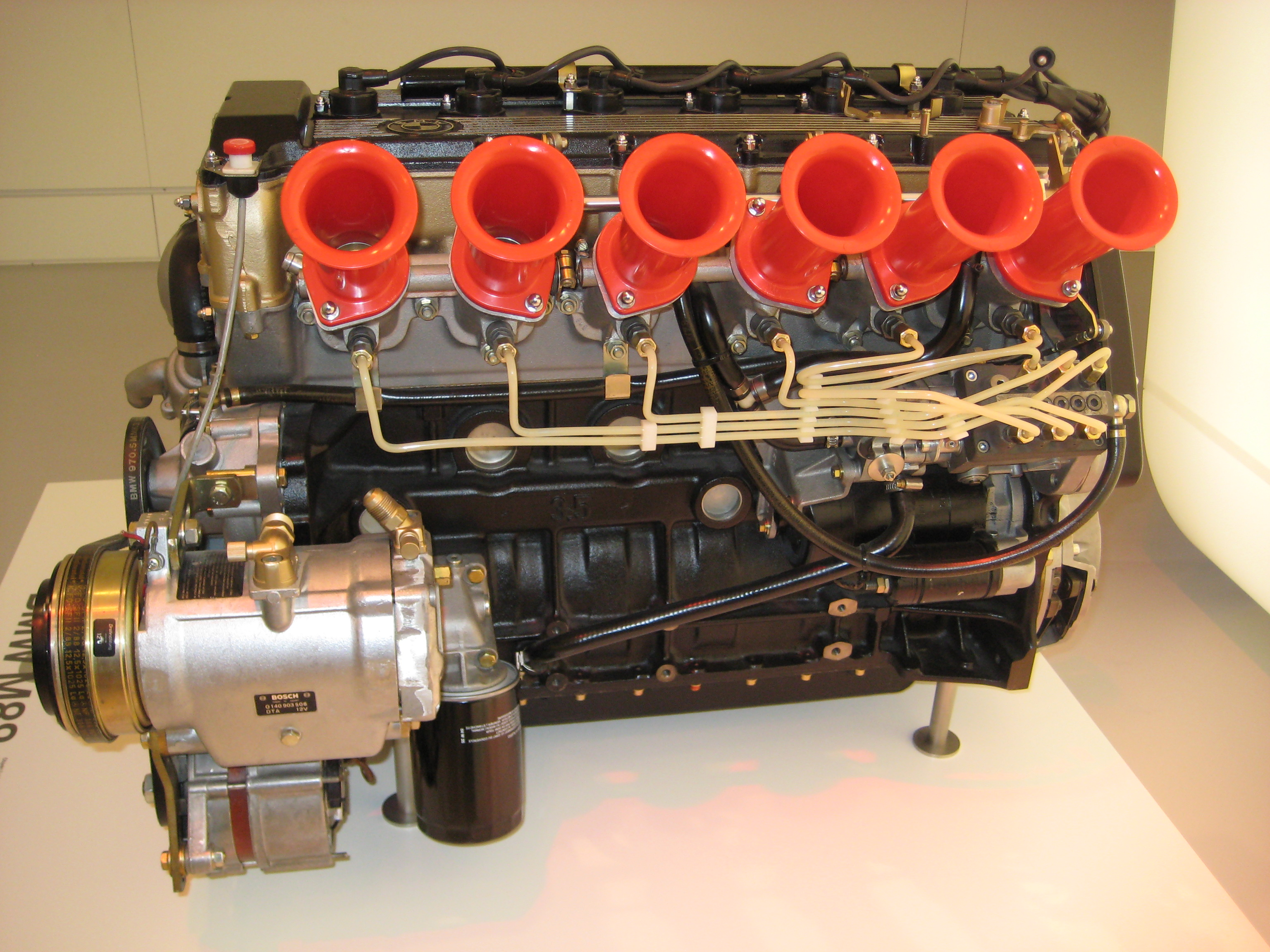
Straight-six engine BMW M88 This example shows the basic layout of a multi-point injected engine – each cylinder is fitted with its own fuel injector, and each fuel injector has its own fuel line (white parts) going straight into the fuel injection pump (mounted on the right hand side)

In a multi-point injected engine, every cylinder has its own fuel injector, and the fuel injectors are usually installed in close proximity to the intake valve(s). Thus, the injectors inject the fuel through the open intake valve into the cylinder, which should not be confused with direct injection. Certain multi-point injection systems also use tubes with poppet valves fed by a central injector instead of individual injectors. Typically though, a multi-point injected engine has one fuel injector per cylinder, an electric fuel pump, a fuel distributor, an airflow sensor, and, in modern engines, an engine control unit. The temperatures near the intake valve(s) are rather high, the intake stroke causes intake air swirl, and there is much time for the air-fuel mixture to form. Therefore, the fuel does not require much atomisation. The atomisation quality is relative to the injection pressure, which means that a relatively low injection pressure (compared with direct injection) is sufficient for multi-point injected engines. A low injection pressure results in a low relative air-fuel velocity, which causes large, and slowly vapourising fuel droplets. Therefore, the injection timing has to be precise to minimise unburnt fuel (and thus HC emissions). Because of this, continuously injecting systems such as the Bosch K-Jetronic are obsolete. Modern multi-point injection systems use electronically controlled intermittent injection instead.

From 1992 to 1996 General Motors implemented a system called Central Port Injection or Central Port Fuel Injection. The system uses tubes with poppet valves from a central injector to spray fuel at each intake port rather than the central throttle body. Fuel pressure is similar to a single-point injection system. CPFI (used from 1992 to 1995) is a batch-fire system, while CSFI (from 1996) is a sequential system.

=== Injection controlling mechanism ===
In manifold injected engines, there are three main methods of metering the fuel, and controlling the injection timing.

==== Mechanically controlled ====
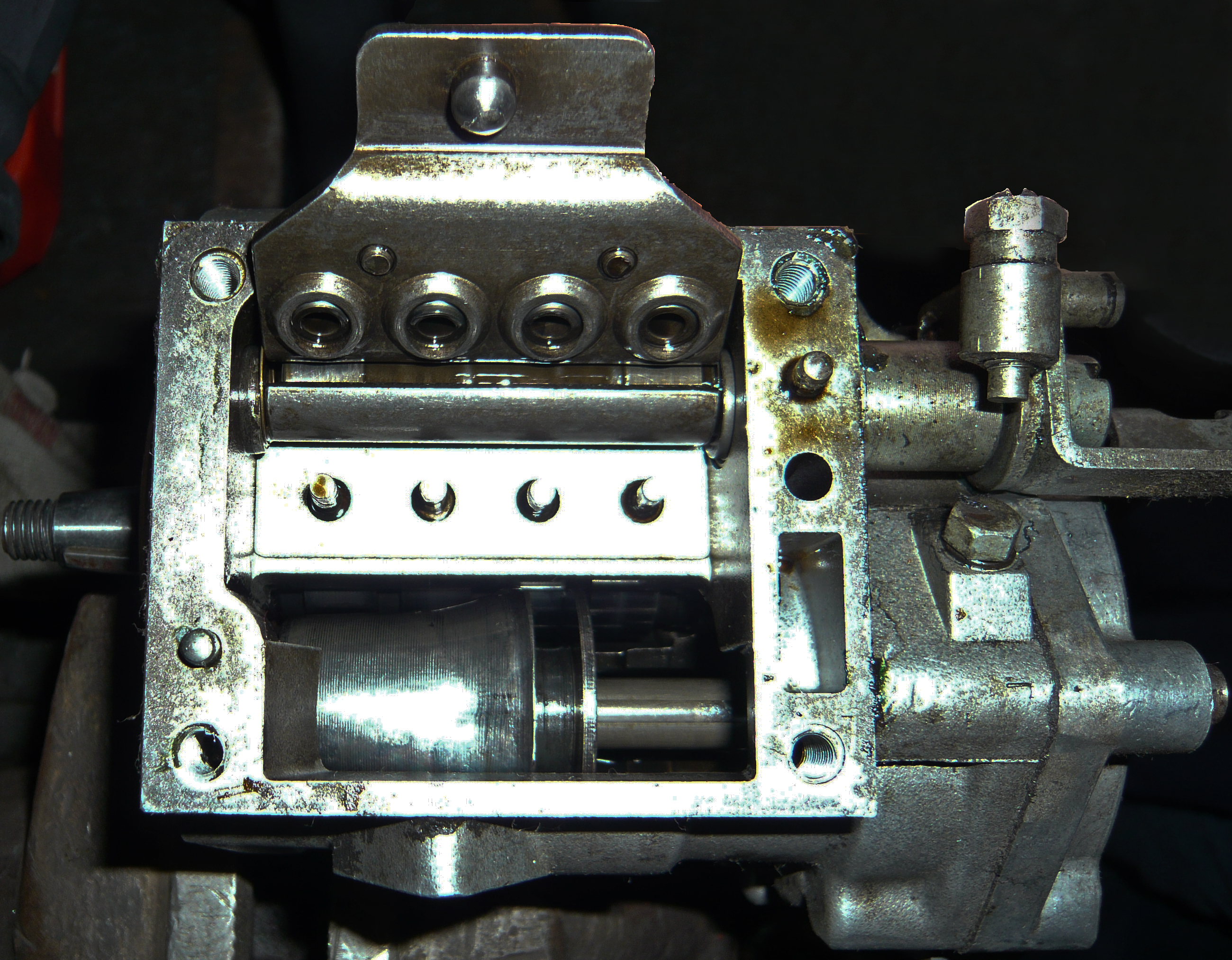
Mechanic fuel injection pump system "Kugelfischer" This system uses a three-dimensional cam

In early manifold injected engines with fully mechanical injection systems, a gear-, chain- or belt-driven injection pump with a mechanic "analogue" engine map was used. This allowed injecting fuel intermittently, and relatively precisely. Typically, such injection pumps have a three-dimensional cam that depicts the engine map. Depending on the throttle position, the three-dimensional cam is moved axially on its shaft. A roller-type pick-up mechanism that is directly connected to the injection pump control rack rides on the three-dimensional cam. Depending upon the three-dimensional cam's position, it pushes in or out the camshaft-actuated injection pump plungers, which controls both the amount of injected fuel, and the injection timing. The injection plungers both create the injection pressure, and act as the fuel distributors. Usually, there is an additional adjustment rod that is connected to a barometric cell, and a cooling water thermometer, so that the fuel mass can be corrected according to air pressure, and water temperature. Kugelfischer injection systems also have a mechanical centrifugal crankshaft speed sensor. Multi-point injected systems with mechanical controlling were used until the 1970s.

==== Not injection-timing controlled ====
In systems without injection-timing controlling, the fuel is injected continuously, thus, no injection timing is required. The biggest disadvantage of such systems is that the fuel is also injected when the intake valves are closed, but such systems are much simpler and less expensive than mechanical injection systems with engine maps on three-dimensional cams. Only the amount of injected fuel has to be determined, which can be done very easily with a rather simple fuel distributor that is controlled by an intake manifold vacuum-driven airflow sensor. The fuel distributor does not have to create any injection pressure, because the fuel pump already provides pressure sufficient for injection (up to 500 kPa). Therefore, such systems are called unpowered, and do not need to be driven by a chain or belt, unlike systems with mechanical injection pumps. Also, an engine control unit is not required. Unpowered multi-point injection systems without injection-timing controlling such as the Bosch K-Jetronic were commonly used from the mid-1970s until the early 1990s in passenger cars, although examples had existed earlier, such as the Rochester Ramjet offered on high-performance versions of the Chevrolet small-block engine from 1957 to 1965.

==== Electronic control unit ====
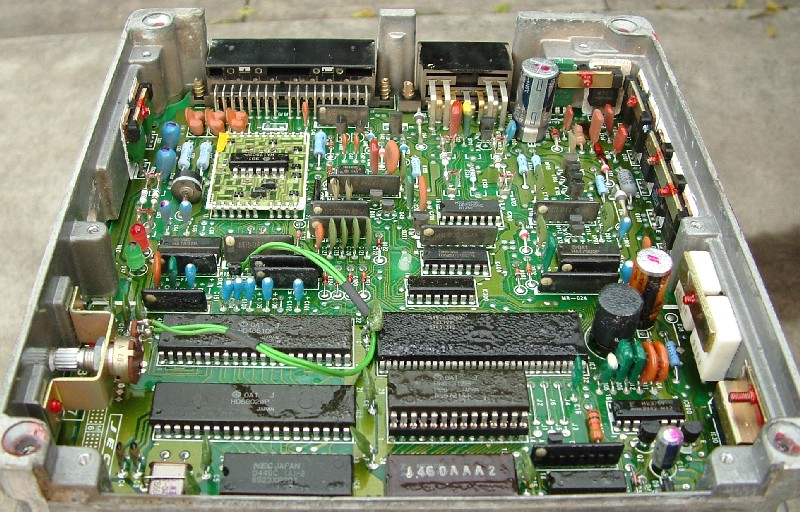
Bosch LH-Jetronic An electronic engine control unit has an engine map stored in its ROM and uses it as well as sensor data to determine how much fuel has to be injected, and when the fuel has to be injected

Engines with manifold injection, and an electronic engine control unit are often referred to as engines with electronic fuel injection (EFI). Typically, EFI engines have an engine map built into discrete electronic components, such as read-only memory. This is both more reliable and more precise than a three-dimensional cam. The engine control circuitry uses the engine map, as well as airflow, throttle valve, crankshaft speed, and intake air temperature sensor data to determine both the amount of injected fuel, and the injection timing. Usually, such systems have a single, pressurised fuel rail, and injection valves that open according to an electric signal sent from the engine control circuitry. The circuitry can either be fully analogue, or digital. Analogue systems such as the Bendix Electrojector were niche systems, and used from the late 1950s until the early 1970s; digital circuitry became available in the late 1970s, and has been used in electronic engine control systems since. One of the first widespread digital engine control units was the Bosch Motronic.

=== Air mass determination ===
In order to mix air and fuel correctly so a proper air-fuel mixture is formed, the injection control system needs to know how much air is sucked into the engine, so it can determine how much fuel has to be injected accordingly. In modern systems, an air-mass meter that is built into the throttle body meters the air mass, and sends a signal to the engine control unit, so it can calculate the correct fuel mass. Alternatively, a manifold vacuum sensor can be used. The manifold vacuum sensor signal, the throttle position, and the crankshaft speed can then be used by the engine control unit to calculate the correct amount of fuel. In modern engines, a combination of all these systems is used. Mechanical injection controlling systems as well as unpowered systems typically only have an intake manifold vacuum sensor (a membrane or a sensor plate) that is mechanically connected to the injection pump rack or fuel distributor.

=== Injection operation modes ===
Manifold injected engines can use either continuous or intermittent injection. In a continuously injecting system, the fuel is injected continuously, thus, there are no operating modes. In intermittently injecting systems however, there are usually four different operating modes.

==== Simultaneous injection ====
In a simultaneously intermittently injecting system, there is one single, fixed injection timing for all cylinders. Therefore, the injection timing is ideal only for some cylinders; there is always at least one cylinder that has its fuel injected against the closed intake valve(s). This causes fuel evaporation times that are different for each cylinder.

==== Group injection ====
Systems with intermittent group injection work similarly to the simultaneously injection systems mentioned earlier, except that they have two or more groups of simultaneously injecting fuel injectors. Typically, a group consists of two fuel injectors. In an engine with two groups of fuel injectors, there is an injection every half crankshaft rotation, so that at least in some areas of the engine map no fuel is injected against a closed intake valve. This is an improvement over a simultaneously injecting system. However, the fuel evaporation times are still different for each cylinder.

==== Sequential injection ====
In a sequentially injecting system, each fuel injector has a fixed, correctly set, injection timing that is in sync with the spark plug firing order, and the intake valve opening. This way, no more fuel is injected against closed intake valves.

==== Cylinder-specific injection ====
Cylinder-specific injection means that there are no limitations to the injection timing. The injection control system can set the injection timing for each cylinder individually, and there is no fixed synchronisation between each cylinder's injector. This allows the injection control unit to inject the fuel not only according to firing order, and intake valve opening intervals, but it also allows it to correct cylinder charge irregularities. This system's disadvantage is that it requires cylinder-specific air-mass determination, which makes it more complicated than a sequentially injecting system.

== History ==
The first manifold injection system was designed by Johannes Spiel at Hallesche Maschinenfabrik. Deutz started series production of stationary four-stroke engines with manifold injection in 1898. Grade built the first two-stroke engine with manifold injection in 1906; the first manifold injected series production four-stroke aircraft engines were built by Wright and Antoinette the same year (Antoinette 8V). In 1912, Bosch equipped a watercraft engine with a makeshift injection pump built from an oil pump, but this system did not prove to be reliable. In the 1920s, they attempted to use a diesel engine injection pump in a petrol-fuelled Otto engine. However, they were not successful. In 1930 Moto Guzzi built the first manifold injected Otto engine for motorcycles, which eventually was the first land vehicle engine with manifold injection. From the 1930s until the 1950s, manifold injections systems were not used in passenger cars, despite the fact that such systems existed. This was because the carburetor proved to be a simpler and less expensive, yet sufficient mixture formation system that did not need replacing yet.

In ca. 1950, Daimler-Benz started development of a petrol direct injection system for their Mercedes-Benz sports cars. For passenger cars however, a manifold injection system was deemed more feasible. Eventually, the Mercedes-Benz W 128, W 113, W 189, and W 112 passenger cars were equipped with manifold injected Otto engines.

From 1951 until 1956, FAG Kugelfischer Georg Schäfer & Co. developed the mechanical Kugelfischer injection system. It was used in many passenger cars, such as the Peugeot 404 (1962), Lancia Flavia iniezione (1965), BMW E10 (1969), Ford Capri RS 2600 (1970), BMW E12 (1973), BMW E20 (1973), and the BMW E26 (1978).

In 1957, Bendix Corporation presented the Bendix Electrojector, one of the first electronically controlled manifold injection systems. Bosch built this system under licence, and marketed it from 1967 as the D-Jetronic. In 1973, Bosch introduced their first self-developed multi-point injection systems, the electronic L-Jetronic, and the mechanical, unpowered K-Jetronic. Their fully digital Motronic system was introduced in 1979. It found widespread use in German luxury saloons. At the same time, most American car manufacturers stuck to electronic single-point injection systems. In the mid-1980s, Bosch upgraded their non-Motronic multi-point injection systems with digital engine control units, creating the KE-Jetronic, and the LH-Jetronic. Volkswagen developed the digital Digijet injection system for their "Wasserboxer" water-cooled engines, which evolved into the Volkswagen Digifant system in 1985.

Cheap single-point injection systems that worked with either two-way or three-way catalyst converters, such as the Mono-Jetronic introduced in 1987, enabled car manufacturers to economically offer an alternative to carburetors even in their economy cars, which helped the extensive spread of manifold injection systems across all passenger car market segments during the 1990s. In 1995, Mitsubishi introduced the first petrol direct injection Otto engine for passenger cars, and the petrol direct injection has been replacing the manifold injection since, but not across all market segments; several newly produced passenger car engines still use multi-point injection.
