= Fuel injection =

Feature of internal combustion engines

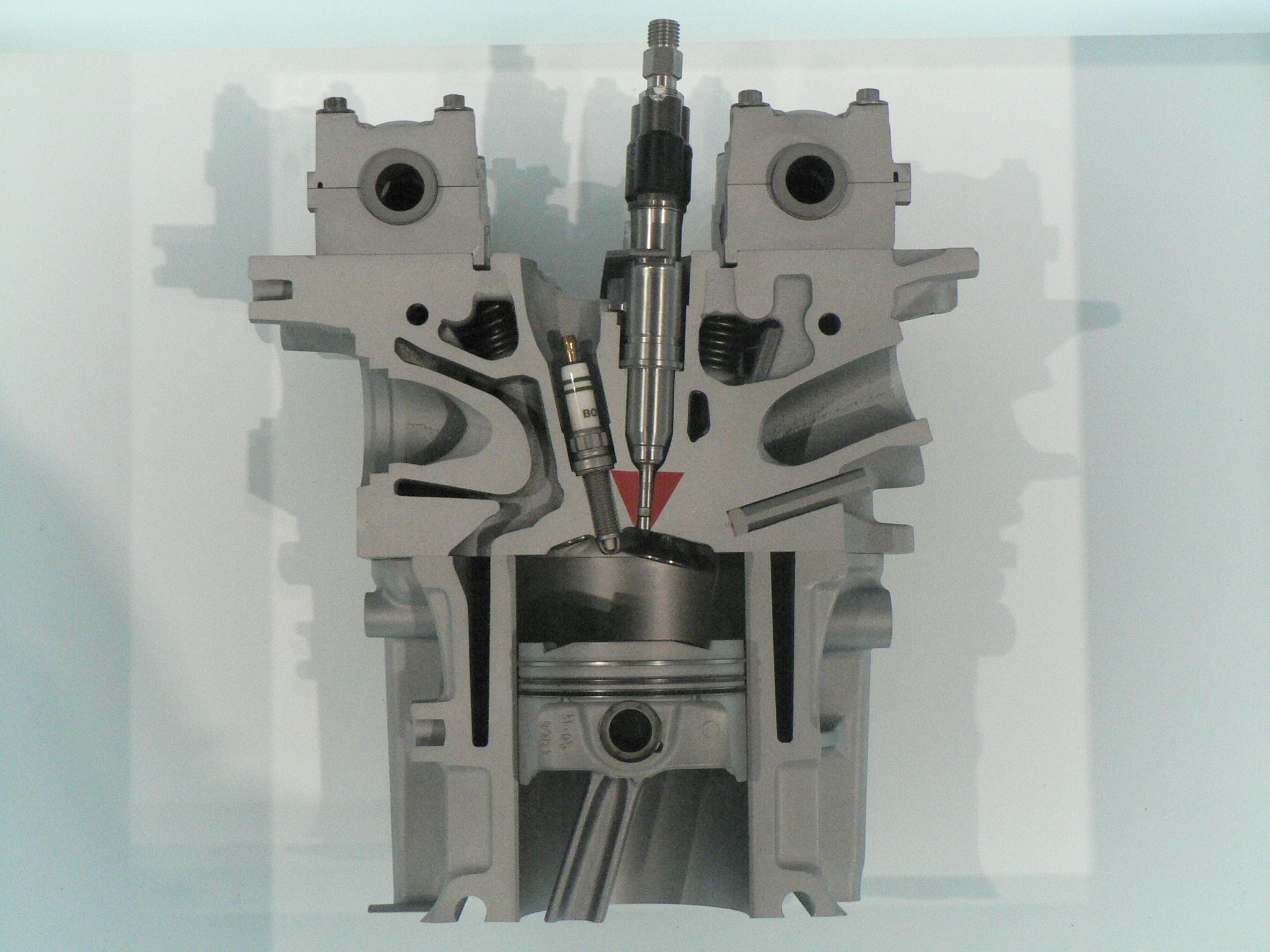
A cutaway model of a petrol direct-injected engine

Fuel injection is the introduction of fuel in an internal combustion engine, most commonly automotive engines, by means of a fuel injector. This article focuses on fuel injection in reciprocating piston and Wankel rotary engines.

All compression-ignition engines (e.g., diesel engines), and many spark-ignition engines (i.e., petrol (gasoline) engines, such as Otto or Wankel), use fuel injection of one kind or another. Mass-produced diesel engines for passenger cars (such as the Mercedes-Benz OM 138) became available in the late 1930s and early 1940s, being the first fuel-injected engines for passenger car use. In passenger car petrol engines, fuel injection was introduced in the early 1950s and gradually gained prevalence until it had largely replaced carburettors by the early 1990s. The primary difference between carburetion and fuel injection is that fuel injection atomizes the fuel through a small nozzle under high pressure. In contrast, carburetion relies on suction created by intake air accelerated through a Venturi tube to draw fuel into the airstream.

The term "fuel injection" is vague and encompasses various distinct systems with fundamentally different functional principles. The only commonality among fuel injection systems is the absence of carburetion.

There are two main functional principles of mixture formation systems for internal combustion engines: "internal" and "external." A fuel injection system that uses external mixture formation is called a manifold injection system. There exist two types of manifold injection systems: multi-point (or "port") and single-point (or "throttle body") injection.

Internal mixture formation systems can be separated into several varieties of "direct" and "indirect" injection; the most common is common rail injection, a form of direct injection. The term "electronic fuel injection" refers to any fuel injection system controlled by an engine control unit.

== System functions ==
=== Pressurising fuel ===
Fuel injection sprays pressurised fuel into the engine. Therefore a device to pressurise the fuel is needed, such as a fuel pump.

=== Metering fuel ===
The system must determine the appropriate amount of fuel to be supplied and control the fuel flow to deliver it.

Several early mechanical injection systems used relatively sophisticated helix-controlled injection pump(s) that both metered fuel and created injection pressure. Since the 1980s, electronic systems have been used to control fuel metering. More recent systems use an electronic engine control unit, which meters the fuel and controls the ignition timing and various other engine functions.

=== Injecting fuel ===
The fuel injector is essentially a spray nozzle that delivers fuel to the engine during the final stage of fuel delivery. The injector is located in the combustion chamber, inlet manifold, or – less commonly – the throttle body.

Fuel injectors that also control the metering, are called "injection valves", while injectors that perform all three functions are called "unit injectors".

== Direct injection systems ==
Direct injection means that the fuel is injected into the main combustion chamber of each cylinder. As air and fuel are mixed only inside the combustion chamber, air alone is sucked into the engine during the intake stroke. The injection scheme is always intermittent (either sequential or cylinder-individual).

Fuel is injected directly into the combustion chamber either with a blast of air or hydraulically; the former was rendered obsolete in automotive engines in the early 20th century by the invention of the precombustion chamber.

Typically, hydraulic direct injection systems spray fuel into the air inside the cylinder, or combustion chamber. Direct injection can be achieved with a conventional helix-controlled injection pump, unit injectors, or a sophisticated common-rail injection system. The last is the most common system in modern automotive engines.

=== Direct injection for petrol engines ===
During the 20th century, most petrol engines used either a carburettor or indirect fuel injection. Use of direct injection in petrol engines has become increasingly common in the 21st century.

=== Common-rail injection systems ===
In a common-rail system, fuel from the fuel tank is supplied to a common header (called the accumulator), and then sent through tubing to the injectors, which inject it into the combustion chambers. The accumulator has a high-pressure relief valve to maintain pressure and return the excess fuel to the fuel tank. The fuel is sprayed with the help of a nozzle that is opened and closed with a solenoid-operated needle valve. Third-generation common-rail diesels use piezoelectric injectors for increased precision, with fuel pressures up to 300 MPa or 44,000 psi.

The types of common-rail systems include air-guided injection and spray-guided injection.

=== Unit injector systems ===
Used by diesel engines, these systems include:

- Pumpe-Düse
- Pump-rail-nozzle system

=== Helix-controlled pump systems ===
This injection method was previously used in many diesel engines. Types of systems include:

- Lanova direct injection
- Afterchamber injection
- G-System (sphere combustion chamber)
- Gardner system (hemisphere combustion chamber)
- Saurer system (torus combustion chamber)
- Flat piston (combustion chamber between piston and head)

=== Other systems ===
The M-System, used in some diesel engines from the 1960s to the 1980s, sprayed the fuel onto the walls of the combustion chamber, as opposed to most other direct-injection systems which spray the fuel into the middle of the chamber.

== Indirect injection systems ==
=== Manifold injection ===
Manifold injection systems are common in petrol-fuelled engines such as Otto and Wankel engines. In a manifold injection system, air and fuel are mixed outside the combustion chamber, then sucked into the engine. The main types of manifold injection systems are "multi-point" and "single-point" injection.

These systems use either a "continuous" or an "intermittent" injection design. In a continuous injection system, fuel flows at all times from the fuel injectors, but at a variable flow rate. The most common automotive continuous-injection system is the multi-point Bosch K-Jetronic system, introduced in 1974 and used by various car manufacturers until the mid-1990s. Intermittent injection systems can be sequential, in which injection is timed to coincide with each cylinder's intake stroke; batched, in which fuel is injected to the cylinders in groups, without precise synchronization to any particular cylinder's intake stroke; simultaneous, in which fuel is injected at the same time to all the cylinders; or cylinder-individual, in which the engine control unit can adjust the injection for each cylinder individually.

==== Multi-point injection ====
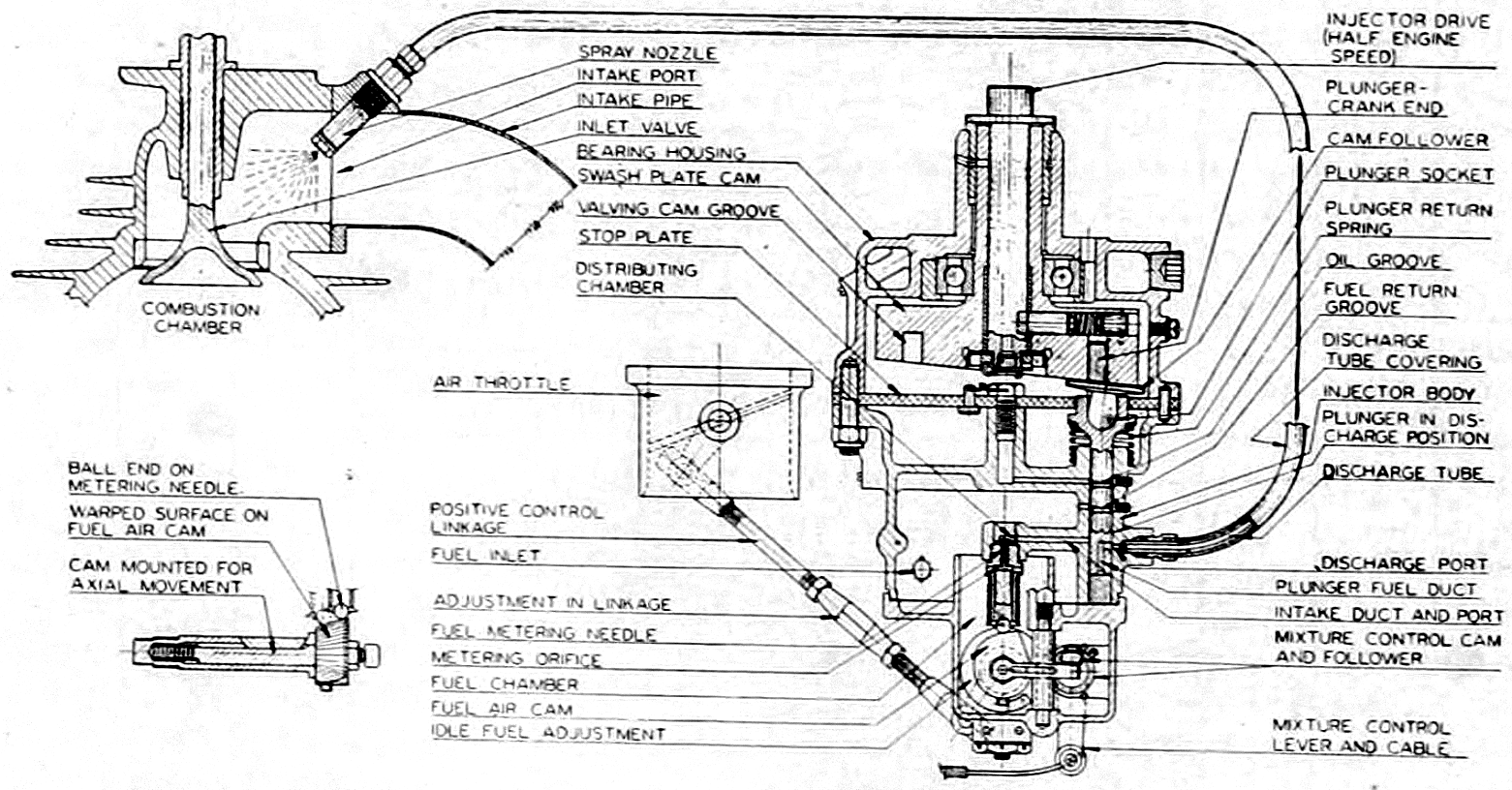
Schematic of a mechanical port injection system

Multi-point injection (also called 'port injection') injects fuel into the intake ports just upstream of each cylinder's intake valve, rather than at a central point within an intake manifold. Typically, multi-point injected systems use multiple fuel injectors, but some systems, such as GM's central port injection system, use tubes with poppet valves fed by a central injector instead of multiple injectors.

==== Single-point injection ====
Single-point injection (also called 'throttle-body injection') uses one injector in a throttle body mounted similarly to a carburettor on an intake manifold. As in a carburetted induction system, the fuel is mixed with the air before entering the intake manifold. Single-point injection was a relatively low-cost way for automakers to reduce exhaust emissions to comply with tightening regulations while providing better "driveability" (easy starting, smooth running, no engine stuttering) than could be obtained with a carburettor. Many of the carburettor's supporting components—such as the air filter, intake manifold, and fuel line routing—could be used with few or no changes. This postponed the redesign and tooling costs of these components. Single-point injection was used extensively on American-made passenger cars and light trucks during 1980–1995, and in some European cars in the early and mid-1990s. In the US, the G10 engine in the 2000 Chevrolet Metro became the last engine available on an American-sold vehicle to use throttle body injection.

=== Diesel engines ===
In indirect-injected diesel engines (as well as Akroyd engines), there are two combustion chambers: the main combustion chamber, and a pre-chamber (also called an ante-chamber) that is connected to the main one. The fuel is injected only into the pre-chamber (where it begins to combust), and not directly into the main combustion chamber. Therefore, this principle is called indirect injection. There exist several slightly different indirect injection systems that have similar characteristics.

Types of indirect injection used by diesel engines include:

- Precombustion-chamber injection
- Air-cell chamber injection

== History ==
=== 1870s–1930s: early systems ===
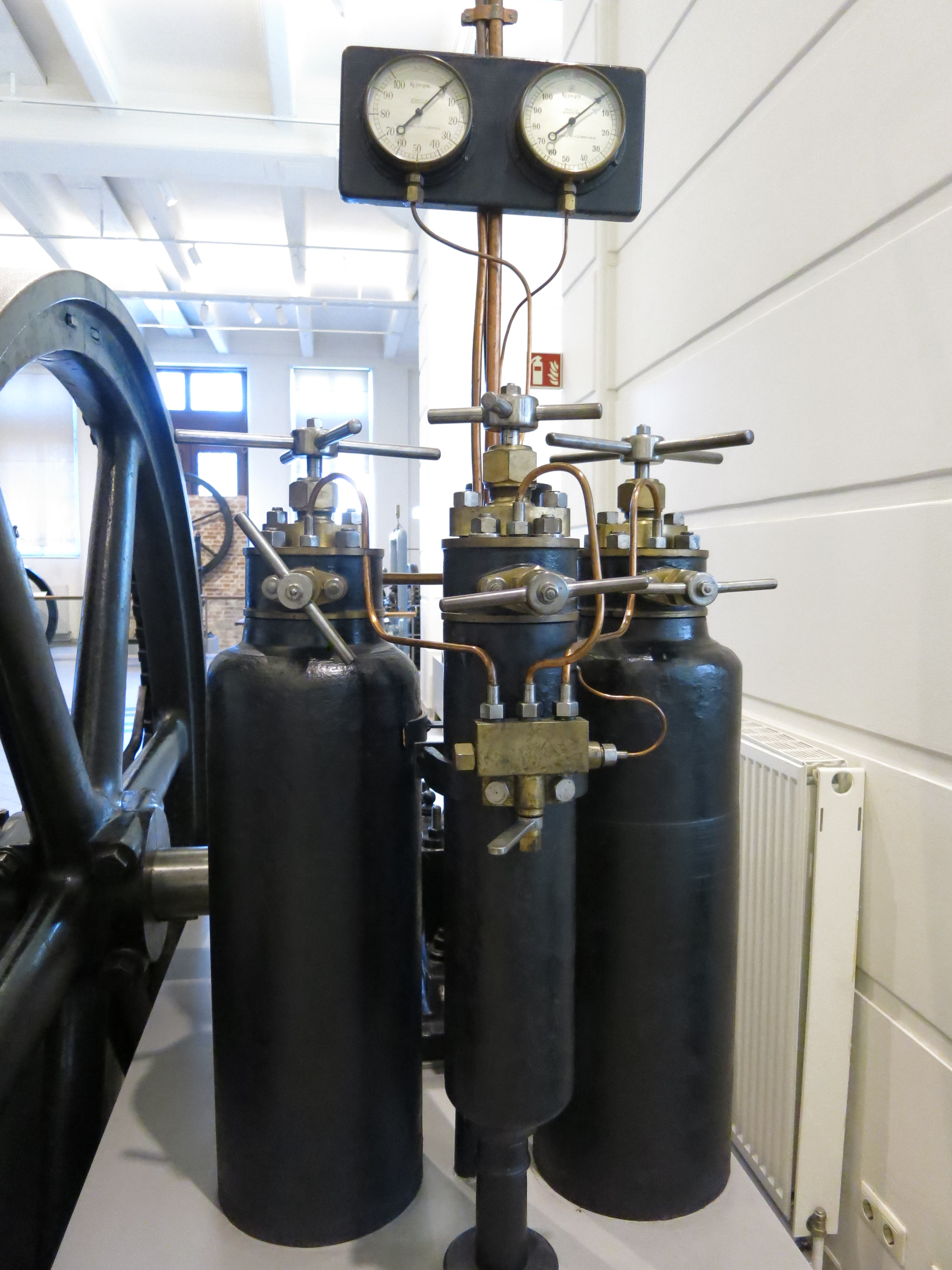
Air-blast injection system for an 1898 diesel engine

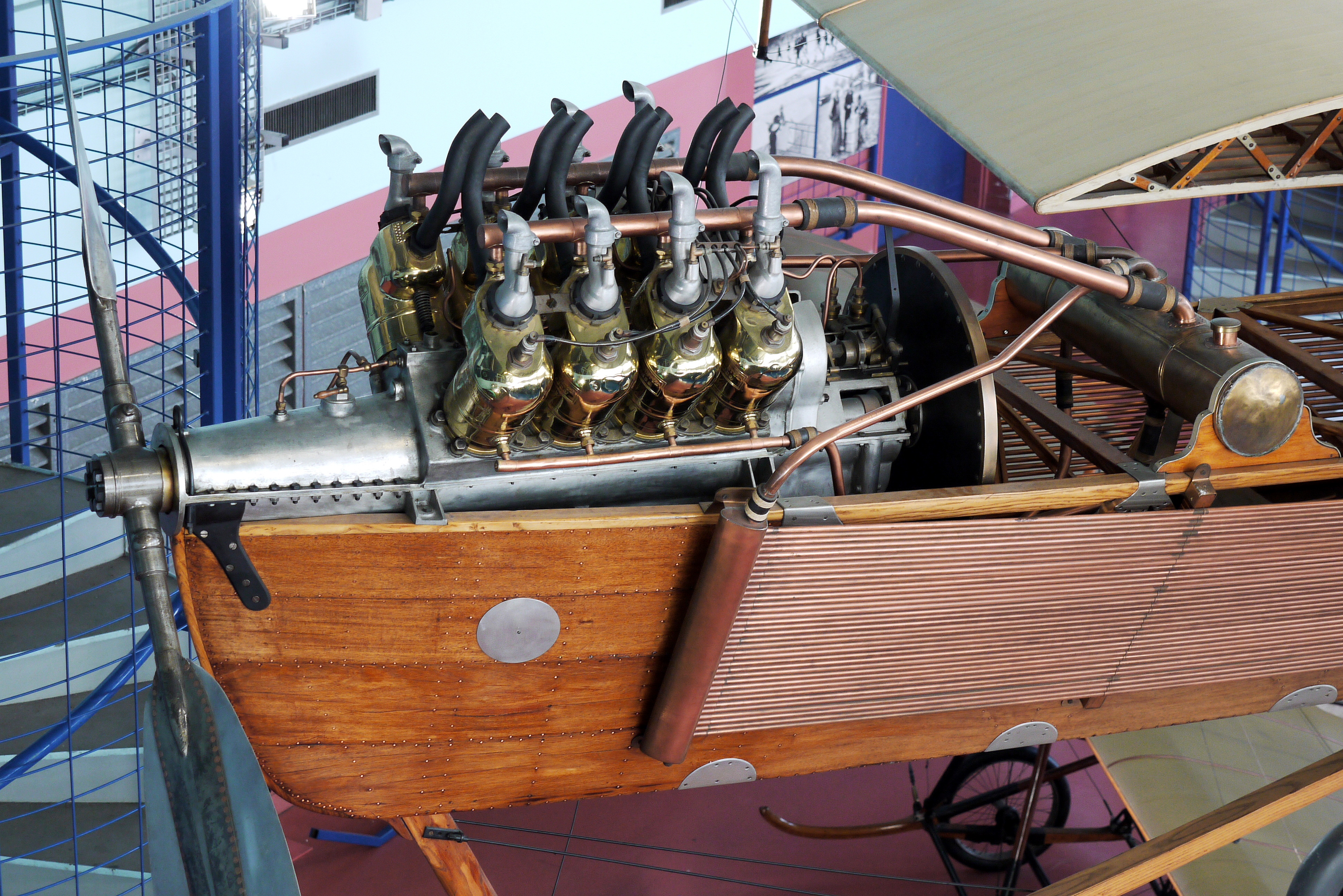
Mechanical port injection system on a 1906 Antoinette 8V engine

In 1872, George Bailey Brayton obtained a patent on an internal combustion engine that used a pneumatic fuel injection system, also invented by Brayton: air-blast injection. In 1894, Rudolf Diesel copied Brayton's air-blast injection system for the diesel engine, but also improved it. He increased the air blast pressure from 390–490 kPa (57–71 psi) to 6,400 kPa (920 psi). In the meantime, the first manifold injection system was designed by Johannes Spiel in 1884, while working at Hallesche Maschinenfabrik in Germany.

In 1891, the British Herbert-Akroyd oil engine became the first engine to use a pressurised fuel injection system. This design, called a hot-bulb engine used a 'jerk pump' to dispense fuel oil at high pressure to an injector. Another development in early diesel engines was the pre-combustion chamber, which was invented in 1919 by Prosper l'Orange to avoid the drawbacks of air-blast injection systems. The pre-combustion chamber made it feasible to produce engines in size suitable for automobiles and MAN Truck & Bus presented the first direct-injected diesel engine for trucks in 1924. Higher pressure diesel injection pumps were introduced by Bosch in 1927.

In 1898, German company Deutz AG started producing four-stroke petrol stationary engines with manifold injection. The 1906 Antoinette 8V aircraft engine (the world's first V8 engine) was another early four-stroke engine that used manifold injection. The first petrol engine with direct-injection was a two-stroke aircraft engine designed by Otto Mader in 1916. Another early spark-ignition engine to use direct-injection was the 1925 Hesselman engine, designed by Swedish engineer Jonas Hesselman. This engine could run on a variety of fuels (such as oil, kerosene, petrol or diesel oil) and used a stratified charge principle whereby fuel is injected towards the end of the compression stroke, then ignited with a spark plug.

The Cummins Model H diesel truck engine was introduced in America in 1933. In 1936, the Mercedes-Benz OM 138 diesel engine (using a precombustion chamber) became one of the first fuel-injected engines used in a mass-production passenger car.

=== 1940s–1950s: WWII aircraft and early direct-injection petrol engines ===
During World War II, several petrol engines for aircraft used direct-injection systems, such as the European Junkers Jumo 210, Daimler-Benz DB 601, BMW 801, and the Shvetsov ASh-82FN (M-82FN). The German direct-injection systems were based on diesel injection systems used by Bosch, Deckel, Junkers and l'Orange. By around 1943, the Rolls-Royce Merlin and Wright R-3350 had switched from traditional carburettors to fuel injection (called "pressure carburettors" at the time), however these engines used throttle body manifold injection, rather than the direct-injection systems of the German engines. From 1940, the Mitsubishi Kinsei 60 series engine used a direct-injection system, along with the related Mitsubishi Kasei engine from 1941. In 1943, a low-pressure fuel injection system was added to the Nakajima Homare Model 23 radial engine.

The first mass-produced petrol direct-injection system was developed by Bosch and was initially used in small automotive two-stroke petrol engines. Introduced in the 1950 Goliath GP700 small saloon, it was also added to the Gutbrod Superior engine in 1952. This mechanically controlled system was essentially a specially lubricated high-pressure diesel direct-injection pump of the type that is governed by the vacuum behind an intake throttle valve. A Bosch mechanical direct-injection system was also used in the straight-eight used in the 1954 Mercedes-Benz W196 Formula One racing car. The first four-stroke direct-injection petrol engine for a passenger car was released the following year, in the Mercedes-Benz 300SL sports car. However the engine suffered lubrication problems due to petrol diluting the engine oil, and subsequent Mercedes-Benz engines were switched to a manifold injection design. Likewise, most petrol injection systems before the 2000s used the less-expensive manifold injection design.

=== 1950s–1970s: manifold injection for petrol engines ===
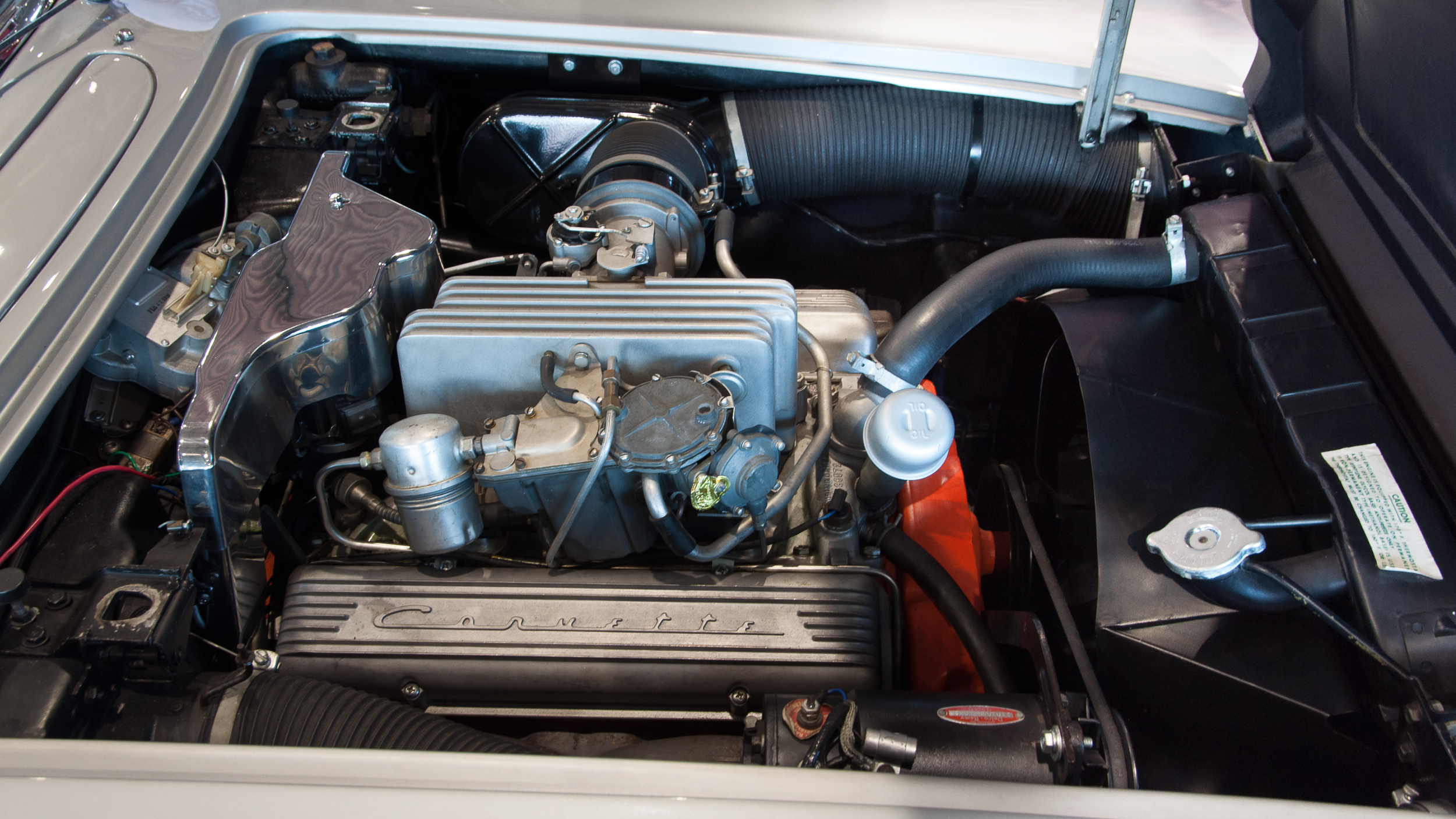
1950s Rochester Ramjet mechanical port injection system (on a Chevrolet 283 engine)

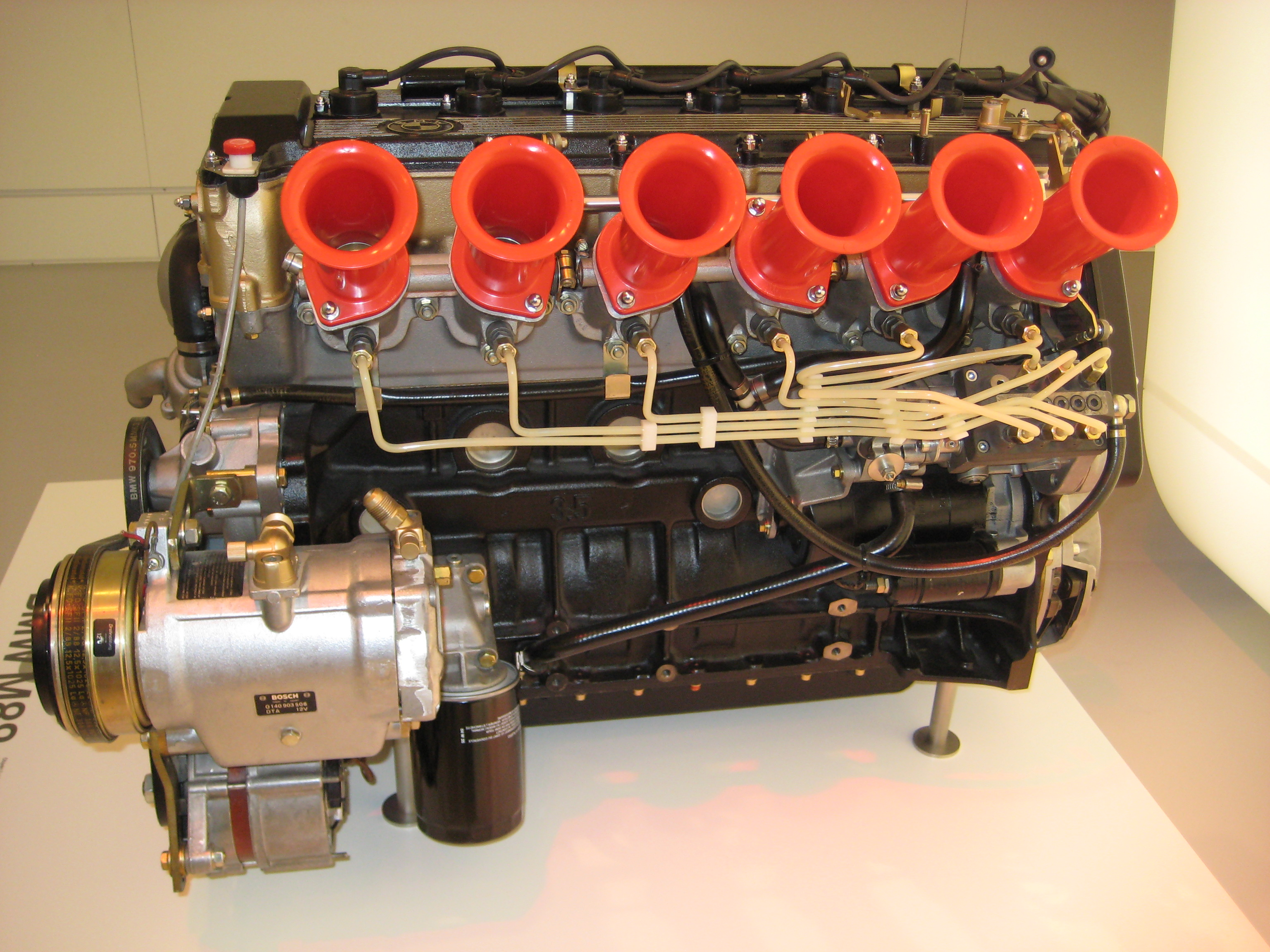
1970s Kugelfischer mechanical port injection system (on a BMW M88 engine)

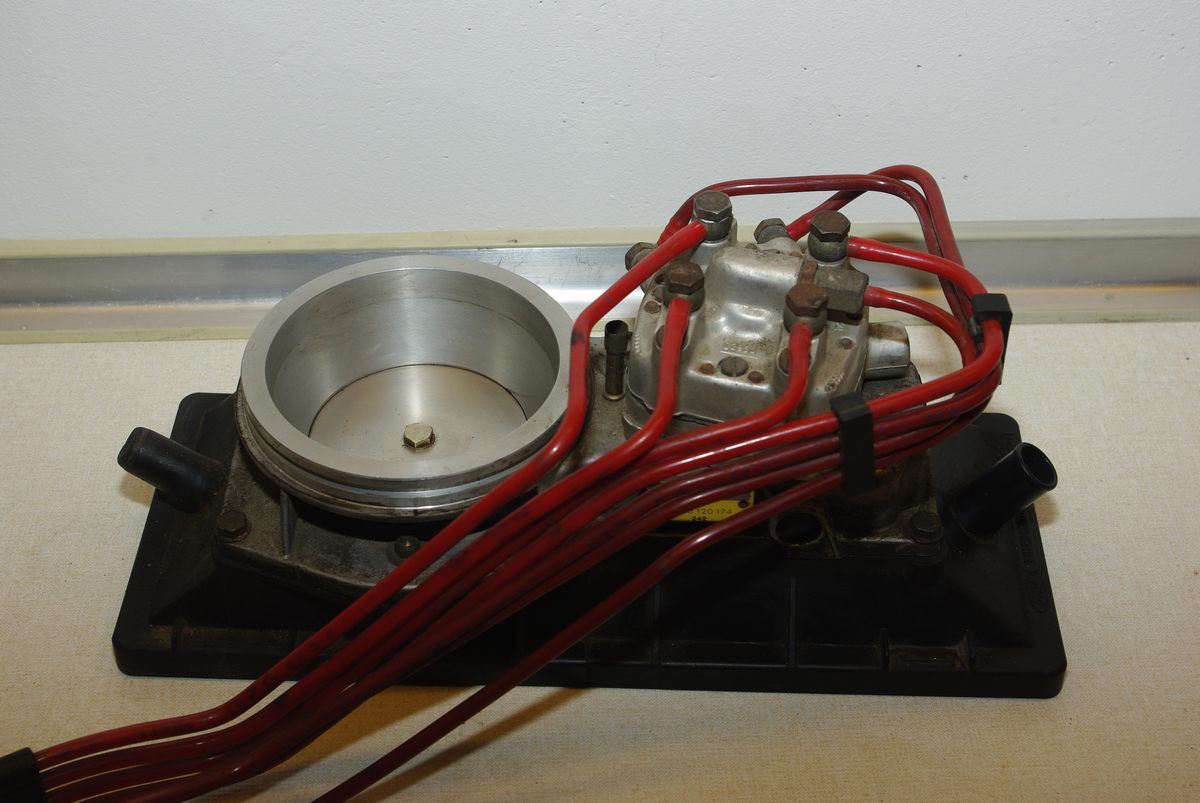
Components of a 1970s K-Jetronic electronic port injection system

Throughout the 1950s, several manufacturers introduced their manifold injection systems for petrol engines. Lucas Industries had begun developing a fuel injection system in 1941. By 1956 it was used in Jaguar racing cars. At the 1957 24 Hours of Le Mans, the 1st to 4th placed cars were Jaguar D-Type entries using a Lucas fuel injection system. Also in 1957, General Motors introduced the Rochester Ramjet option, consisting of a fuel injection system for the V8 engine in the Chevrolet Corvette. During the 1960s, fuel injection systems were also produced by Hilborn, SPICA, and Kugelfischer.

Up until this time, the fuel injection systems had used a mechanical control system. In 1957, the American Bendix Electrojector system was introduced, which used analogue electronics for the control system. The Electrojector was intended to be available for American Motors' new Rambler Rebel featuring AMC's new 327 cu in (5.4 L) V8 engine. However, reliability problems meant that the fuel injection option was not offered to customers. In 1958, the Chrysler 300D, DeSoto Adventurer, Dodge D-500 and Plymouth Fury offered the Electrojector system, becoming the first cars known to use an electronic fuel injection (EFI) system.

The Electrojector patents were subsequently sold to Bosch, who developed the Electrojector into the Bosch D-Jetronic. The D-Jetronic was produced from 1967 through 1976 and first used on the VW 1600TL/E. The system was a speed/density system that used engine speed and intake manifold air density to calculate the amount of fuel to inject. In 1974, Bosch introduced the K-Jetronic system, which used a continuous fuel flow from the injectors (rather than the pulsed flow of the D-Jetronic system). K-Jetronic was a mechanical injection system, using a plunger actuated by the intake manifold pressure, which then controlled the fuel flow to the injectors.

Also in 1974, Bosch introduced the L-Jetronic system, a pulsed-flow system that used an air flow meter to calculate the amount of fuel required. L-Jetronic was widely adopted on European cars during the 1970s and 1980s. As a system that uses electronically controlled fuel injectors which open and close to control the amount of fuel entering the engine, the L-Jetronic system uses the same basic principles as modern electronic fuel injection (EFI) systems.

=== 1980s–present: digital electronics and common-rail injection ===
Prior to 1979, the electronics in fuel injection systems used analogue electronics for the control system. The Bosch Motronic multi-point fuel injection system (also amongst the first systems where the ignition system is controlled by the same device as the fuel injection system) was the first mass-produced system to use digital electronics. The Ford EEC-III single-point fuel injection system, introduced in 1980, was another early digital fuel injection system. These and other electronic manifold injection systems (using either port injection or throttle-body injection) became more widespread through the 1980s, and by the early 1990s they had replaced carburettors in most new petrol-engined cars sold in developed countries.

The aforementioned injection systems for petrol passenger car engines – except for the 1954–1959 Mercedes-Benz 300 SL – all used manifold injection (i.e. the injectors located at the intake ports or throttle body, instead of inside the combustion chamber). This began to change when the first mass-produced petrol direct injection system for passenger cars was a common rail system introduced in the 1997 Mitsubishi 6G74 V6 engine. The first common-rail system for a passenger car diesel engine was the 1997 model Alfa Romeo 156 2.4 JTD. The five-cylinder turbodiesel featured a high-pressure direct injection system developed by the Fiat Group and Magneteti Marelli and made by Bosch.

Since the 2010s, many petrol engines have switched to direct-injection (sometimes in combination with separate manifold injectors for each cylinder). Similarly, many modern diesel engines use a common-rail design.

Stratified charge injection was used in several petrol engines in the early 2000s, such as the Volkswagen 1.4 FSI engine introduced in 2000. However, the stratified charge systems were largely no longer in use by the late 2010s, due to increased exhaust emissions of NO_{x} gasses and particulates, along with the increased cost and complexity of the systems.

== See also ==
- Carburettor
- Common rail
- Diesel engine
- Jacketed fuel injection pipe
- Petrol direct injection
- Indirect injection
- Unit injector for diesel engines
