= Bendix Electrojector =

Electronic multi-point fuel injection system

The Bendix Electrojector was a trade name for an electronically controlled multi-point manifold injection (EFI) fuel injection system developed and made by Bendix Corporation. In 1957, American Motors Corporation (AMC) offered the Electrojector as an option in some of its cars; Chrysler followed in 1958.

The system proved to be so unreliable that conventional carburetors soon replaced it. Bendix then sold the Electrojector patents to German car component supplier Bosch. Developed over the next seven years with transistors as they became available, Bosch renamed it the D-Jetronic and introduced it in the 1967 Volkswagen Type 3.

== Description ==
The Electrojector is an electronic multi-point manifold injection system with an analog engine control unit, the so-called "modulator" that uses the intake manifold vacuum and the engine speed for metering the correct amount of fuel. The fuel is injected intermittently, and with a constant pressure of 1.4 kp/cm^{2} (20 psi; 137 kPa) provided by an electric fuel pump in the gas tank. The injectors are spring-loaded, actuated by a modulator-controlled electromagnet. Pulse-width modulation is used to change the amount of injected fuel: since the injection pressure is constant, the fuel amount can only be changed by increasing or decreasing the injection pulse duration. The modulator receives the injection pulse from a generator that rotates in sync with the ignition distributor. The modulator converts the injection pulse into an injection signal for each fuel injector primarily by using the intake manifold and crankshaft speed sensor signals. Unlike modern EFI systems, the Electrojector used analog circuits and vacuum tubes in the control unit. Transistors were expensive, and microprocessors did not exist. The analog technology also supports setting the correct idle speed, mixture enrichment, and coolant temperature using additional resistors in the modulator.

== History ==
The Eclipse Aviation division of Bendix, maker of aircraft carburetors, began experiments in 1953 with electronic fuel injection, and vehicles with prototype EFI systems were on the road in 1955.

The Electrojector system was first offered by American Motors Corporation (AMC) in 1957. The automaker introduced a performance model, the Rambler Rebel, and used it to promote AMC's new 327 cu in (5 L) engine. The Electrojector-injected engine was an option and rated at 288 bhp (215 kW; 292 PS). Using a single throttle body the engine produced peak torque 500 rpm lower than the equivalent carburetor-equipped engine

The price of the EFI option was US$395, and it was available on 15 June 1957. The new 327 cu in (5 L) engine with Electrojector system was on display next to a Rambler Rebel during the 1957 New York International Auto Show.

According to AMC, the price would be significantly less than Chevrolet's mechanical fuel injection option. In contrast, the Rochester Ramjet constant-flow system utilized a throttle body and vacuum signals to measure airflow and meter fuel into the intake ports mechanically, but had no sensors to compensate for the range of operating conditions, such as temperature and altitude.

Initial problems with the Electrojector meant only pre-production cars had it installed, so very few cars were sold. None were made available to the public. The EFI system in the Rambler worked well in warm weather, but the engine was difficult to start in cooler temperatures. One of the problems was the control unit's vacuum tubes that needed at least 30 seconds or more to warm up, as well as a conventional thermostatic coil and fast-idle cam for cold operation.

Chrysler offered Electrojector on the 1958 Chrysler 300D, DeSoto Adventurer, Dodge D-500, and Plymouth Fury. Chrysler named the system "Jetpower" and the control unit an "integrator." The system was similar to AMC's, but Chrysler used two throttle bodies, a primary and a secondary. The option added $400 to the cost of the already expensive top-of-the-line models.

Early electronic components were unreliable in an underhood environment and could not be easily modified as engine control requirements advanced. Similar to the AMC's experience, the wires and electrical unit easily deteriorate under heat, vibration, and time, and the system's radio signaling is interfered with by AM radio stations and police band transmissions. Almost all of the 35 Chrysler vehicles originally equipped with Electrojector were retrofitted with four-barrel carburetors.

Work on the Electrojector ended in 1960 because there was no value in a system that cost twenty times that of a conventional $10 carburetor. Bendix and Bosch entered into a licensing agreement for its patents as more stringent emissions standards required better fuel-air control.

Bosch developed the D-Jetronic (D for Druckfühlergesteuert, German for "pressure-sensor-controlled"), from the Electrojector, which was first used on the VW 1600TL/E in 1967. This was a speed/density system, using engine speed and intake manifold air density to calculate "air mass" flow rate and thus fuel requirements. Volkswagen, Mercedes-Benz, Porsche, Citroën, Saab, and Volvo adopted this system. Lucas licensed the system for production in Jaguar cars, initially in D-Jetronic form, before switching to L-Jetronic in 1978 on the XK6 engine.

== Notes ==
- Winkler, A.H.; Sutton, R.W. (31 December 1956). "Electrojector Bendix Electronic Fuel Injection System". SAE Technical Paper 570060. doi:10.4271/570060.
