= Jacketed fuel injection pipe =

A jacketed fuel injection pipe (also known as double walled, twin walled or sheathed fuel injection pipe) is a special type of fuel injection pipe fitted to diesel engines.

The pipe incorporates an outer jacket that shrouds the inner high pressure pipe. This jacket is usually metallic in construction and can either be a thin walled tube or convoluted hose. In the event of a burst in the injection pipe the leaking fuel will be collected by the jacket and piped away safely to an alarm device to notify operators of a potential problem.

Jacket fuel lines are found predominantly in marine applications. Adoption in power generation is becoming more common.

== Legislation ==
In 1994 the International Maritime Organization required all ships subject to SOLAS to be fitted with jacketed fuel lines. Existing vessels and new builds constructed before 1998 were required to comply by 1 July 2003.

External high-pressure fuel delivery lines between the high-pressure fuel pumps and fuel injectors shall be protected with a jacketed piping system capable of containing fuel from a high-pressure line failure. A jacketed pipe incorporates an outer pipe into which the high-pressure fuel pipe is placed, forming a permanent assembly. The jacketed piping system shall include a means for collection of leakages and arrangements shall be provided with an alarm in case of a fuel line failure.

— IMO, Resolution MSC.31(63), 1994

Dispensation was given to engines smaller than 375 kW (500 hp) providing they were fitted in a suitable enclosure. In 2006 the IMO relaxed the regulation by applying it only to ships constructed on or after 1 February 1992, but without engine power limitation.
