= Jetronic =

Fuel injection technology for automotive petrol engines

Jetronic is a trade name of a manifold injection technology for automotive petrol engines, developed and marketed by Robert Bosch GmbH from the 1960s onwards. Bosch licensed the concept to many automobile manufacturers. There are numerous variations of the technology offering technological development and refinement, all but the Mono-Jetronic (produced 1988-1995) being multi-point injection systems.

== D-Jetronic (1967–1979) ==
Analogue multi-point fuel injection, 'D' is from German: "Druck" meaning pressure. Inlet manifold vacuum is measured using a pressure sensor located in, or connected to the intake manifold, in order to calculate the duration of fuel injection pulses. Originally, this system was called Jetronic, but the name D-Jetronic was later created as a retronym to distinguish it from subsequent Jetronic iterations.

D-Jetronic was essentially a further refinement of the Electrojector fuel delivery system developed by the Bendix Corporation in the late 1950s. Rather than choosing to eradicate the various reliability issues with the Electrojector system, Bendix instead licensed the design to Bosch. With the role of the Bendix system being largely forgotten D-Jetronic became known as the first widely successful precursor of modern electronic common rail systems; it had constant pressure fuel delivery to the injectors and pulsed injections, albeit grouped (2 groups of injectors pulsed together) rather than sequential (individual injector pulses) as on later systems.

As in the Electrojector system, D-Jetronic used analogue circuitry, with no microprocessor nor digital logic. The electronic control unit (ECU) used about 25 transistors to perform all of the processing. Two important factors that led to the ultimate failure of the Electrojector system: the use of paper-wrapped capacitors unsuited to heat-cycling, and amplitude modulation (tv/ham radio) signals to control the injectors were superseded. The still present lack of processing power and the unavailability of solid-state sensors meant that the vacuum sensor was a rather expensive precision instrument, rather like a barometer, with brass bellows inside to measure the manifold pressure.

Although conceptually similar to most later systems with individual electrically controlled injectors per cylinder, and pulse-width modulated fuel delivery, the fuel pressure was not modulated by manifold pressure, and the injectors were fired only once per 2 revolutions on the engine (with half of the injectors being fired each revolution).

The system was last used (with a Lucas designed timing mechanism and Lucas labels super-imposed on some components) on the Jaguar V12 engine (XJ12 and XJ-S) from 1975 until 1979.

== K-Jetronic (1973–1994) ==
Mechanical multi-point fuel injection, 'K' stands for German: "Kontinuierlich", meaning continuous. Commonly called Continuous Injection System (CIS) in the USA. K-Jetronic is different from pulsed injection systems in that the fuel flows continuously from all injectors, while the fuel pump pressurises the fuel up to approximately 5 bar (73.5 psi). The volume of air taken in by the engine is measured to determine the amount of fuel to inject. This system has no lambda loop or lambda control. K-Jetronic debuted in the 1973.5 Porsche 911T in January 1973 and was later installed into a number of automobiles from manufacturers including Porsche, Volkswagen, Audi, BMW, Mercedes-Benz, Rolls-Royce, Bentley, Lotus, Ferrari, Peugeot, Nissan, Renault, Volvo, Saab, TVR and Ford. The last car to use K-Jetronic was the 1994 Porsche 911 Turbo 3.6.

Fuel is pumped from the tank to a large control valve called a fuel distributor, which divides the single fuel supply line from the tank into smaller lines, one for each injector. The fuel distributor is mounted atop a control vane through which all intake air must pass, and the system works by varying fuel volume supplied to the injectors based on the angle of a moving vane in the air flow meter, which in turn is determined by the volume of air passing the vane, and by the control pressure. The control pressure is regulated with a mechanical device called the control pressure regulator (CPR) or the warm-up regulator (WUR). Depending on the model, the CPR may be used to compensate for altitude, full load, and/or a cold engine. The injectors are simple spring-loaded check valves with nozzles; once fuel system pressure becomes high enough to overcome the counterspring, the injectors begin spraying.

== K-Jetronic (Lambda) ==
First introduced on the PRV V6, appearing initially in the Volvo 264 in 1974 and later used in other cars such as the Peugeot 504 and 604, Renault 30, and in the DMC DeLorean in 1981. A variant of K-Jetronic with closed-loop lambda control, also named Ku-Jetronic, the letter u denominating USA, came in the US version of Porsche 911 in 1980-1983. The system was developed to comply with U.S.A. state of California's California Air Resources Board exhaust emission regulations, and later replaced by KE-Jetronic.

== KE-Jetronic (1985–1993) ==
Electronically controlled mechanical fuel injection. The engine control unit (ECU) may be either analog or digital, and the system may or may not have closed-loop lambda control. The system is based on the K-Jetronic mechanical system, with the addition of an electro-hydraulic actuator, essentially a fuel injector inline with the fuel return. Instead of injecting fuel into the intake, this injector allows fuel to bypass the fuel distributor, which varies the fuel pressure supplied to the mechanical injection components based on several inputs (engine speed, air pressure, coolant temperature, throttle position, lambda etc.) via the ECU. With the electronics disconnected, this system will operate as a K-Jetronic system.

Commonly known as 'CIS-E' in the USA. The later KE3 (CIS-E III) variant features knock sensing capabilities.

== L-Jetronic (1974–1989) ==
L-Jetronic is an analog fuel injection system. It was often called Air-Flow Controlled (AFC) injection to further separate it from the pressure-controlled D-Jetronic — with the 'L' in its name derived from German: luft, meaning 'air'. In the system, air flow into the engine is measured by a moving vane (indicating engine load) known as the volume air flow sensor (VAF) — referred to in German documentation as the LuftMengenMesser or LMM. L-Jetronic used custom-designed integrated circuits, resulting in a simpler and more reliable engine control unit (ECU) than the D-Jetronic's.

L-Jetronic was used heavily in 1980s-era European cars, as well as BMW K-Series motorcycles. Licensing some of Bosch's L-Jetronic concepts and technologies, Lucas, Hitachi Automotive Products, NipponDenso, and others produced similar fuel injection systems for Asian car manufacturers. L-Jetronic manufactured under license by Japan Electronic Control Systems was fitted to the 1980 Kawasaki Z1000-H1, the world's first production fuel injected motorcycle. Despite physical similarity between L-Jetronic components and those produced under license by other manufacturers, the non-Bosch systems should not be called L-Jetronic, and the parts are usually incompatible.

== LE1-Jetronic, LE2-Jetronic, LE3-Jetronic (1981–1991) ==
This is a simplified and more modern variant of L-Jetronic. The ECU was much cheaper to produce due to more modern components, and was more standardised than the L-Jetronic ECUs. As per L-Jetronic, a vane-type airflow sensor is used. Compared with L-Jetronic, the fuel injectors used by LE-Jetronic have a higher impedance. Three variants of LE-Jetronic exist: LE1, the initial version. LE2 (1984–), featured cold start functionality integrated in the ECU, which does not require the cold start injector and thermo time switch used by older systems. LE3 (1989–), featuring miniaturised ECU with hybrid technology, integrated into the junction box of the mass airflow meter.

== LU1-Jetronic, LU2-Jetronic (1983–1991) ==
The same as LE1-Jetronic and LE2-Jetronic respectively, but with closed-loop lambda control. Initially designed for the US market.

== LH-Jetronic (1982–1998) ==
Digital fuel injection, introduced for California bound 1982 Volvo 240 models. The 'LH' stands for German: "Luftmasse-Hitzdraht" - the hotwire anemometer technology used to determine the mass of air into the engine. This air mass meter is called HLM2 (Hitzdrahtluftmassenmesser 2) by Bosch. The LH-Jetronic was mostly used by Scandinavian car manufacturers, and by sports and luxury cars produced in small quantities, such as Porsche 928. The most common variants are LH 2.2, which uses an Intel 8049 (MCS-48) microcontroller, and usually a 4 KB programme memory, and LH 2.4, which uses a Siemens 80535 microcontroller (a variant of Intel's 8051/MCS-51 architecture) and 32 kB programme memory based on the 27C256 chip. LH-Jetronic 2.4 has adaptive lambda control, and support for a variety of advanced features; including fuel enrichment based on exhaust gas temperature (ex. Volvo B204GT/B204FT engines). Some later (post-1995) versions contain hardware support for first generation diagnostics according to ISO 9141 (a.k.a. OBD-II) and immobiliser functions.

== Mono-Jetronic (1988–1995) ==
Digital fuel injection. This system features one centrally positioned fuel injection nozzle. In the US, this kind of single-point injection was marketed as 'throttle body injection' (TBI, by GM), or 'central fuel injection' (CFI, by Ford).

Mono-Jetronic is different from all other known single-point systems, in that it only relies on a throttle position sensor for judging the engine load. There are no sensors for air flow, or intake manifold vacuum. Mono-Jetronic always had adaptive closed-loop lambda control, and due to the simple engine load sensing, it is heavily dependent on the lambda sensor for correct functioning.

The ECU uses an Intel 8051 microcontroller, usually with 16 KB of programme memory and without advanced on-board diagnostics (OBD-II became a requirement in model-year 1996.)

== See also ==
- Motronic
