= Rochester Ramjet =

Automotive fuel injection system used 1957-1965

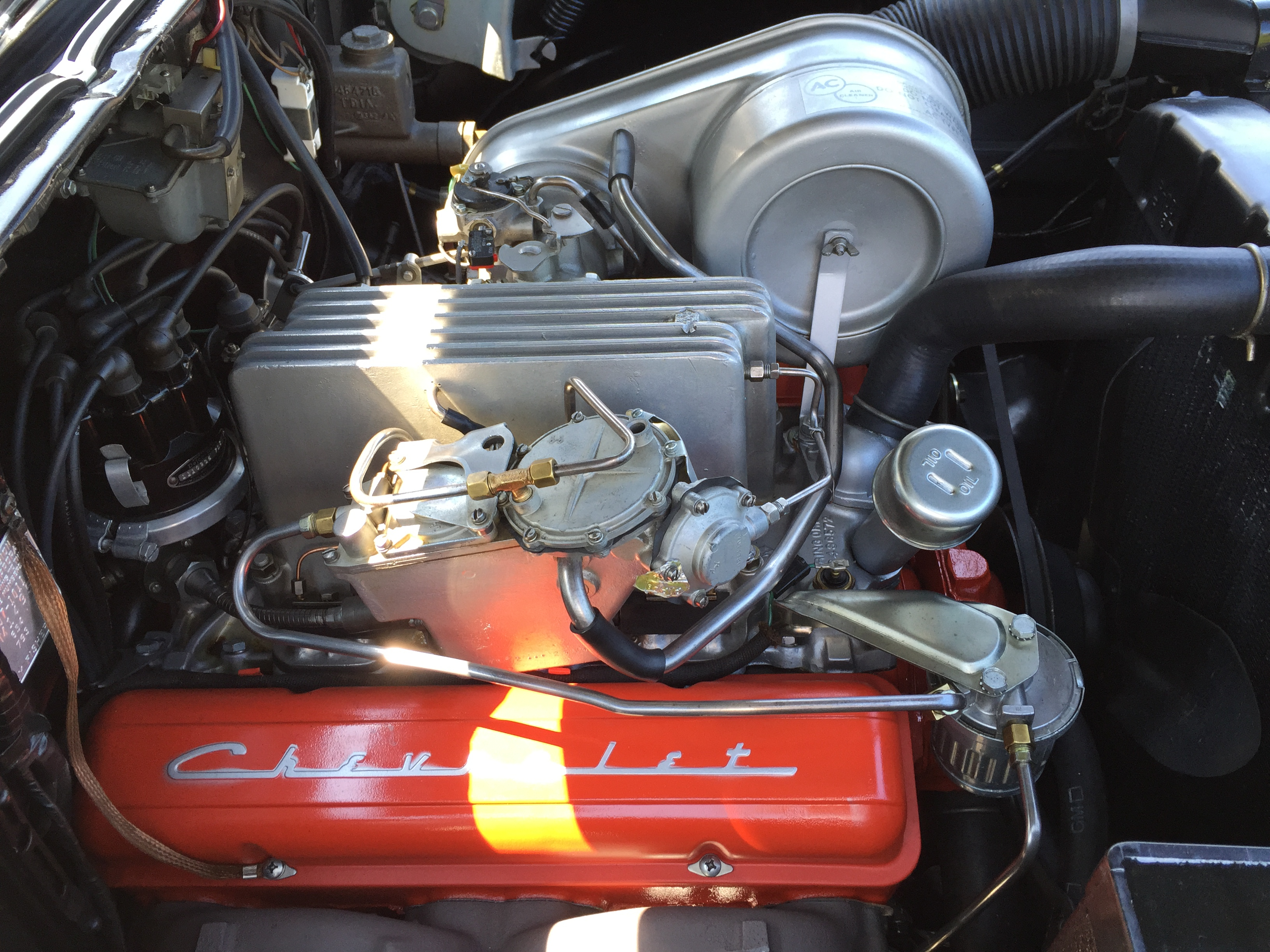
Rochester Ramjet system installed on a 1957 Chevrolet 210

The Rochester Ramjet is an automotive fuel injection system developed by the Rochester Products Division of General Motors and first offered as a high-performance option on the Corvette and GM passenger cars in 1957. It was discontinued partway through 1965 in favor of the Chevrolet Big Block as a performance option. Unlike electronic fuel injection systems that would become common decades later, the Ramjet is purely mechanical and relies on vacuum and pressure signals to measure airflow and meter fuel.

== History ==
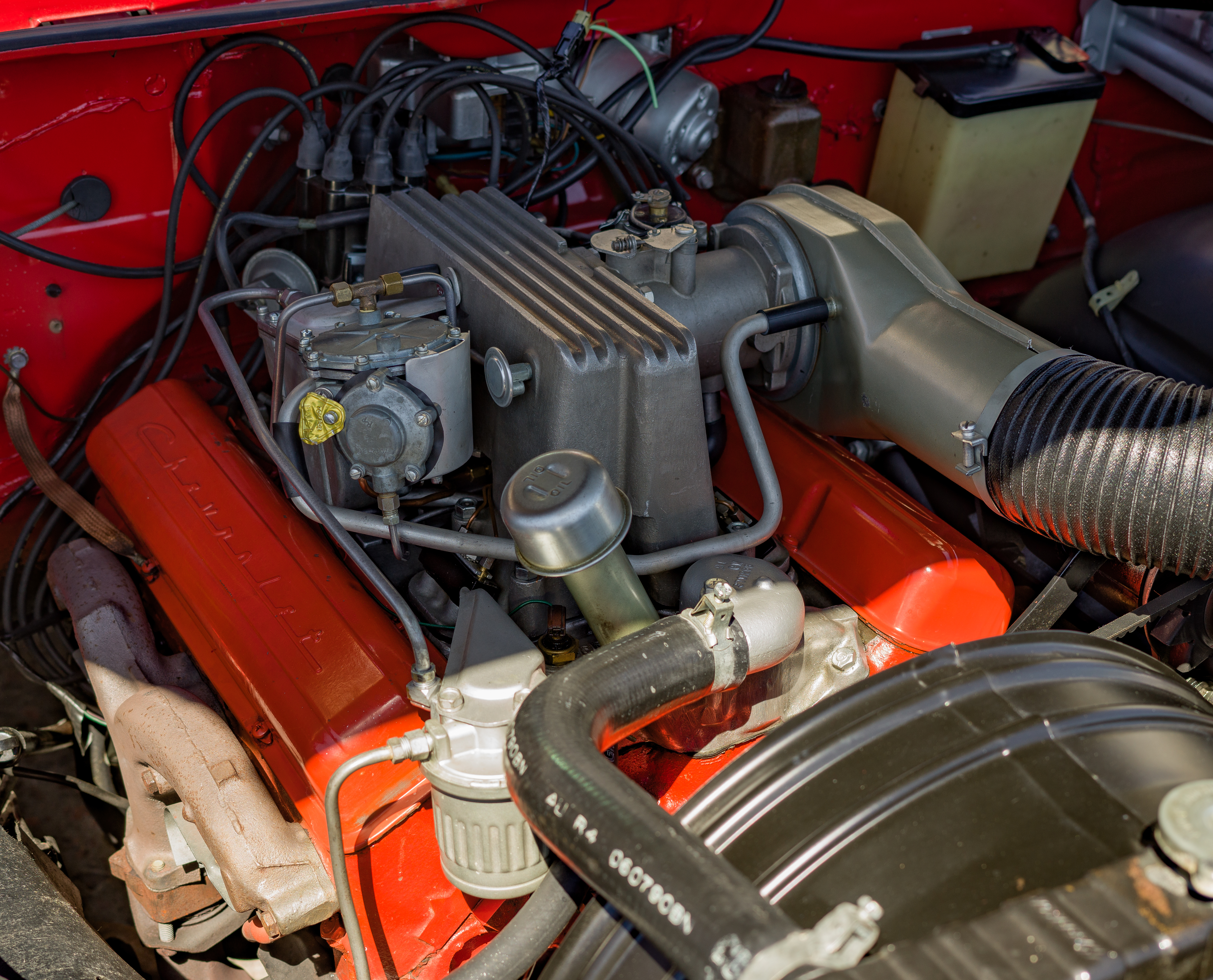
Rochester Ramjet as seen on 1959 Chevrolet passenger car

In the early 1950s, fuel injection was the topic of a significant amount of research by the auto industry in the US and internationally. Ed Cole, who had become the chief engineer of Chevrolet in 1952, pushed for Chevrolet to be the first GM brand to offer a fuel injection option on a production car. Much of the development of the Ramjet was done by engineer John Dolza, with supporting effort from Zora Arkus-Duntov. Dynamometer-based tests of a 265 cid small block engine running with fuel injection were performed as early as 1955.

Between 1957 and 1965, the Ramjet was offered as the top performance option on the Corvette. When it was first introduced, it passed the threshold of one horsepower per cubic inch of engine displacement, and this fact was used in marketing material. In addition to the Corvette, the system was offered on Chevrolet and Pontiac passenger cars; each of which used a slightly different configuration with respect to the air cleaner and other components. Within the Chevrolet brand in 1957, Ramjet was covered by RPO-578 on the passenger cars and RPO-579 on the Corvette.

Although offered on Corvettes until 1965, the Ramjet system was available on Chevy passenger cars from 1957 through 1959.

== Technical details ==
The Ramjet is a continuous-flow port-injection system. Unlike later fuel injection systems that used electronics, this one is based on purely mechanical principles. The two main sub-assemblies of the system are the air meter and the fuel meter. The air meter measures airflow into the engine and manages thermostatic warmup enrichment, fuel shutoff on overrun, and idle settings. These measurements are sent via pressure and vacuum signals to the fuel meter, which contains the high-pressure fuel pump and controls delivery of fuel to the injector nozzles.

There are three easily identifiable revisions of the Ramjet, each spanning three years of the system's nine year production life. The first of these (1957-1959) are identified by the "finned top" sand cast plenum, followed by the "flat top" plenum (1960-1962), and finally the die-cast plenum (1963-1965). All versions of the system required a special distributor that provided a cable drive to the high-pressure fuel pump.

=== Limitations and issues ===
Although the Ramjet system allowed a significant increase in engine performance, its innovative design had several inherent issues that affected reliability and tuning. On the early systems (1957 through 1961), one of these problems affected the cold-start fuel enrichment: it would tend to discretely toggle on or off, rather than using a gradual series of steps. Later systems used electric chokes or exhaust-heat chokes for cold enrichment, although these had issues of their own. Additionally, the vapor pressure of modern pump gasoline may not be appropriate to prevent percolation in the Ramjet fuel distribution spider.

The cranking signal valve was also the source of reliability issues. It was intended to pass a certain maximum vacuum signal that would be used for fueling during cranking (i.e. before engine start). The valve would sometimes fail in a partially open position and cause the fueling to run much richer than stoichiometric.
