= Motronic =

Series of engine control unit

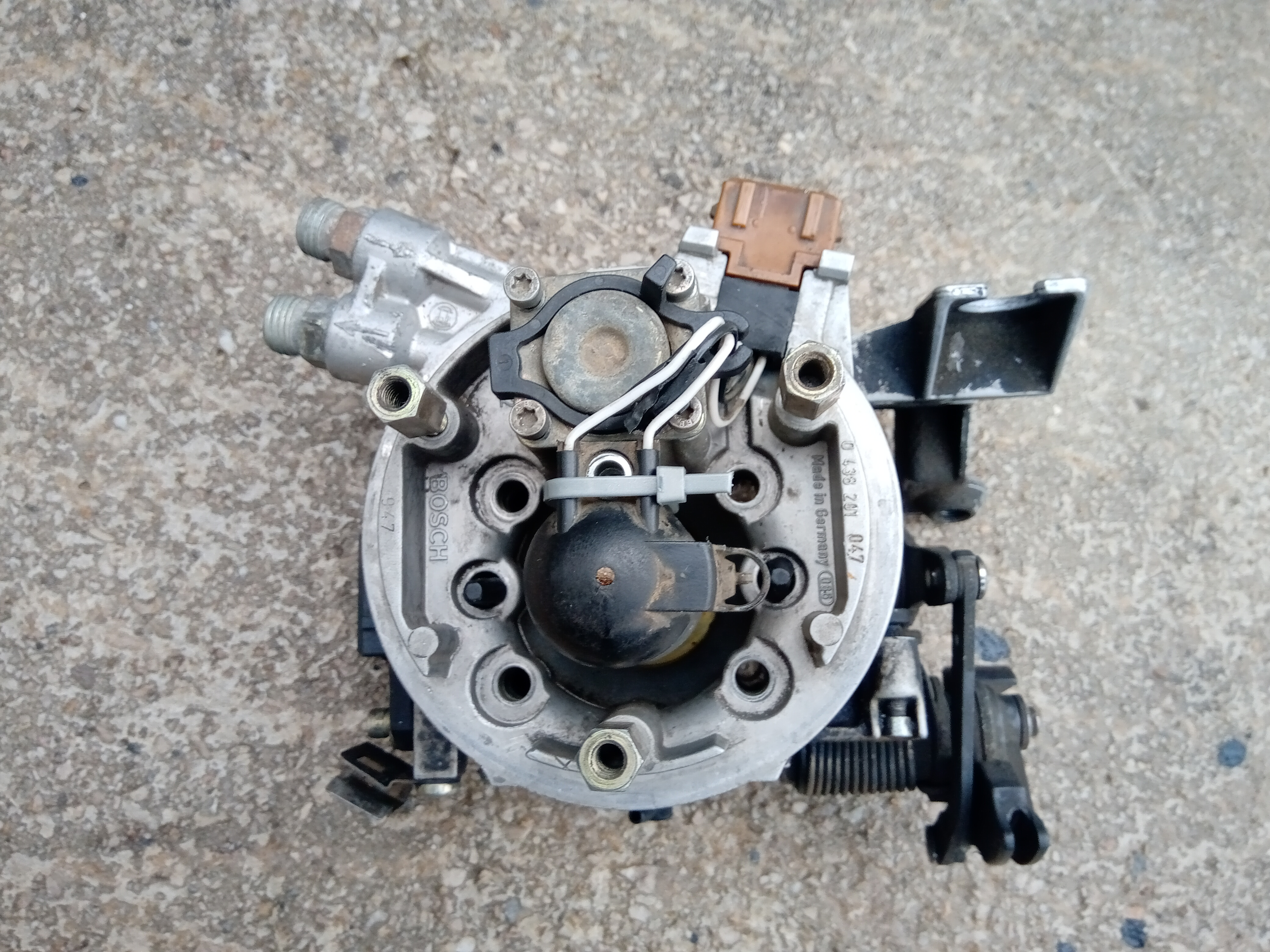
Bosch monopoint

Motronic is the trade name given to a range of digital engine control units developed by Robert Bosch GmbH (commonly known as Bosch) which combined control of fuel injection and ignition in a single unit. By controlling both major systems in a single unit, many aspects of the engine's characteristics (such as power, fuel economy, drivability, and emissions) can be improved.

== Motronic 1.x ==
Motronic M1.x is powered by various i8051 derivatives made by Siemens, usually SAB80C515 or SAB80C535. Code/data is stored in DIL or PLCC EPROM and ranges from 32k to 128k.

=== 1.0 ===
Often known as "Motronic basic", Motronic ML1.x was one of the first digital engine-management systems developed by Bosch. These early Motronic systems integrated the spark timing element with then-existing Jetronic fuel injection technology. It was originally developed and first used in the BMW 7 Series, before being implemented on several Volvo and Porsche engines throughout the 1980s.

The components of the Motronic ML1.x systems for the most part remained unchanged during production, although there are some differences in certain situations. The engine control module (ECM) receives information regarding engine speed, crankshaft angle, coolant temperature and throttle position. An air flow meter also measures the volume of air entering the induction system.

If the engine is naturally aspirated, an air temperature sensor is located in the air flow meter to work out the air mass. However, if the engine is turbocharged, an additional charge air temperature sensor is used to monitor the temperature of the inducted air after it has passed through the turbocharger and intercooler, in order to accurately and dynamically calculate the overall air mass.

Main system characteristics

- Fuel delivery, ignition timing, and dwell angle incorporated into the same control unit.
- Crank position and engine speed is determined by a pair of sensors reading from the flywheel.
- Separate constant idle speed system monitors and regulates base idle speed settings.
- An additional cold start injector is used to provide extra fuel enrichment when the engine's coolant temperature is below 35°C (in some configurations)
- Depending on application and version, an oxygen sensor may be fitted (the system was originally designed for leaded fuel).

=== 1.1 ===
Motronic 1.1 was used by BMW from 1987 on motors such as the M20. This version was also used by Volvo from 1982 to 1989 on the turbocharged B23ET, B230ET and B200ET engines.

The systems have the option for a lambda sensor, enabling their use with catalytic converter-equipped vehicles. This feedback system allows the system to analyse exhaust emissions so that fuel and spark can be continually optimised to minimise emissions. Also present is adaptive circuitry, which adjusts for changes in an engine's characteristics over time. Some PSA engines also include a knock sensor for ignition timing adjustment, perhaps this was achieved using an external Knock Control Regulator.

The Motronic units have 2 injection outputs, and the injectors are arranged in 2 "banks" which fire once every two engine revolutions. In an example 4-cylinder engine, one output controls the injectors for cylinders 1 and 3, and the other controls 2 and 4. The system uses a "cylinder ID" sensor mounted to the camshaft to detect which cylinders are approaching the top of their stroke, therefore which injector bank should be fired. During start-up (below 600 rpm), or if there is no signal from the cylinder ID sensor, all injectors are fired simultaneously once per engine revolution. In BMW vehicles, this Motronic version did not have a cylinder ID and as a result, both banks of injectors fired at once.

=== 1.2 ===
Motronic 1.2 is the same as 1.1, but uses a hot-film MAF in place of the flapper-door style AFM. This version was used by BMW on the S38B36 engine in the E34 M5 and on the M70B50 engine in the 750il from 1988 until 1990.

=== 1.3 ===
Motronic 1.1 was superseded in 1988 by the Motronic 1.3 system that was also used by PSA on some XU9J-series engines (which previously used Motronic 4.1). and by BMW.

The Motronic 1.1 and 1.3 systems are largely similar, the main improvement being the increased diagnostic capabilities of Motronic 1.3. The 1.3 ECM can store many more detailed fault codes than 1.1, and has a permanent 12-volt feed from the vehicle's battery which allows it to log intermittent faults in memory across several trips. Motronic 1.1 can only advise of a few currently-occurring faults.

=== 1.5 ===
This system was used on some of General Motors engines (C20NE, 20NE, C20SE, 20SE, 20SEH, 20SER, C20NEF, C20NEJ, C24NE, C26NE, C30LE, C30NE, C30SE, C30SEJ, C30XEI...). The system is very reliable and problems encountered are usually caused by poor contact at the associated plug/socket combinations that link the various system sensors to the Electronic Control Unit (ECU). Predecessor of the ME Motronic. Also used in the Opel engines C16SEI

=== 1.5.2 ===
Was used since 1991 in the Opel Astra F with C20NE engine. Major change was the use of a MAF instead of AFM in the Motronic 1.5.

=== 1.5.4 ===
Was used since 1994 in the Opel Omega B with X20SE engine. (Modified successor of C20NE engine) Major change to the Motronic 1.5.2 was the use of DIS ignition system, knock sensor and EGR valve. Was also used in the Opel engine X22XE.

=== M1.5.5 ===
Used in Fiat/Alfa/Lancia and Opel vehicles.

=== 1.7 ===
The key feature of Motronic 1.7 is the elimination of an ignition distributor, where instead each cylinder has its own electronically triggered ignition coil. Motronic 1.7 family has versions 1.7, 1.7.2, 1.7.3, all of them used on M42/M43 engines in BMW 3 Series (E36) up to 1998 and BMW 5 Series (E34) up to 1995. The BMW M70 12 cylinder had the Motronic M1.7 and two distributors.

=== 1.8 ===
This system was used by Volvo on the B6304 engine used in the Volvo 960.

== Motronic 2.x ==
Motronic M2.x is powered by various i8051 derivatives made by Siemens, usually SAB80C515 or SAB80C535.

=== 2.1 ===
The ML 2.1 system integrates an advanced engine management with 2 knock sensors, provision for adaptive fuel & timing adjustment, purge canister control, precision sequential fuel control and diagnostics (pre OBD-1). Fuel enrichment during cold-start is achieved by altering the timing of the main injectors based on engine temperature. The idle speed is also fully controlled by the digital Motronic unit, including fast-idle during warm-up. Updated variants ML 2.10.1 through 2.5 add MAF Mass Air Flow sensor logic and direct fire ignition coils per cylinder. Motronic 2.1 is used in the Porsche 4 cyl 16V 944S/S2/968 and the 6 cyl Boxer Carrera 964 & 993, Opel/Vauxhall, FIAT & Alfa Romeo engines.

=== 2.3/2.3.2 ===
The M2.3.2 system was made for Audi's turbo 20V 5-cylinder engines mainly, but a variant was also used on the Audi 32V 3.6L V8 and a few Audi 32V 4.2 V8 engines. The turbo 5 cylinder version was the first time knock and boost control had been introduced in one ECU, though the ECU was really two computers in one package. One side of the ECU controlled the timing and fueling while the other side controlled the boost and knock control. Each side has its own Siemens SAB80C535 processor and its own EPROM for storing operating data. What made this ECU special was the use of two crank sensors and one cam sensor. The ECU used one crank sensor to count the teeth on the starter ring for its RPM signal, and the other read a pin on the back of the flywheel for TDC reference. This ECU was first seen when the 20V turbo 5-cylinder engine (RR Code) was installed into the Audi Quattro. It was then used in the Audi 200 20V turbo until 1991 when the Audi S4 was introduced and the ECU received several upgrades, including migration from a distributor-based ignition to coil on plug sequential ignition and an added overboost function. This ECU ended in 1997 when the last Audi S6 rolled off the assembly line. This ECU was also used in the legendary Audi RS2 Avant.

The V8 version of the ECU was only single processor based while retaining all the same features of the turbo 5-cylinder ECU less the boost control. The 3.6 V8 version had a distributor-based ignition system and was upgraded around the same time to coil on plug as its 20V turbo counterpart in 1992–1993.

=== 2.5 ===
Was introduced in 1988 in the Opel Kadett E GSi 16V C20XE engine. Sequential fuel injection and knock control.

=== 2.7 ===
Late '80s and early '90s, various Ferrari. Some Opel / Vauxhall (C20LET engine).

=== 2.8 ===
Successor of the Motronic 2.5. Was used from 1992 at Opel C20XE engine. Major change was the introduction of DIS ignition. Was also at Opel V6 engine C25XE (1993, Opel Calibra (also X25XE), Opel Vectra A) used. Modified as M2.8.1 (1994) for X30XE and X25XE (Opel Omega B). M2.8.3 engine X25XE (Opel Vectra B) and X30XE (Opel Sintra).

== Motronic 3.x ==
Motronic M3.x is powered by i196 microcontroller with code in flash memory ranging from 128kB to 256kB.

=== 3.1 ===
Compared with ML1.3, this system adds knock sensor control, purge canister control and start-up diagnostics. Motronic 3.1 is used in non-VANOS BMW M50B25 engines.

=== 3.3 ===
Motronic 3.3 is used by BMW M60B30/B40 V8's in the 5, 7 & 8 series.

=== 3.3.1 ===
Motronic 3.3.1 is used in BMW M50B25 engines with VANOS.

=== 3.7 ===
Motronic 3.7 is used in the Alfa Romeo V6 engine in the later 12 valve 3.0L variants, replacing the L-Jetronic.

=== 3.7.1 ===
Motronic 3.7.1 is used in the Alfa Romeo V6 engine in the 24 valve variants.

=== 3.8.1, 3.8.2, 3.8.3, 3.8.4 ===
Motronic M3.8x is used in many Volkswagen/Audi/Skoda vehicles

== Motronic 4.X ==
Motronic M4.x is powered by various i8051 derivatives made by Siemens.

=== 40.0 ===
??

=== 40.1 ===
??

=== 4.1 ===
The Motronic ML4.1 system was used on Opel / Vauxhall eight-valve engines from 1987 to 1990, Alfa Romeo and some PSA Peugeot Citroën XU9J-series engines.

Fuel enrichment during cold-start is achieved by altering the timing of the main injectors based on engine temperature, no "cold start" injector is required. The idle speed is also fully controlled by the Motronic unit, including fast-idle during warm-up (therefore no thermo-time switch is required).

The ML4.1 system did not include provision for a knock sensor for timing adjustment. The ignition timing and fuel map could be altered to take account of fuels with different octane ratings by connecting a calibrated resistor (taking the form of an "octane coding plug" in the vehicle's wiring loom) to one of the ECU pins, the resistance depending on the octane adjustment required. With no resistor attached the system would default to 98 octane.

There is a single output for the injectors, resulting in all injectors firing simultaneously. The injectors are opened once for every revolution of the engine, injecting half the required fuel each time.

Motronic ML4.1 was used in the Opel engines: 20NE, 20SE, 20SEH, 20SER, C20NE, C30LE, C30NE.

=== 4.3 ===
The Motronic 4.3 was used by Volvo for their five-cylinder turbocharged 850 models from 1993 until 1996.

It was introduced with the launch of the 850 Turbo (also called the 850 T-5 and 850 T-5 Turbo) in October 1993 for model year 1994. Features included OBD I diagnostics, dual knock sensors and a lot more. For the 1996 model year OBD II diagnostics were introduced on some cars while M4.3 was beginning to be phased out. The last M4.3 equipped cars were made for model year 1997.

=== 4.4 ===
The Motronic 4.4 was used by Volvo from 1996 until 1998.

The M4.4 was based on its predecessor and featured only a small number of improvements. Memory capacity was doubled and a few new functions were introduced such as immobilizer compatibility. OBD II was standard on all cars fitted with this system albeit the necessary protocols were not integrated for all markets. The system was used for the five- and six-cylinder modular engined cars and was used on turbocharged and naturally aspirated models. Introduced in 1996 for 1997 model year it was first installed on some of the last 850 models like the 2.5 20V and AWD. A coil on plug variant existed for the six cylinder Volvo 960/S90/V90. After the 850 was replaced by the Volvo V70, Volvo S70 and Volvo C70 the system was used until the end of model year 1998.

=== 4.6 ===
The Motronic 4.6 was used in Nissan Micra K11 from 2000 until 2003.

== Motronic 5.X ==
=== 5.2 ===
Motronic 5.2 was used in the BMW M44B19 engine. Compared to 1.7, Motronic 5.2 has OBD-II capability and uses a hot-wire MAF sensor in place of the flapper-door AFM.

=== 5.2.1 ===
Motronic 5.2.1 was used in Land Rover Discovery Series II and P38 Range Rovers that were built starting with late 1999. It was only used in cars equipped with V8 gasoline engines. This variant of the engine management system was adapted for off-road use. Unlike the Motronic system in BMW sedans, that uses a chassis accelerometer to differentiate between misfires and rough road, the Land Rover version used signal from ABS control unit to detect rough road conditions. This version of the system was integrated with body control module and anti-theft system.

== Short list of ML-Motronic ==
ML-Motronic appears in 1979. BMW equipped the E32 732i with the Bosch ML-Motronic. This was a L-Jetronic (now in digital technology) with digital ignition control in the same housing. Data was stored in EPROM. ML-Motronic and M-Motronic must be keep apart. There is ML3.2 and M3.2, these a two different things.

ML 1	ML 1.1	ML 1.2	ML 1.3	ML 2	ML 2.1	ML 2.2
ML 3.1	ML 3.2	ML 3.3	ML 4.1	ML 5.1	ML 5.2	ML 5.3
ML 5.4	ML 5.5	ML 5.6	ML 5.7	ML 5.9	ML 6.1	ML 6.1.4

== Short list of M-Motronic ==
While the ML-Motronic is continuing and new ML-Motronic versions appear, Bosch launched the M-Motronic. There were many versions. While older versions were improved and further developed, new M-Motronic versions appear. So it makes no sense, to identify newer/older versions within the first counting numbers after the “M”. For example:

- M1.5, introduced by Opel in 1988
- M1.5.2, 1991
- M1.5.4, 1994
- M1.5.5, 1997

The M2.3 und M2.3.2 (used by Audi/VW) appears long before 1997. So the M1.5.5 is much more developed than the M2.3.2.

ML-Motronic and M-Motronic must be keep apart. There is ML3.2 and M3.2, these are two different things.

M 1.1
M 1.11	M 1.11.1				
M 1.2
M 1.3	M 1.3.1				
M 1.5	M 1.5.1	M 1.5.1R	M 1.5.2	M 1.5.4	M 1.5.5
M 1.7	M 1.7.2	M 1.7.3			
M 1.8
M 1.9	M 1.9.1	M 1.9.2	M 1.9.4	M 1.9.5	
M 2.1
M 2.10.1	M 2.10.2	M 2.10.3	M 2.10.4		
M 2.2					
M 2.3	M 2.3.2				
M 2.4	M 2.4.1				
M 2.5
M 2.7
M 2.8	M 2.8.1	M 2.8.3			
M 2.9	M 2.9.1				
M 3.2	M 3.2.1				
M 3.3
M 3.4	M 3.4.1	M 3.4.2	M 3.4.3	M 3.4.4	
M 4.1
M 4.2
M 4.3
M 4.4.1	M 4.4.2				
M 4.6	M 4.6.1	M 4.6.2			
M 5.2.1	M 5.2.2				
M 5.4	M 5.4.1				
M 5.9	M 5.9.2				
M 7.4.4
M 7.5
M 7.9.1	M 7.9.2	M 7.9.4	M 7.9.41		
M 7.9.5	M 7.9.52	M 7.9.71	M 7.9.8	M 7.9.81	
M 9.2

== MP MA ME MED Motronic ==
- MP-Motronic - load is calculated by manifold pressure
- MA-Motronic - load is calculated by angle of the throttle body
- ME-Motronic - drive by wire is integrated in the Motronic System
- MED-Motronic - direct fuel injection is integrated in the Motronic System

== See also ==
- Digifant Engine Management system
- Jetronic
