= Plymouth Fury =

Line of Plymouth automobiles produced by Chrysler

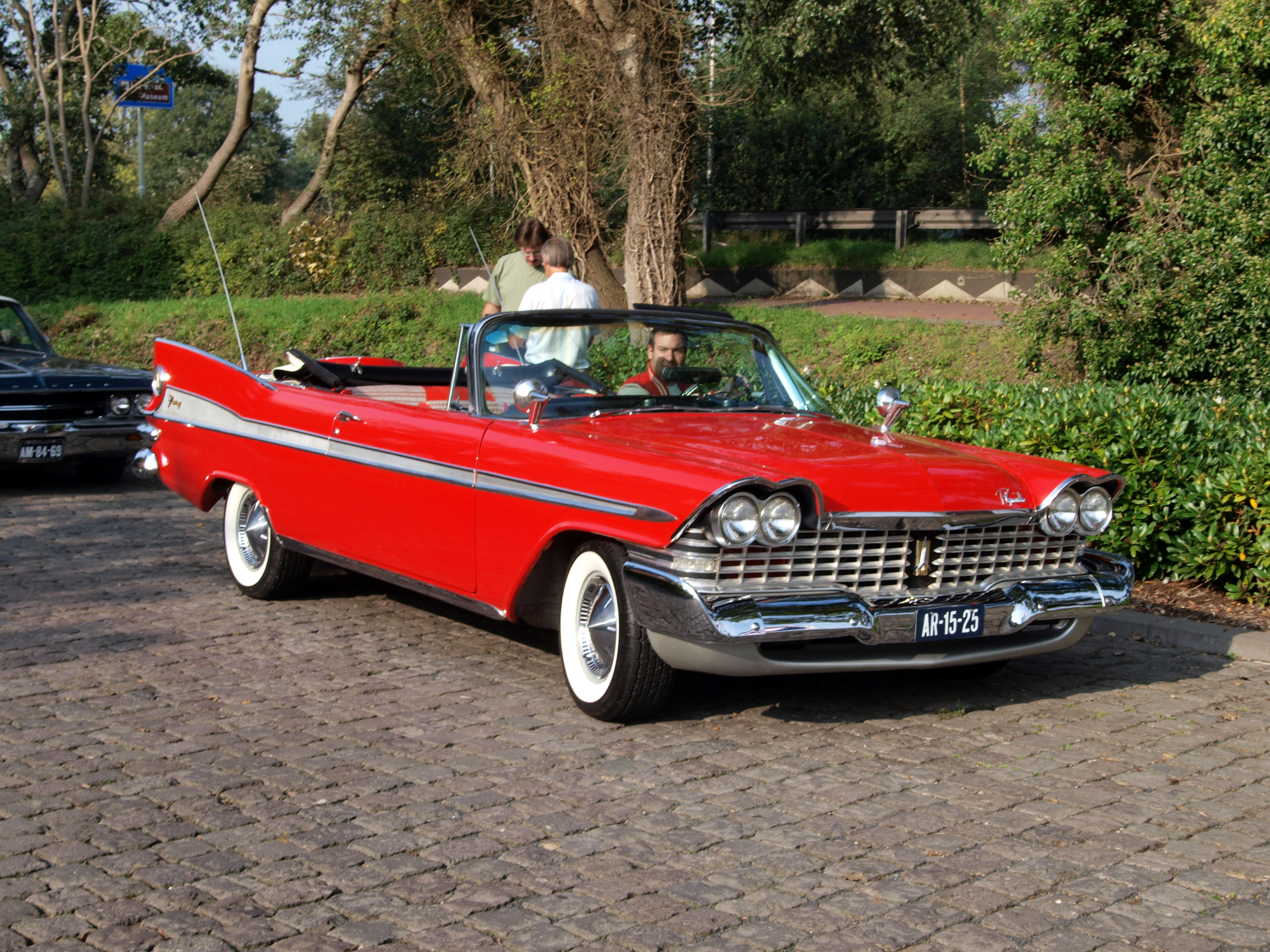
- 1959 Plymouth Sport Fury

Overview
- Manufacturer: Plymouth (Chrysler)
- Also called: Plymouth Sport Fury (1959, 1962–1971); Plymouth VIP (1966–1969)
- Production: 1958–1978
- Model years: 1959–1978
- Assembly: Lynch Road Assembly in Detroit, Michigan (1955–1980); Saint Louis Assembly in Fenton, Missouri (1984–1986); AMC's Kenosha Main (later Kenosha Engine) in Kenosha, WI (1987–1989); Windsor Assembly in Windsor, Ontario, Canada (1959–1978, 1982–1983)

Body and chassis
- Class: Full-size (1959–1961); Mid-size (1962–1964); Full-size (1965–1974); Mid-size (1975–1978); Full-size (1980–1981); Mid-size (1982–1989)
- Layout: FR layout

Chronology
- Predecessor: Plymouth Belvedere; Plymouth Plaza; Plymouth Savoy
- Successor: Plymouth Gran Fury (full-size for 1975 through 1977, and 1980 though 1989); Plymouth Caravelle (Canada)

The Plymouth Fury is a model of automobile marketed under the Plymouth brand by Chrysler Corporation from 1955 until 1989.

Introduced for the 1956 model year as a sub-series of the Plymouth Belvedere, the Fury became a separate series one level above the contemporary Belvedere for 1959. The Fury was a full-size car from 1959 until 1961, then a mid-size car from 1962 until 1964, again a full-size car from 1965 through 1974, and again, a mid-size car from 1975 through 1978.

From 1975 until 1977, the Fury was sold alongside the full-size Plymouth Gran Fury. In 1978, the B-body Fury was the largest Plymouth, and by 1979, there was no large Plymouth. This product gap was filled in 1980 with the R-body Gran Fury, followed by the M-body Fury in 1982.

Production of the last V8-powered rear-wheel-drive Plymouth Fury ended at American Motors' Kenosha Main assembly plant in Kenosha, WI, on December 23, 1988.

== Early history (1956–1958) ==
The Fury was a sub-series of the Plymouth Belvedere from 1956 through 1958. It was available in 1956 and 1957 as a two-door hardtop finished in Sandstone White with gold anodized aluminum trim. In 1958, it was only available in Buckskin Beige with gold anodized aluminum trim. These Furys had unique interiors, bumper wing-guards, and V8 engines with twin four-barrel carburetors. The 1957 and 1958 model-year 290 hp (216 kW), 318 cu in (5.2 L) engine was shared with the Dodge Coronet.

The 1957 models were restyled: longer and wider, with very large vertical tailfins and a new torsion-bar front suspension replacing the previous coil springs. While the new styling boosted sales, quality control suffered across all Chrysler products as they were brought to market quickly before their design and construction weaknesses could be fully addressed by engineering. The front suspension introduced Chrysler's Torsion-Aire Torsion bar suspension, shared with all Chrysler products starting in 1957.

In 1958, the optional engine was a "big block" 350 cu in (5.7 L) called the "Golden Commando" with two four-barrel carburetors producing 305 hp (227 kW). A 315 hp (235 kW) option with fuel injection was available. However, the Bendix electronic fuel-injection system was recalled by the factory, and owners were given a conventional dual four-barrel setup. The Golden Commando engine was optional on any Plymouth Plaza, Savoy, Belvedere, Suburban, and Fury. The dual four-barrel 318 cu in (5.2 L) (dubbed the "V-800 Dual Fury"; four- and two-barrel versions were introduced for 1958, and were called "V-800s").

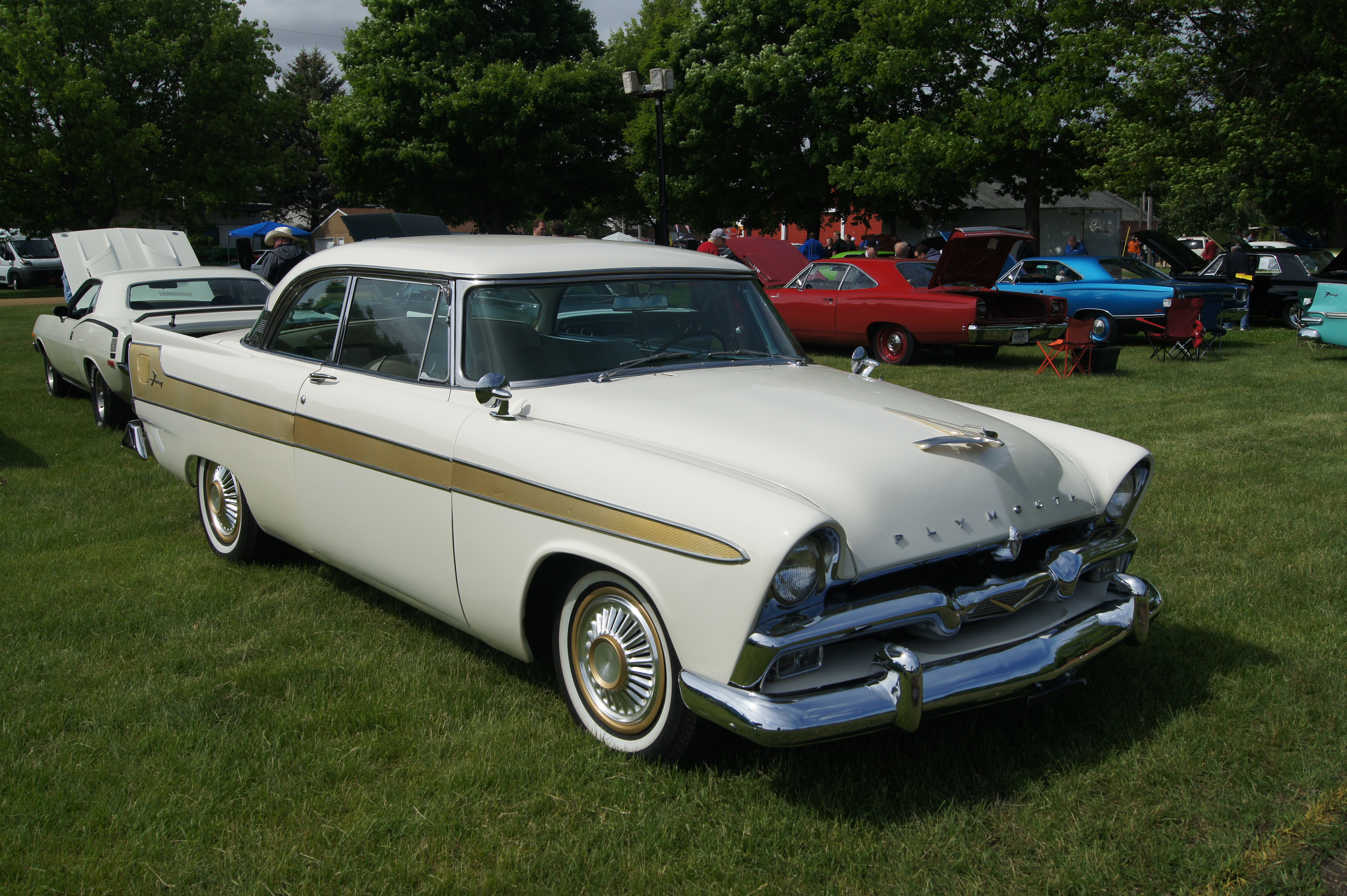
1956 Plymouth Fury

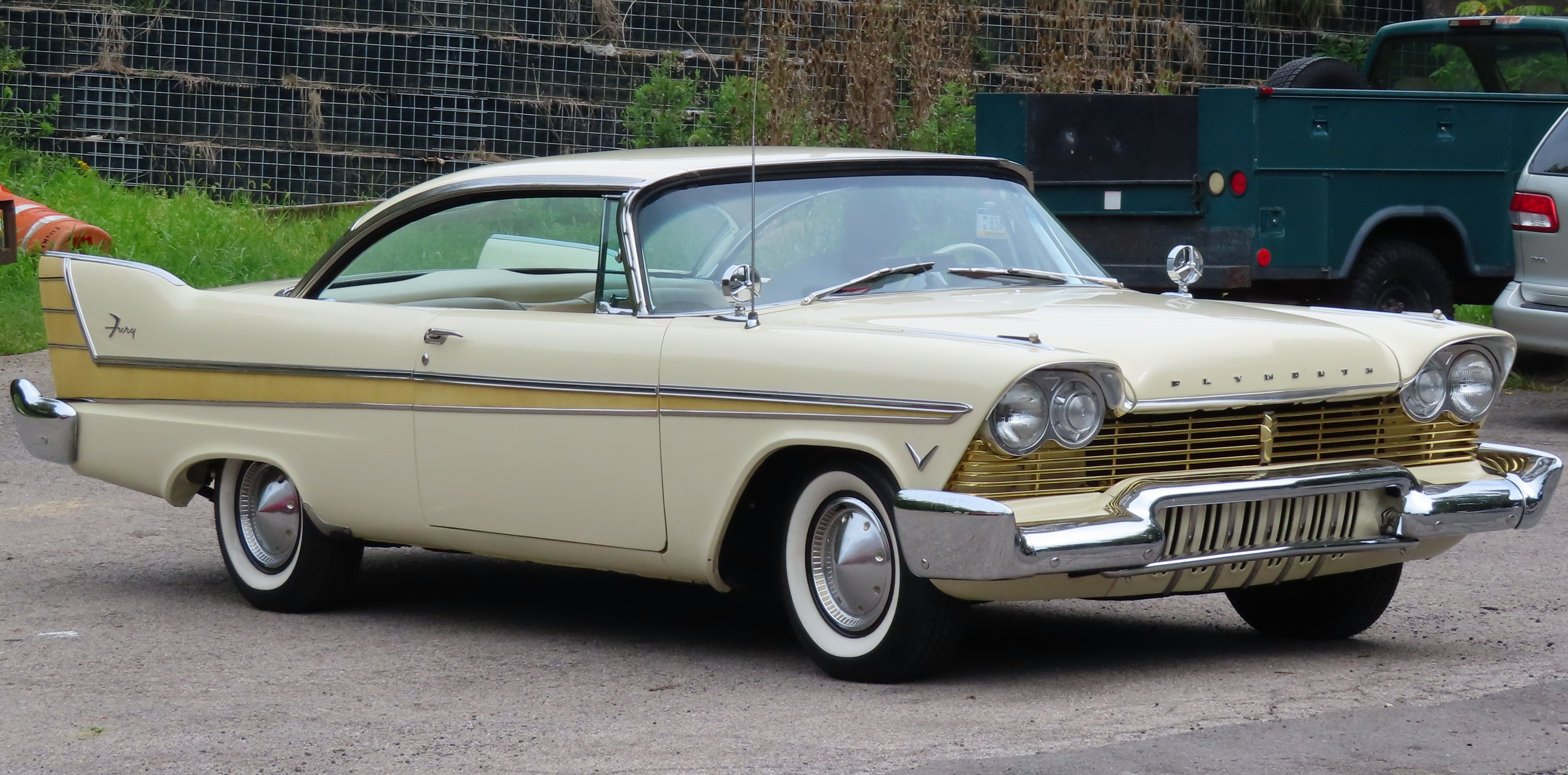
1957 Plymouth Fury

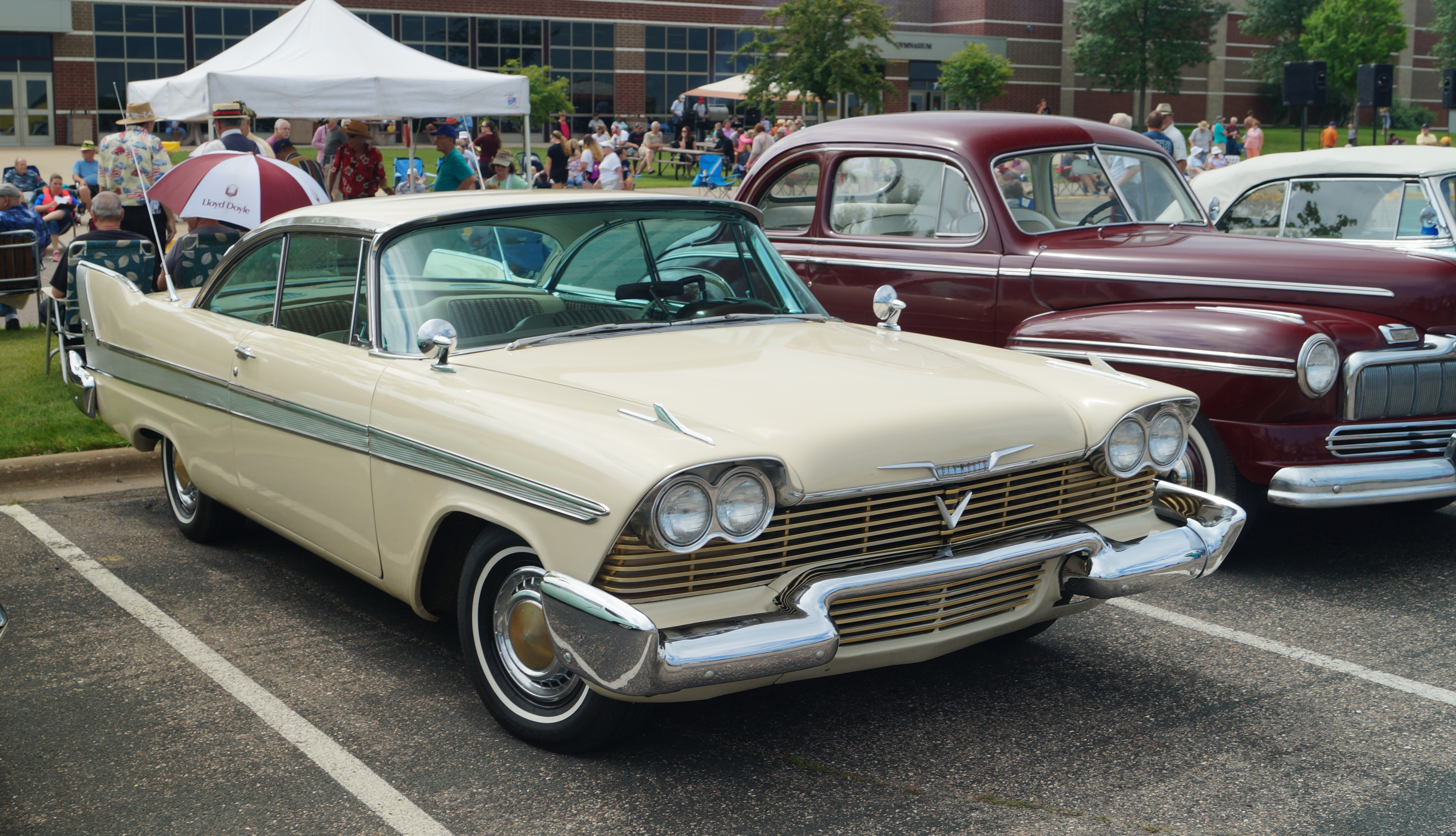
1958 Plymouth Fury

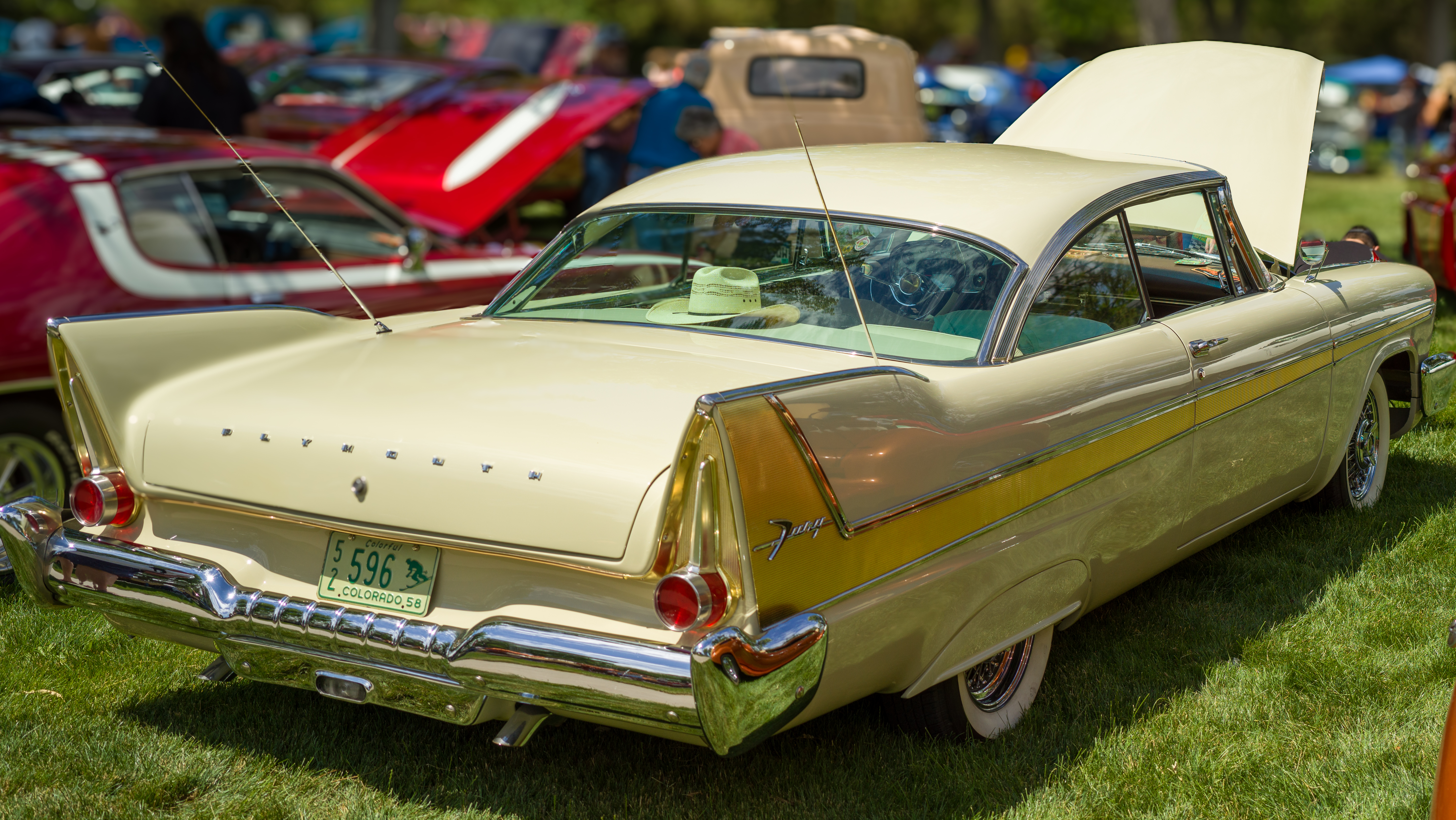
1958 Plymouth Fury Golden Commando

== First generation (1959) ==
First generation
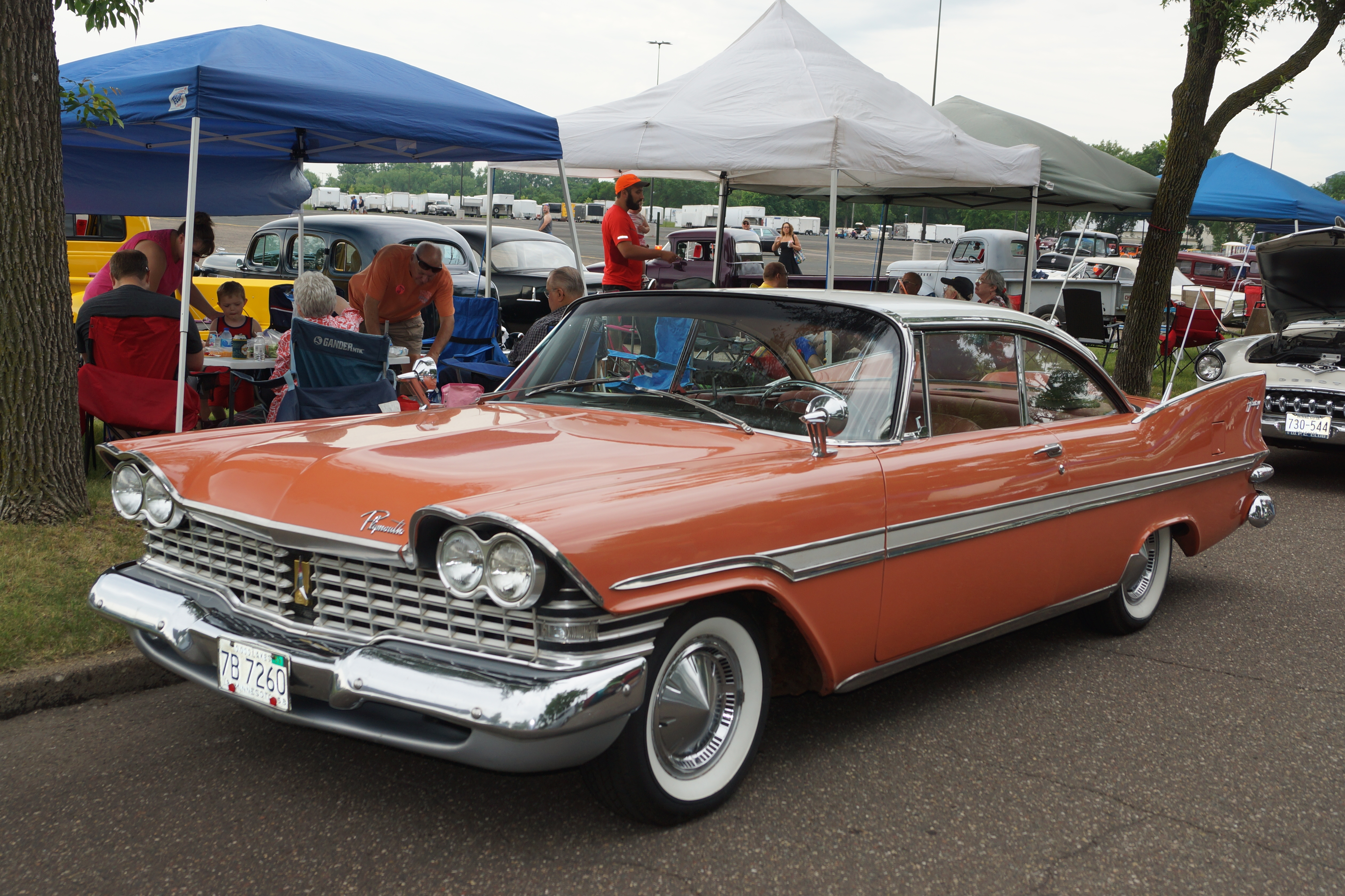
- 1959 Plymouth Fury 2-door hardtop

Overview
- Also called: Plymouth Sport Fury
- Model years: 1959 (Fury and Sport Fury)

Body and chassis
- Body style: 4-door sedan 4-door hardtop 2-door hardtop 2-door convertible
- Related: Sport Suburban (4-door wagon)

Powertrain
- Engine: 303 cu in (5.0 L) "A" block V8; 318 cu in (5.2 L) "A" block 4-bbl V8; 350 cu in (5.7 L) "B" block V8; 361 cu in (5.9 L) "B" block V8

Dimensions
- Wheelbase: 118 in (2997 mm)

In 1959, Plymouth introduced the Sport Fury as its top model, and the Fury as its second from the top model to replace the Plymouth Belvedere at the top of the Plymouth line-up. The Fury was available in four-door sedan, two-door and four-door hardtop body styles and the Sport Fury model as a two-door hardtop and convertible. The station wagon version of the Fury was designated as "Sport Suburban" and not marketed as a Fury. The Sport Fury model was discontinued at the end of 1959, reintroduced in mid-1962, and discontinued in 1971.

In 1959, the 350 cu in (5.7 L) was replaced with a 361 cu in (5.9 L) version of the Golden Commando with a two- or four-barrel carburetor. The dual four-barrel version of the "small block" 318 cu in (5.2 L) was also introduced that year, with the four-barrel available on this engine through the 1962 model year.

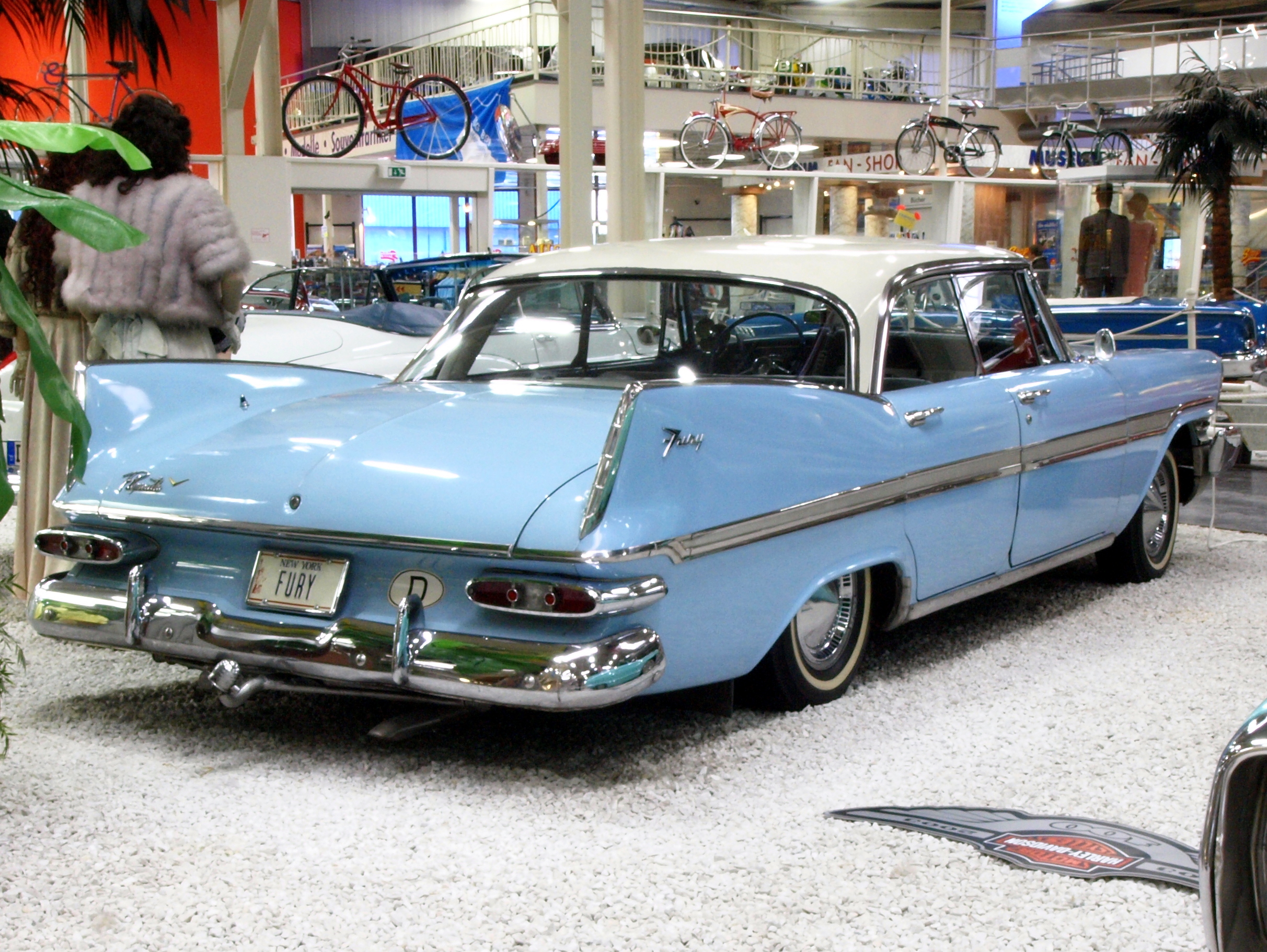
1959 Plymouth Fury 4-door Hardtop

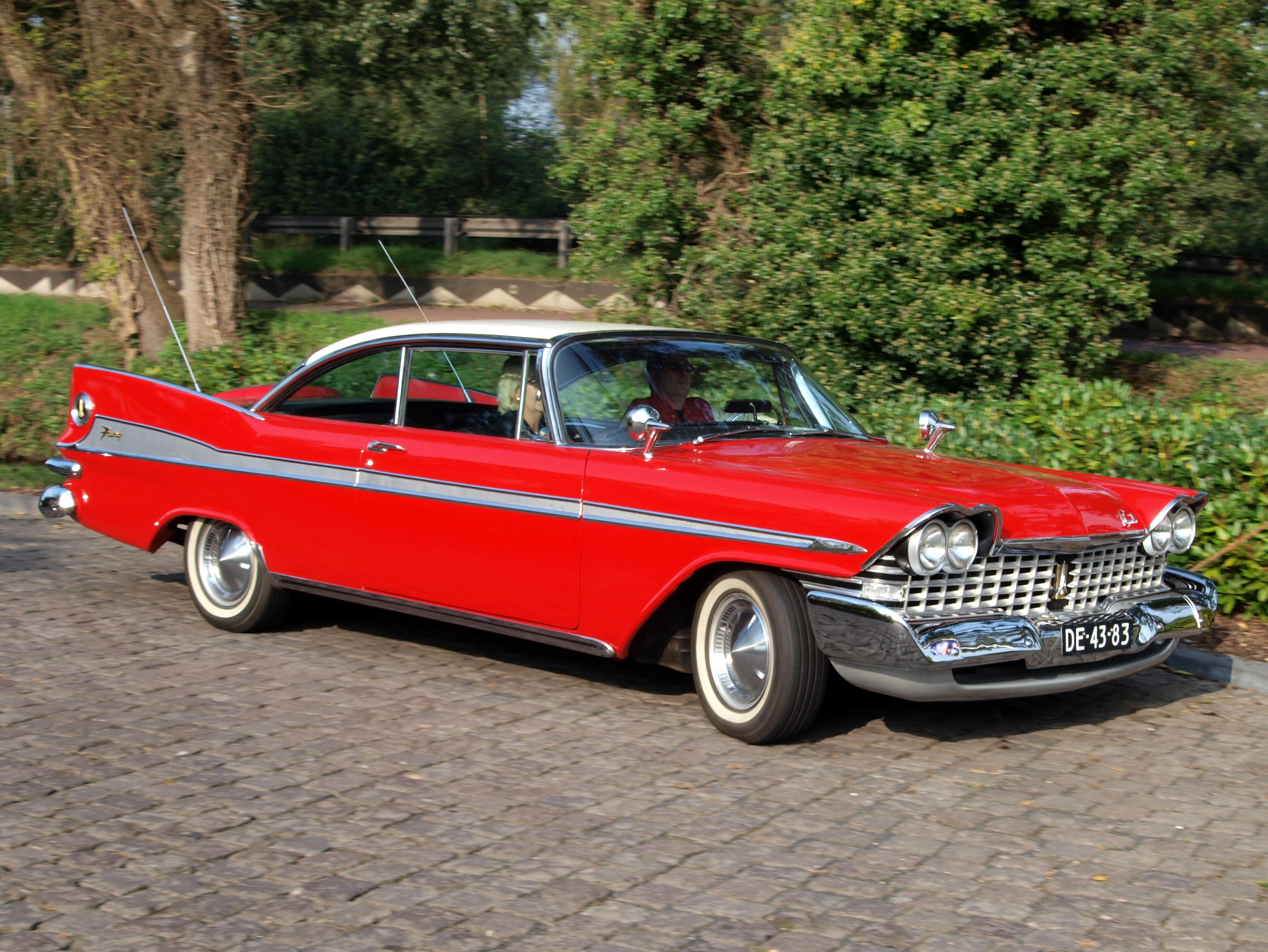
1959 Plymouth Sport Fury convertible

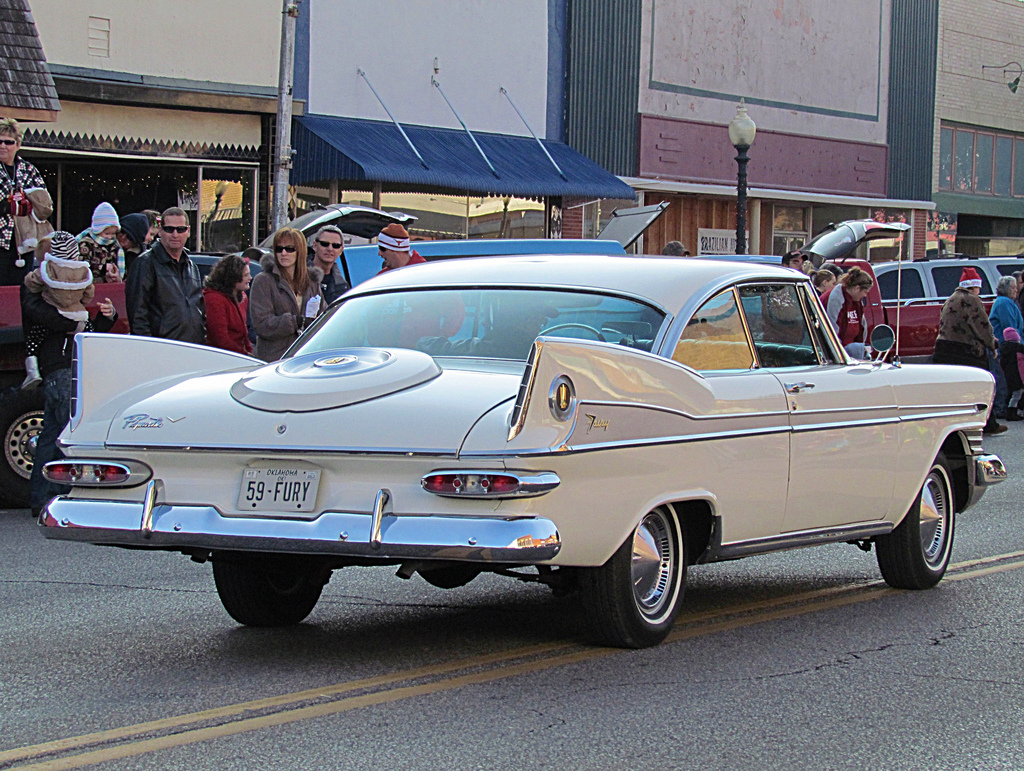
1959 Plymouth Sport Fury 2-door hardtop rear view

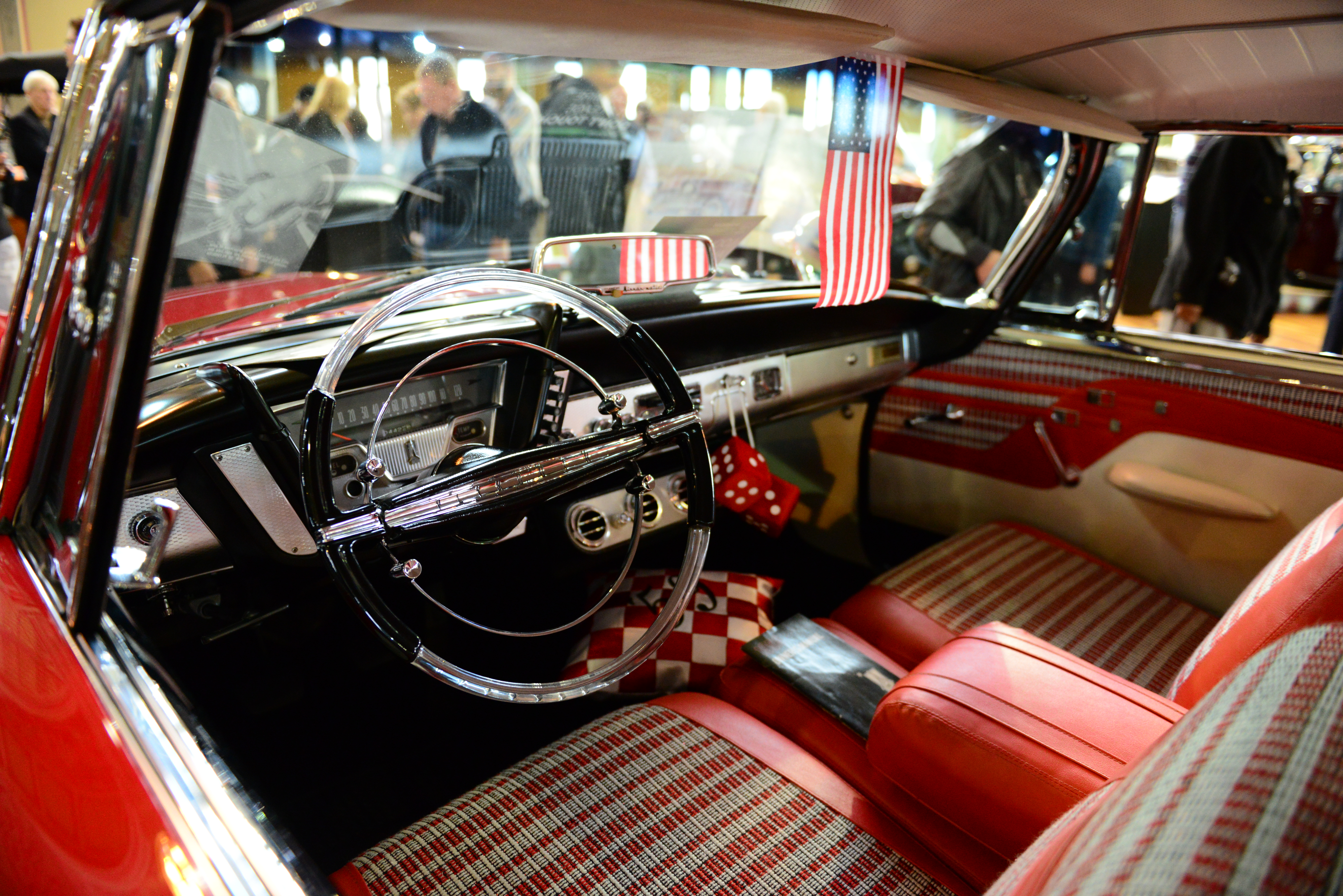
1959 Plymouth Fury interior

=== Dodge Viscount ===
The Dodge Viscount was an automobile built by Chrysler Canada for the 1959 model year only. It was based on the contemporary Plymouth Fury, but featured a 1959 Dodge front clip assembled to the Plymouth Fury body. However, there was no sport model counterpart to the Sport Fury sold in the U.S.

== Second generation (1960–1961) ==
Second generation
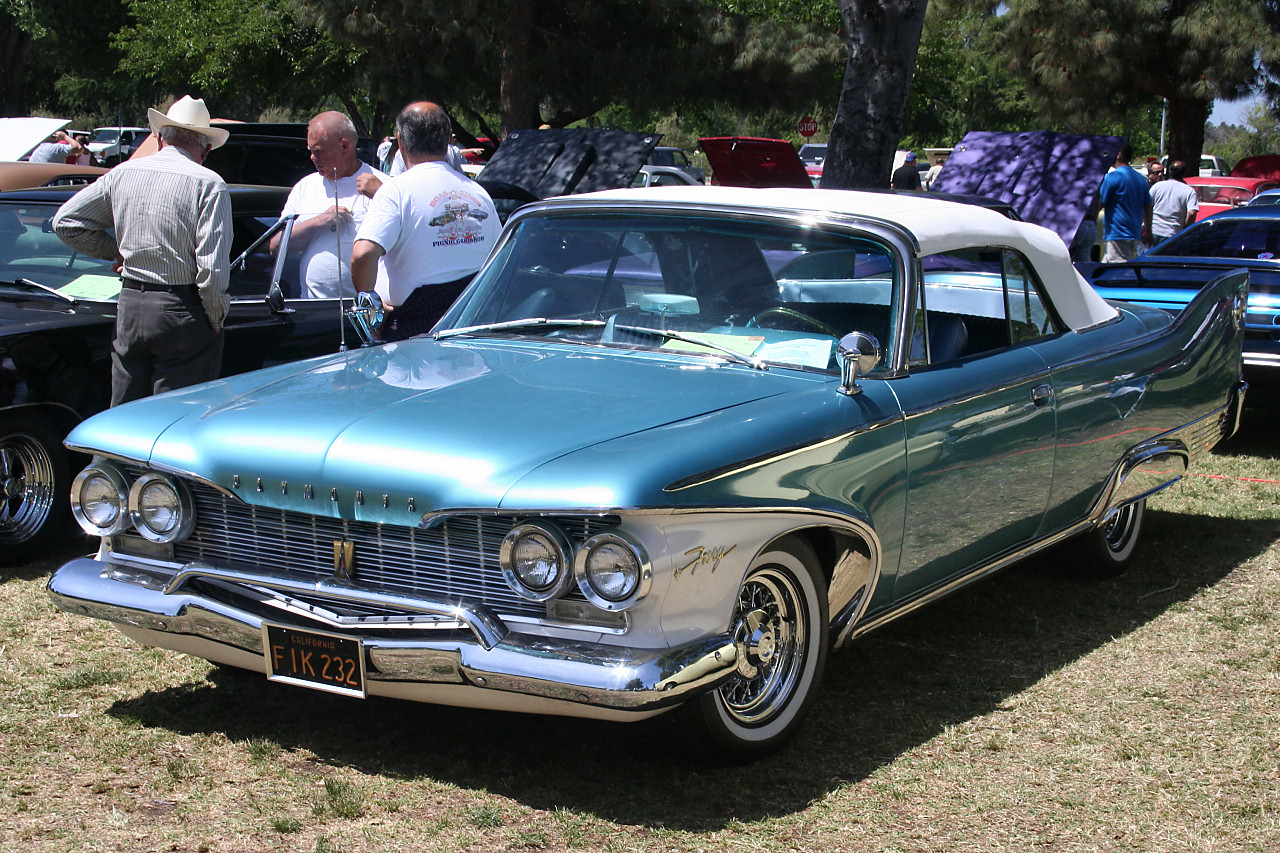
- 1960 Plymouth Fury convertible

Overview
- Model years: 1960–1961

Body and chassis
- Body style: 4-door sedan; 4-door hardtop; 2-door hardtop; 2-door convertible
- Related: Sport Suburban (4-door wagon)

Powertrain
- Engine: 225 cu in (3.69 L) slant-6 "30-D economy six" 1-bbl; 318 cu in (5.21 L) "A" V8 2 & 4-bbl; 361 cu in (5.92 L) "B" V8 2 & 4-bbl; 383 cu in (6.28 L) "B" V8 2 & 4-bbl; 383 cu in (6.28 L) "B" V8 2×4-bbl; 413 cu in (6.77 L) "RB" V8
- Transmission: 2-speed PowerFlite automatic; 3-speed TorqueFlite automatic; 3-speed TorqueFlite-6 automatic; 3-speed "Synchro-Silent" manual; 3-speed manual

Dimensions
- Wheelbase: 118 in (2,997 mm)
- Length: 209.5 in (5,321 mm)
- Width: 80 in (2,032 mm)
- Height: 54.6 in (1,387 mm)

The 1960 models were the first year for unibody construction, the first year for Chrysler's ram induction system, and the first year for Chrysler's new slant-six engine. The original 318 and 383 were available, along with a 361. The 225 cu in (3.69 L) slant-six produced 145 hp (108 kW) at 4,000 rpm. The 383 was rated at 330 hp (250 kW).

The styling for the 1960 model year had been formulated in 1957 during the height of tailfin era, but the design fell from fashion. While Chevrolet and Ford sales increased during 1960, Plymouth barely continued its 1959 volume.

Tailfins were removed for the 1961 model year.

The Fury remained Plymouth's leading sales volume model through the early 1960s.

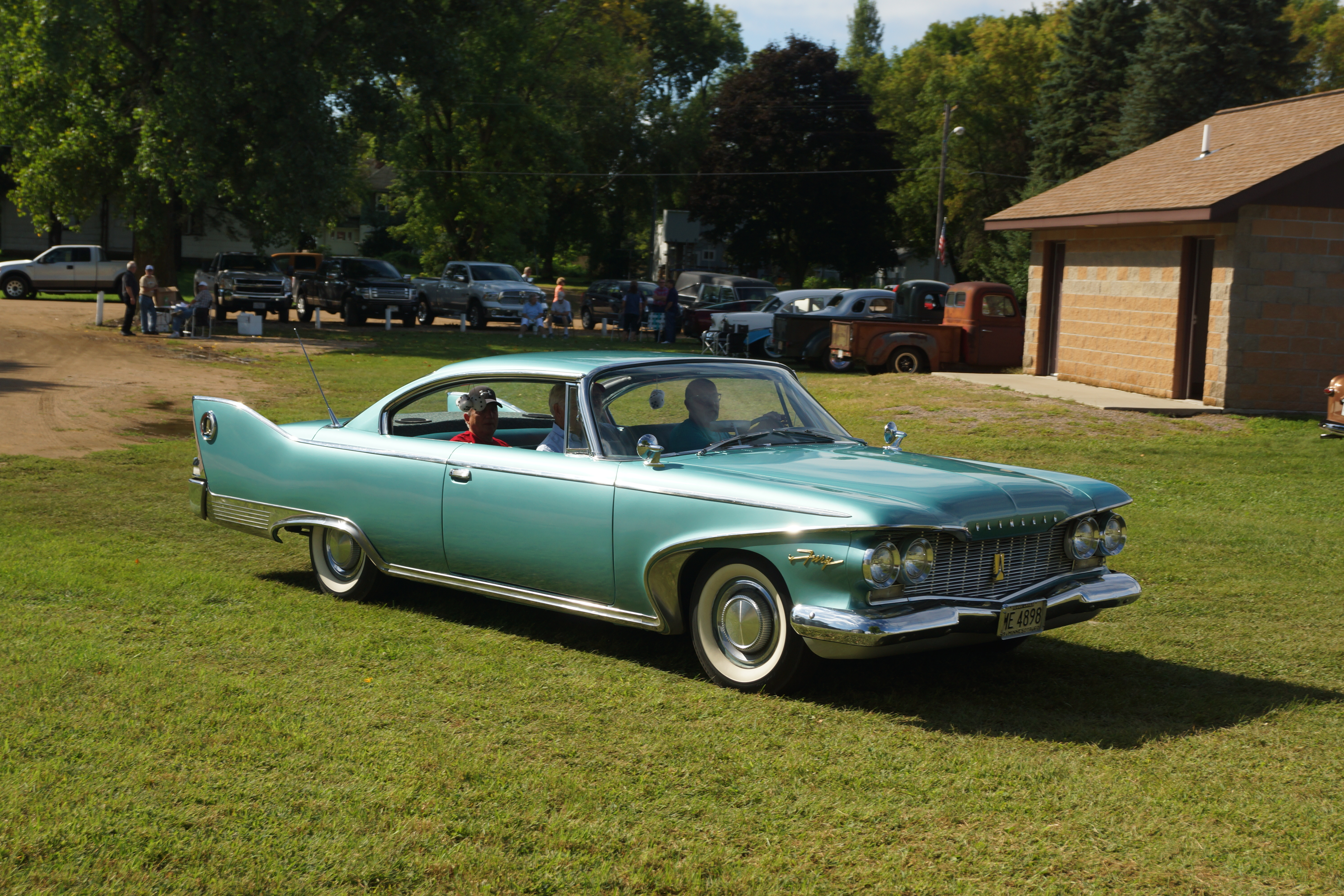
1960 Plymouth Fury 2-door Hardtop

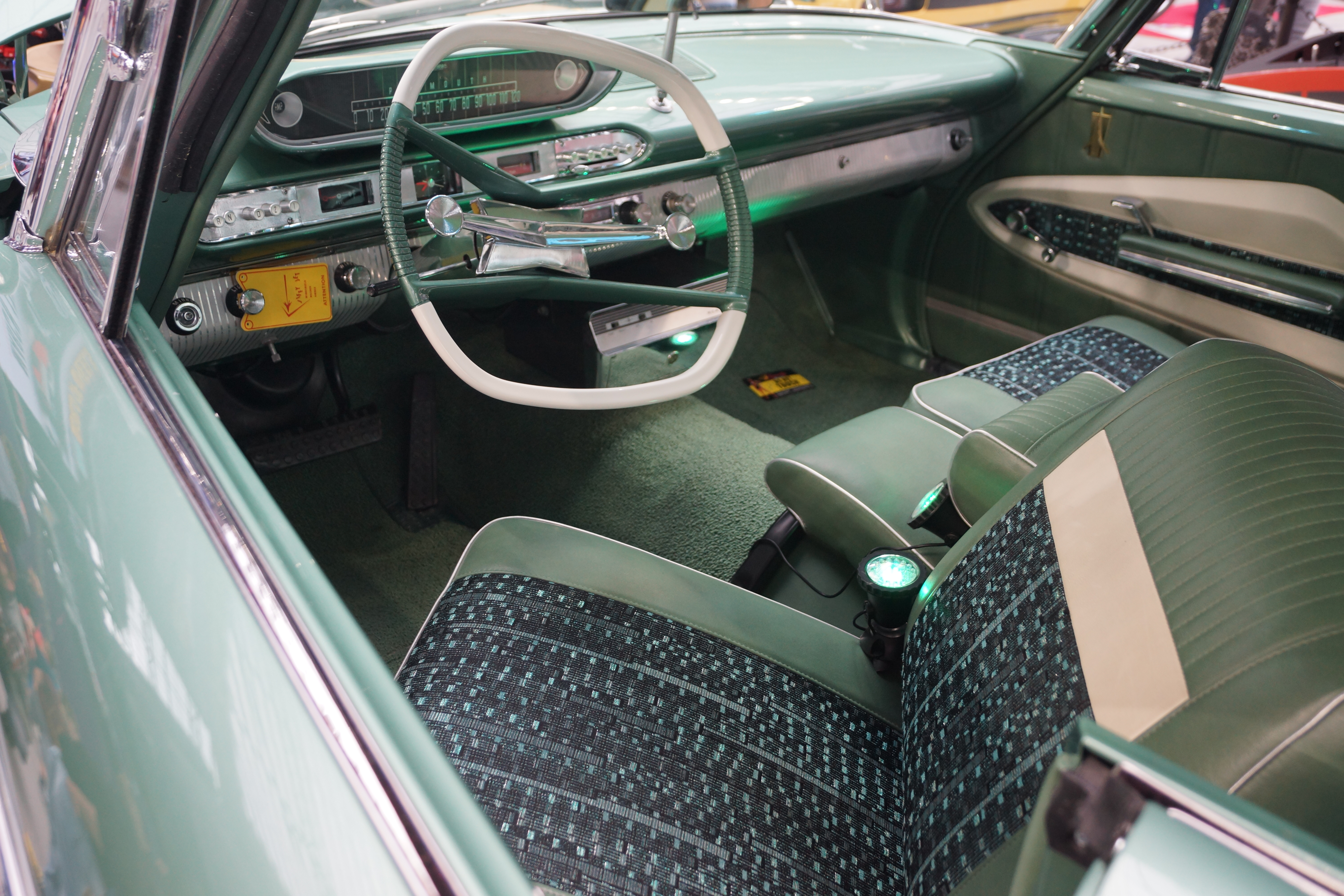
1960 Plymouth Fury interior

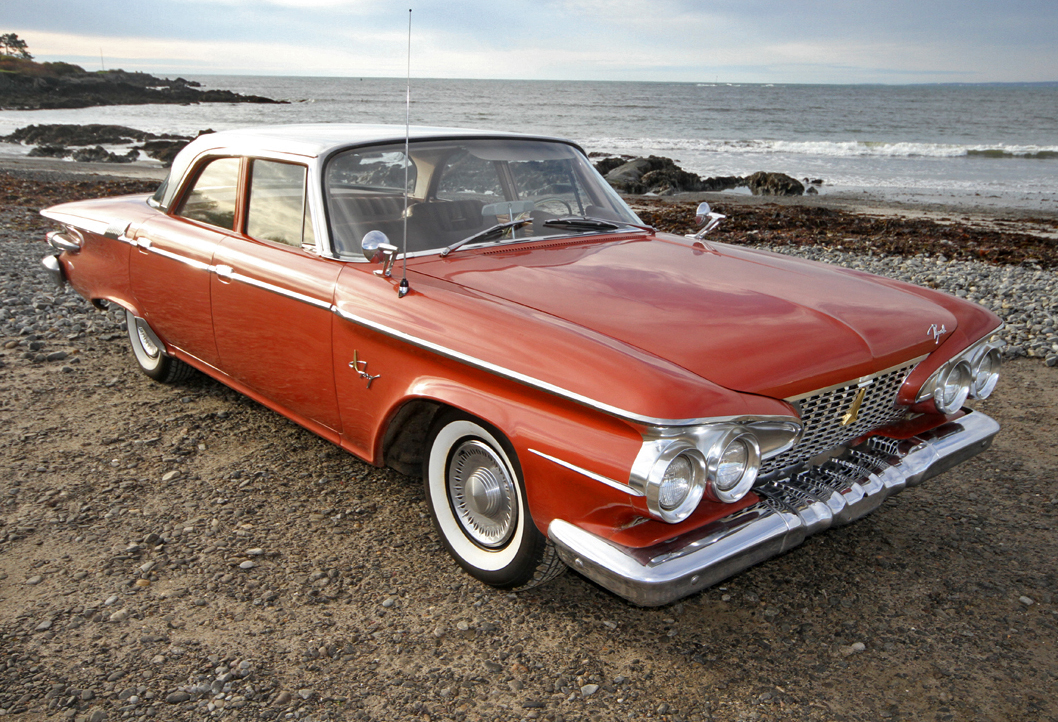
1961 Plymouth Fury four-door sedan

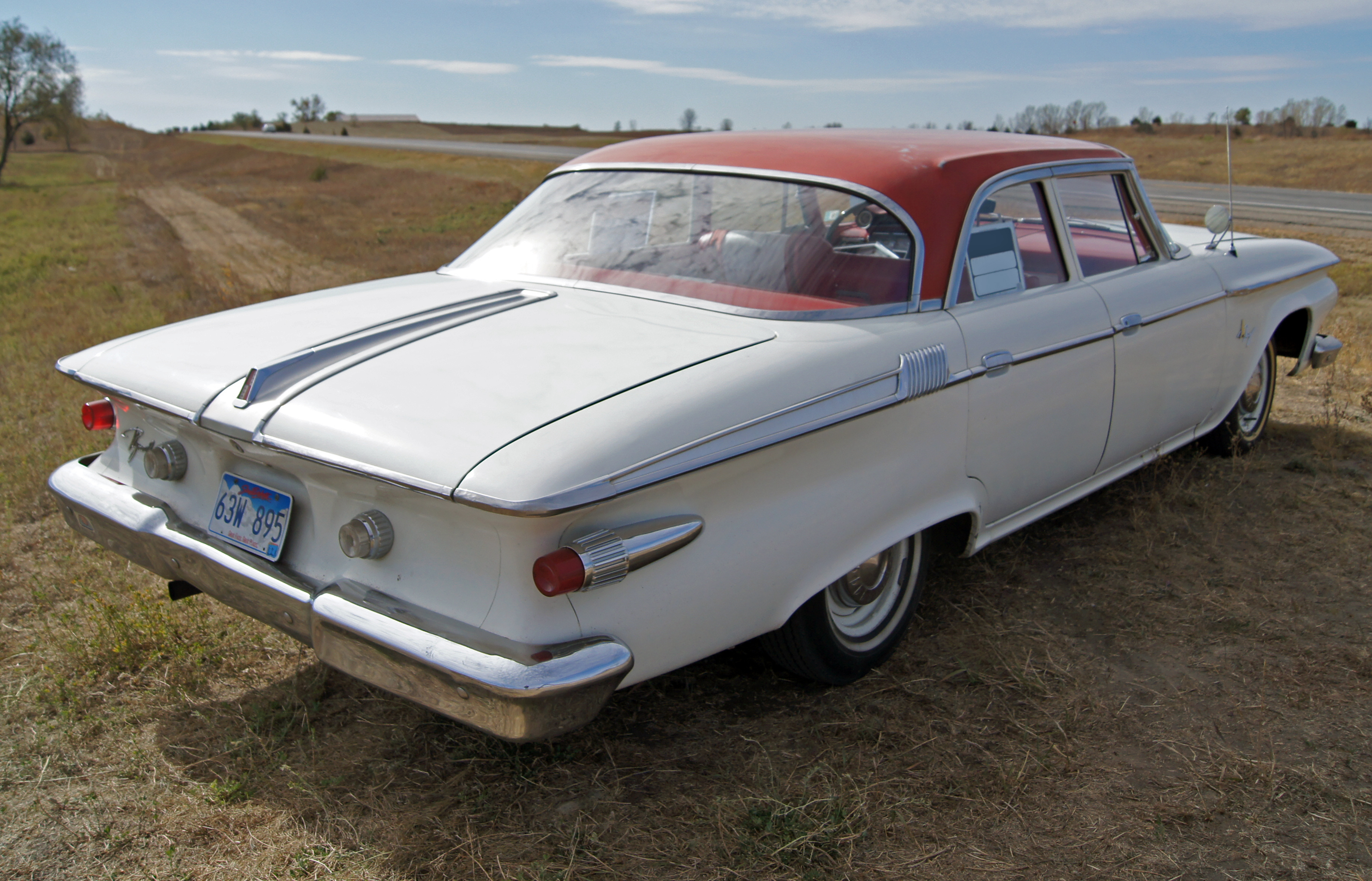
1961 Plymouth Fury four-door sedan

== Third generation (1962–1964) ==
Third generation
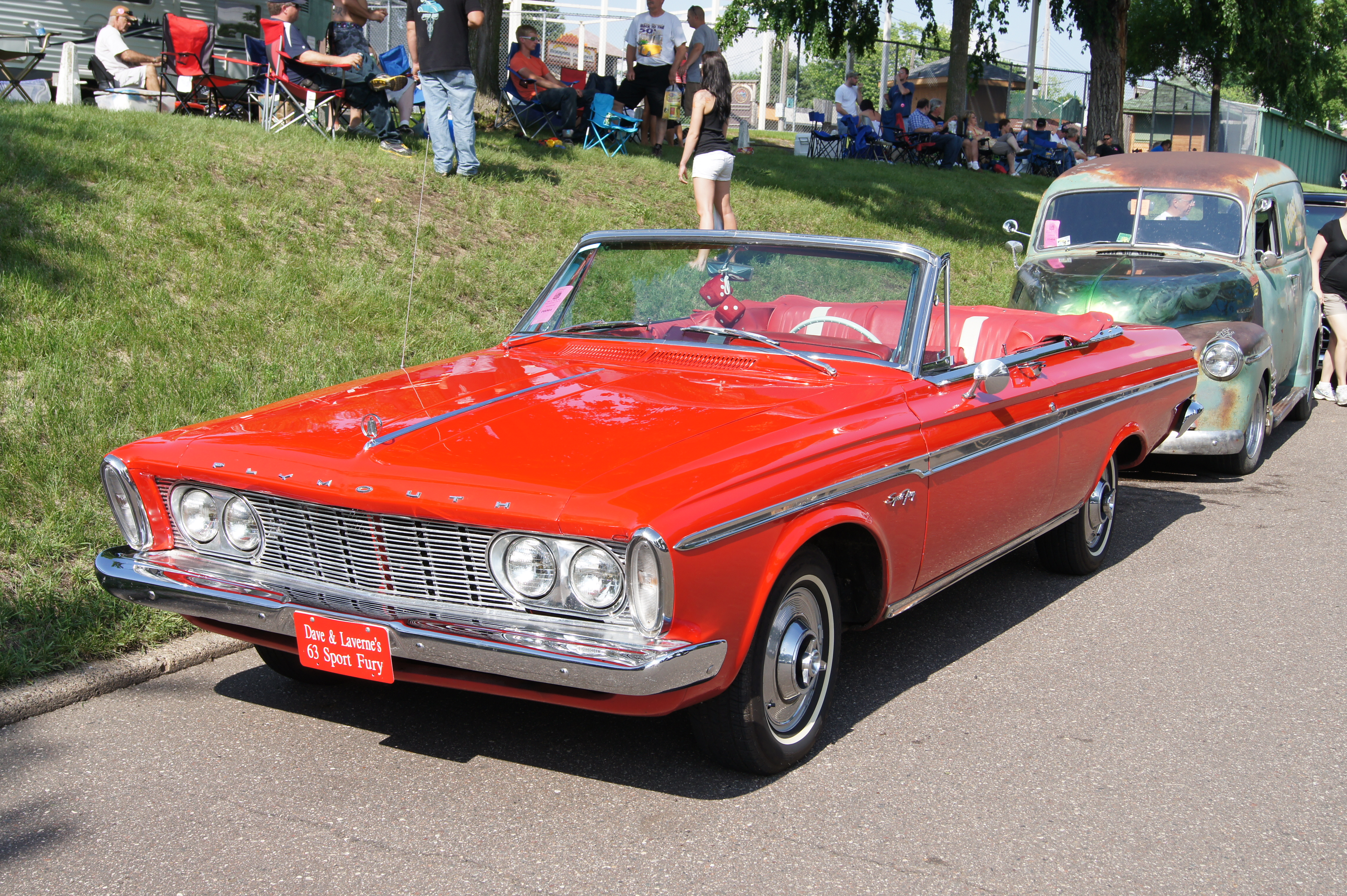
- 1963 Plymouth Sport Fury Convertible

Overview
- Also called: Plymouth Sport Fury
- Model years: 1962–1964 (Fury and Sport Fury)

Body and chassis
- Body style: 4-door wagon 4-door sedan 4-door hardtop 2-door hardtop 2-door convertible
- Platform: B-body
- Related: Dodge Coronet

Powertrain
- Engine: 225 cu in (3.69 L) Slant-6 "30-D Economy Six" 1-bbl 318 cu in (5.21 L) "A" V8; 361 cu in (5.92 L) "B" V8; 383 cu in (6.28 L) "B" V8; 413 cu in (6.77 L) "RB" V8; 426 cu in (6.98 L) Wedge and Hemi "B" V8
- Transmission: 3-speed TorqueFlite automatic 3-speed manual

The 1962 Fury emerged as a downsized model riding on the new Chrysler B-body unibody platform, the product of a Chrysler Corporation embroiled in multiple corporate controversies at the time. Sales of the new model were slow, prompting the reintroduction of the Sport Fury trim package, offered as a hardtop coupe or a convertible. The 1962 range included a Fury 4-door Station Wagon, the wagon equivalent of the Fury having previously been marketed as the Plymouth Sport Suburban.

Chrysler Corporation began to restyle and enlarge the Plymouths and Dodges, which improved sales in 1963 and 1964. The 1964 models saw an improvement in sales, especially the two-door hardtop, which featured a new slanted roofline. Engine choices remained the same throughout this three-year cycle.

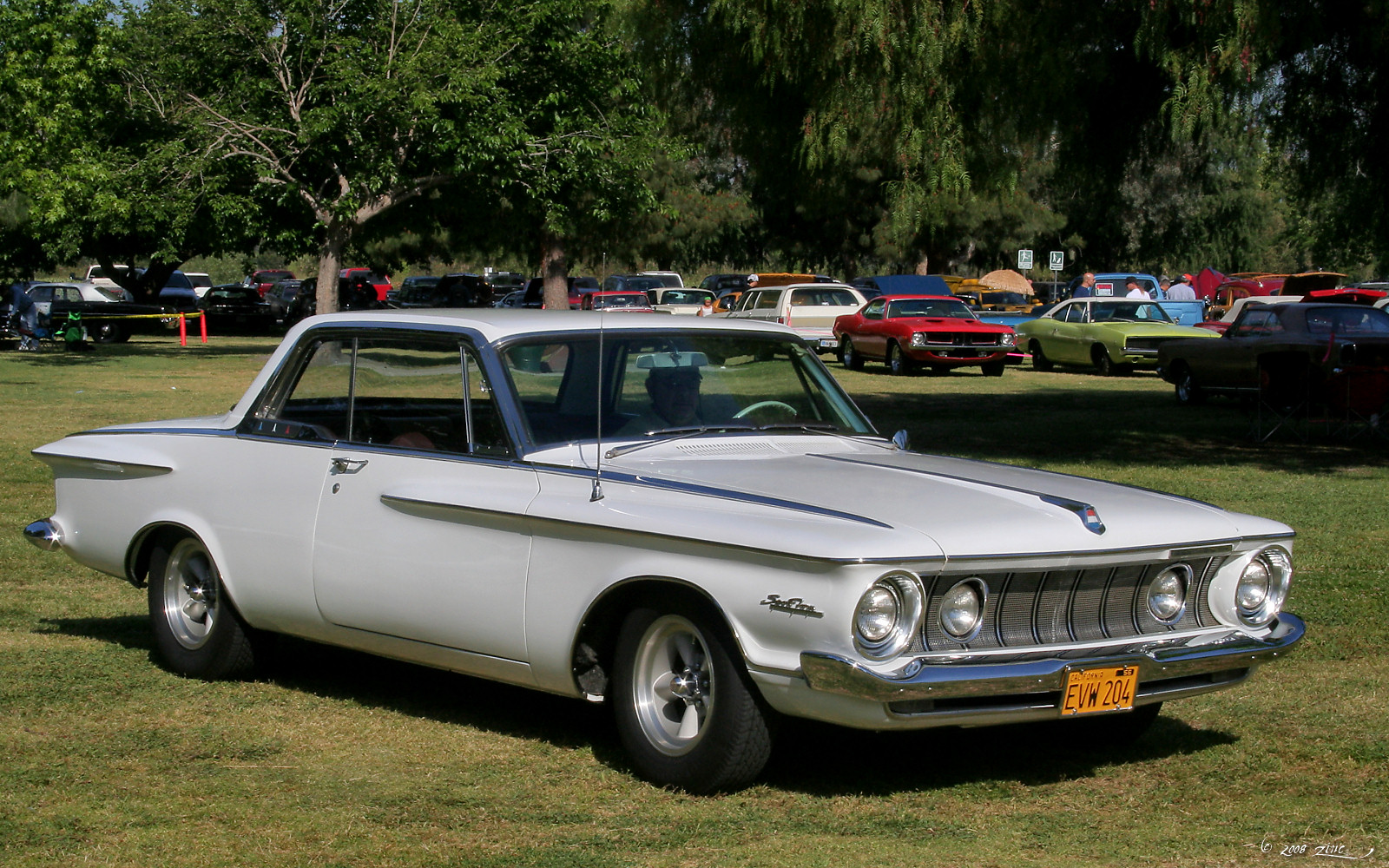
1962 Plymouth Sport Fury 2-Door Hardtop (with after-market wheels)

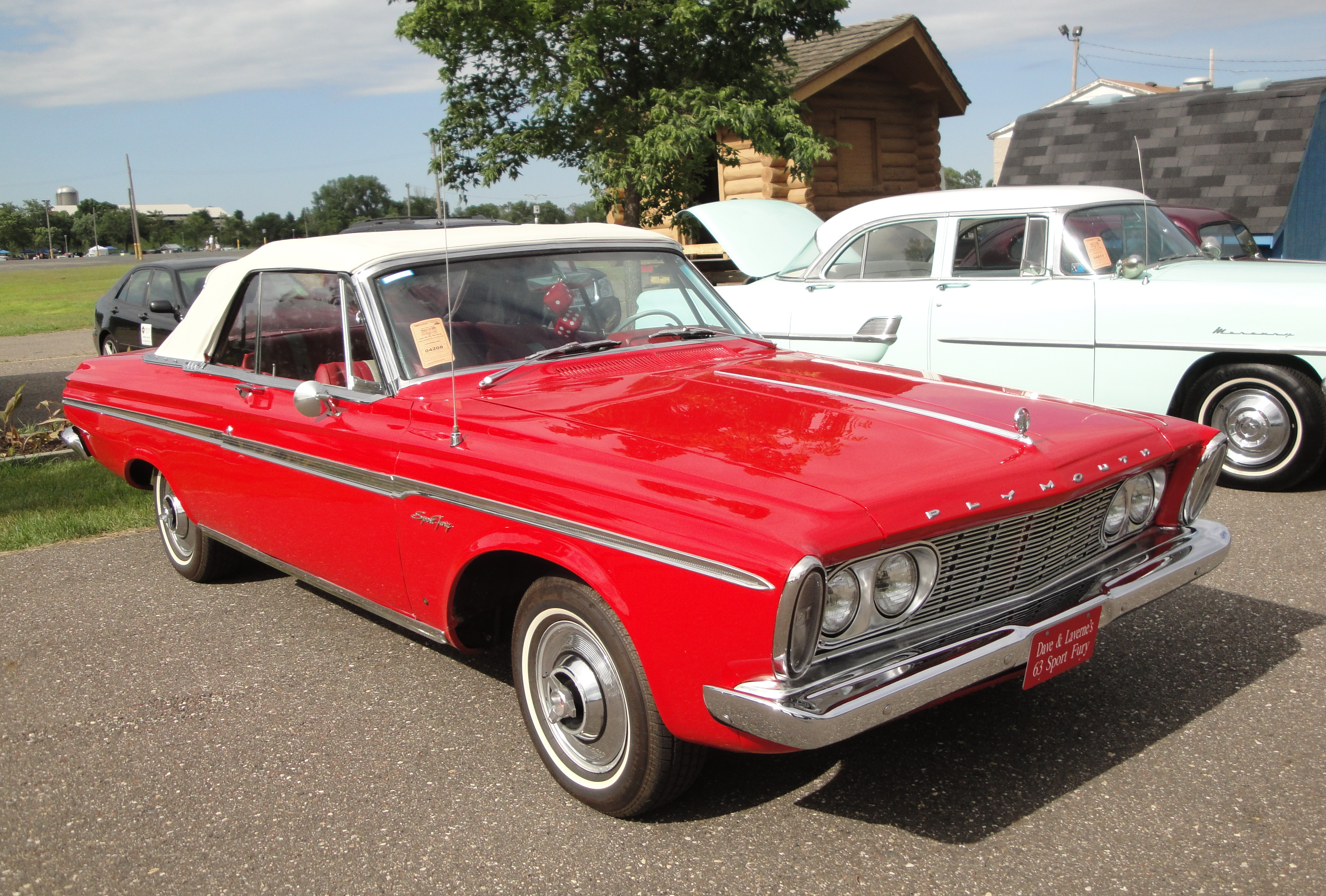
1963 Plymouth Sport Fury Convertible

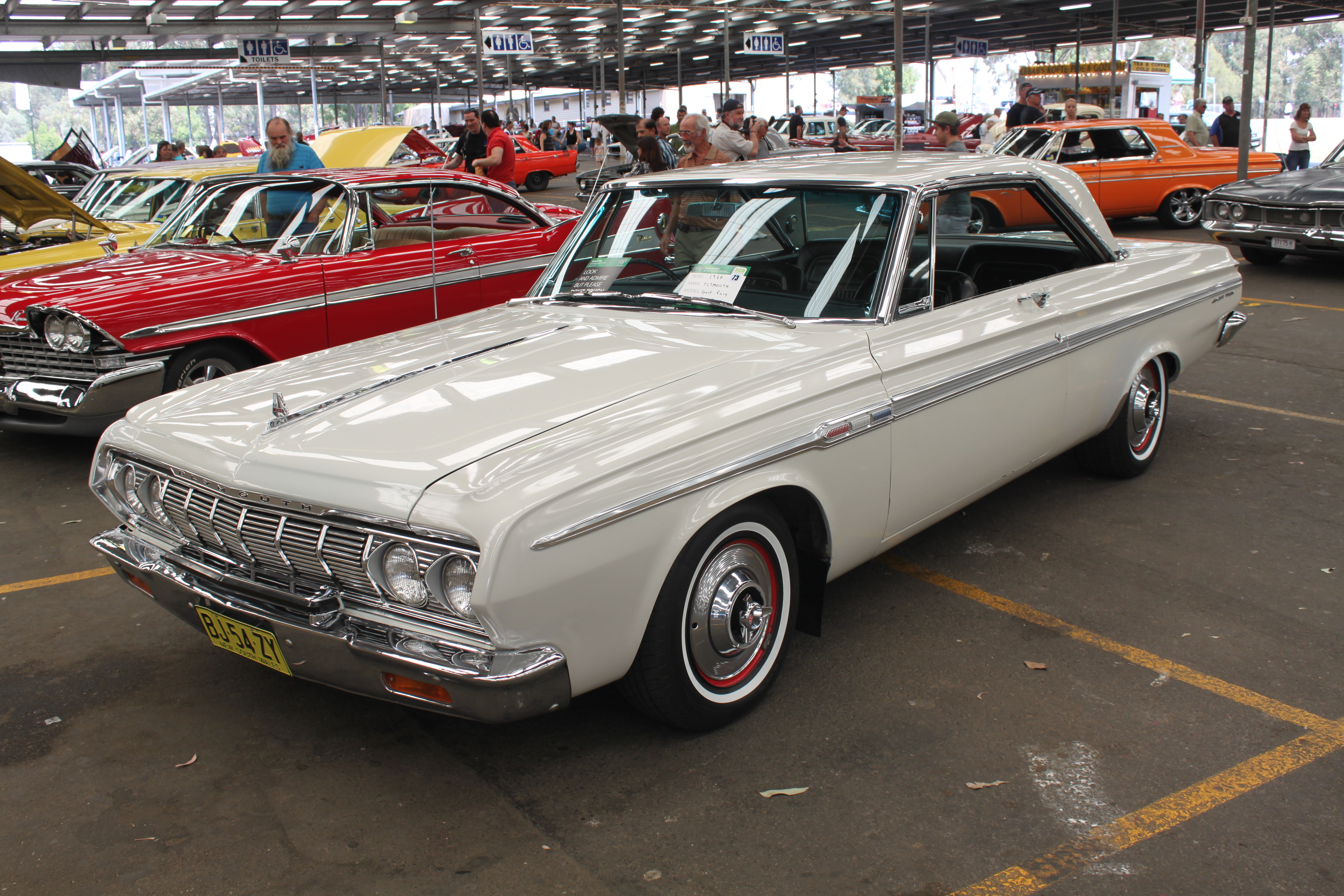
1964 Plymouth Sport Fury Two-Door Hardtop

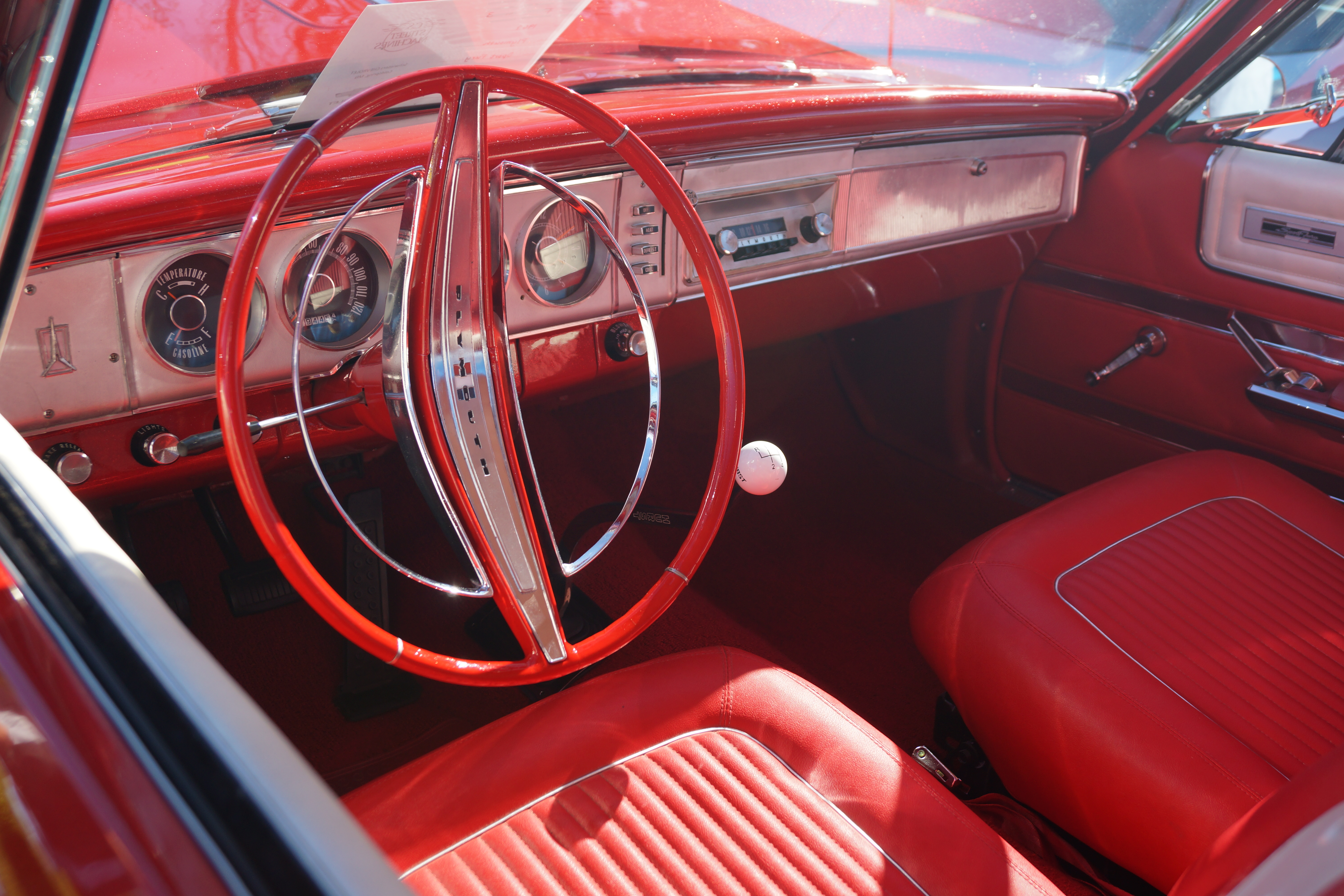
1964 Plymouth Sport Fury interior

== Fourth generation (1965–1968) ==
Fourth generation
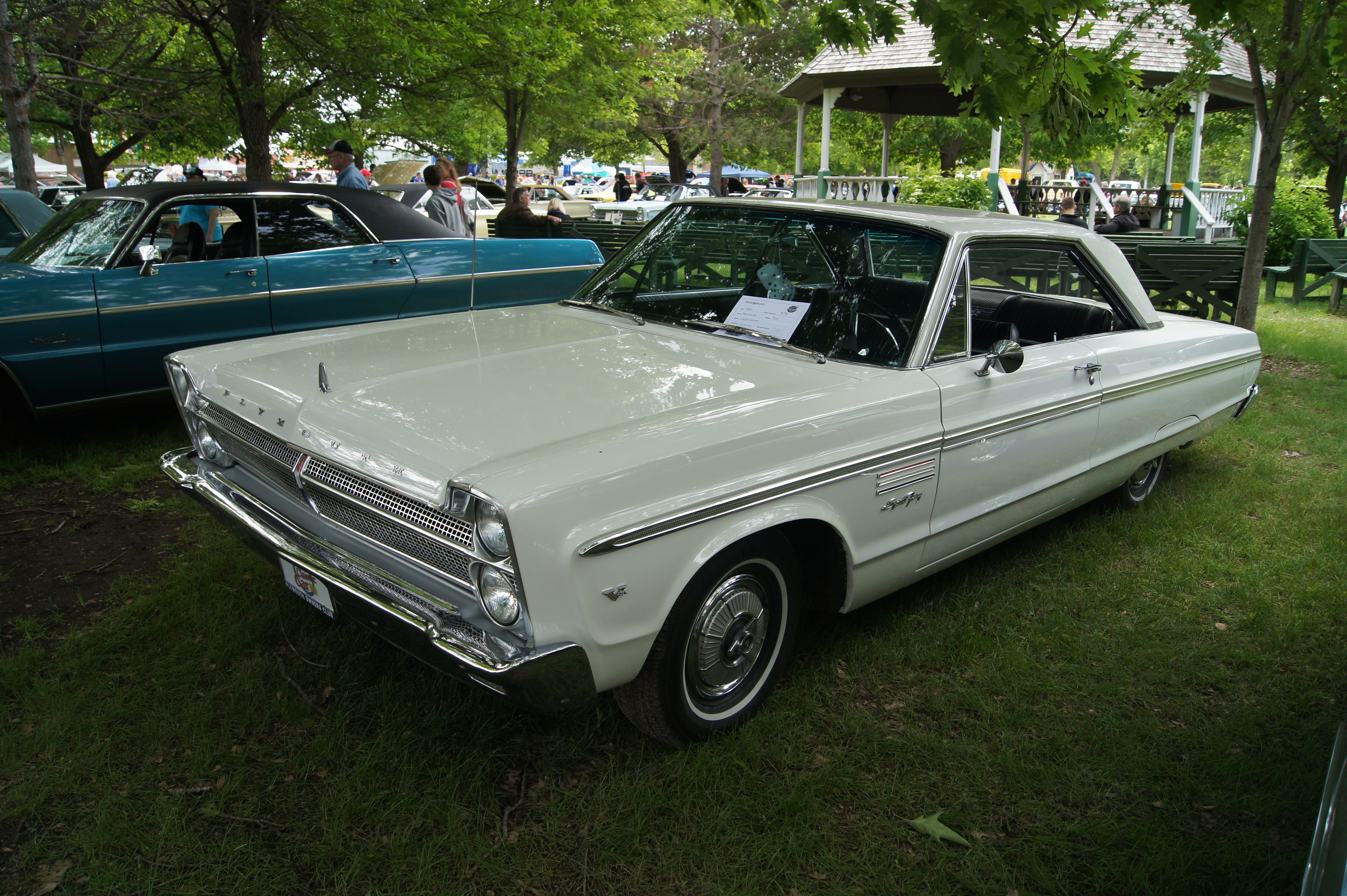
- 1965 Plymouth Sport Fury

Overview
- Also called: Plymouth Sport Fury; Plymouth VIP
- Model years: 1965–1968 (Fury and Sport Fury); 1966–1968 (VIP)
- Assembly: Lynch Road Assembly, Detroit, Michigan; Belvidere Assembly Plant, Belvidere, Illinois

Body and chassis
- Body style: 4-door wagon (1965-68); 4-door sedan (1965-68); 2-door sedan (1965-68); 4-door hardtop (1965-68); 2-door hardtop (1965-68); 2-door hardtop (1967-68 "fasttop" model); 2-door convertible (1965-68)
- Platform: C-body
- Related: Dodge Polara; Dodge Phoenix (Australian Export)

Powertrain
- Engine: 225 cu in (3.7 L) RG I6; 318 cu in (5.2 L) LA V8; 383 cu in (6.3 L) B V8; 426 cu in (7.0 L) Wedge V8; 440 cu in (7.2 L) RB V8
- Transmission: 3-speed automatic 3-speed manual 4-speed manual

Dimensions
- Wheelbase: 119.0 in (3,023 mm); Station Wagon: 121.0 in (3,073 mm)

In 1965, Chrysler returned the Fury to the new, full-size Chrysler C-body platform. The new 1965 Plymouth line included three special Furys: the Fury I, Fury II, and Fury III. The Fury I was the basic model, while the Fury II and Fury III offered more trim and features. Full size Furys had options such as automatic transmissions, power steering, white sidewall tires (along with full wheel covers), stereo radios, vinyl tops, and air conditioning. The Sport Fury was the highest trim and feature model, positioned to compete with the Chevrolet Impala Super Sport and Ford Galaxie 500/XL. It offered a sportier interior and exterior trim package. The Fury II was available as a two-door hardtop in Canada only; in the U.S. it was only available as a two- or four-door sedan, and as a station wagon.

The overall design changed, with the grille losing chrome but gaining two vertical stacked headlights on each side. All rode on new 119 in (3,023 mm) wheelbases (121 in (3,073 mm) for the wagons)—1 in (25 mm) longer than before. The 426 "street wedge" V8 was introduced, rated at 385 hp (287 kW) and finally street-legal.

The 1966 Furys kept the same profile as the 1965s, with a split front and rear grille motif. To complete with the new luxury-focused models such as the Ford Galaxie 500 LTD, Chevrolet Impala Caprice, and AMC Ambassador DPL, Plymouth introduced a plush, luxurious edition of the Fury, called the VIP. Available initially as a four-door hardtop in the fall of 1965, it was joined in early 1966 by a two-door hardtop. Interiors featured plush upholstery, door panels were contoured with ample woodgrain trim throughout the cabin, while the exterior got "VIP" emblems and fender skirts as standard. Although the car was essentially an upgraded Fury III, it was marketed as a separate model. The VIP included Chrysler's 318 cu in (5.2 L) V8 mated to a three-speed manual transmission, although the vast majority were ordered with the TorqueFlite automatic.

For 1967, the body was restyled with a sharp, angular profile. The stacked quad headlight bezels were curvier and set more deeply into the body, giving the car a more muscular look. The roofline had sharper angles and gave the car a longer, more luxurious appearance. A new, formal two-door hardtop body style appeared which featured smaller rear quarter windows and a wider, back-slanted "C" pillar. Called the "fast top", it was offered alongside the restyled thin "C" pillar hardtop in both VIP and Sport Fury series (as well as on corresponding big Dodge models). The 1967 model year introduced new safety regulations, which meant that for the first time, all Plymouths included dual-circuit brake master cylinders, energy-absorbing steering columns and wheels, recessed instrument panel controls, and shoulder belt mounting points for outboard front seat occupants.1967 also marked the end of the 318 cu in (5.2 L) V8, replaced by the thin-wall-casting LA (lightweight A) engine, now the base V8, with wedge-shaped combustion chambers, producing more power, even though the advertised number did not change, and significant weight reduction. The 318 LA engine did not appear on export or cars sold in Canada until 1968.

The 1968 model year Furys received only minor grille updates along with side marker lights and shoulder belts for front outboard occupants (except the convertibles). At the rear, however, all models except the station wagons received new sheet metal, including reshaped rear doors on four-door models. Meanwhile, the Suburban badge returned to station wagons after having been retired in 1961. The Suburban, Custom Suburban, and Sport Suburban corresponded to the Fury I, II, and III models.

From 1966 until 1969, a luxury version of the Fury called the "Plymouth VIP" (marketed as the "very important Plymouth" in 1966) was fielded, in response to the Ford LTD, Chevrolet Caprice, and the AMC Ambassador DPL. These models came with standards such as full wheel covers, vinyl tops, luxuriously upholstered interiors with walnut dashboards and door-panel trim, a thicker grade of carpeting, more sound insulation, and full courtesy lighting.

In Australia, the full-size Dodge Phoenix was based on the Dodge Dart and the 440 until 1965, when it became a right-hand drive version of the contemporary Fury. The Phoenix continued in production in Australia until 1972, each based on that year's North American Plymouth Fury.

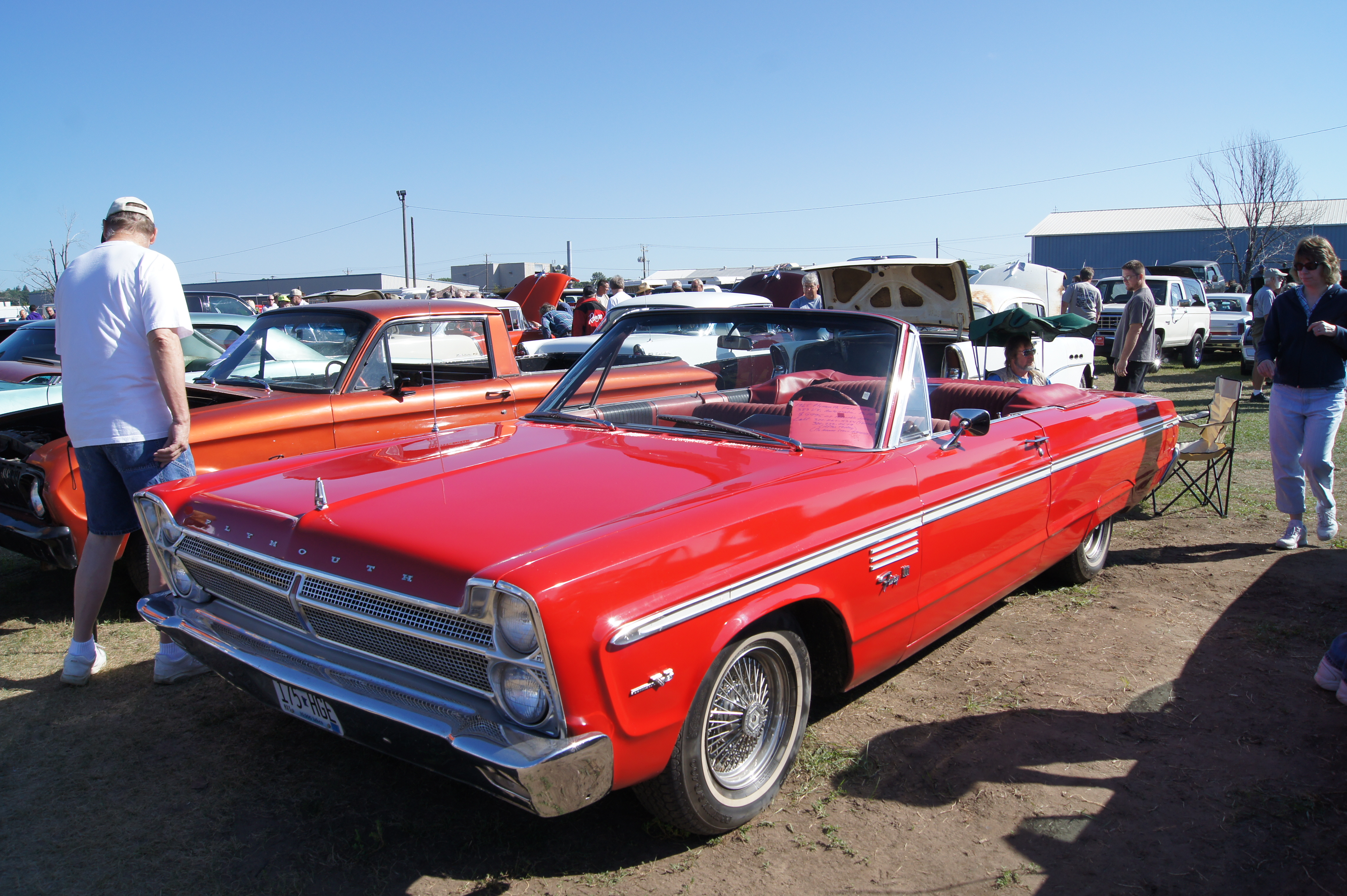
1965 Plymouth Fury III convertible

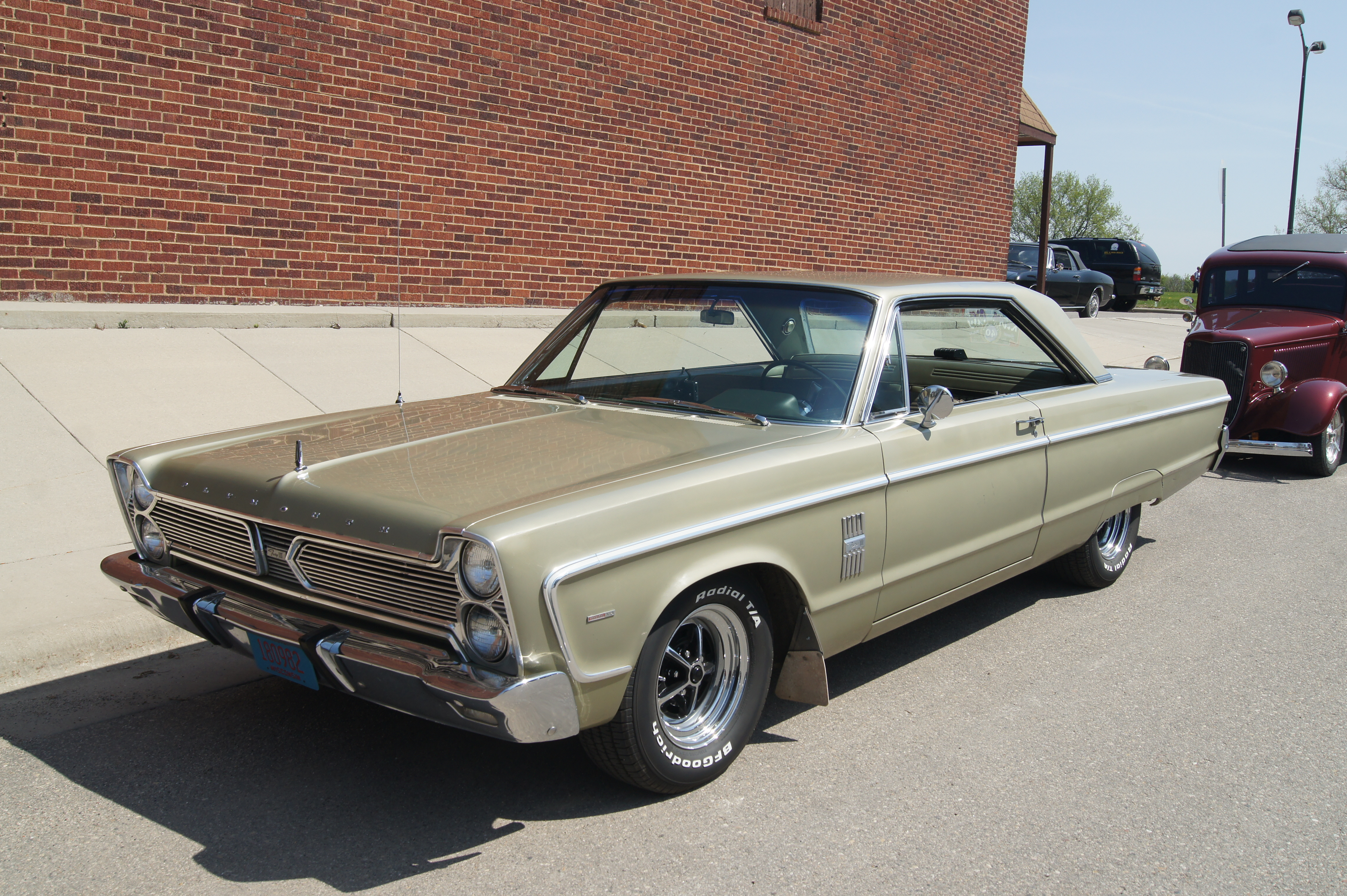
1966 Plymouth Fury III 2-door hardtop

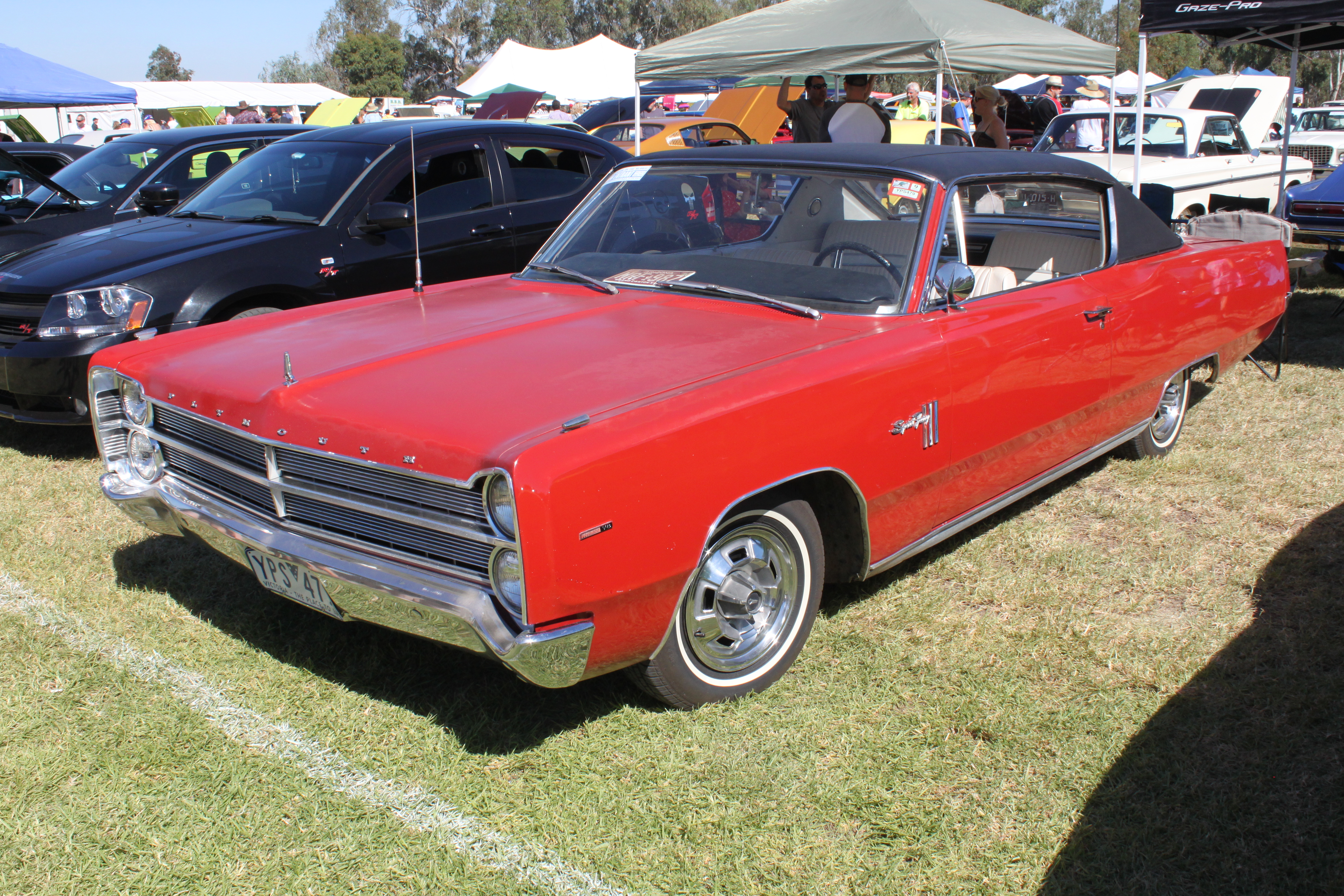
1967 Plymouth Sport Fury 2-door Fast Top

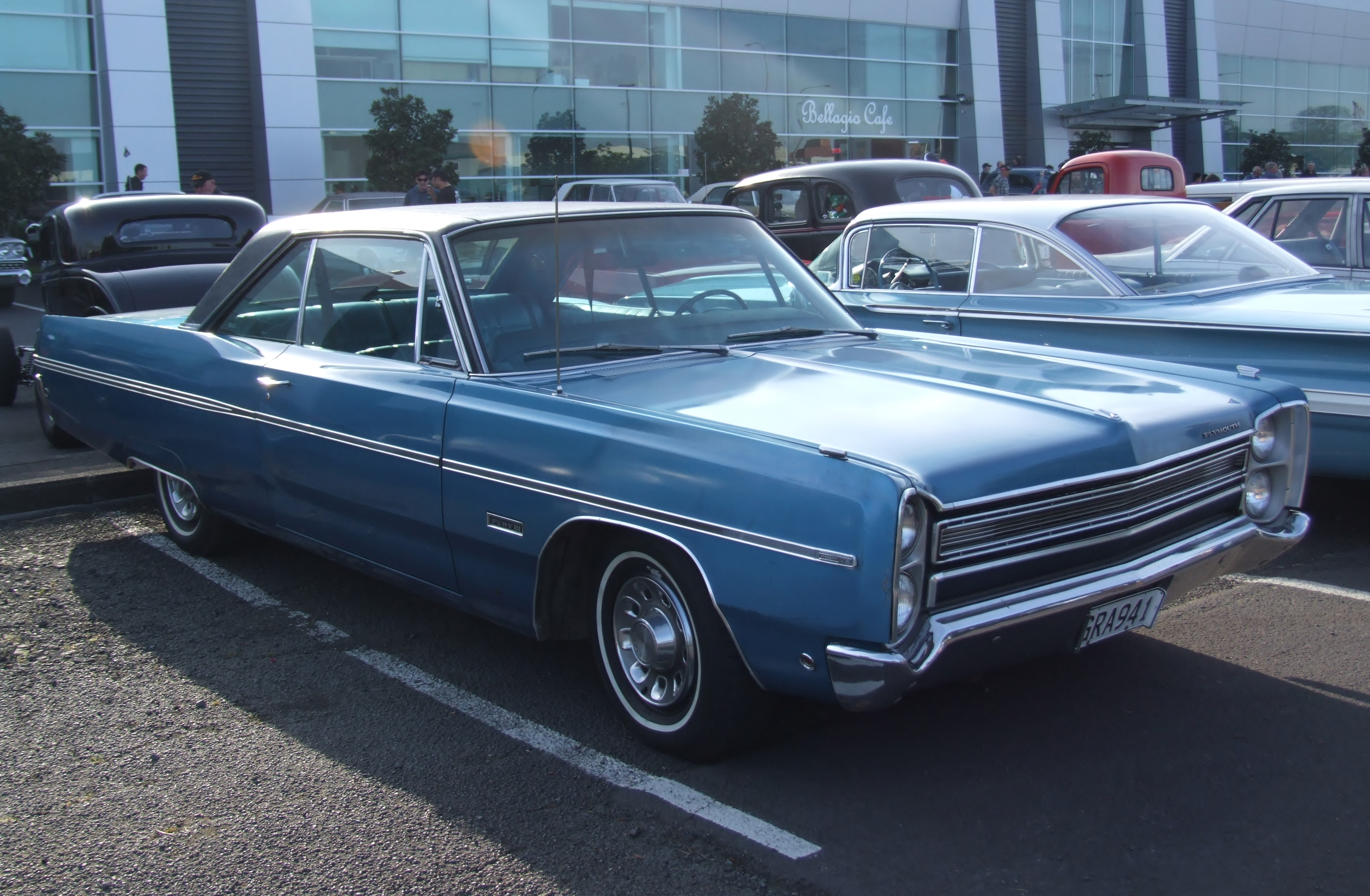
1968 Plymouth Fury III 2-door hardtop

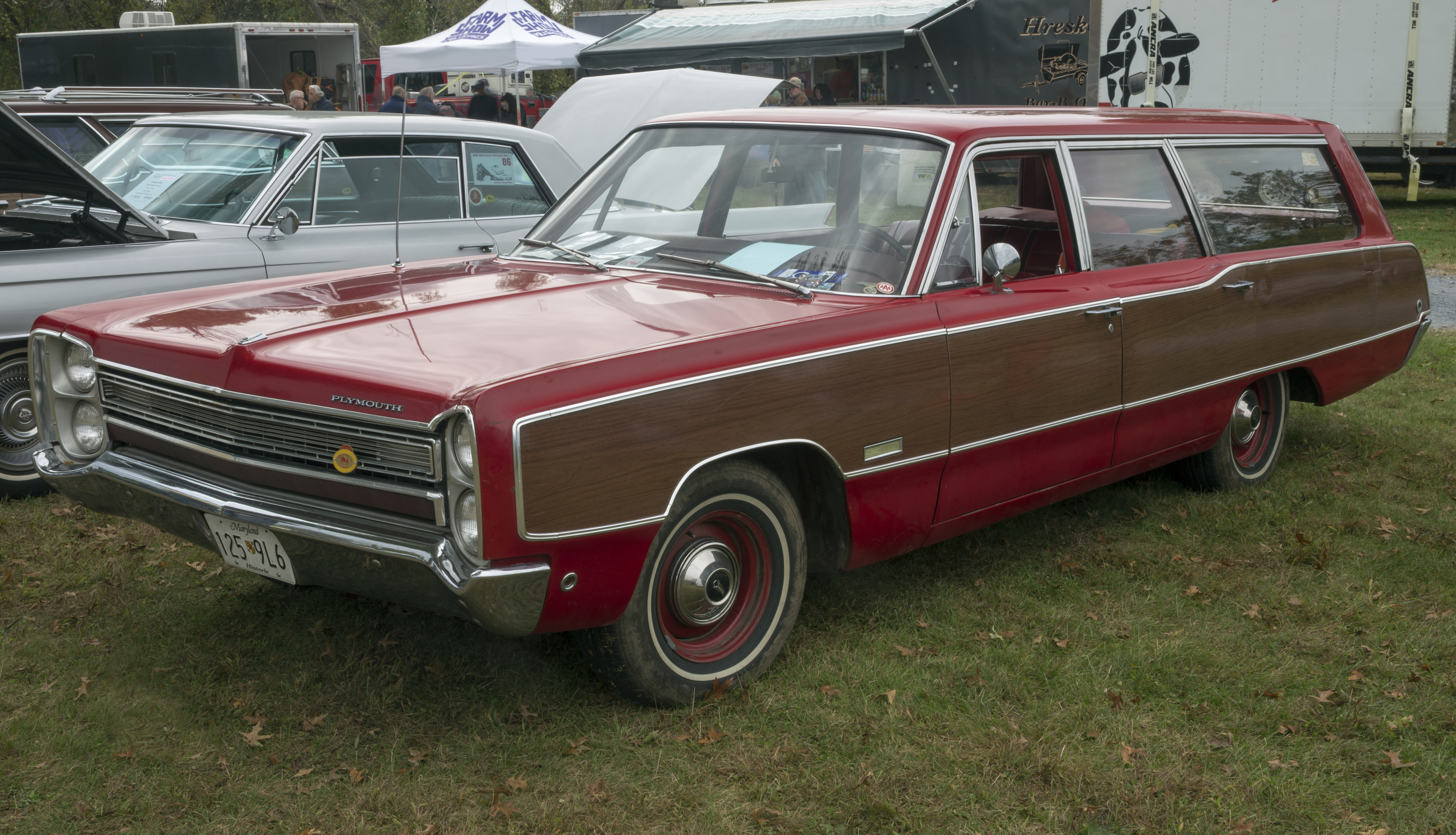
1968 Plymouth Sport Suburban

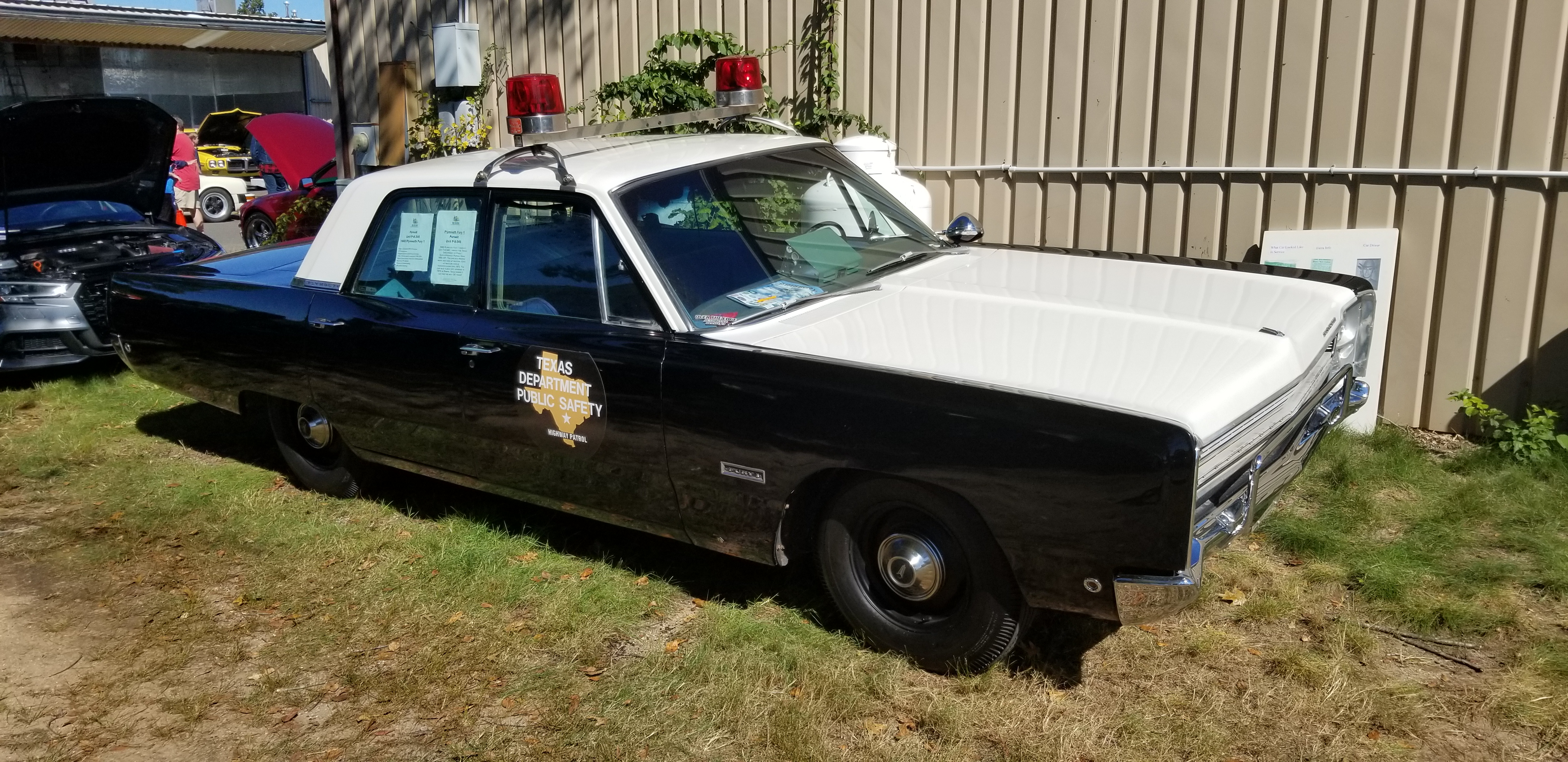
A 1968 Texas Department of Public Safety Plymouth Fury.

== Fifth generation (1969–1973) ==
Fifth generation
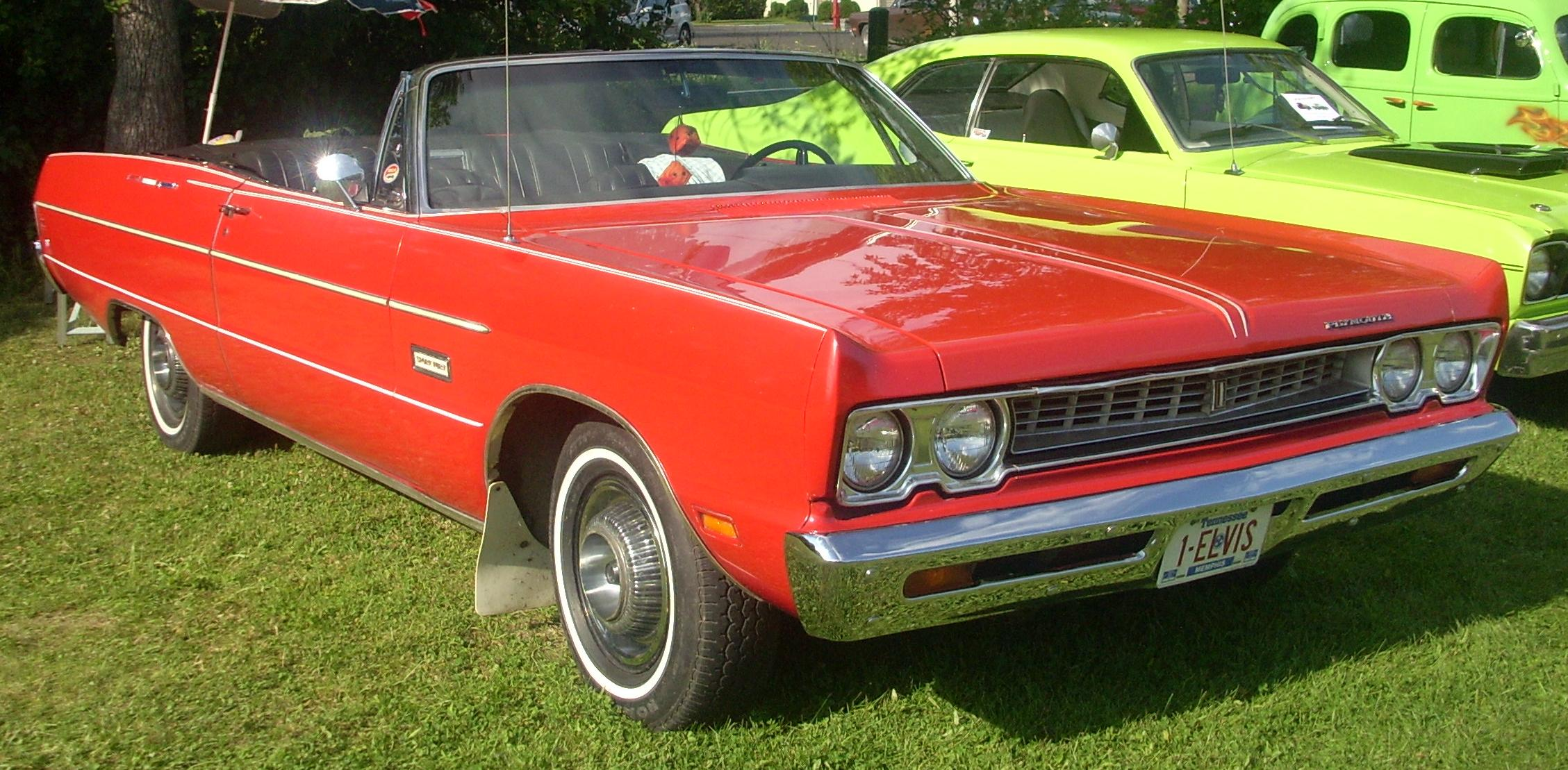
- 1969 Plymouth Sport Fury Convertible

Overview
- Also called: Plymouth Sport Fury; Plymouth VIP
- Model years: 1969–1973 (Fury); 1969–1971 (Sport Fury); 1969 (VIP)

Body and chassis
- Body style: 2-door hardtop 2-door convertible 4-door sedan 4-door hardtop 4-door station wagon
- Platform: C-body
- Related: Dodge Phoenix (Australia)

Powertrain
- Engine: 225 cu in (3.7 L) RG I6; 318 cu in (5.2 L) LA V8; 360 cu in (5.9 L) LA V8; 383 cu in (6.3 L) B V8; 400 cu in (6.6 L) B V8; 440 cu in (7.2 L) RB V8

Dimensions
- Wheelbase: 120.0 in (3,048 mm); 122.0 in (3,099 mm) (Station Wagon)

The 1969 Fury received a partial facelift, and was again available as a 2-door hardtop, 2-door convertible, 4-door hardtop, 4-door sedan, and 4-door station wagon. For 1970, the VIP was discontinued and a 4-door hardtop was added to the Sport Fury range, which also gained a new hardtop coupe. This was available in "GT" trim; the 1970 and 1971 Sport Fury GTs were powered by the 440 cu in (7.2 L) engine, which in 1970 could be ordered with three 2-barrel (twin-choke) carburetors (the "6-Barrel on Plymouth and 6-PAK for Dodge") producing 390 hp and 490 ft-lbs of torque. The base model engine produced 350 hp (261 kW).

The 1969 models included the Fury I, Fury II, and Fury III, the sport-model Sport Fury, and the top-line VIP. The 225 cubic-inch six-cylinder engine continued as standard on the Fury I, II, and select III models, with the 318 cu in (5.2 L) V8 standard on the Sport Fury, some Fury III models, and all VIP models plus the station wagon. A three-speed manual transmission was standard, with the TorqueFlite automatic transmission optional. The six-cylinder engine/three-speed manual transmission power team – along with the three-speed manual transmission on the 318 cu in (5.2 L) V8 – continued to be available until midway through the 1971 model year, after which all full-sized Plymouths were built with a V8 engine, including the new 360 cubic inch engine and automatic transmission. Parking lights now illuminated with the headlights, which meant that if one headlight was inoperative in low beam, oncoming drivers would not mistake the car for a motorcycle in the dark.

For 1970 model year the Fury fully gained Chrysler's round-sided "Fuselage Look" styling, a year later than the lead models featuring it. The VIP model was dropped, with the Sport Fury line expanded to include a four-door hardtop sedan. An optional Brougham package, which included individually-adjustable split bench seats with passenger recliner and luxurious trim comparable to the former VIP series, was available on Sport Furys; a Sport Fury GT and S/23 models. The S/23 was dropped for 1971, with new options including an electric sunroof (for top-line models) and a stereo tape player with a microphone, making it possible to record off the radio or take dictation.

The 1971 model year offered a new Sport Fury 4-door sedan and a 2-door sedan (similar to the Sport Fury hardtop but with fixed rear quarter windows) in the Fury I series. A hardtop coupe was now available in the Fury II series, and a Formal Hardtop was available for both Sport Fury and Fury III. New options included headlight washers and a stereo cassette recorder. The LA 360 cubic engine was introduced, the largest production "smallblock" V8 built by Chrysler Corporation. A new Fury Custom model came out in May and was priced between the Fury I and II.

For 1972, the Fury was facelifted with a large chrome twin-loop bumper design with a small insignia space between the loops and hidden headlamps as standard equipment on the Sport Suburban, and the newly introduced Fury Gran Coupe and Gran Sedan, which eventually would become the Plymouth Gran Fury; the Sport Fury and GT models were dropped, while the new Fury Gran series offered an optional Brougham package. The six-cylinder engine, strangled by emissions requirements, was no longer offered in full-size Plymouths. On the other hand, a 400 cubic inch V8 was now an option. For 1973, the front end was redesigned with a new grille and headlamp setup, along with bumpers capable of withstanding 5 mph (8 km/h) impacts. The 360 became the standard engine for Fury Suburbans.

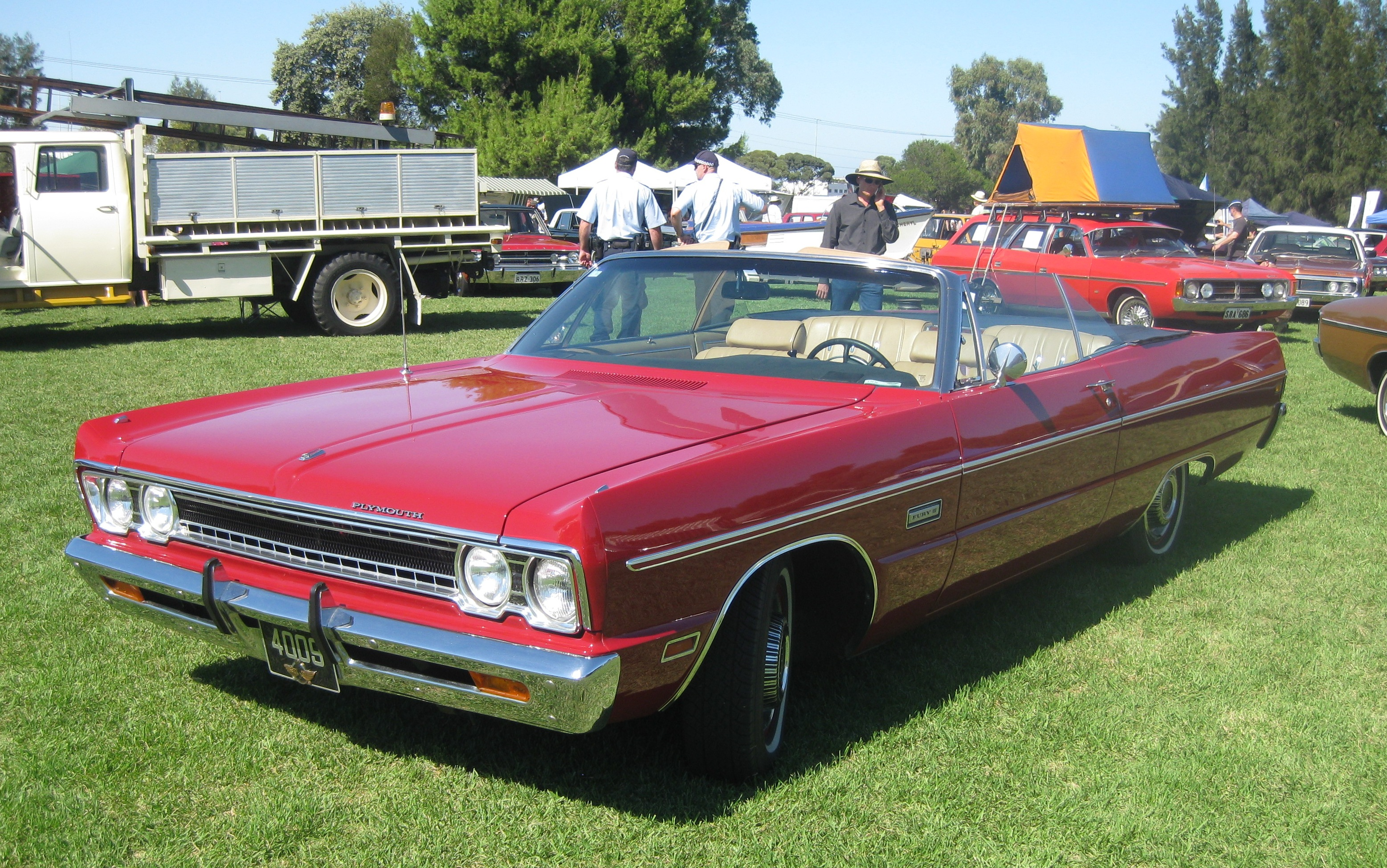
1969 Fury III Convertible

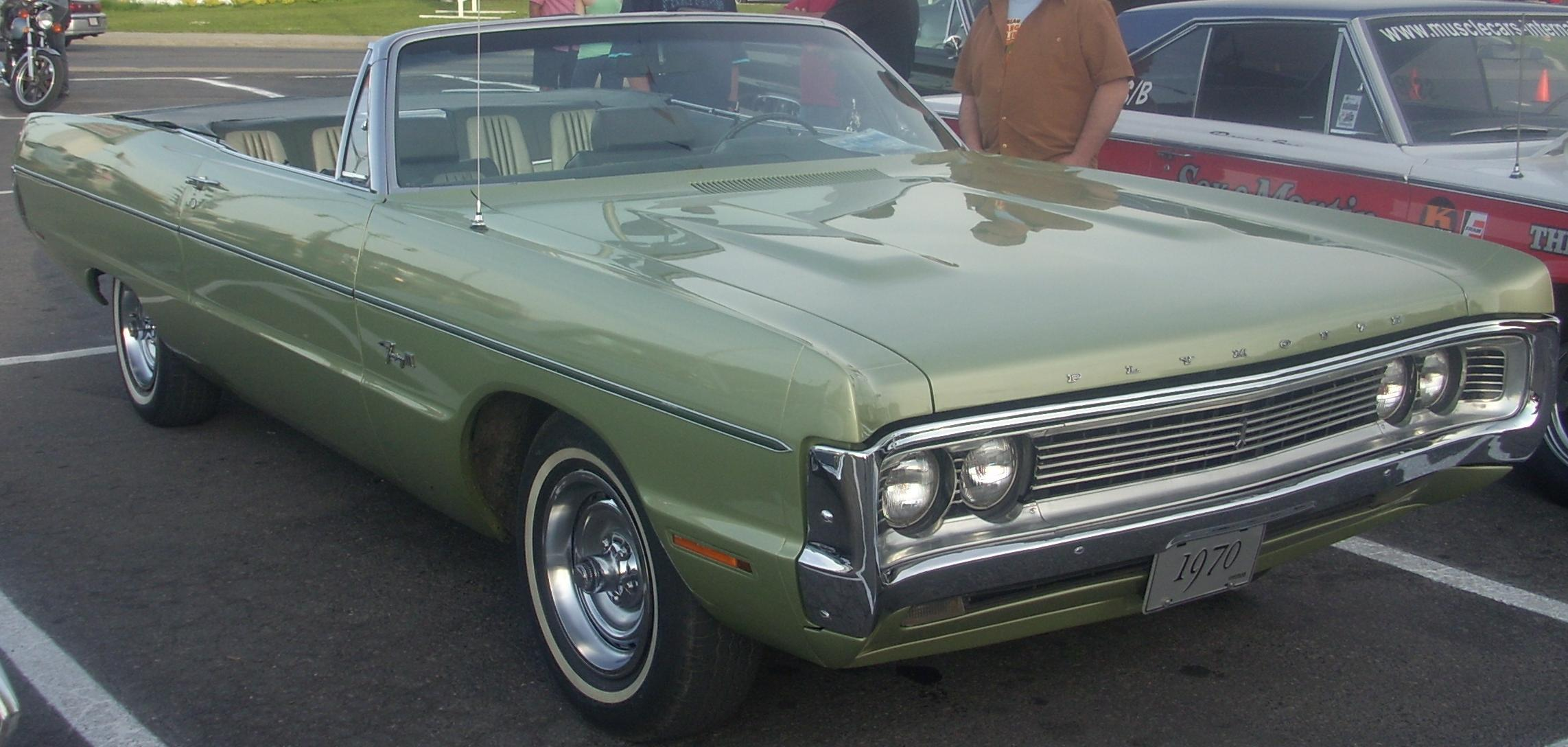
1970 Fury III convertible

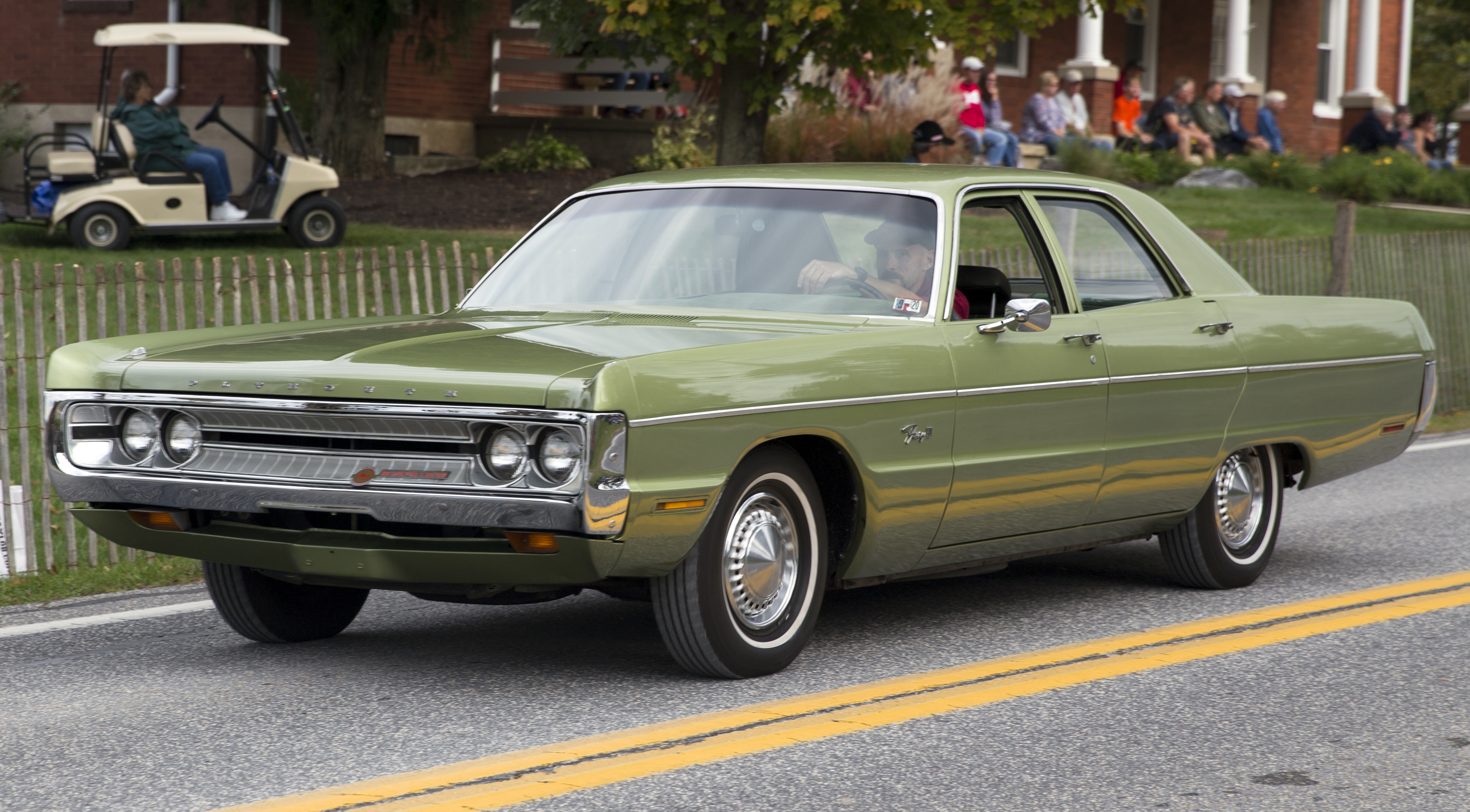
1971 Plymouth Fury II 4-Door Sedan

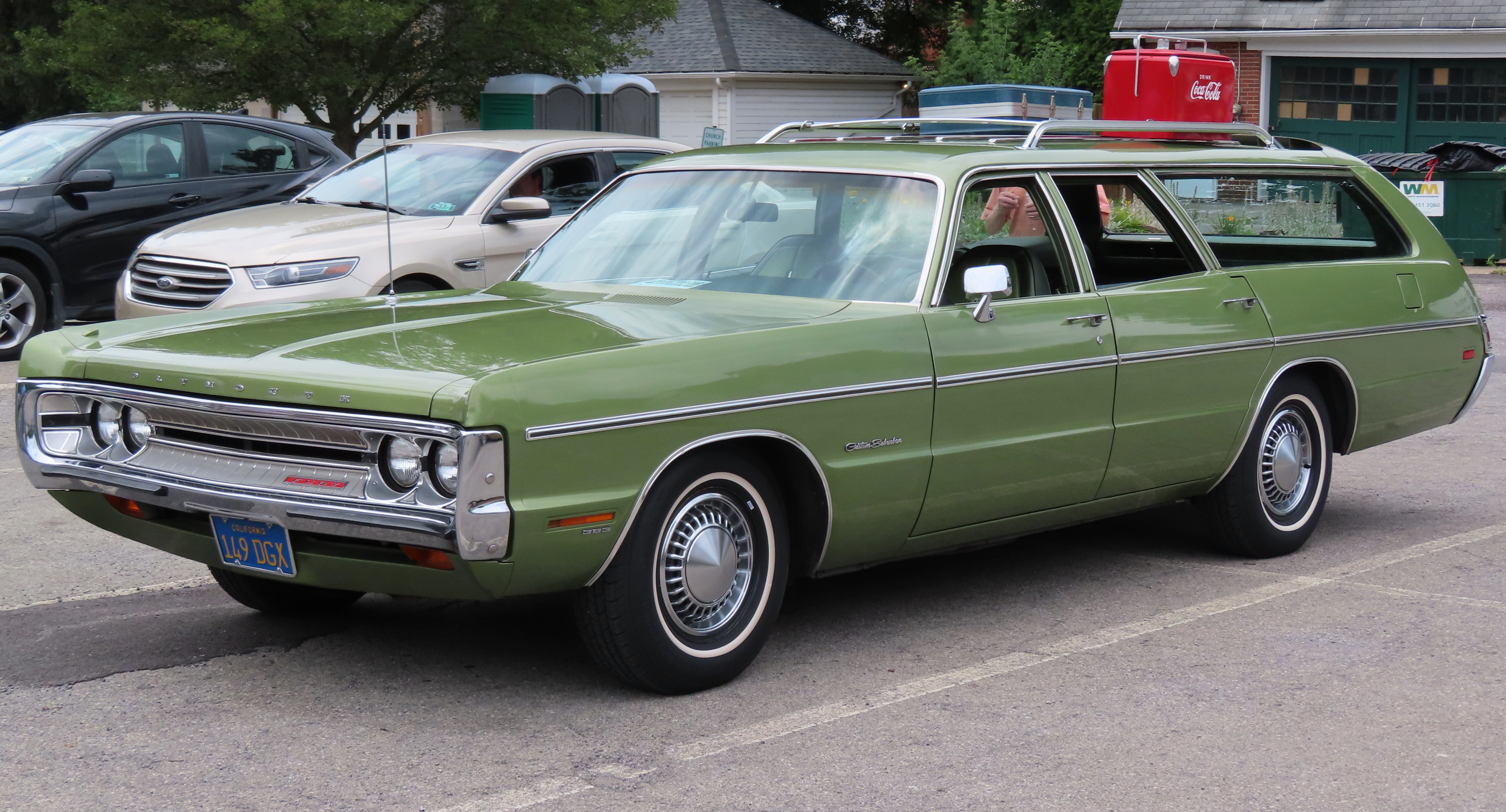
1971 Plymouth Fury Custom Suburban

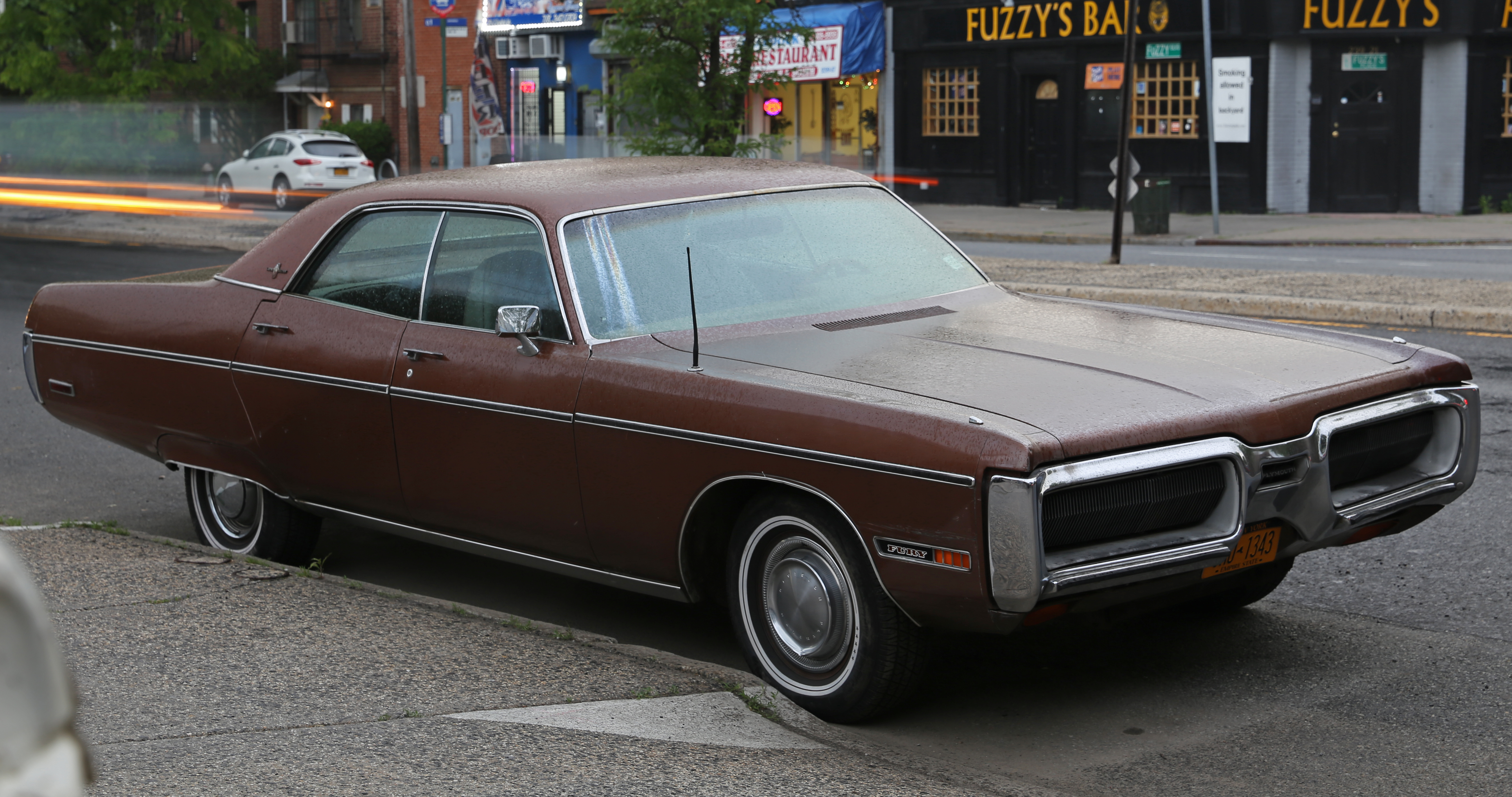
1972 Fury Gran Sedan with hidden headlamps

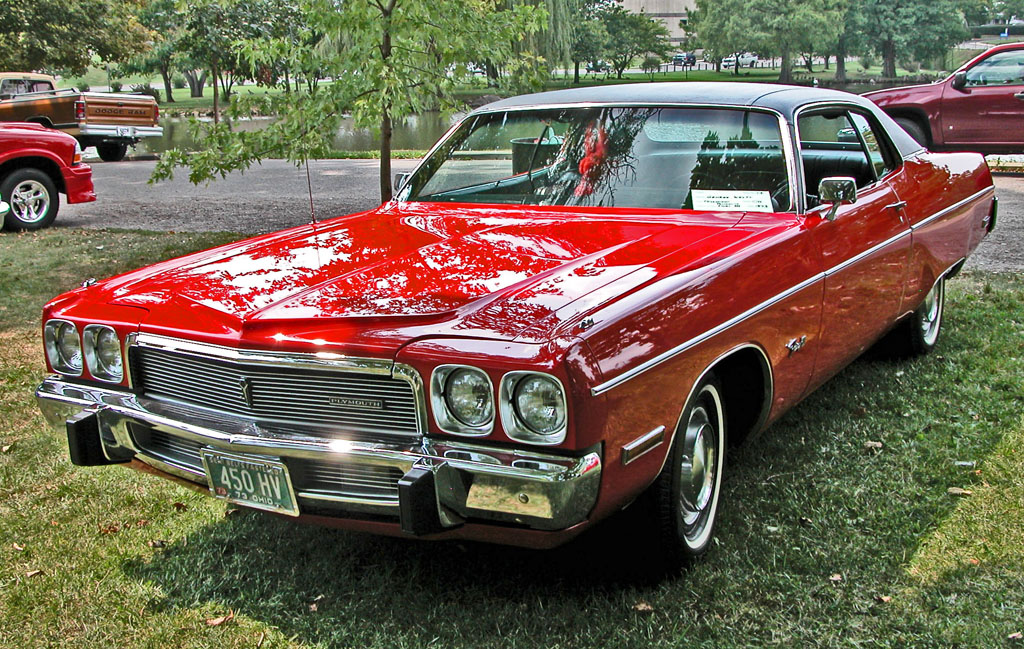
1973 Plymouth Fury III 2-Door

== Sixth generation (1974) ==
Sixth generation
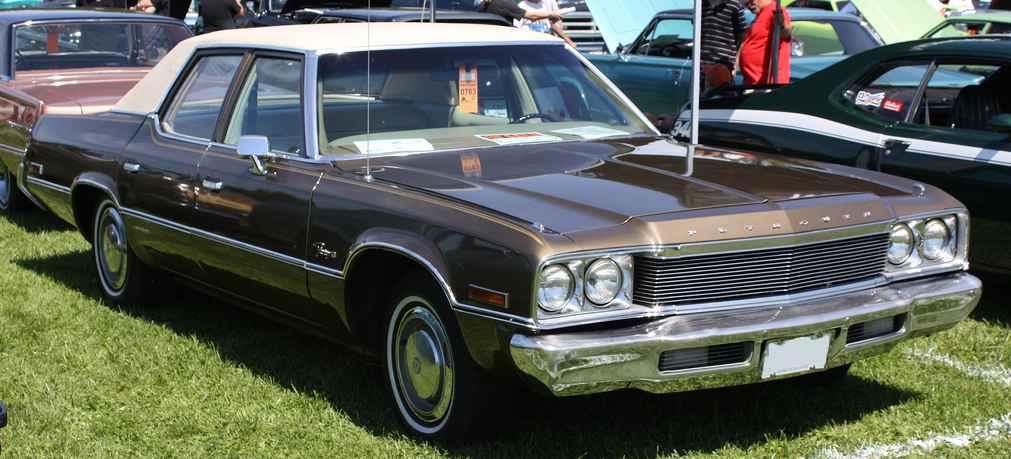
- 1974 Plymouth Fury 4-door sedan

Overview
- Production: 1973–1974
- Model years: 1974

Body and chassis
- Body style: 4-door wagon 4-door sedan 4-door hardtop 2-door hardtop
- Platform: C-body

Powertrain
- Engine: 318 cu in (5.21 L) "LA" V8; 360 cu in (5.9 L) "LA" V8; 400 cu in (6.6 L) "B" V8; 440 cu in (7.2 L) "RB" V8

Dimensions
- Wheelbase: 121.5 in (3,086 mm); 124 in (3,150 mm) (Station Wagon)

For 1974 model year the Fury shared Chrysler's all-new full-size C-body platform in common with the concurrent flagship Chrysler Imperial (1974-75); New Yorker (1974-78), Newport (1974-78) and Town & Country (1974-77); and with the Dodge Monaco (1974-76) and Royal Monaco (1977). Styling was more squared off with lower beltlines and greater use of glass than with Chrysler's previous fuselage generation (1969-73), also with cues more similar to the model year 1971 and later GM "B" bodies and model year 1973–74 Mercurys. The unibody structure with subframe for engine/transmission was retained along with other typical Chrysler Corporation engineering features including torsion bar front suspension and asymmetrical multi-leaf springs in the rear.

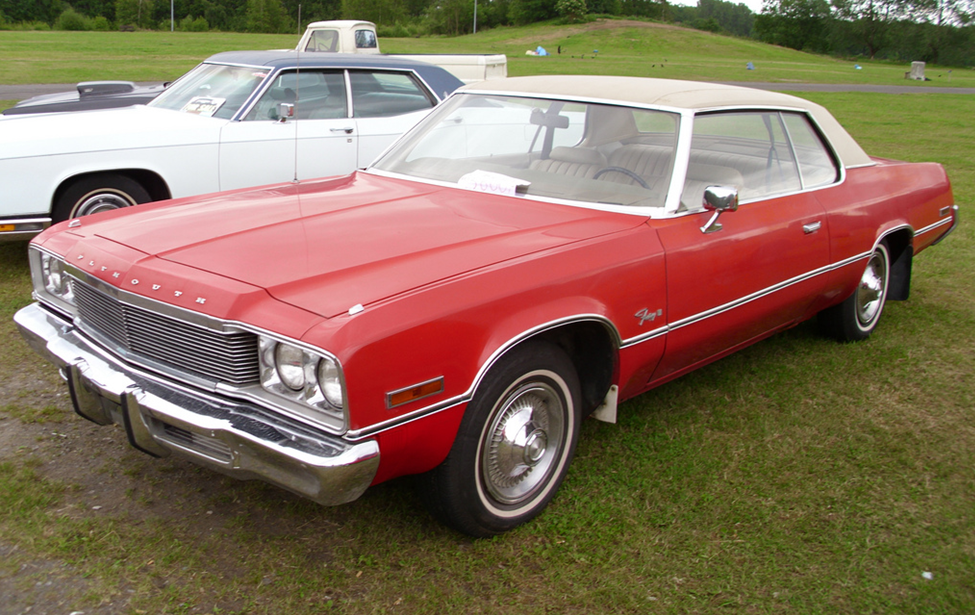
1974 Plymouth Fury II 2-door hardtop

Model lineup again included the Fury I, Fury II, Fury III and Gran Fury series, plus the Suburban and Sport Suburban station wagons. Engine offerings included a standard 360 cu in (5.9 L) V8 with two-barrel carburetor on sedans and coupes, a two-barrel 400 cu in (6.6 L) V8 standard on wagons and optional on other models, and four-barrel carbureted 400 and 440 cu in (7.2 L) V8s optional on all models.

All 1974 Furys came standard with TorqueFlite automatic transmissions, power steering, and power front disc brakes.

As part of the company's efforts to make ordering a well-equipped car easier, two special model packages were available: a basic group (which had items already ordered on a majority of full-sized Plymouths, such as an AM radio, air conditioning, light group and tinted glass) and a luxury group (which added items such as cruise control, power windows and an AM/FM stereo radio). The Brougham package, whose centerpiece was the individually-adjustable 50/50 divided front seat with individual center armrests and recliners, was still available for Gran Furys. New options included Chrysler's chronometer (an electronic digital clock), a gauge alert system that used light-emitting diodes to monitor engine functions and automatic temperature control.

For information on Chrysler's full-size C-body Plymouth (from model years 1975-77), see Plymouth Gran Fury.

== Seventh generation (1975–1978) ==
Seventh generation
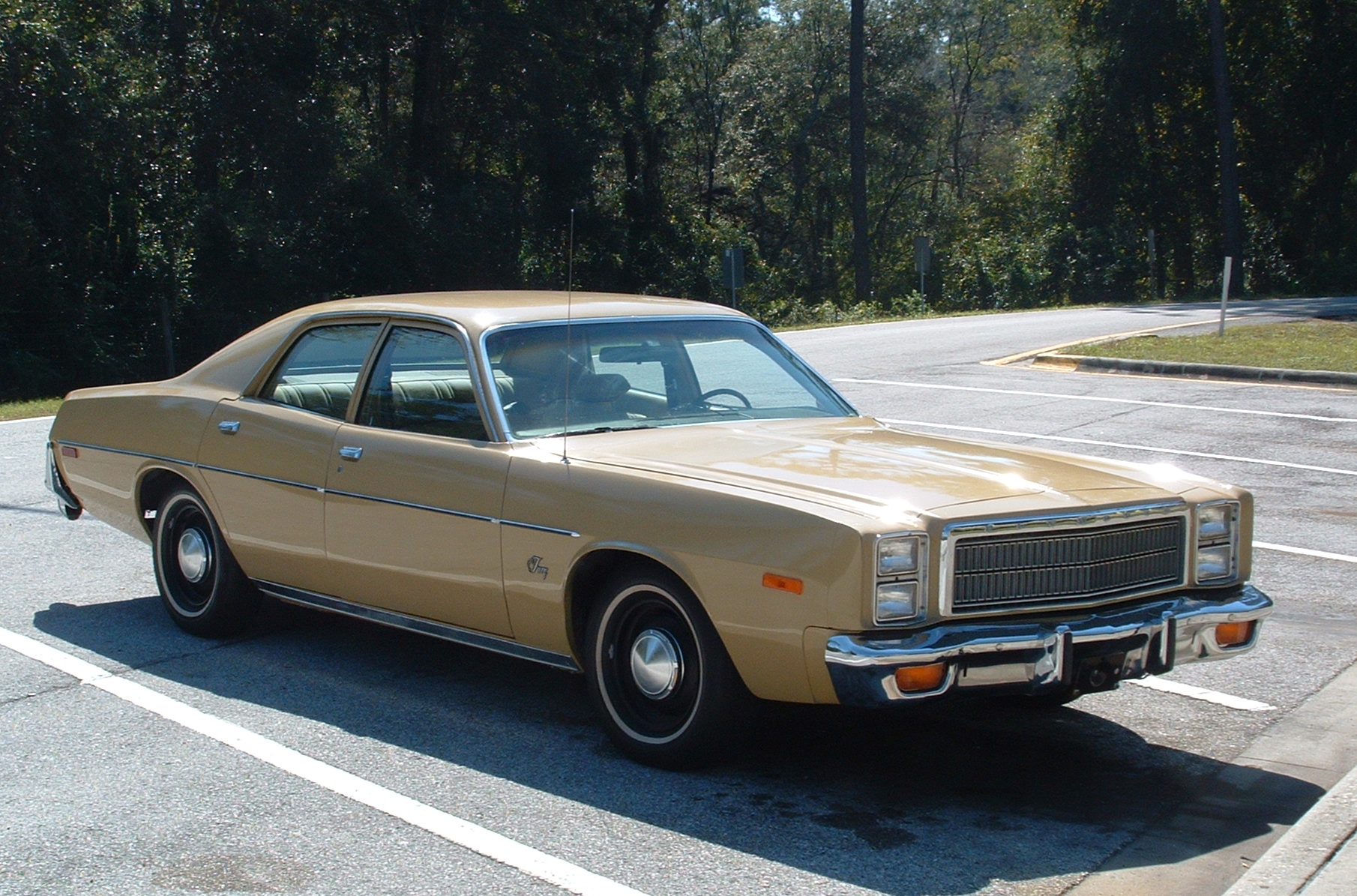
- 1978 Plymouth Fury 4-door sedan

Overview
- Model years: 1975–1978

Body and chassis
- Body style: 4-door wagon 4-door sedan 2-door hardtop/coupe
- Platform: B-body

Powertrain
- Engine: 225 cu in (3.69 L) slant-6 "30-D economy six" 1-bbl 225 cu in (3.69 L) Slant-6 2-bbl (1976–1978); 318 cu in (5.21 L) "LA" V8 2-bbl 360 cu in (5.9 L) "LA" V8 2 & 4-bbl 400 cu in (6.6 L) "B" V8 2 & 4-bbl 440 cu in (7.2 L) "Magnum" V8 4-bbl (police 4-door sedan)

Dimensions
- Wheelbase: Sedan: 117.5 in (2,984 mm); Coupe: 115.0 in (2,921 mm)

For the 1975 model year, Chrysler moved the Fury name, which had been part of the full-size C-body Plymouth model line up during the previous ten model years, over to the restyled mid-size B-body line, which had been marketed as the Satellite previously. The "Road Runner" was offered as the top-of-the-line model of the redesigned Plymouth Fury 2-door line up, then it was moved over to the Plymouth Volare line up during the following model year (1976). The full-size Plymouth, now known as the Plymouth Gran Fury, lasted through 1977. The entire mid-size Plymouth Fury line up was discontinued at the end of the 1978 model year, replaced in Canada by the rebadged Dodge Diplomat model called the Plymouth Caravelle (not to be confused with the E-body Plymouth Caravelle from 1983 until 1988 and also the 1985 through 1988 Plymouth Caravelle for the American car market). During the entire 1979 model year, there were no Fury models marketed by Plymouth.

Only minor styling changes occurred from the 1975 through the 1978 model years, most notably, during the 1977 model year when quad stacked square headlights (see photo) replaced the previous round dual beam headlights, the front turn signals, previously on the outboard edges of the grille, were moved over to the cutouts in the front bumper. Tail lights received amber turn signal lenses in place of the previous red turn signal lenses. Various 2-door models had no centerposts and some of them were true hardtops with roll-down rear windows. Other two-door models had fixed rear windows even though they had no centerposts. For the most part, the Plymouth Fury two-door models, during the 1975 and 1978 model years, were labeled as "hardtops".

The Plymouth Fury, 1975-1978, shared its B-body and unibody structure with the Dodge Coronet (1975-1976), Dodge Monaco (1977-1978) and the corporation's new personal-luxury coupe models, Chrysler Cordoba (1975-1979) and Dodge Charger SE (1975-1978). All the four-door models, wagons and sedans, continued with the basic body shells that were introduced for the 1971 model year, rode on a 118 in (2,997 mm) wheelbase, while the various two-door models—which were restyled with new and more formal sheetmetal and rooflines—rode on the 115 in (2,921 mm) wheelbase.

Before 1975, the Plymouth Satellite had a 117 in (2,972 mm) wheelbase, while the Dodge Coronet had a 118 in (2,997 mm) wheelbase. For 1975, the mid-size Plymouth Fury had a 117.5 in (2,984 mm) wheelbase and the 1975 Dodge Coronet had the same wheelbase.

Before 1974, the Plymouth Fury had a 120 in (3,048 mm) wheelbase, while the Dodge Monaco/Polara had a 122 in (3,099 mm) wheelbase. For 1974, the Plymouth Gran Fury and Dodge Monaco had the same 121.5 in (3,086 mm) wheelbase.

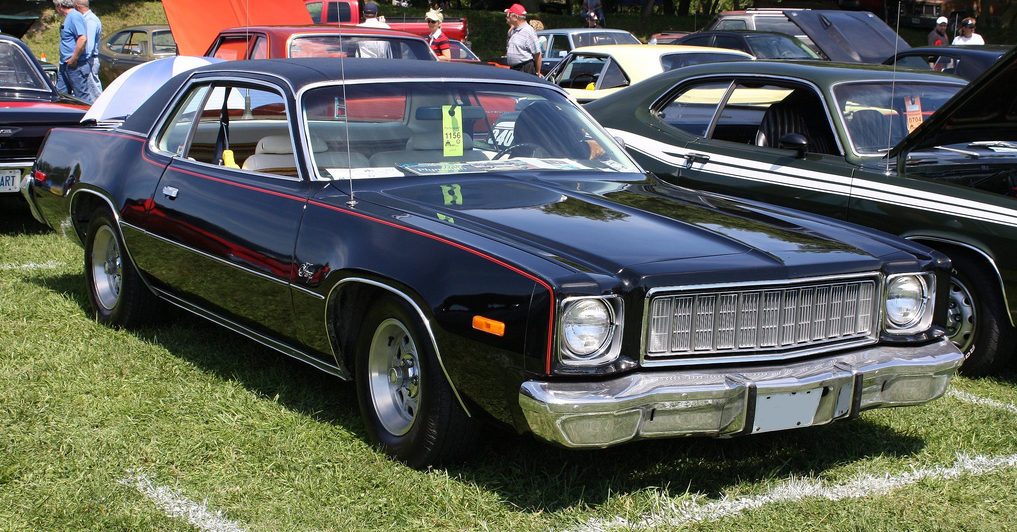
1975 Plymouth Fury 2-Door Hardtop

Fury was offered in three basic subseries for 1975 in sedans and coupes and two for the station wagon. The sedan was offered in base, custom and salon models, with interior and exterior trim ranging from austere to luxurious. The salon featured plush velour bench seats with recliners and folding armrests and carpeted trunks, along with a spring-loaded hood ornament with the Plymouth logo. In addition to the Road Runner, the Fury coupes were offered in base, Custom and Sport models. The "sport" was the top-line coupe featuring body pinstriping on the upper door and front and rear fenders, interiors with all-vinyl bucket seats and center cushion and armrest, or optional center console; or split bench seats with armrest, along with plusher shag carpeting on floor and door panels plus lower door carpeting. The wagons were available as either the Fury Suburban or Fury Custom Suburban.

Engine offerings included the 225 cu in (3.69 L) slant-six that was standard on all models except Fury Sport, Road Runner, and station wagons, which came with the 318 cu in (5.21 L) V8 as the base engine which was optional on other models. Optional engines on all models included 360 cu in (5.9 L) and 400 cu in (6.6 L) V8s with two- or four-barrel carburetor, and the 440 cu in (7.2 L) four-barrel was only as a "police" option on four-door sedans. A three-speed manual transmission was standard with the automatic TorqueFlite optional.

The 1976 model year mid-size B-body 1976 Plymouth Fury saw very few appearance changes from the previous year other than the availability of a dual opera window roof on Sport Fury two-door models. Engine and transmission offerings were also unchanged except that the 360 two-barrel V8 was now the standard engine on station wagons along with the TorqueFlite automatic transmission, both items of which were optional on other models.

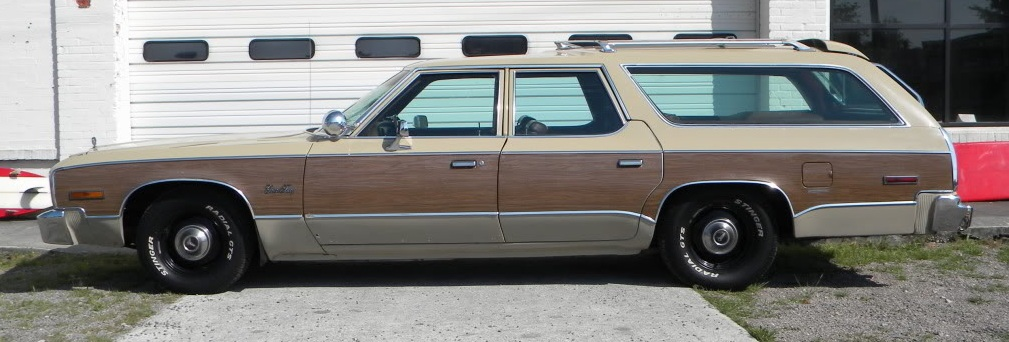
1977 Plymouth Gran Fury Sport Suburban

The 1977 model year mid-size B-body 1977 Plymouth Fury received a new front end with a chrome vertical bar grille and outline along with stacked rectangular headlights. Model and drivetrain offerings were unchanged from 1976 except that the Slant Six now had two-barrel carburetion replacing the one-barrel pot of previous years and was now standard on the Sport Fury two-door models. Optional V8 engines included the 318 two-barrel, 360 two- or four-barrel and 400 two- or four-barrel. The 440 four-barrel V8 was only offered in four-door models as part of the police package.

The 1978 model year was technically a mid-size B-body car, but the 1978 Plymouth Fury was Plymouth's largest car with the discontinuation of the full-size C-body Plymouth Gran Fury after 1977. TorqueFlite automatic transmission and power steering were now standard on all Fury models and the same selection of V8 engines was still available. Few appearance changes were made from the previous model year. The 1978 was the last model year for the Plymouth Fury and its Dodge Monaco counterpart, which was renamed as such during the start of the previous model year (1977), which, in turn, was called the "Dodge Coronet" (1965, 1966, and 1967, from 1968 until 1974, and from 1975 through 1976), while the former full-size C-body Dodge was renamed the "Dodge Royal Monaco" during the start of the previous model year (1977) up until it was discontinued after just one model year. The personal-luxury coupes, which were based on the mid-size B-body platform, including the Chrysler Cordoba and Dodge Magnum (renamed from Charger in 1978) would soldier on for one more year until they were downsized (and renamed Mirada for the Dodge version) in 1980 to the M-body platform used for the Dodge Diplomat and Chrysler LeBaron.

== Gran Fury ==
=== 1980–1981 ===
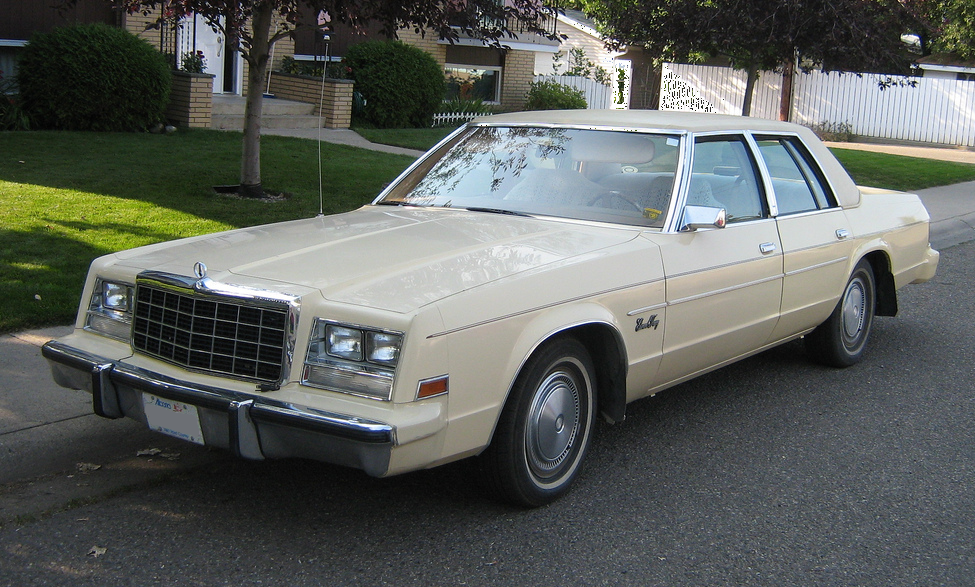
1980–1981 Plymouth Gran Fury

For 1980, Chrysler's venerable B-body chassis/unibody structure was reengineered and restyled into the new R-body full-sized car, which was a considerably downsized replacement of the 1974–78 C-body cars. The R-body included the 1979-1981 Chrysler Newport, Chrysler New Yorker, and Dodge St. Regis The 1980-1981 R-body Gran Fury, although not common in retail sales, did quite well in fleet and government/public safety sales.

=== 1982–1989 ===
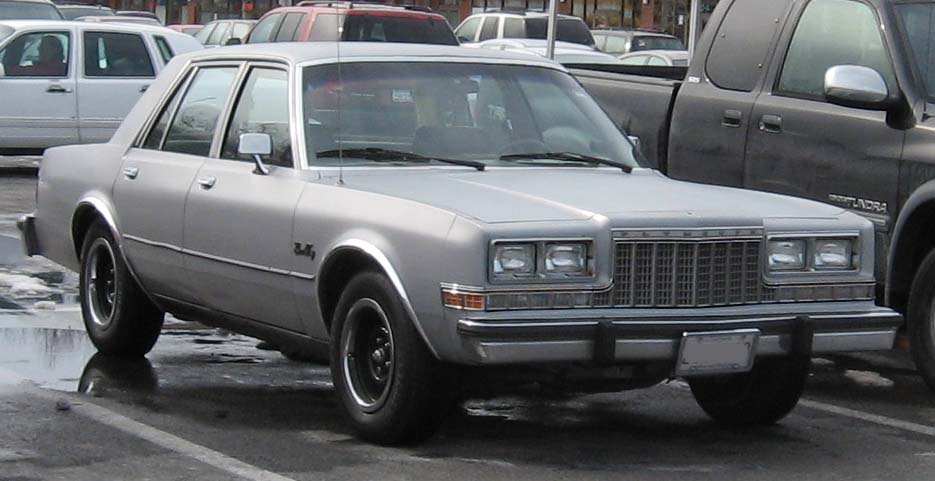
1982–1989 Plymouth Gran Fury

After Chrysler discontinued the R-body halfway through the 1981 model year, they decided to anoint the M-body platform with "full-size" status for 1982. The New Yorker and Gran Fury nameplates were thus assigned to the former LeBaron and Canadian Caravelle models, respectively, for the US market. The Chrysler New Yorker (1982) and New Yorker Fifth Avenue (1983) (renamed Chrysler Fifth Avenue for 1984) shared the Gran Fury and Dodge Diplomat body.

The M-body cars were available through the 1989 model year, and the Gran Fury and Diplomat were very popular choices for police cruisers. Chrysler discontinued the M-body (and L-body) cars in late 1988, midway through the 1989 model year. That brought over 30 years of Plymouth Fury history to an end.

== In popular culture ==
A 1958 Plymouth Fury was the title subject of the 1983 best-selling novel Christine by Stephen King. Later in the same year the book was adapted into a movie of the same name directed by John Carpenter. As the actual Plymouth Fury was not sold in red for the 1958 model year, a number of 1958 Plymouth Belvederes were used for filming instead.

Christine, or another car similar to her, appears mysteriously near the end of the narrative of King's 1986 novel It.

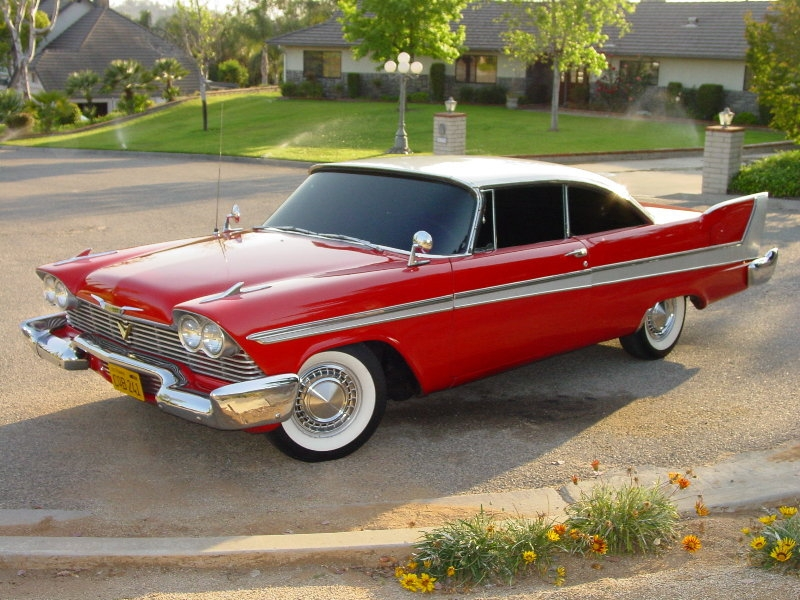
One of the surviving cars that portrayed the eponymous vehicle in Christine

In the television series Leave it to Beaver (S3:E33, "Beaver and Violet"), character Fred Rutherford's 1960 convertible Fury is prominently seen (Plymouth was a sponsor of the show).

== See also ==
- Dodge Monaco
- Dodge Diplomat
- Plymouth Gran Fury
- Dodge Polara
