= Plymouth Suburban =

Station wagon produced from 1949 until 1978

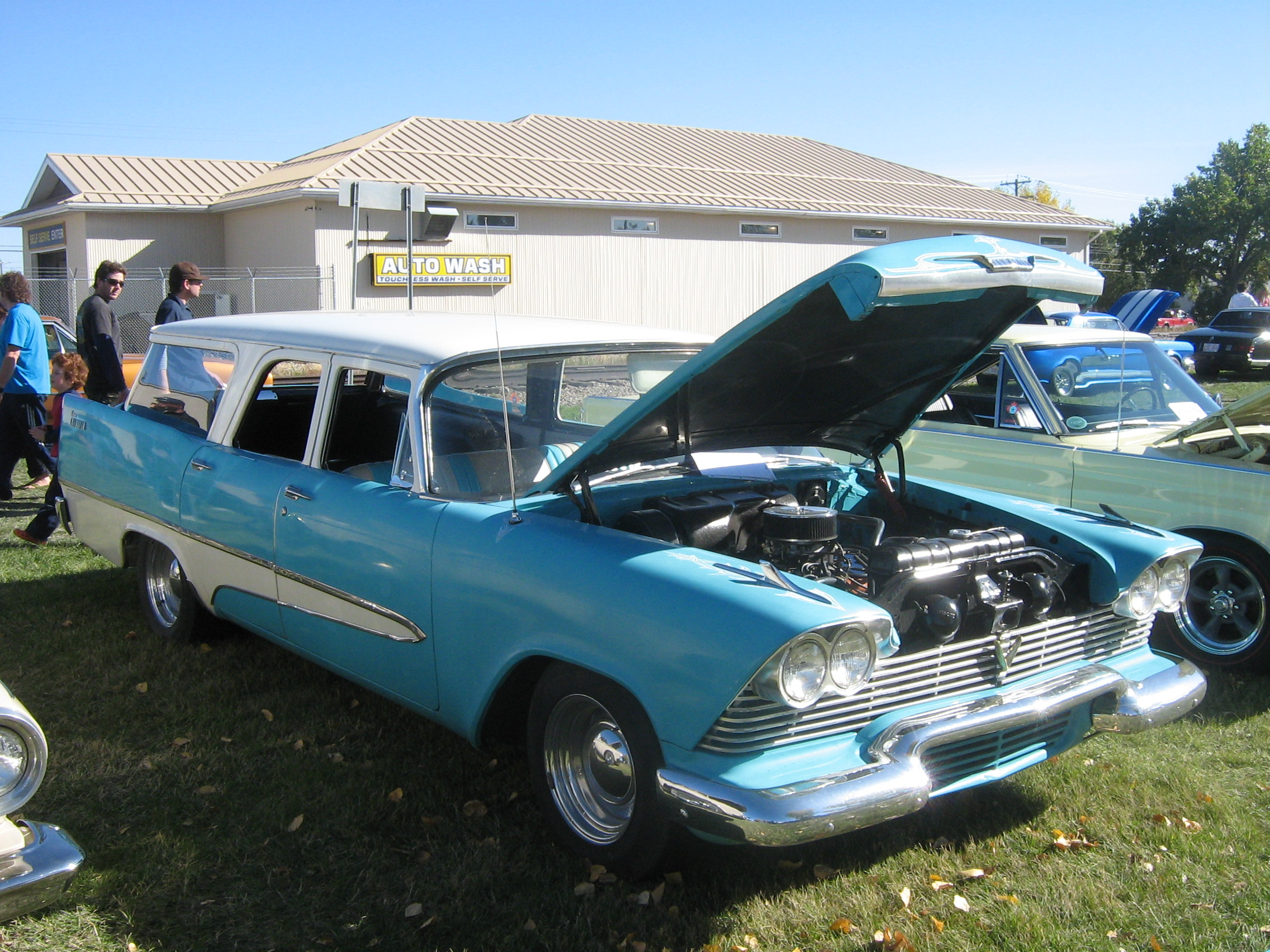
1958 Plymouth Custom Suburban

The Plymouth Suburban is a station wagon produced from 1949 until 1978.

== 1949 to 1955 ==
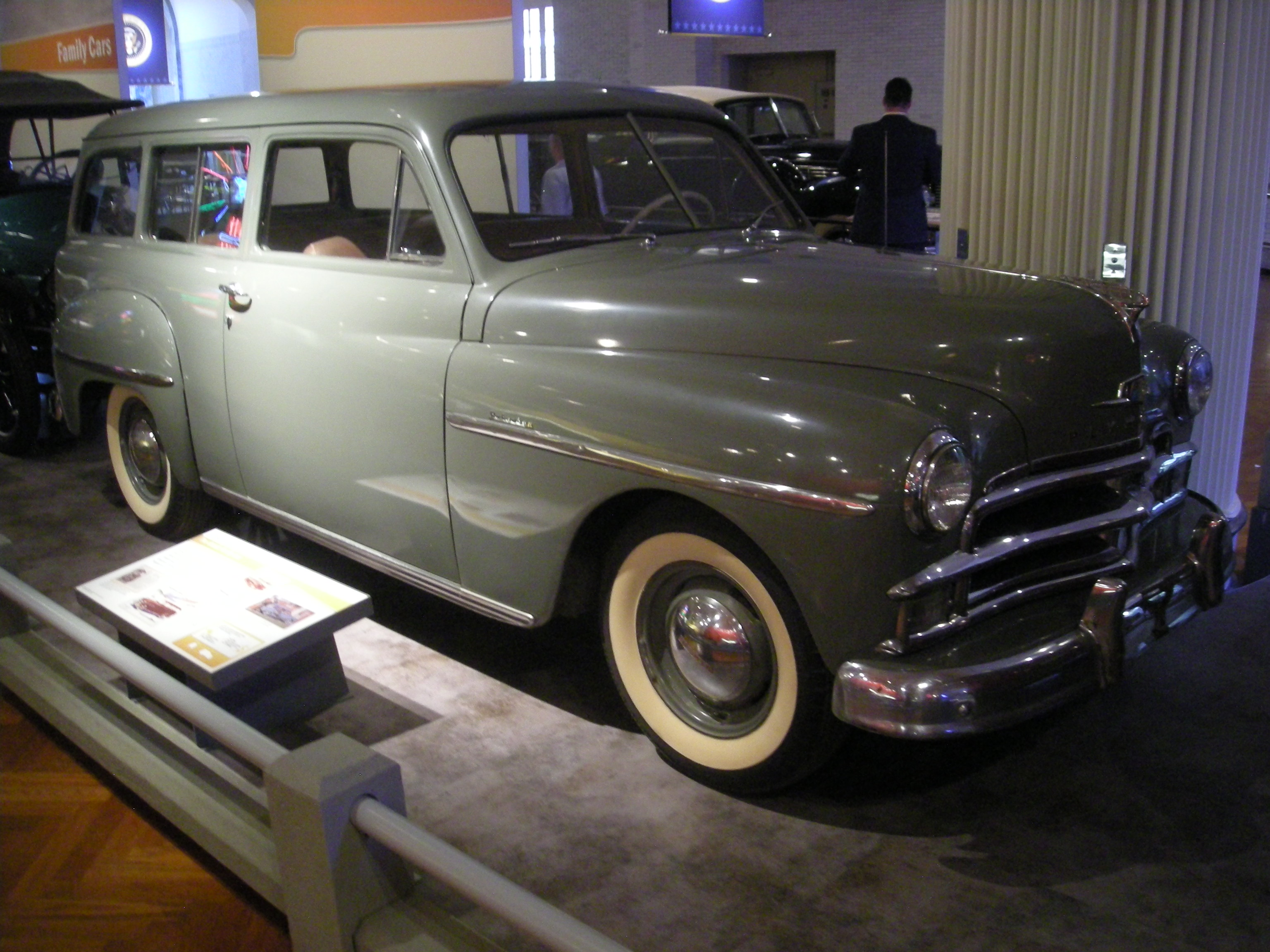
1950 Plymouth DeLuxe Suburban

Prior to 1949, Plymouth had offered only a 4-door "woodie" station wagon, which was expensive not only to build, but also to buy. In 1949, Plymouth revolutionized the US station wagon market by introducing the industry's second all-steel body station wagon, following the Willy’s Overland “Jeep Station Wagon”, which was its direct competition. In addition, for the first time in a low-priced car, automatic "turn-the-key" ignition/starter combination was introduced. The Suburban featured a two-door body (plus tailgate) and seated six. The back row of seating folded flat to allow 42 inches (1,100 mm) of flat floor space, and became popular as a commercial wagon.

The Suburban for 1950 was accompanied by a four-door Special Deluxe wagon, the last of the "woodies", for those wanting something a little more traditional. There were two Plymouth wheelbases, with the Suburban riding on the shorter 111-inch (2,800 mm) platform (the Special Deluxe was 118.5 inches). Vinyl upholstery was used, as this was more hard-wearing for utilitarian use. Motive power was the Chrysler Corporation's smallest six, a 217.8cid L-head that produced 97 bhp at 3,800rpm. The Suburbans rode on 6.40x15 inch Goodyear tyres, though a 6.70x15 inch "Super Cushion" tyre option with higher gearing was offered, as was a high-clearance 18-inch (460 mm) wheel option. A "taxi package" was recommended to owners expecting to carry heavy loads, featuring heavy-duty chassis springs and shock absorbers, a 100 amp/hr battery with a heat shield, and even heavier grade springs in seats and seat backs.

The Suburban continued to 1955 with few changes other than annual styling applications (including a new body in 1953 and again in 1955). New for 1953 was the Hydrive automatic transmission, which was really a manual with a torque converter that eliminated shifting between second and third, sharing lubrication between engine and transmission. The 1954 models benefitted from a power upgrade to 117 bhp from the ageing L-head six, as well as an optional two-speed "Power-Flite" automatic. In 1955 Plymouth introduced a range of V8 engines, extending the power plant range to a 117 bhp 230 cid L-head six, a polyspherical-head 157 bhp 241 cid V8, a 167 bhp 260 cid V8, and a 177 bhp 260 cid V8 (with 4bbl carbs), the former two of which were available for the Suburban. All-new Virgil Exner styling and a good year for all manufacturers, contributed to Plymouth's best year ever of 705,455 cars.

== 1956-1961: Separate series ==
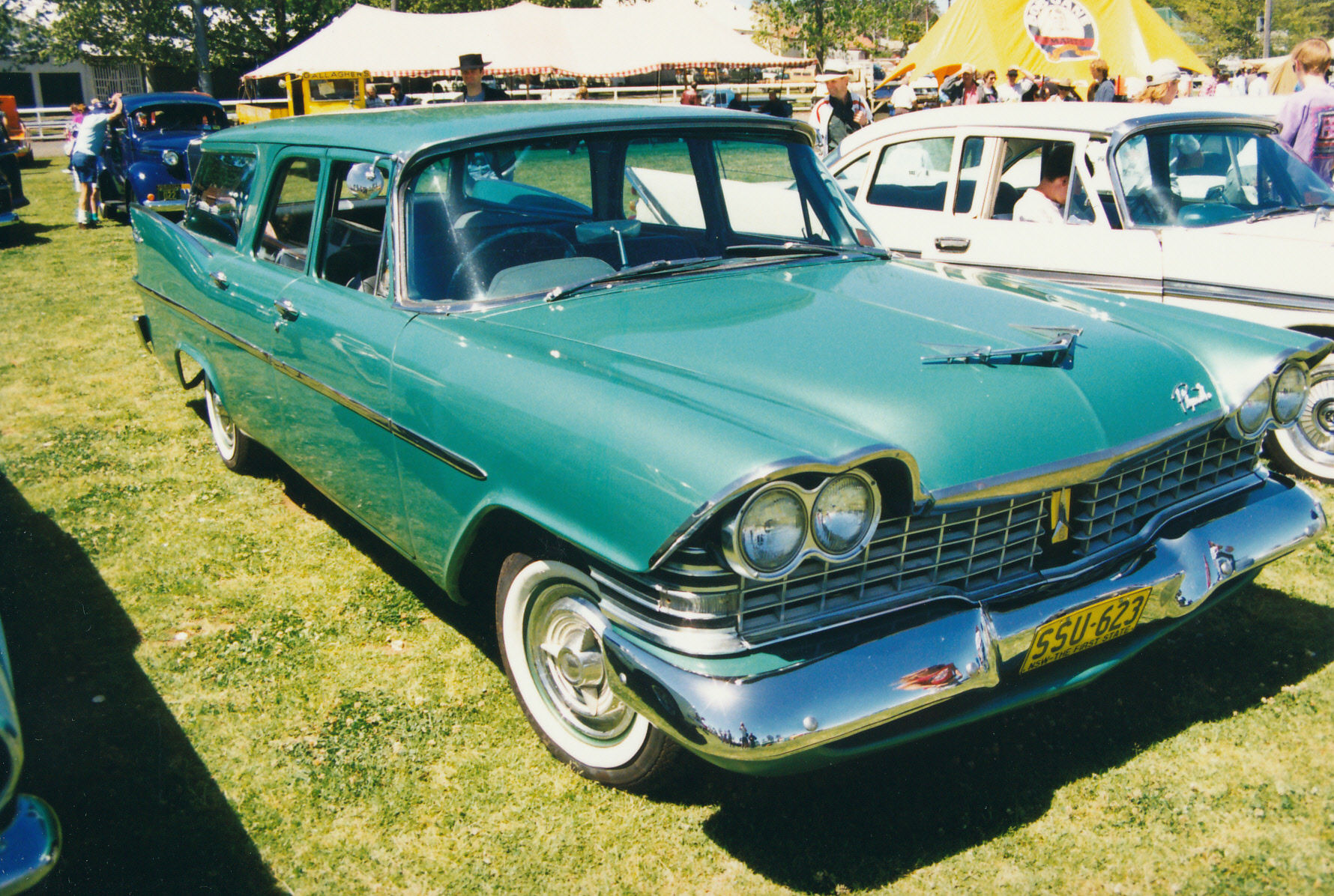
1959 Plymouth DeLuxe Suburban 4-door

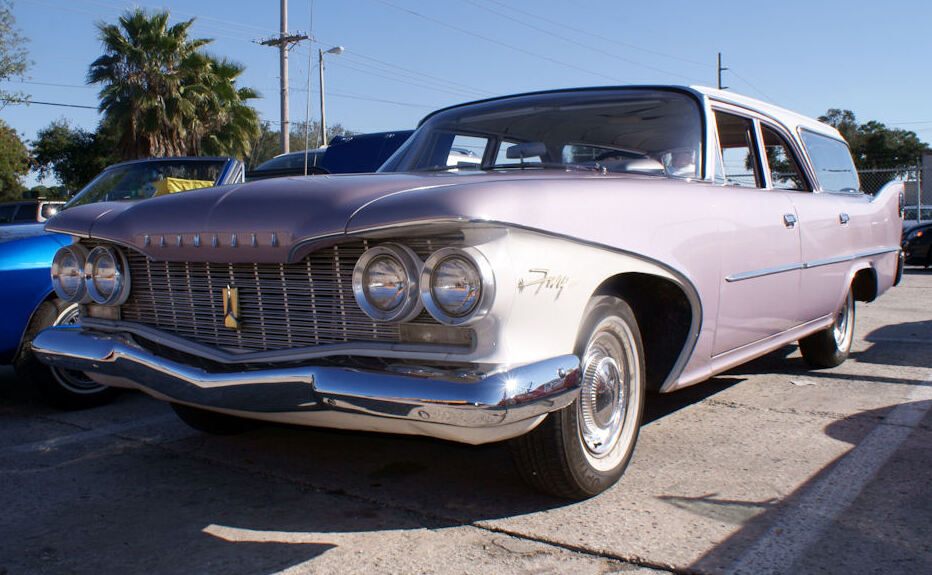
1960 Plymouth Sport Suburban

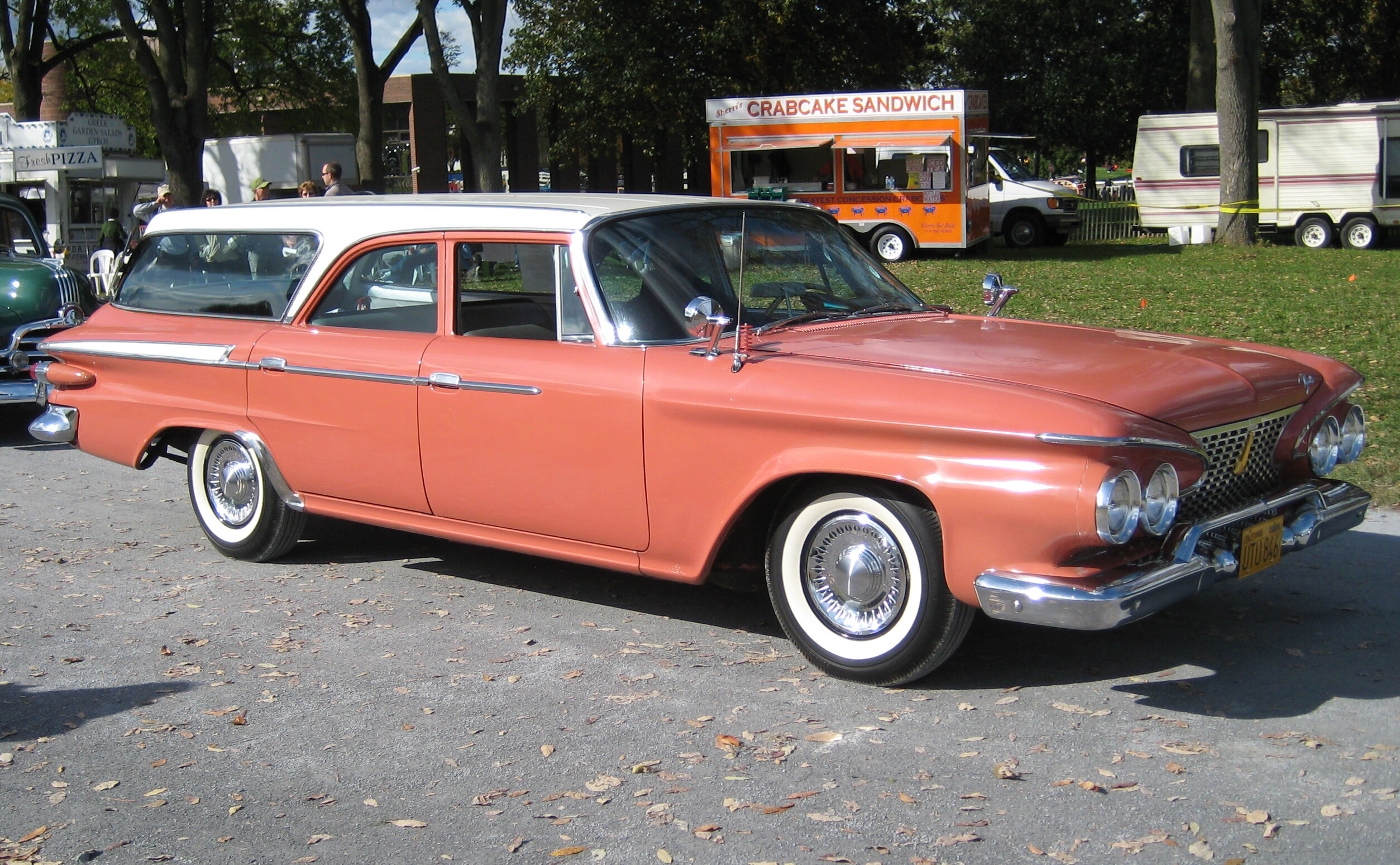
1961 Plymouth Suburban

For 1956, the Plymouth station wagons were grouped in their own separate series instead of being a part of the standard range of models (the Deluxe in 1950, the Concord in 1951-1952, the Cambridge for 1954 and the Plaza and Belvedere in 1955). The 1956 wagon range comprised the De Luxe Suburban 2-Door, the Custom Suburban 2-Door, the Custom Suburban 4-Door and the Sport Suburban 4-Door with De Luxe Suburban, Custom Suburban and Sport Suburban models equating to the Plymouth Plaza, Savoy and Belvedere models respectively.

The 1956 models came with more V8 power upgrades, up to 180 bhp 270cid V8, 187 bhp 277cid V8, 200 bhp 277cid V8, with a 240 bhp 303cid V8 for the Fury. Tail fins featured for the first time, in what Exner christened the "Forward Look". A 1956 Suburban can be discerned from a 1955 Suburban by the grille center section - 1955 models had a ribbed center section, with a chrome V badge on the hood identifying a V8 engine. The V was moved down into the grille center for 1956 models and block P-L-Y-M-O-U-T-H lettering appeared on the hood front. The 1956 tail lamps were larger.

A new body arrived in 1957, again by Exner. So modern was the design in comparison to the 1956, that Plymouth's ad men proclaimed "Suddenly it's 1960!". Styling on both Suburbans (and the entire line) was cleaner, without the hugely ornate grille castings Plymouths had worn before. The sedans rode on a 118-inch (3,000 mm) wheelbase, and the wagons were 122 inches (3,100 mm). The Suburban was a separate model line in its own right.

Separating the wagons from the other lines was done to limit confusion when ordering parts. Station wagons were growing in popularity, but never matched sedans in volume. Hence there were certain compromises made over the years by all manufacturers. Ford was known to sell Mercury wagons on the shorter Ford wheelbase, particularly in the Comet and Meteor series, and Oldsmobile, Buick and Pontiac Bonneville full size wagons all shared Chevrolet's 119 inch wheelbase for a time (unlike the sedans and coupes on their 123.5 inch wheelbase). Chrysler reversed this. Preferring to maintain the exclusive nature of the Town & Country, the company based all wagons on the larger bodies and smoother suspensions of the senior divisions. This made it difficult for Plymouth to compete in price with Ford and Chevrolet, but did allow them to claim the roomiest wagon in the low-priced field. It also meant the wagons used many parts shared with Chryslers, DeSotos and Dodges, but not other Plymouths. The unique name meant Plymouth dealers were limited in liability; when a mechanic found his new torsion bar was inches too short to fit, he had no one but himself to blame for requesting a Belvedere part instead of a Sport Suburban part.

Suburbans for 1958 were quite similar to those sold in '57, but with detail changes like an under-bumper grille and a V in the grille center. The P-L-Y-M-O-U-T-H lettering was gone again, replaced by a hood emblem. The rear vision mirror was mounted on the dashboard moved off center toward the driver's side. The old L-head six was available (though not much longer) and there were now three "Dual Fury" V8s; 225 bhp, 250 bhp (4bbl) and 290 bhp (8bbl), as well as a 350cid "Golden Commando" option.

Although based on the same body, 1959 Plymouth Suburbans featured an 'egg-crate' grille and side trim changes, while the front bumper lost its raised center section and larger tail lamps set the 1958s apart from the rear.

Unitary construction was the song being sung of the 1960 Plymouth range. Styling changes included a flat hood from fender to fender, and more pronounced tail fins tacked on the rear. The P-L-Y-M-O-U-T-H lettering returned, along the front of the hood, and a short side flash (for two-toning purposes) finished just after the front wheel arches. A 225cid "Slant Six" replaced the old L-head six - this came from development of the new Valiant V-200 series 'compact' cars.

In 1961, a year "most beholders would agree...it was hit with the ugly stick", it was available in six models: one two-door and five four-doors, selling at between US$2,604 for the base two-door (style number 255) and US$3,136 for the top four-door (style number 377). It ran on a 122 in (3,100 mm) wheelbase, measured 215 in (550 cm) long, 80 in (200 cm) wide, and 55.4 in (141 cm) high, with standard 7.5 by 14 in (19 by 36 cm) wheels (8 by 14 in (20 by 36 cm) were optional) and blackwall tires. It had a cargo capacity of 95.8 ft^{3} (2,710 L), with 21 US gal (17 imp gal; 79 L) fuel, and weighed between 3,675 lb (1,667 kg) (for the two-door) and 3,995 lb (1,812 kg) (for the top four-door). It was available with the 225 cu in (3.7 L) Slant Six or 318 cu in (5.2 L) Fury (single four-barrel carburetor), 318 cu in (5.2 L) Super Fury 318 cu in (5.2 L) (dual four-barrel carburetors), 361 cu in (5.9 L) Golden Commando, or 383 cu in (6.3 L) SonoRamic Commando V8. Either three-speed manual or TorqueFlite automatic transmission were available. It was aimed at the Chevrolet Impala/Biscayne, Ford Galaxie, and up-market AMC Ambassador.

The separate Suburban series was discontinued for 1962, and the new and now smaller Plymouth station wagon models were instead included within the Savoy, Belvedere and Fury lines. However, the body for the 1961 4-door wagon was held over so that it could be used in the creation of the full-sized Chrysler and Dodge wagons for 1962. The 1962 model Chrysler wagons were created by mating their respective front ends to the updated body of the 1961 Plymouth wagon. Similarly, the Dodge Custom 880 also mated its 1962 front end to the 1961 Plymouth wagon body. The 1961 Plymouth body was utilized because it was the only finless full-sized Chrysler Corporation wagon. The full-sized Chrysler and Dodge wagons would continue to employ this strategy of using updated 1961 Plymouth wagon bodies up through the 1964 model year.

== 1968-1978: Fury Suburban ==
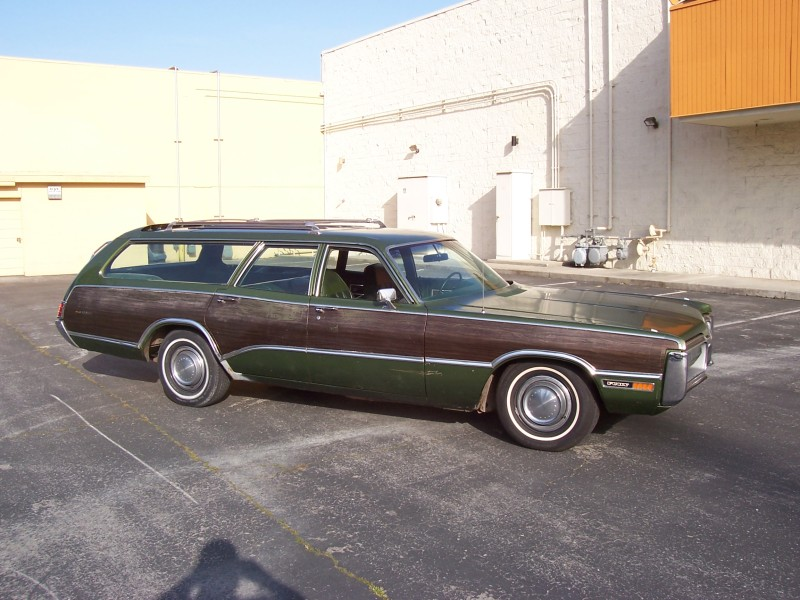
1972 Plymouth Fury Sport Suburban

For 1968, Suburban Wagon, Custom Suburban Wagon and Sport Suburban Wagon models were offered as part of the Plymouth Fury range.

== See also ==
- DeSoto Suburban
- Chevrolet Suburban
