= Plymouth Savoy =

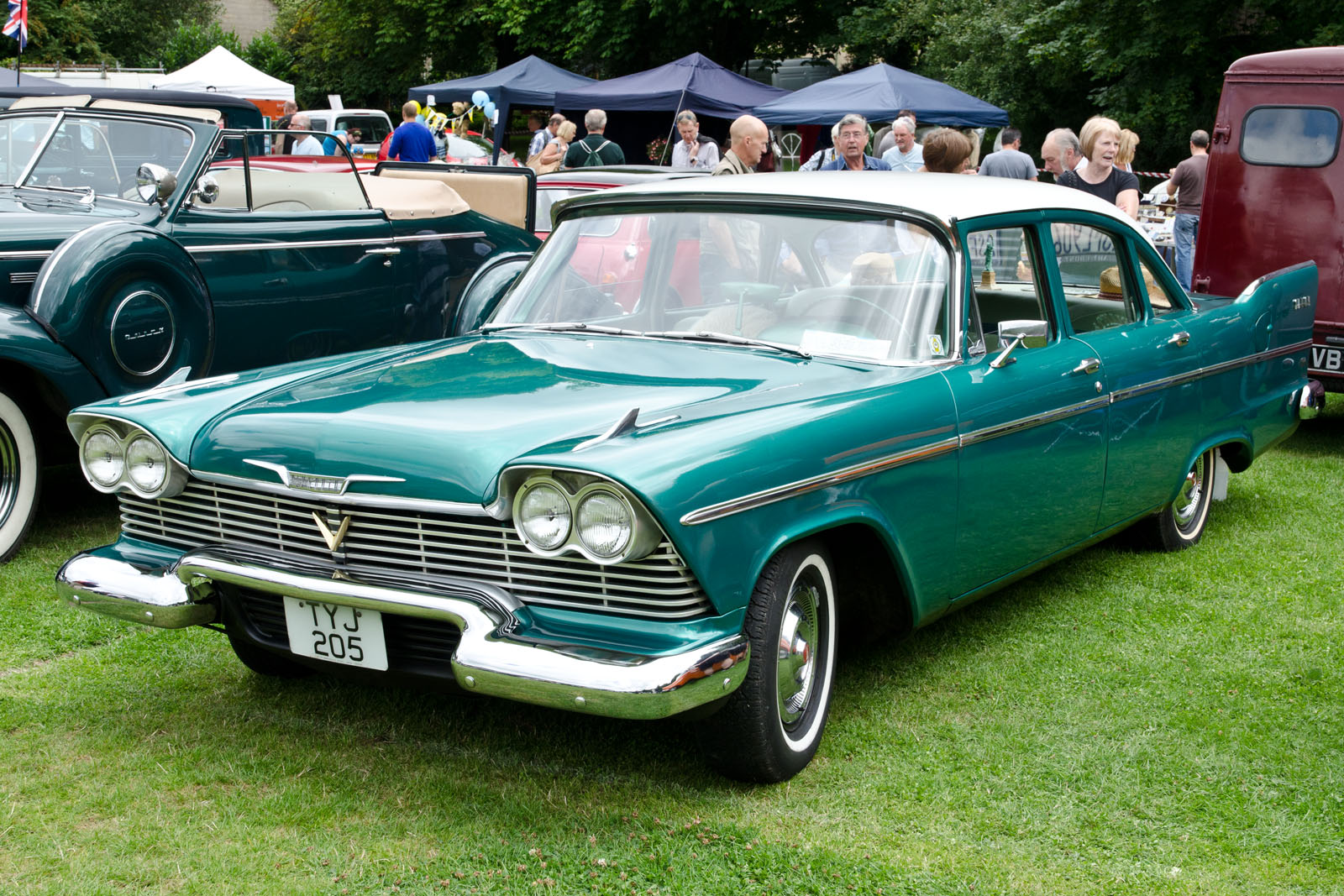
- 1958 Plymouth Savoy 4-door Sedan

Overview
- Manufacturer: Plymouth (Chrysler)
- Also called: Dodge Kingsway (Canada)
- Production: 1954–1964 (1965 in Canada)
- Assembly: United States: Detroit, Michigan (Lynch Road Assembly); United States: Newark, Delaware (Newark Assembly); Australia: Mile End (Chrysler Australia); Canada: Windsor, Ontario (Windsor Assembly); India: Mumbai (Premier Automobiles); Mexico: Mexico City (Lago Alberto Assembly); New Zealand: Petone (Todd Motors)

Body and chassis
- Class: Full size (1954–1961); Mid-size (1962–1964)
- Layout: FR layout

The Plymouth Savoy is an automobile which was produced in the 1951 through 1964 model years by Plymouth.

As with Plymouth's Plaza and Belvedere models, the Savoy was named after an upscale hotel, the Savoy Hotel in London.

== 1951–1953 ==
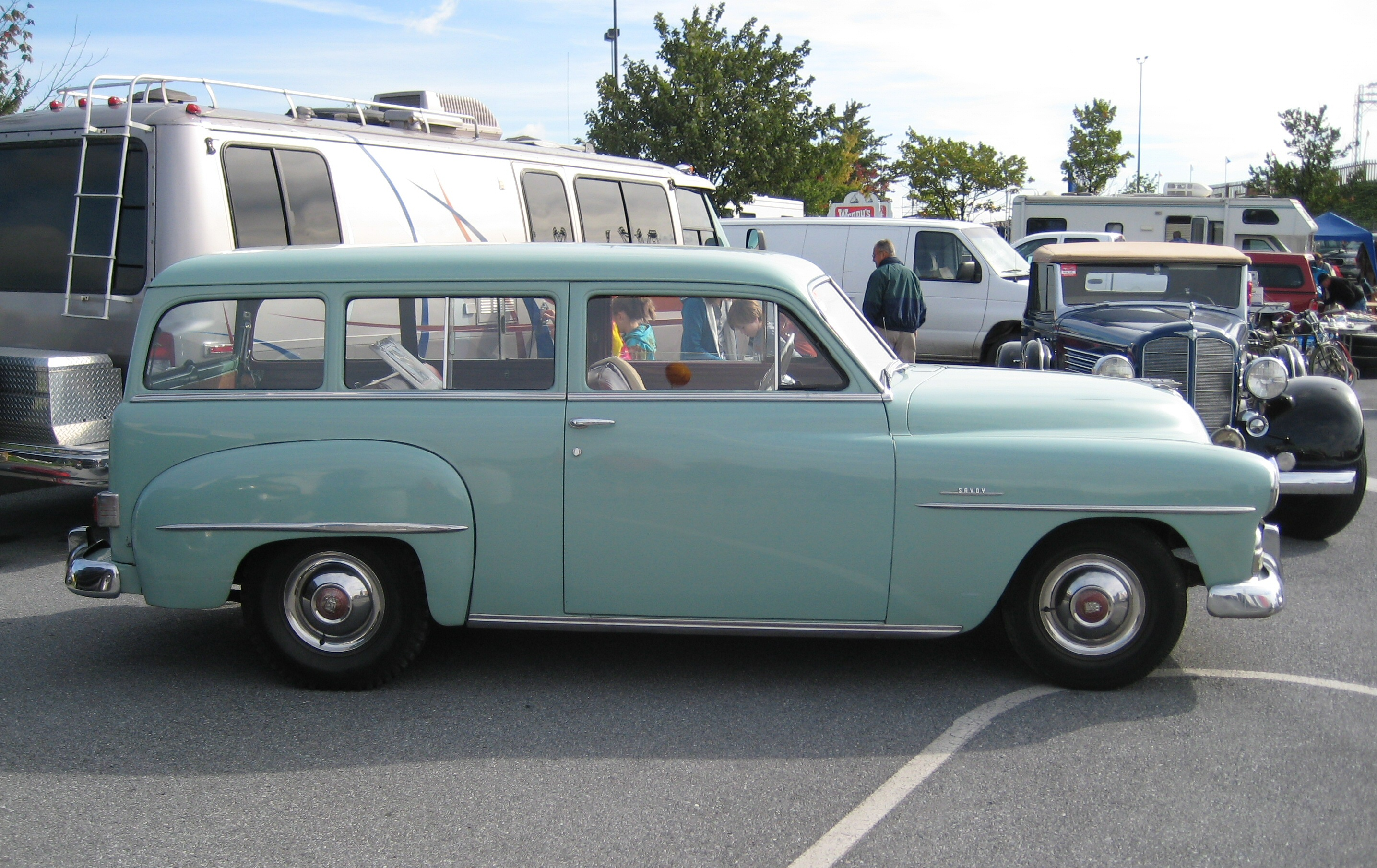
1951 Plymouth Savoy Wagon

Plymouth used the name Savoy as a trim package from 1951 to 1953, as an upgrade of the base model Suburban station wagon.

== 1954 ==
First generation
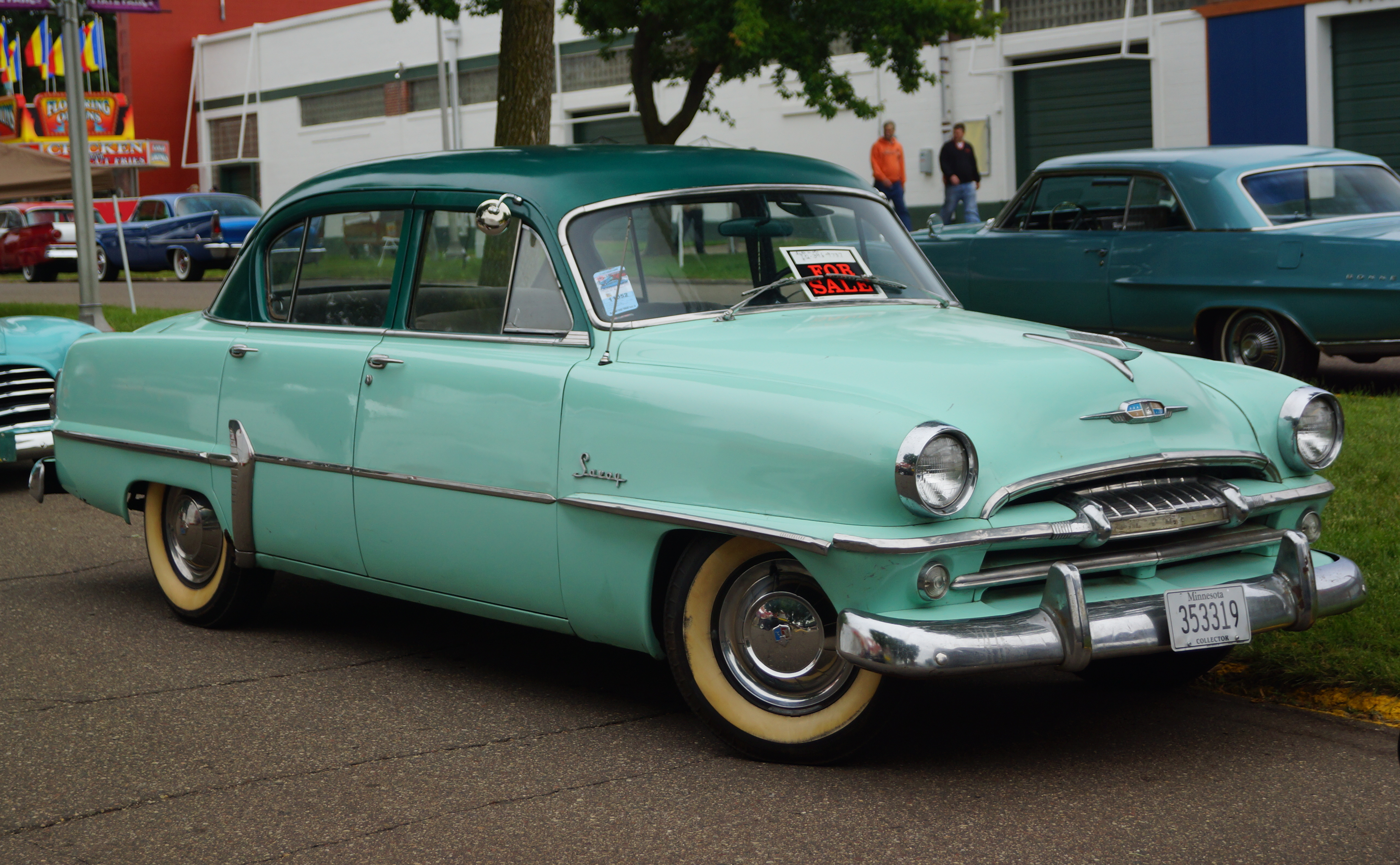
- 1954 Plymouth Savoy four door sedan

Overview
- Model years: 1954

Body and chassis
- Body style: 2-door sedan; 4-door sedan; 2-door Club Coupe; 2-door coupé utility (Australia)
- Related: Plymouth Plaza; Plymouth Belvedere

Powertrain
- Engine: 217.8 cu in (3.6 L) PD sv I6 (early); 230.2 cu in (3.8 L) PD sv I6 (late)
- Transmission: 3-speed manual; 3-speed manual with overdrive; 2-speed automatic

Dimensions
- Wheelbase: 114.0 in (2,896 mm)
- Length: 193.5 in (4,915 mm)
- Width: 74.25 in (1,886 mm)

When introduced in 1954, later in the year with 1955 model paint schemes, the Savoy was Plymouth's mid-level car and priced between the base Plaza sedans and the top-line Belvedere models. Midway through the model year (on February 26), the engine's stroke was increased by a quarter inch, increasing displacement from 217.8 to 230.2 cu in (3.6 to 3.8 L) and increasing power from 100 to 110 hp (75 to 82 kW).

In 1954, the Savoy was available as a two-door Club Coupe, four-door sedan, and 2-door Club Sedan.

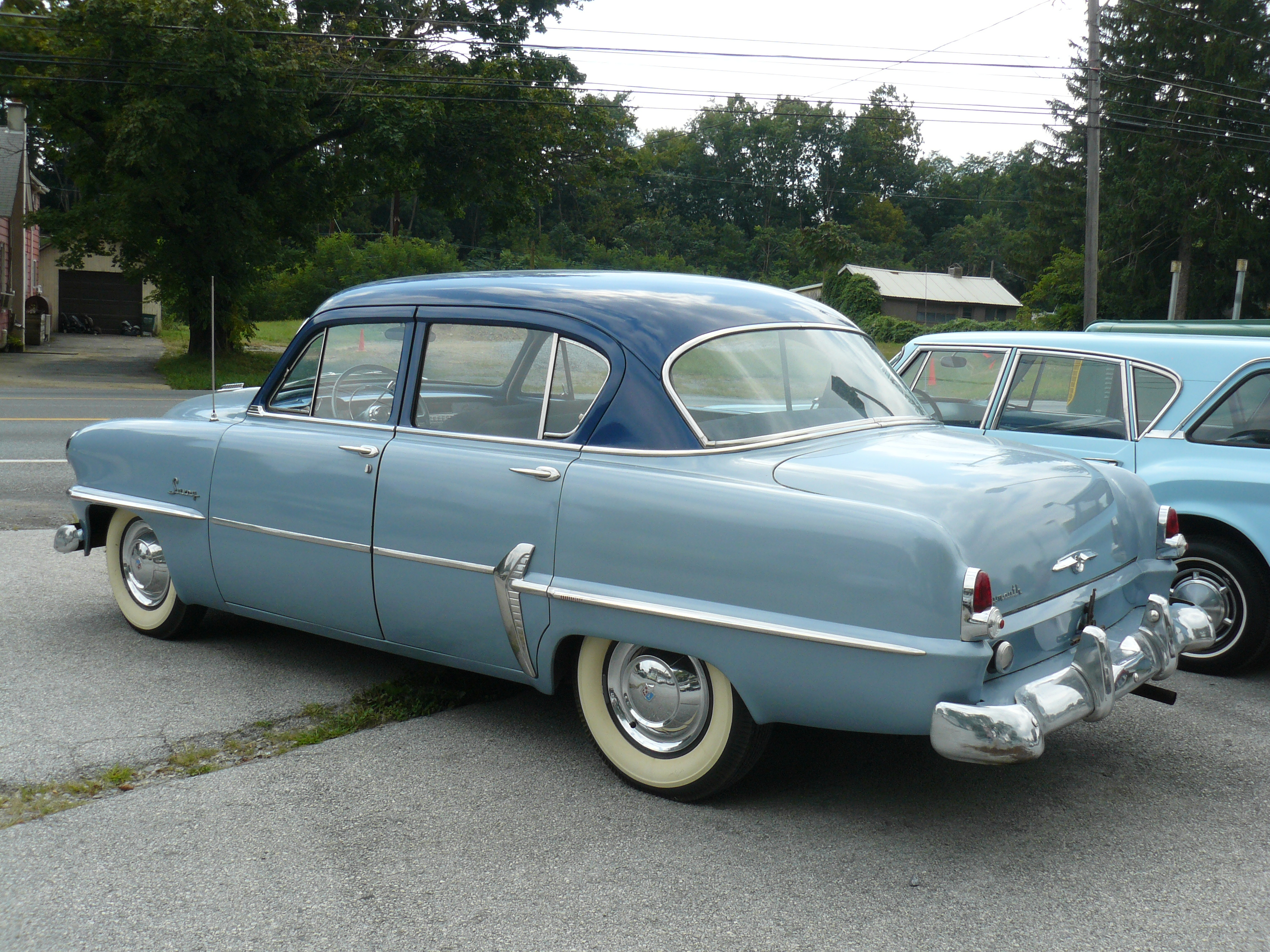
1954 Plymouth Savoy Sedan rear view

== 1955–1956 ==
Second generation
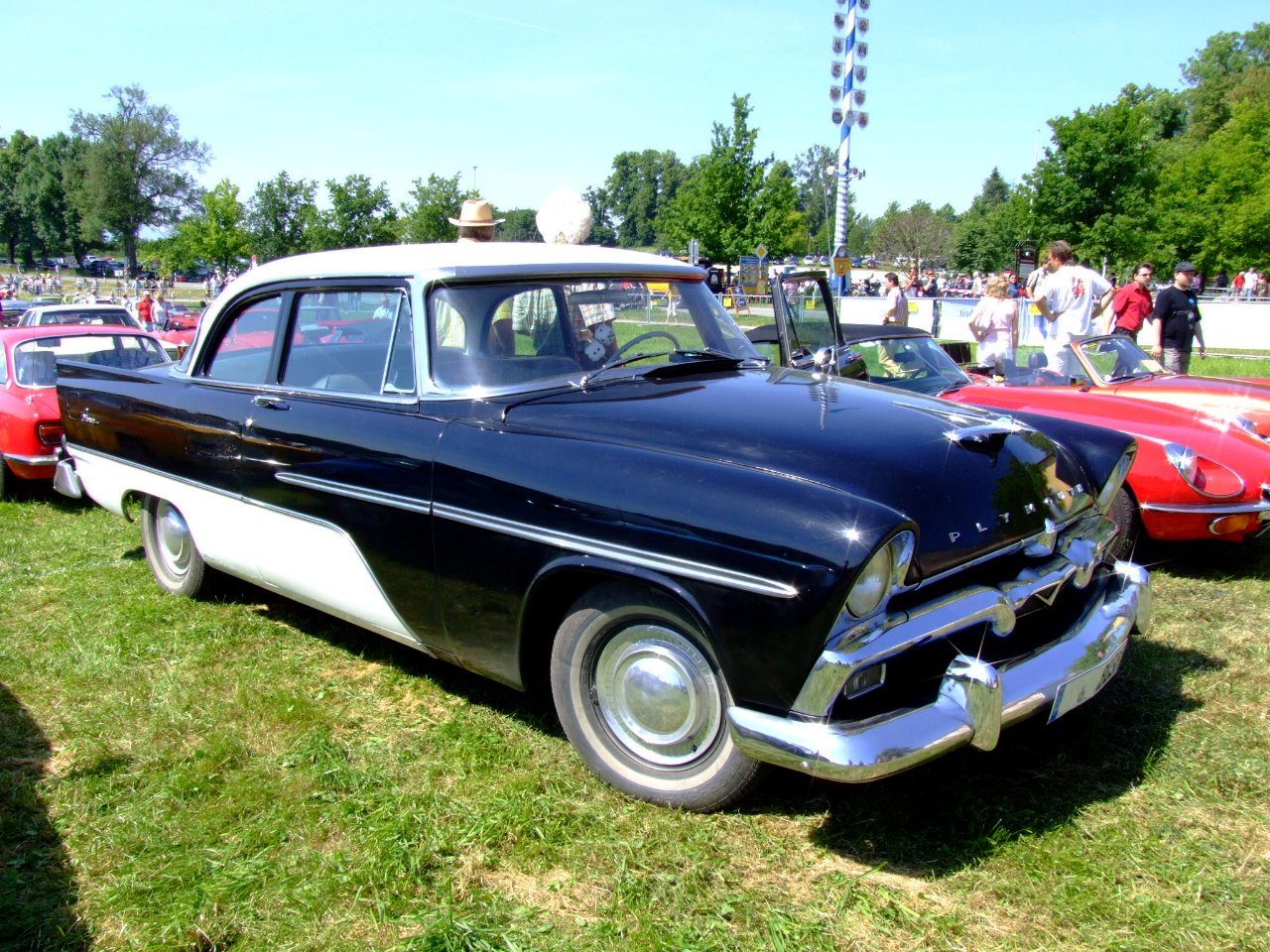
- 1956 Plymouth Savoy 2-door club sedan

Overview
- Model years: 1955–1956

Body and chassis
- Body style: 2-door coupe 2-door hardtop 4-door sedan 4-door hardtop 4-door station wagon
- Related: Dodge Coronet; Plymouth Belvedere; Plymouth Plaza; Plymouth Fury (1956 only)

Powertrain
- Engine: 225 cu in (3.7 L) I6; 270 cu in (4.4 L) V8; 301 cu in (4.9 L) V8; 318 cu in (5.2 L) V8; 383 cu in (6.3 L) V8; 361 cu in (5.9 L) V8; 395 cu in (6.5 L) V8
- Transmission: 2-speed automatic 3-speed manual 3-speed automatic

Dimensions
- Wheelbase: 115.0 in (2,921 mm)
- Length: 203.8 in (5,177 mm)

For 1955 through 1956 The Plymouth Savoy was positioned in between the base Plaza and the high end Belvedere

In 1955, the Savoy was available with new power steering.

In 1956, the line added a hardtop coupe and the Custom Suburban station wagon.

In 1956, seat belts were added for safety. The Highway Hi-Fi record player was also optional.

A promotional video was produced by Chrysler, where the 1955-1956 Plymouth models were built on the assembly line at Lynch Road Assembly.

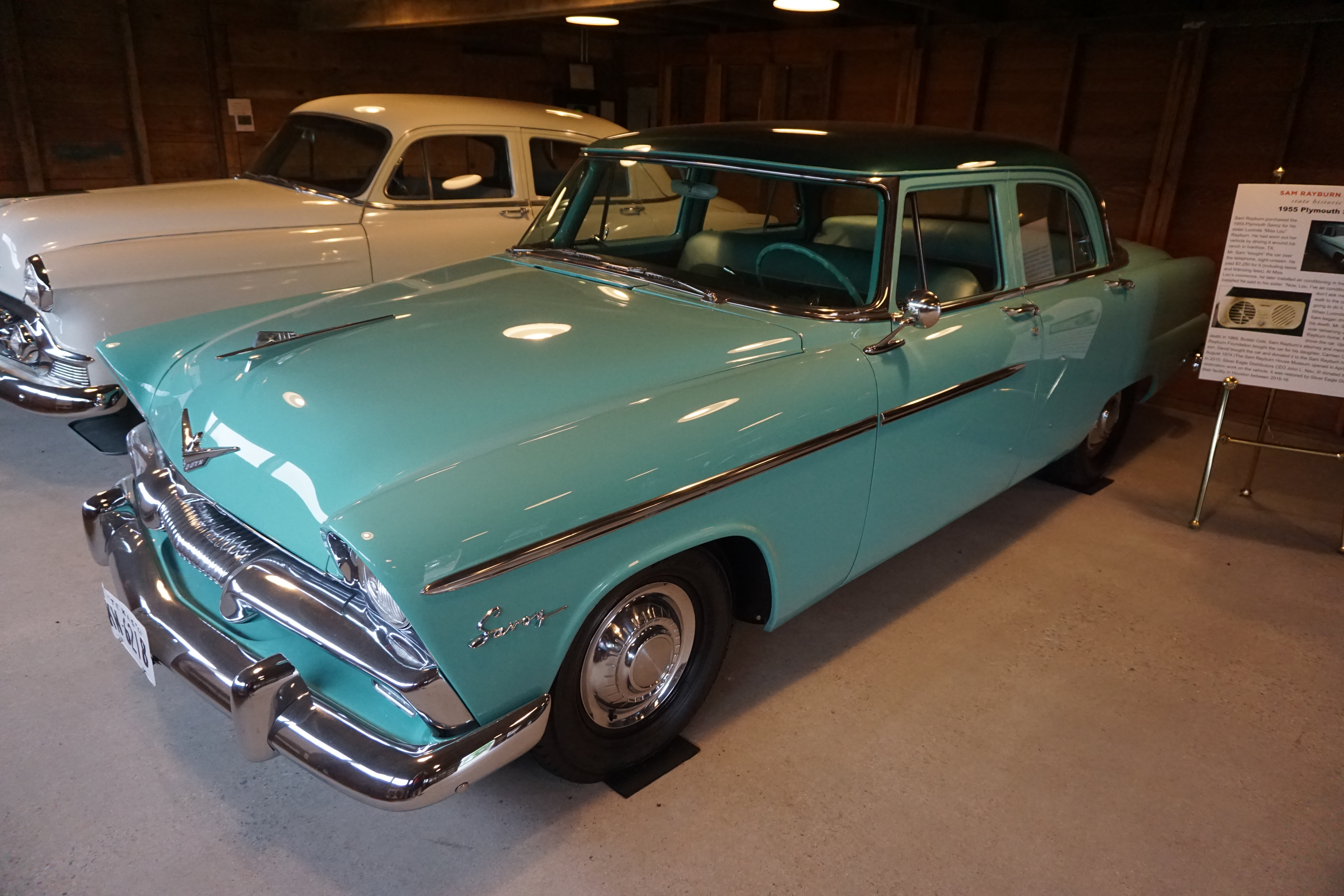
1955 Plymouth Savoy 4-Door Sedan

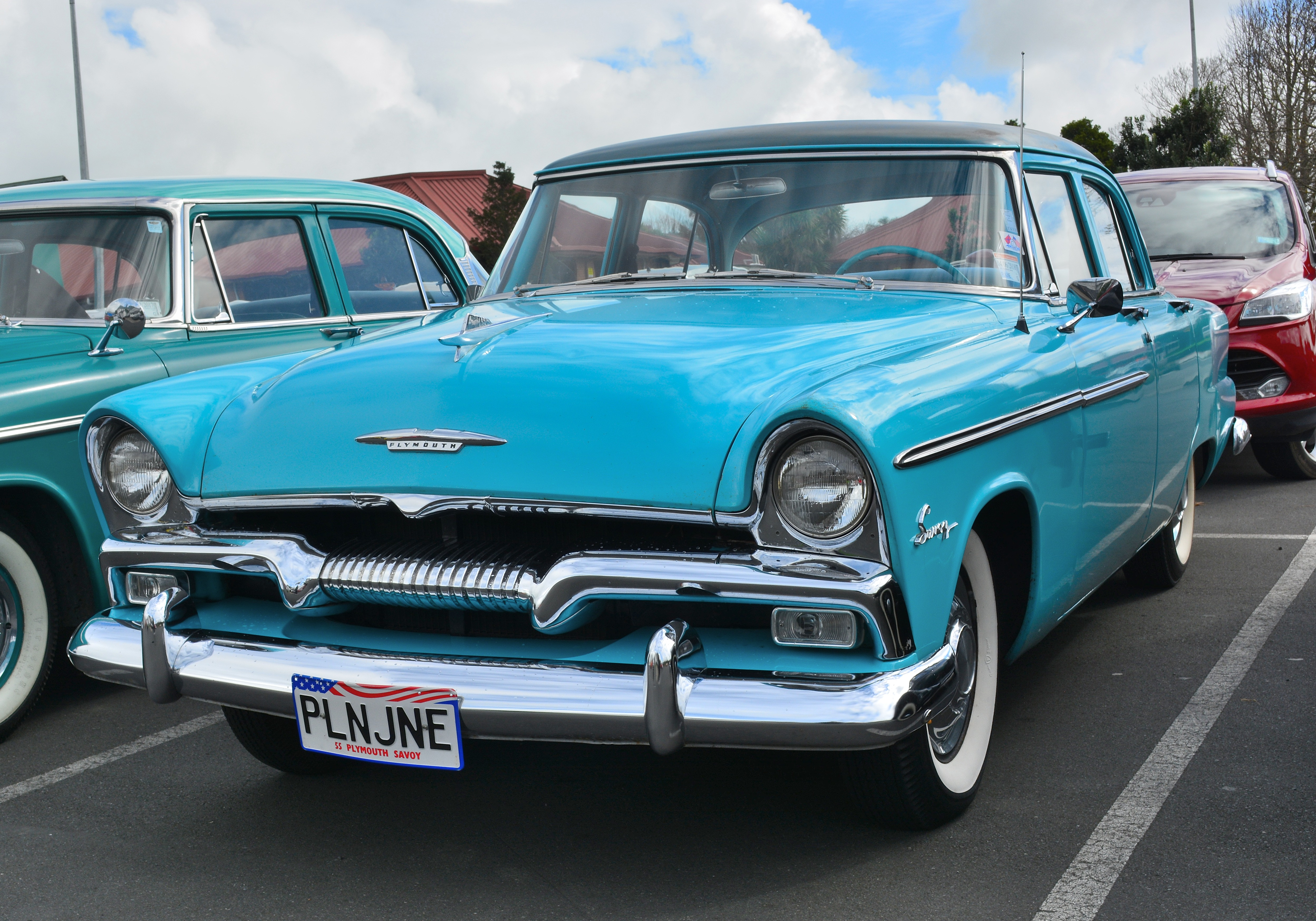
1955 Plymouth Savoy Four-Door Sedan

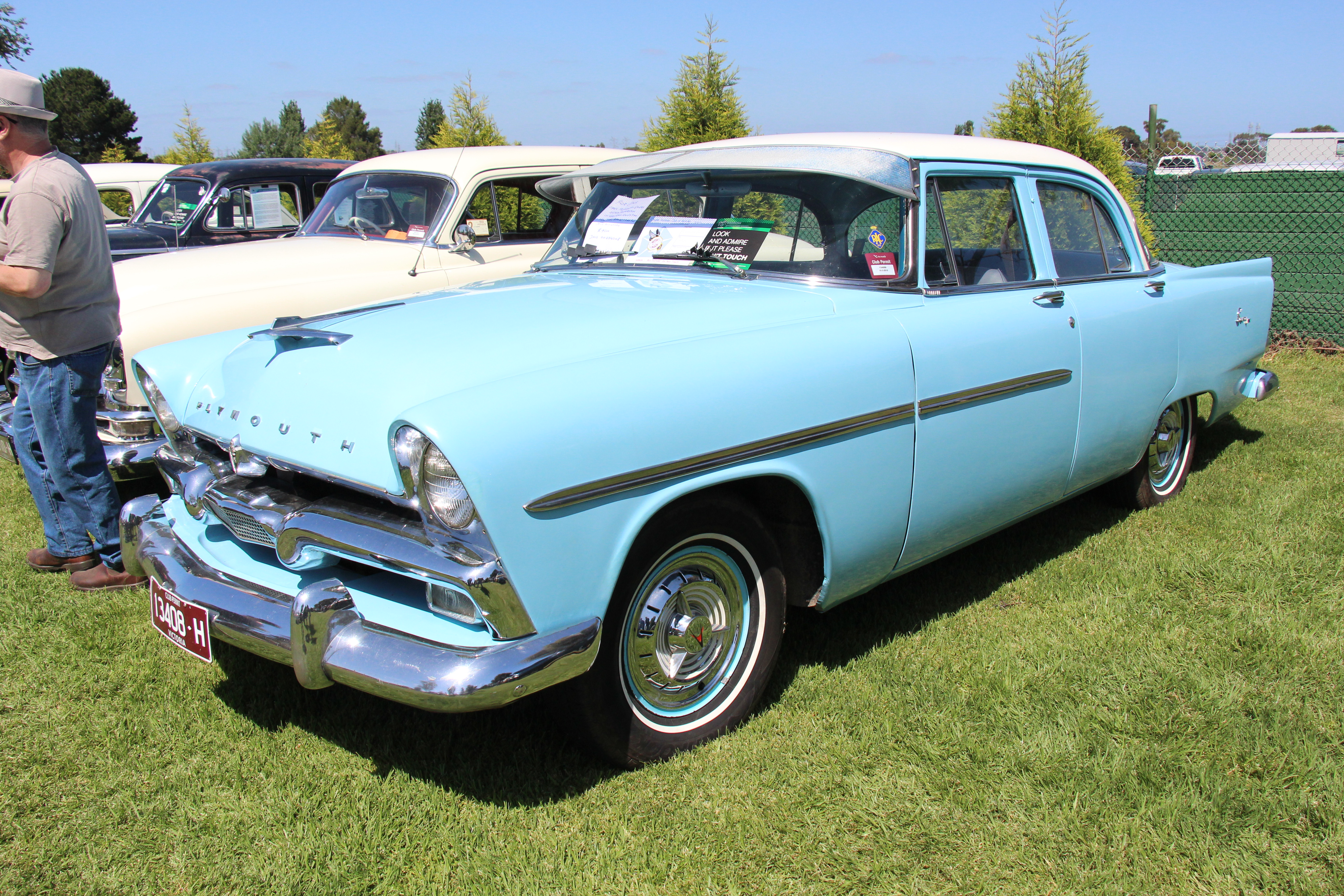
1956 Plymouth Savoy 4-door sedan

== 1957–1959 ==
Third generation
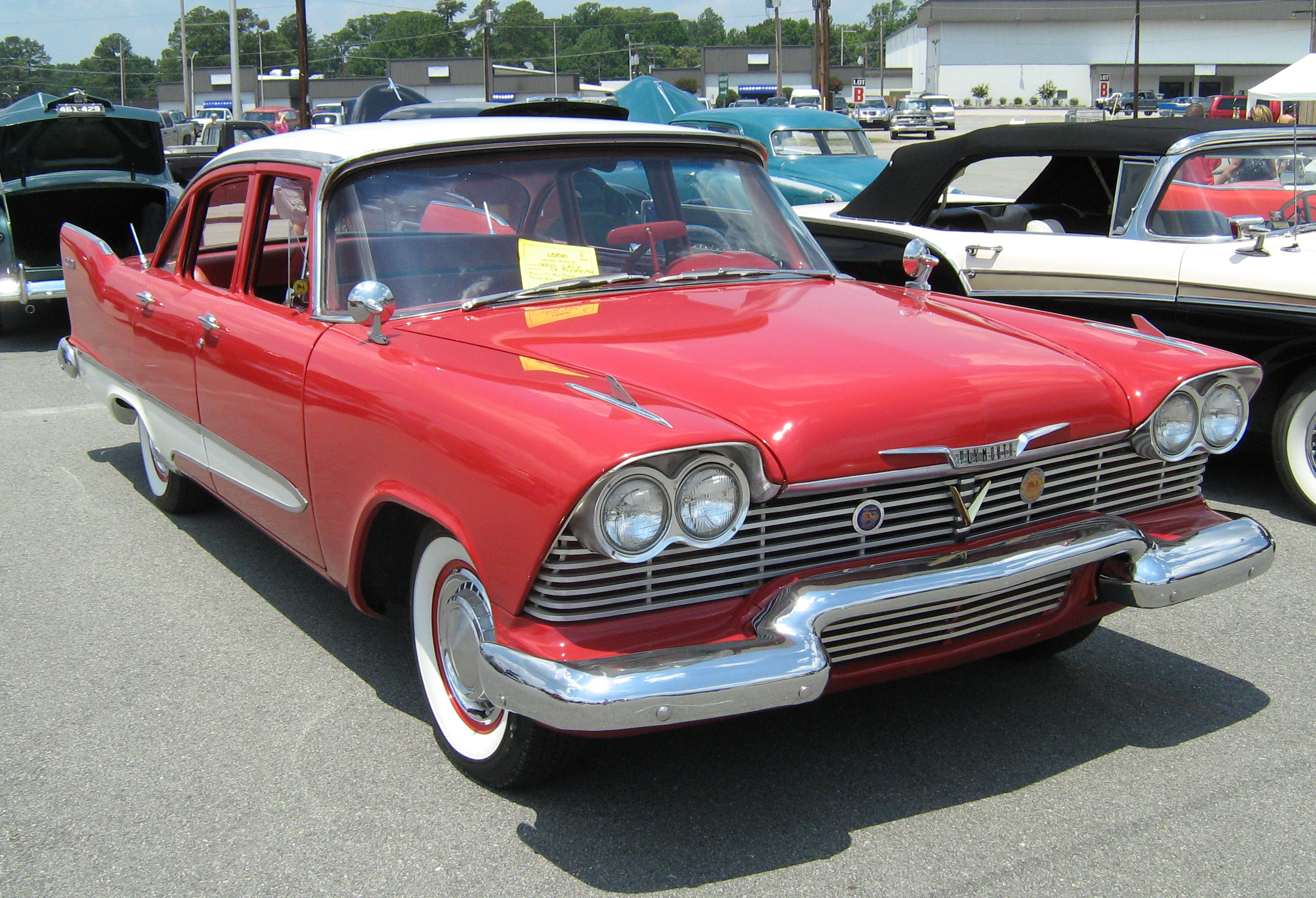
- 1958 Plymouth Savoy 4-door Sedan (with 'Sport Tone' side trim)

Overview
- Model years: 1957–1959

Body and chassis
- Body style: 2-door coupe 2-door hardtop 4-door sedan 4-door hardtop 4-door station wagon
- Related: DeSoto Firedome; Dodge Coronet; Plymouth Belvedere; Plymouth Plaza

Powertrain
- Engine: 192 cu in (3.1 L) Diesel I4; 230.2 cu in (3.8 L) I6; 241 cu in (3.9 L) V8; 260 cu in (4.3 L) V8; 273 cu in (4.5 L) V8; 301 cu in (4.9 L) V8; 318 cu in (5.2 L) V8
- Transmission: 2-speed automatic 3-speed manual 3-speed automatic

Dimensions
- Wheelbase: station wagons: 122.0 in (3,099 mm) all others: 118.0 in (2,997 mm)
- Length: 208.2 in (5,288 mm)
- Width: 78 in (1,981 mm)
- Height: 54.6 in (1,387 mm) (4-Door Hardtop); 56.6 in (1,438 mm) (Sedan); 54.0 in (1,372 mm) (2-Door Hardtop); 54.8 in (1,392 mm) (Convertible)

The Savoy was an upscale trim of the Suburban station wagon in 1957.

For the 1957 and 1958 model years, the line added a four-door hardtop sedan.

In 1959, Plymouth dropped the Plaza and replaced it with the Savoy, making the Savoy the model's entry-level full-size Plymouth. The two hardtop models were dropped, as well as the side trim and interior appointments. Sales were not diminished as the Savoy became vehicles used by taxicab companies, police departments, and other fleet customers. The model was also available to customers who were in the market for a low-cost, economical vehicle with the availability of a V8 engine and automatic transmission, and the roominess of a full-size vehicle. By 1960, a new model, the Plymouth Taxi Special, was spun off from the Savoy. Front leg room was 45.5 inches (116 cm).

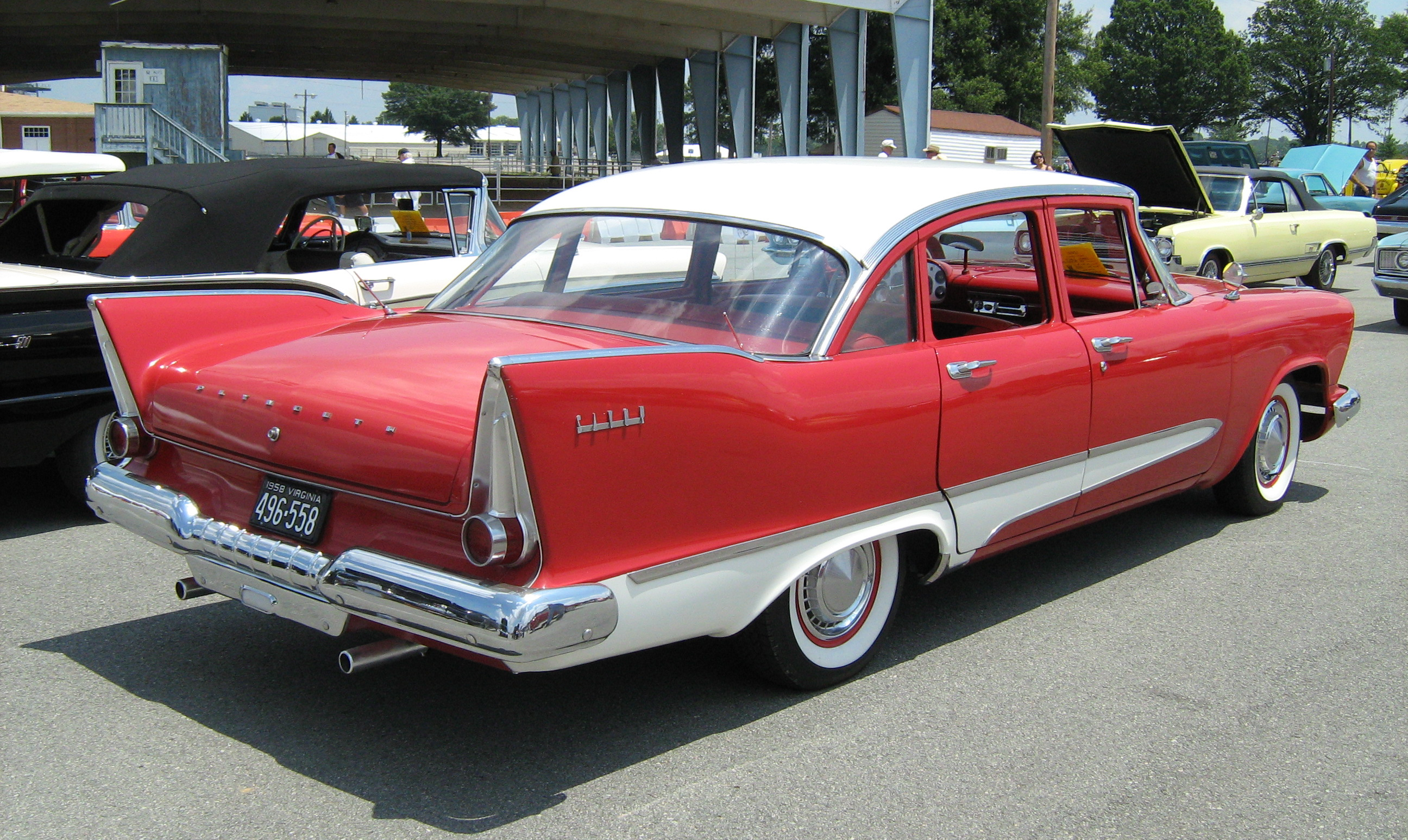
1958 Plymouth Savoy 4-door Sedan

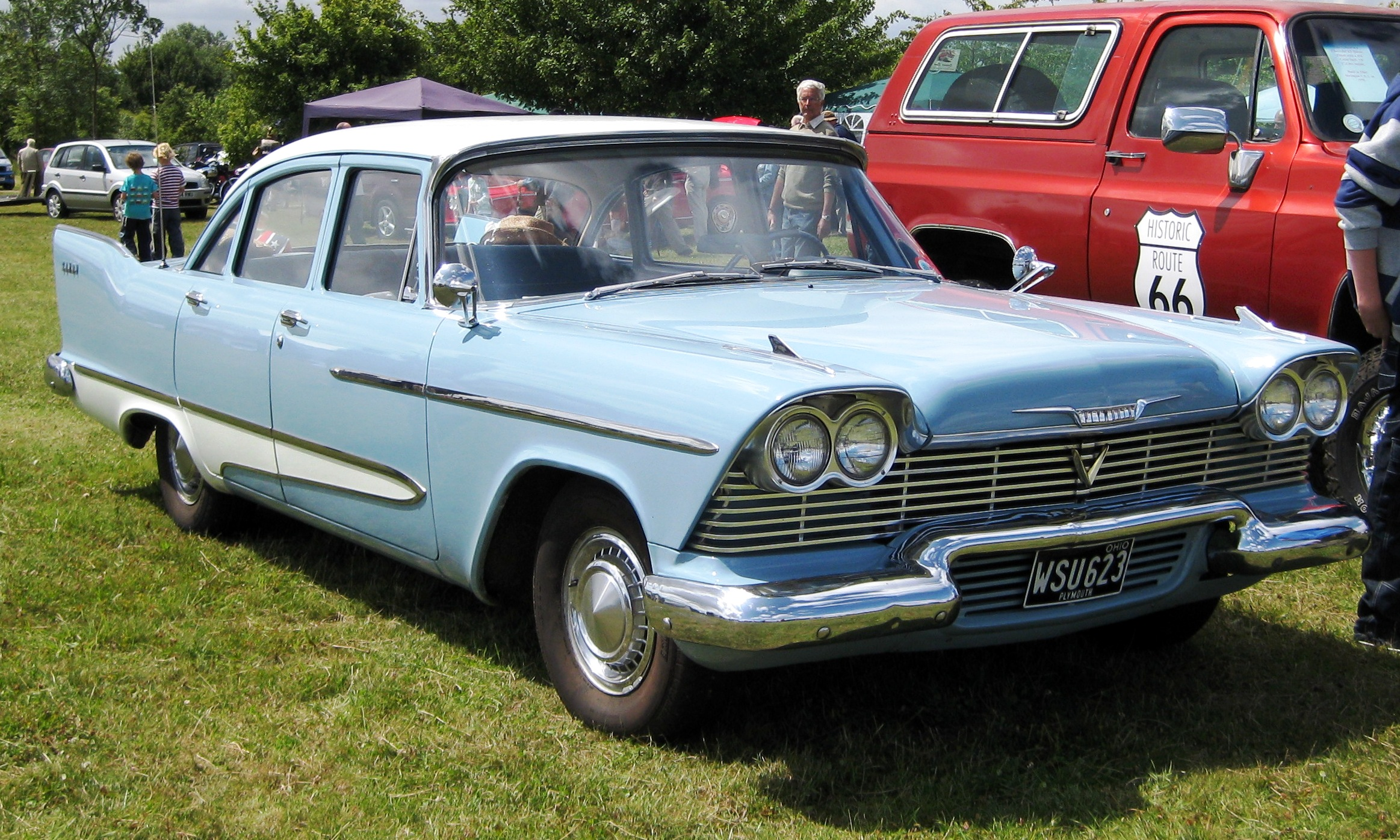
1958 Plymouth Savoy 4-door Sedan

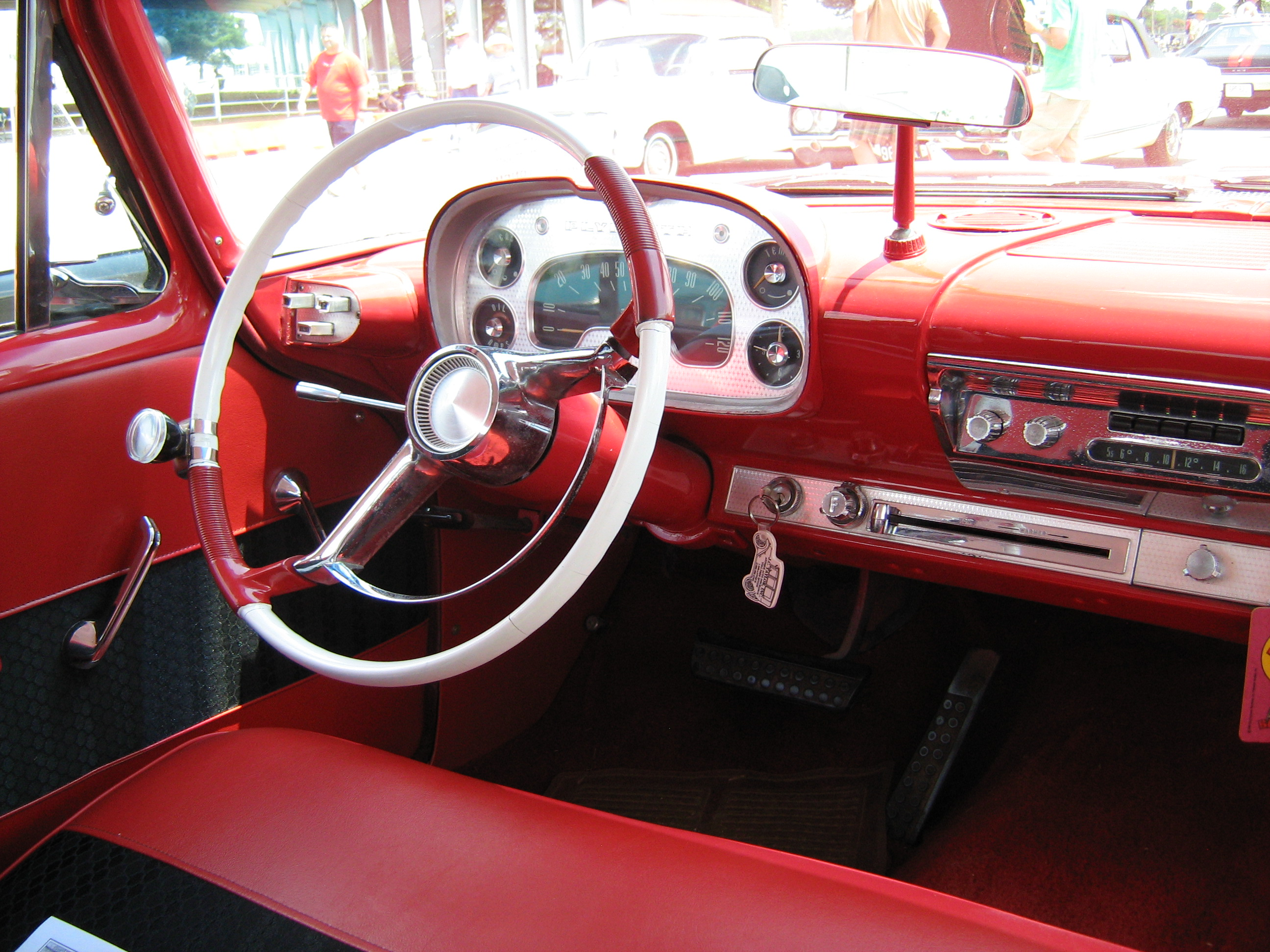
1958 Plymouth Savoy 4-door Sedan interior

== 1960–1961 ==
Fourth generation
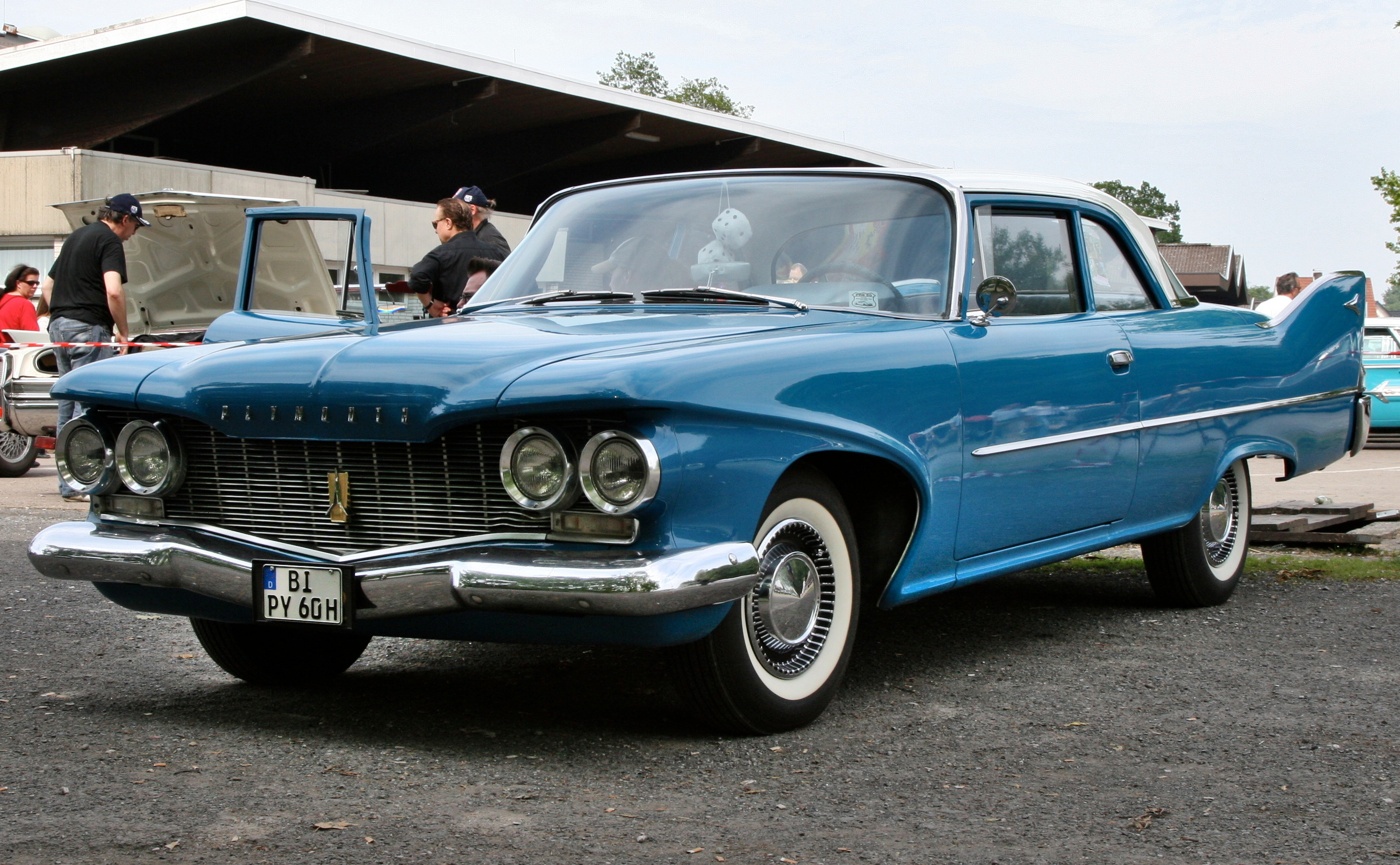
- 1960 Plymouth Savoy 2-door Sedan

Overview
- Also called: Dodge Savoy (Mexico)
- Model years: 1960–1961

Body and chassis
- Body style: 2-door coupe 2-door hardtop 4-door sedan 4-door hardtop 4-door station wagon

Powertrain
- Engine: 230.2 cu in (3.8 L) I6; 241 cu in (3.9 L) V8; 260 cu in (4.3 L) V8; 273 cu in (4.5 L) V8; 318 cu in (5.2 L) V8
- Transmission: 2-speed automatic 3-speed manual 3-speed automatic

Dimensions
- Wheelbase: 118.0 in (2,997 mm)

Plymouth models were restyled in 1960. The styling for 1961 was a year "most beholders would agree...it was hit with the ugly stick". This was because of the odd chromed "eyelashes" on the front.

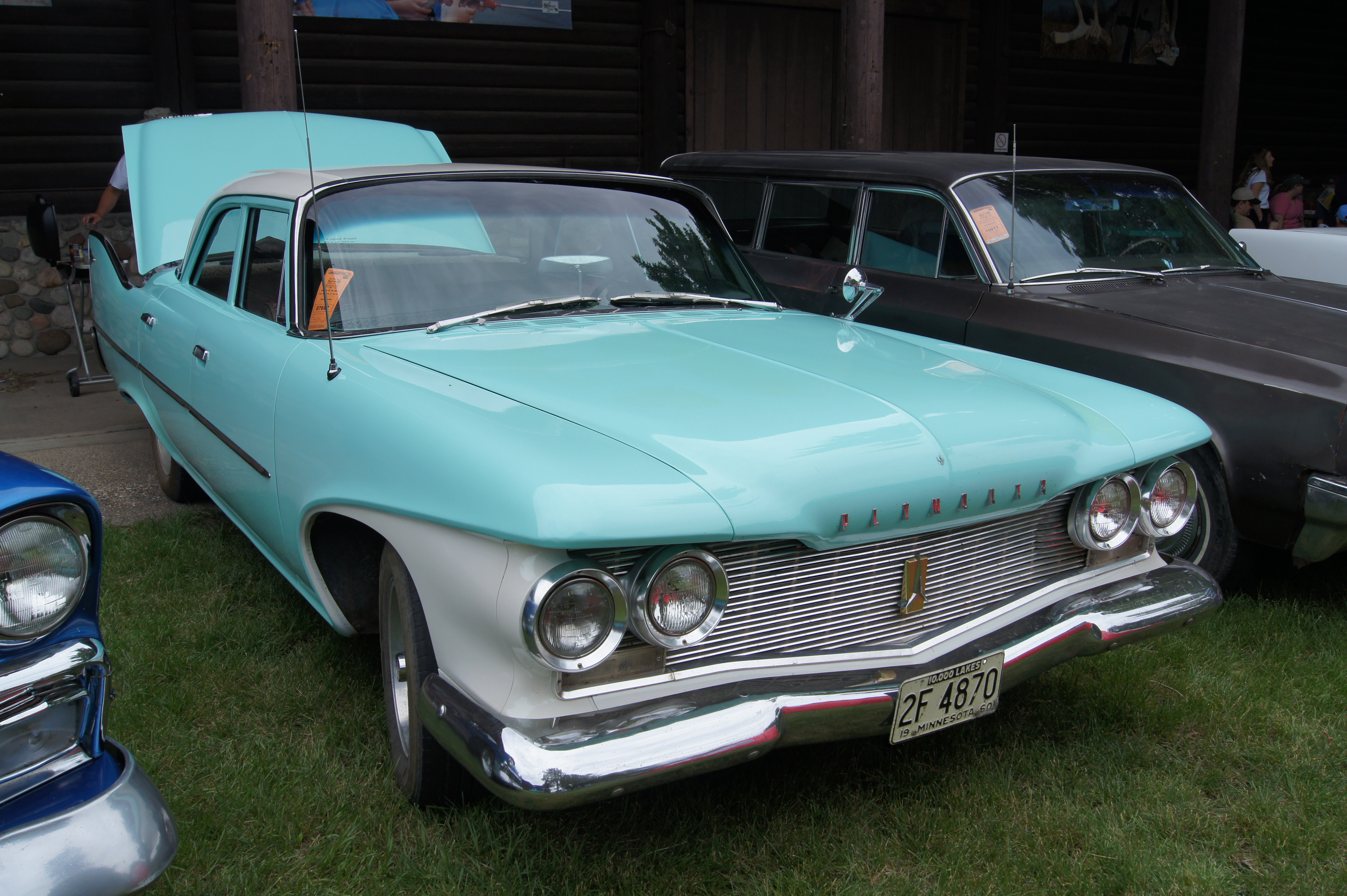
1960 Plymouth Savoy 4-door Sedan

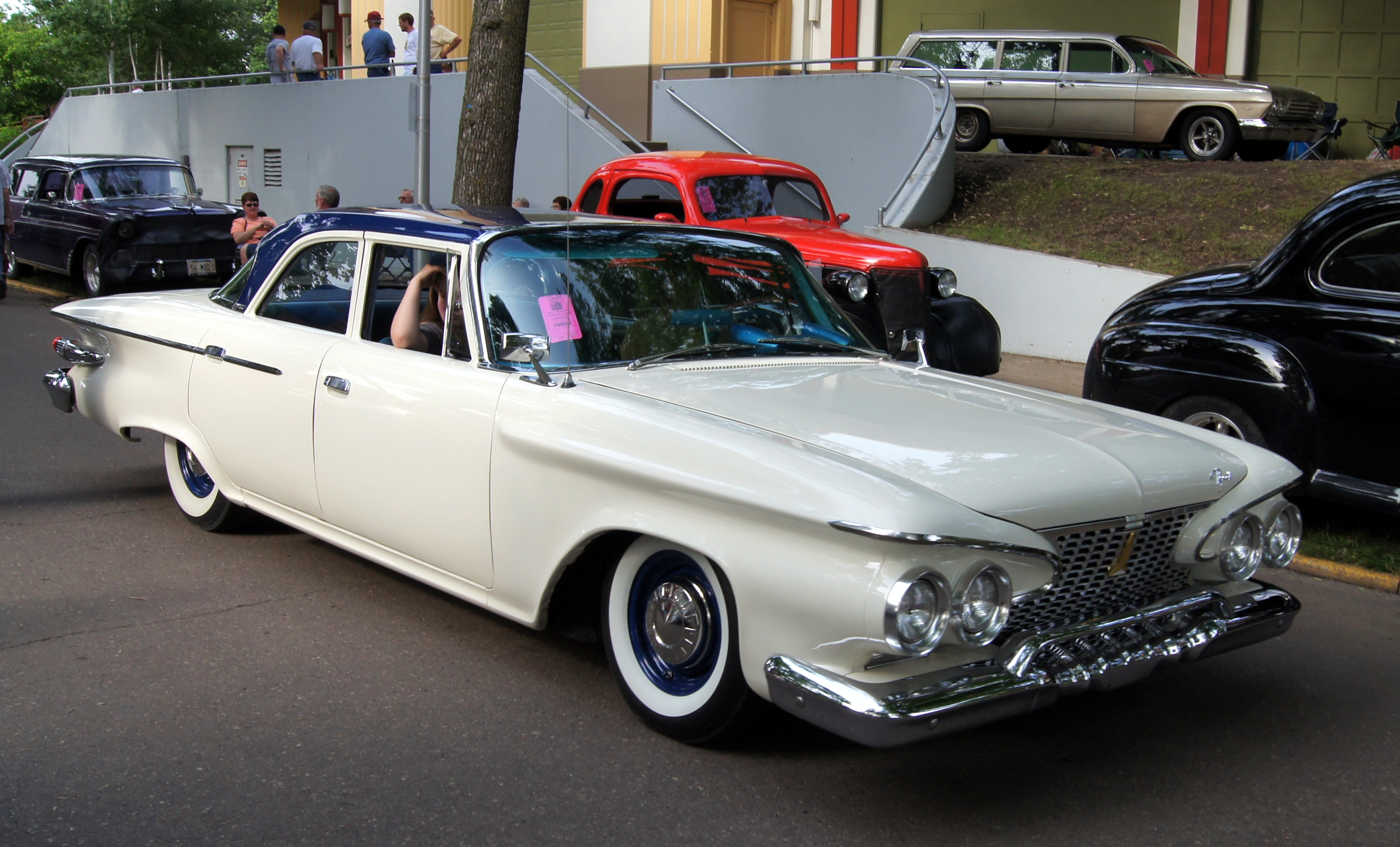
1961 Plymouth Savoy 4-door Sedan

== 1962–1964 ==
Fifth generation
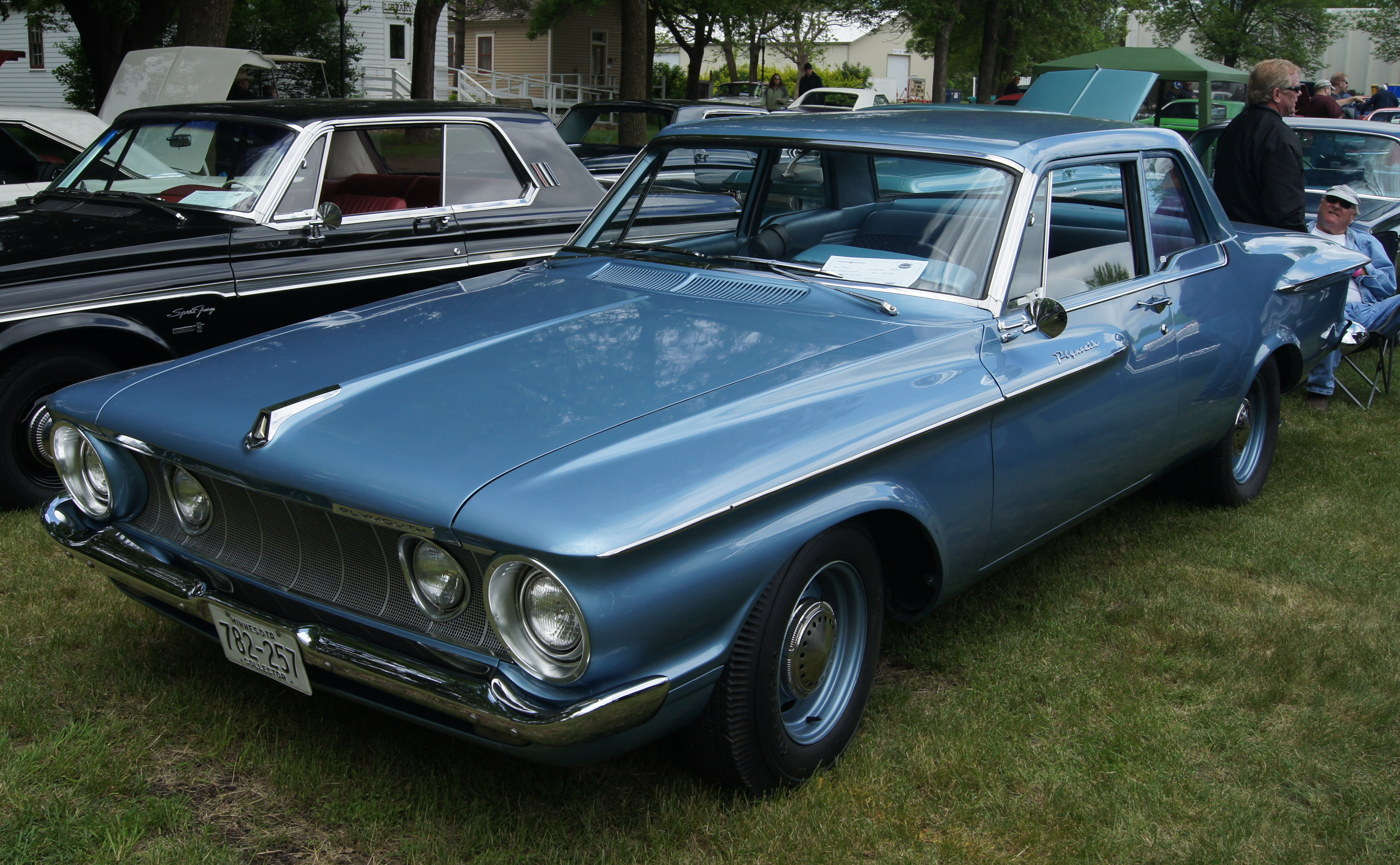
- 1962 Plymouth Savoy 2-door Sedan

Overview
- Model years: 1962–1964

Body and chassis
- Body style: 2-door coupe 4-door sedan 4-door wagon
- Platform: B-body

Powertrain
- Engine: 225 cu in (3.7 L) Economy 6 I6; 318 cu in (5.2 L) Fury V-800 V8; 361 cu in (5.9 L) Commando V8; 383 cu in (6.3 L) Golden Commando V8; 413 cu in (6.8 L) Max Wedge V8; 426 cu in (7.0 L) Max Wedge V8
- Transmission: 3-speed manual 3-speed automatic

Dimensions
- Wheelbase: 116.0 in (2,946 mm)
- Length: 202.0 in (5,131 mm); 210.0 in (5,334 mm) (Wagon)

New for 1962, the redesigned Savoy lineup started with the 225-cubic-inch (3.7 L) Economy 6 engine, producing 145 hp (108 kW). Three optional V8 engines were available initially: The Fury V-800 and the Sport Fury V-800 both displace 318-cubic-inch (5.2 L), with either a two-barrel or a four-barrel carburettor. The Fury produces 230 hp (172 kW) while the Sport Fury has 260 hp (194 kW). The top engine was the 361-cubic-inch (5.9 L) Golden Commando, producing 305 hp (227 kW). Later in the year, Plymouth added an optional 383 V8 with twin, four-barrel carburettors and 335 hp (250 kW), followed by the Super Stock "Max Wedge", raised block 413-cubic-inch (6.8 L) V8. Maximum power is 410 or 420 hp (306 or 313 kW), depending on compression ratio. Only 289 examples were built. Sold with the intent of being a competition car only, the 413 was supplanted by the 426 Wedge engine for 1963 and 1964; power increased to 415 or 425 hp (309 or 317 kW).

Plymouth discontinued the Savoy nameplate at the end of the 1964 model year, except in Canada, where it continued through 1965. In 1965, the entry-level full-size Plymouth model in the U.S. was the Fury I; in Canada, it was called the Savoy while the top-level models were named Fury II and Fury III.

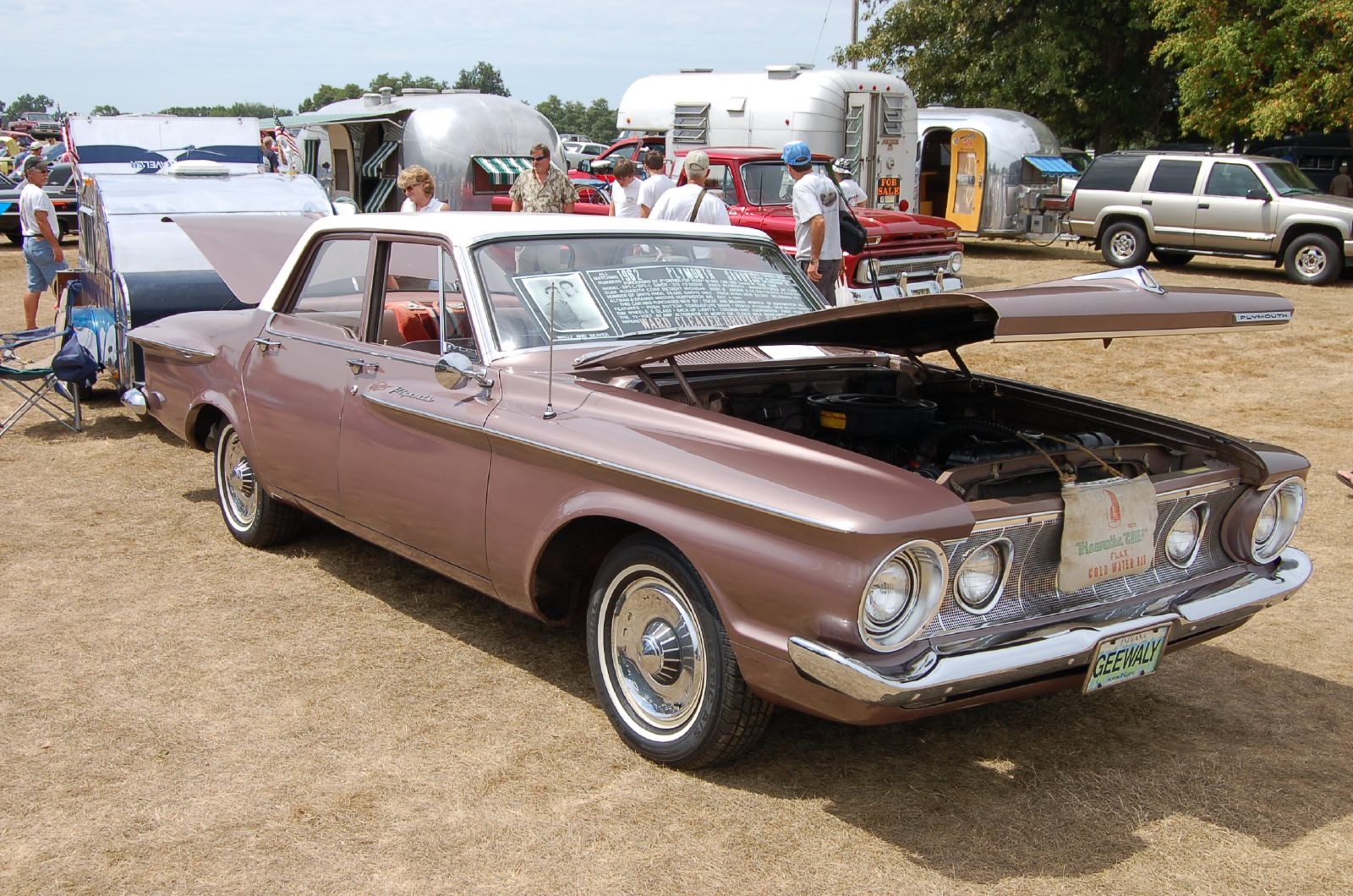
1962 Plymouth Savoy 4-door Sedan

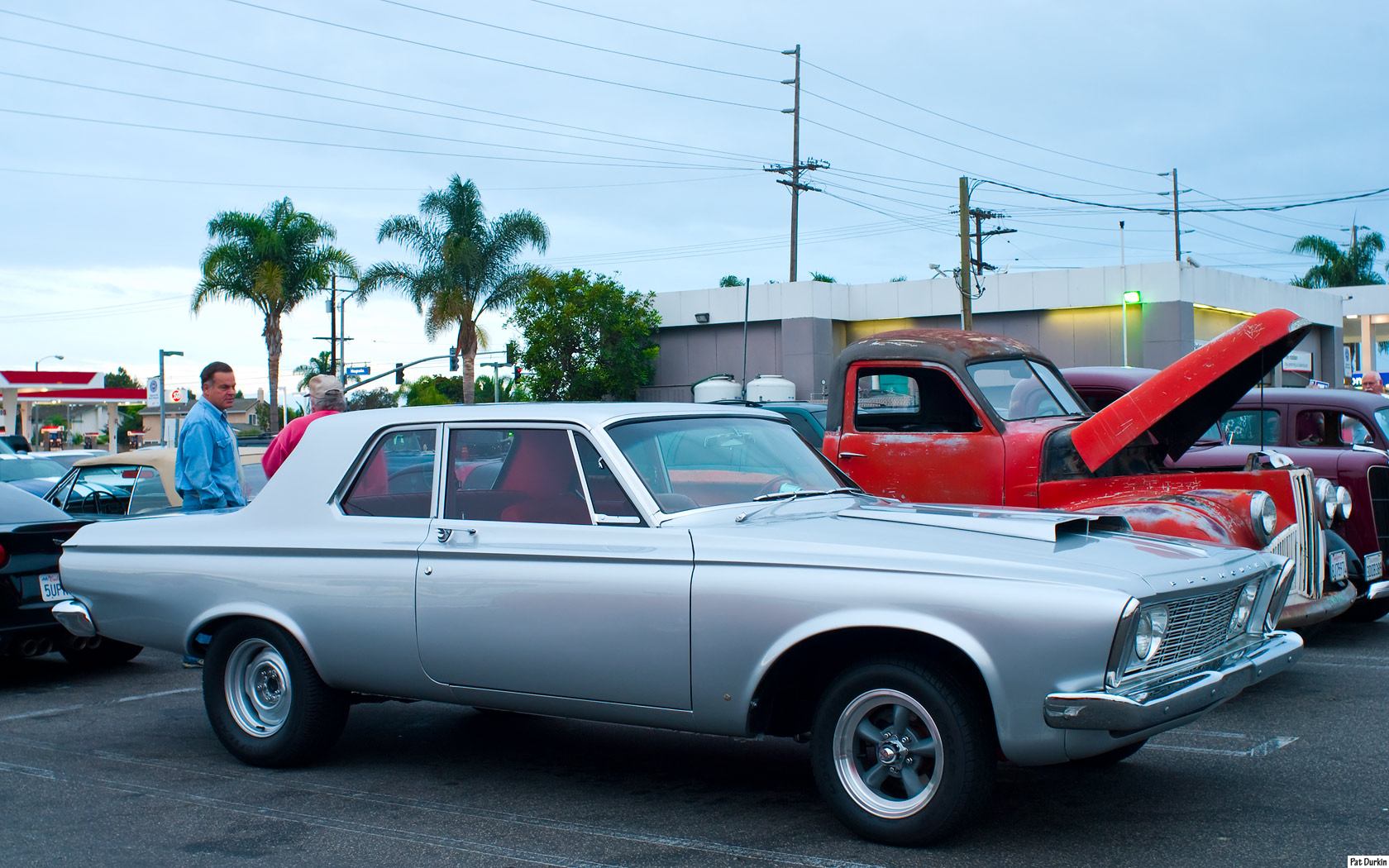
1963 Plymouth Savoy 2-door Sedan

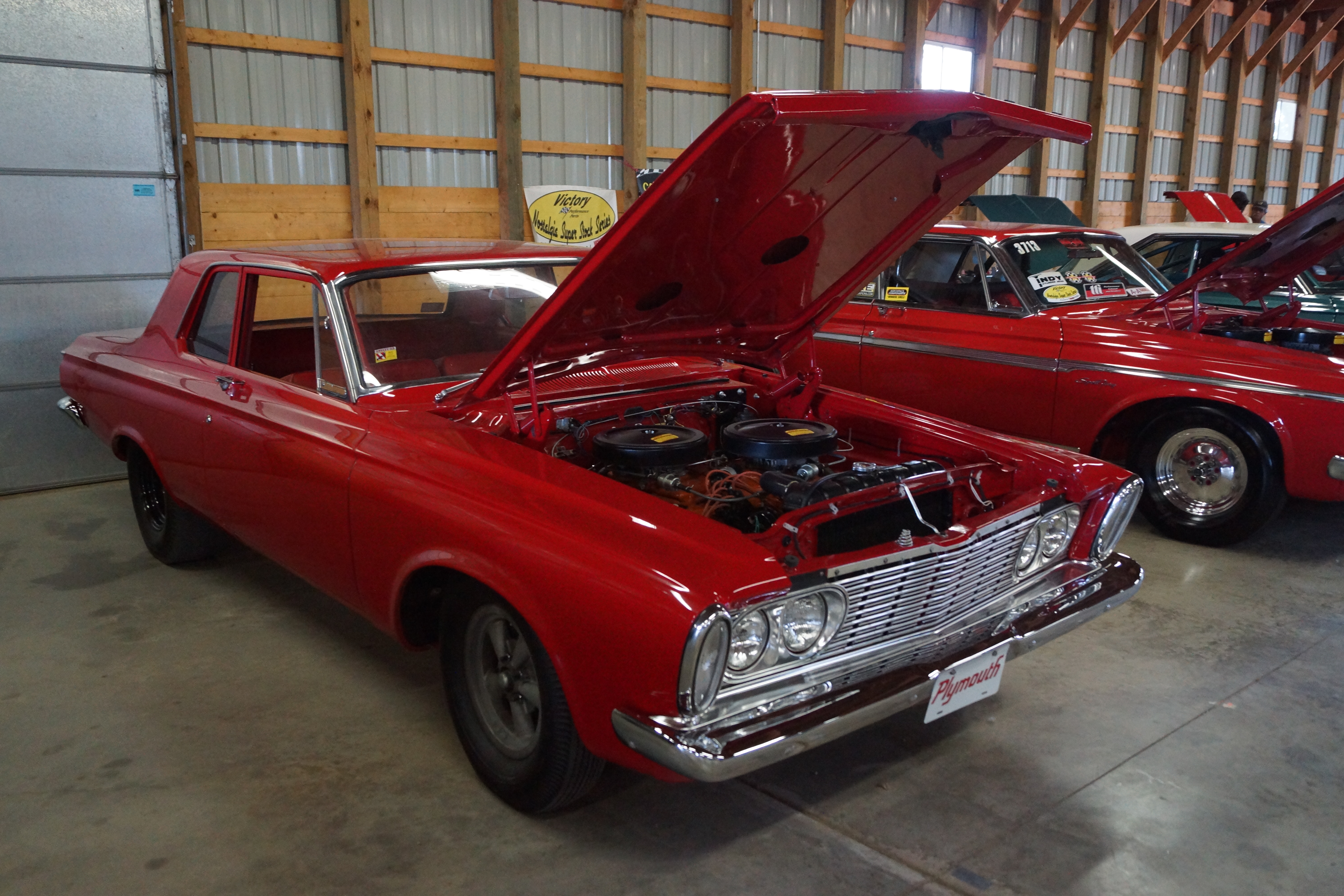
1963 Plymouth Savoy 2-door Sedan with Max Wedge engine option.

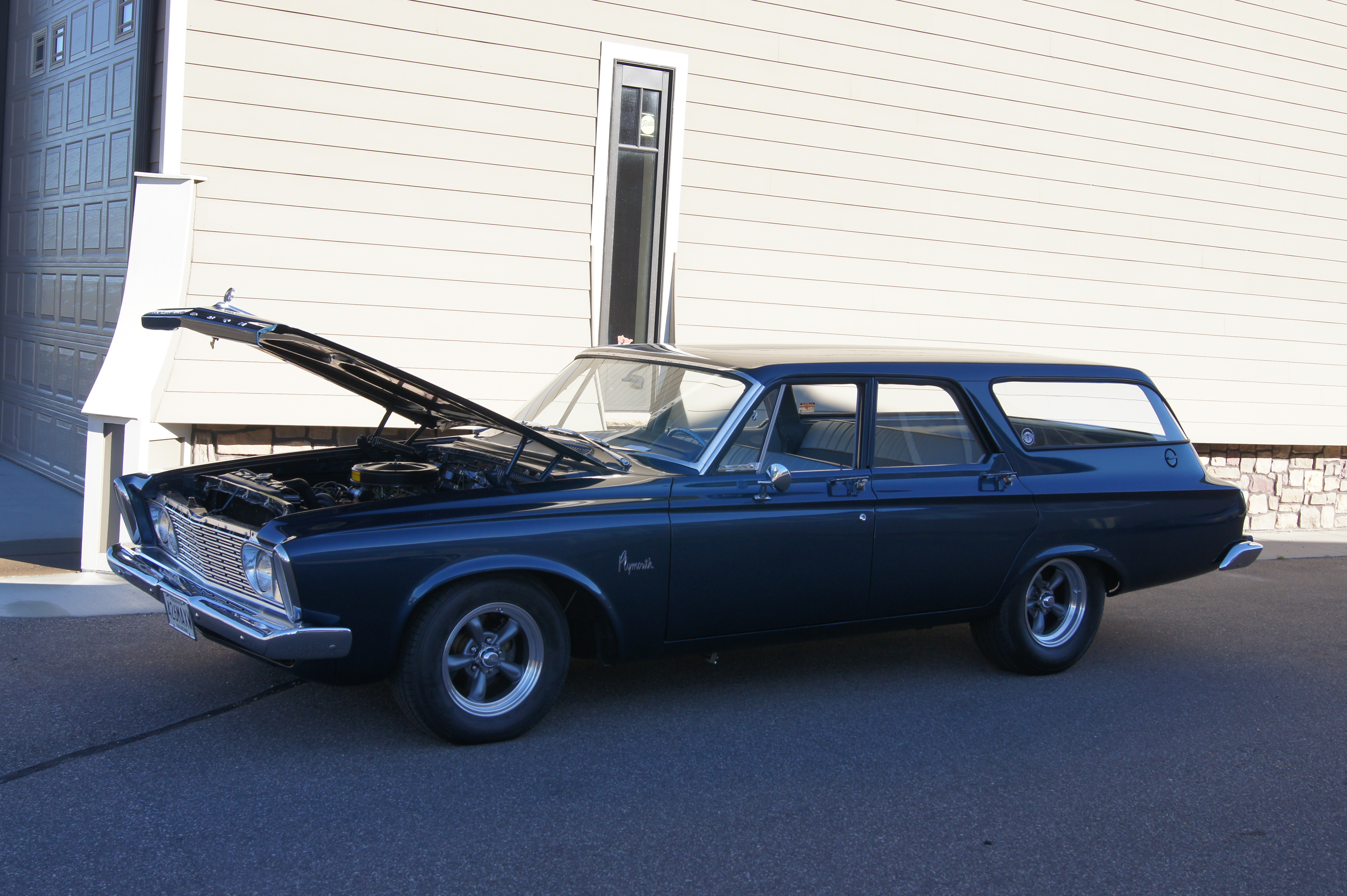
1963 Plymouth Savoy 4-Door Station Wagon

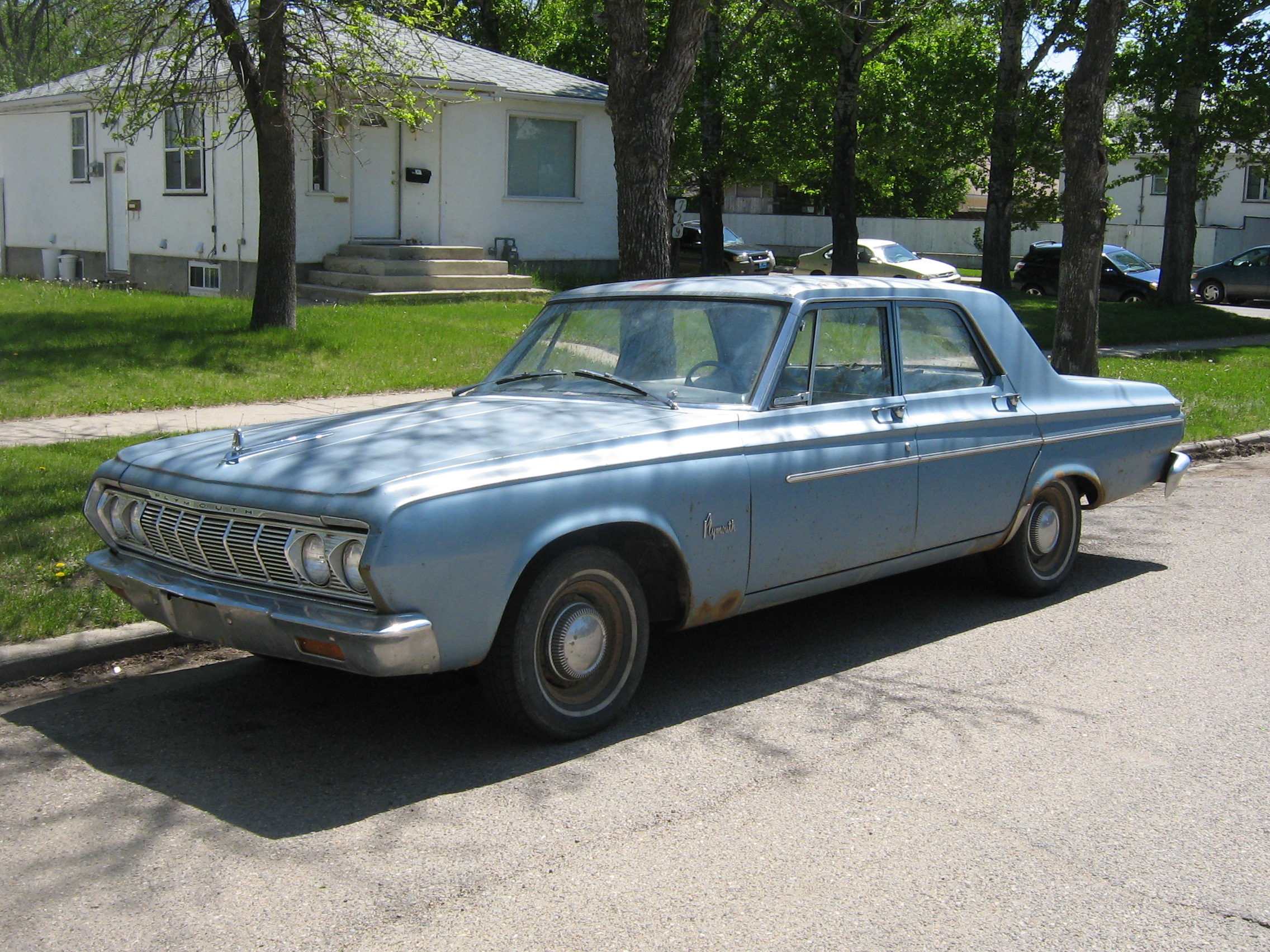
1964 Plymouth Savoy Four-Door Sedan

== Other markets ==
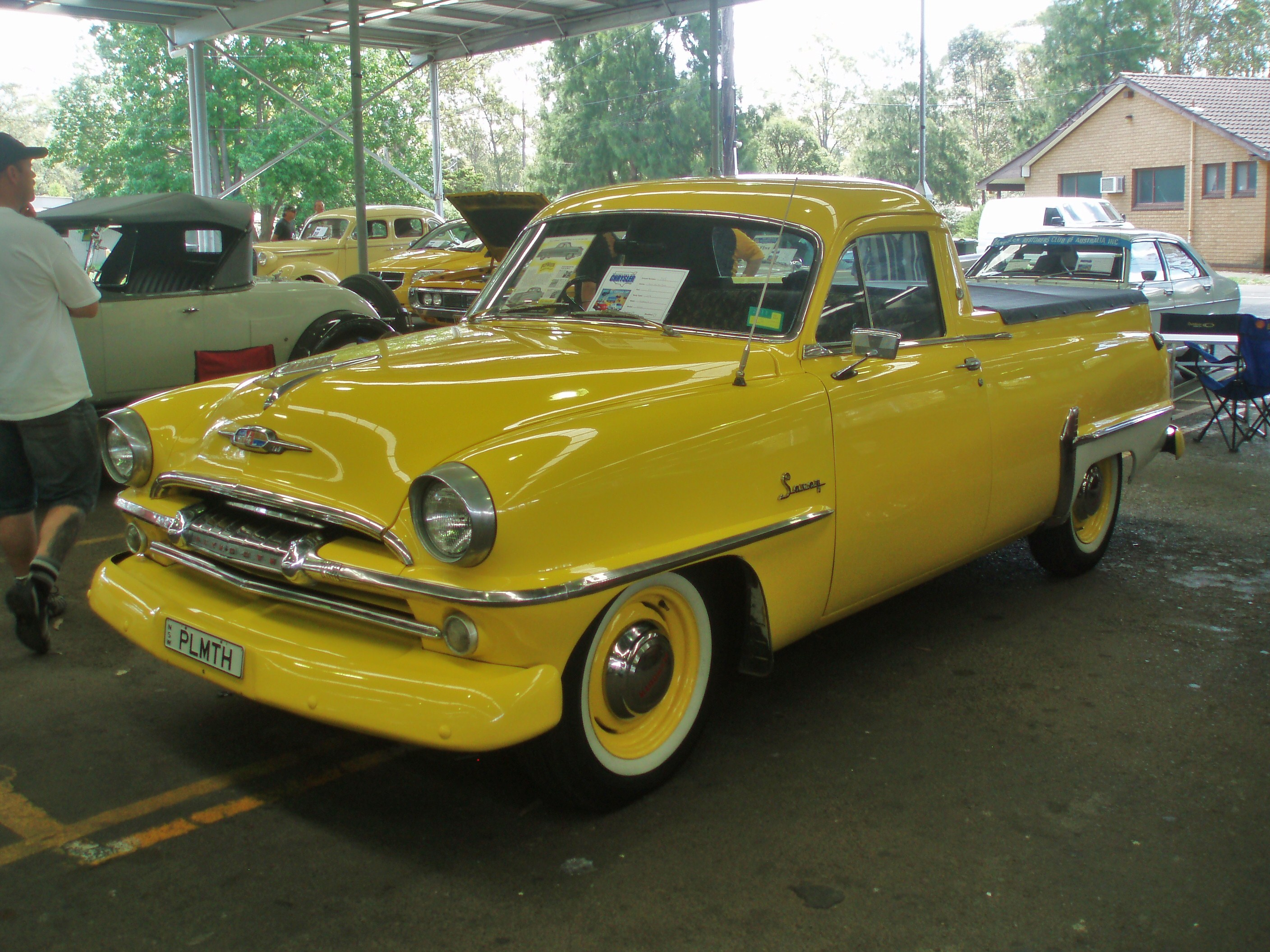
Australian-developed 1956 Plymouth Savoy Coupé Utility

- The Plymouth Savoy and the Dodge Kingsway were also assembled in India by Premier Automobiles Limited in Kurla, Bombay.
- In Mexico the Savoy was assembly by Automex between 1960 and 1961, rebadged as a Dodge. The plant was located in Lago Alberto, Mexico City.
- Chrysler Australia produced the P25 series Plymouth Savoy from 1954 to 1957. An Australian developed coupé utility variant of the Savoy was produced from 1956 to 1958.
- Todd Industries in Petone, the assembly unit of New Zealand Chrysler franchised importer and distributor Todd Motors, assembled the right hand drive Savoy and its "Plodge" Plymouth/Dodge siblings from CKD kits imported from Canada. Canadian cars were preferred to US-built ones, as a lower, "preferential" import duty rate applied to British Commonwealth products. Cars sold under the three brands were all based on the contemporary, comparable Plymouth models but nose and tail styling varied, as did engine availability. Dashboards were usually RHD Plymouth and typically differed in design from the LHD ones. "Plodge" assembly ended with 1963 model year models, replaced on Todd's large car line by locally built Australian AP5 Chrysler Valiant models. Dodge versions were produced under contract for Wellington-based Dominion Motors which held the retail franchise for the brand (and also for Pontiac, assembled at the nearby General Motors NZ factory).
