= Plymouth Plaza =

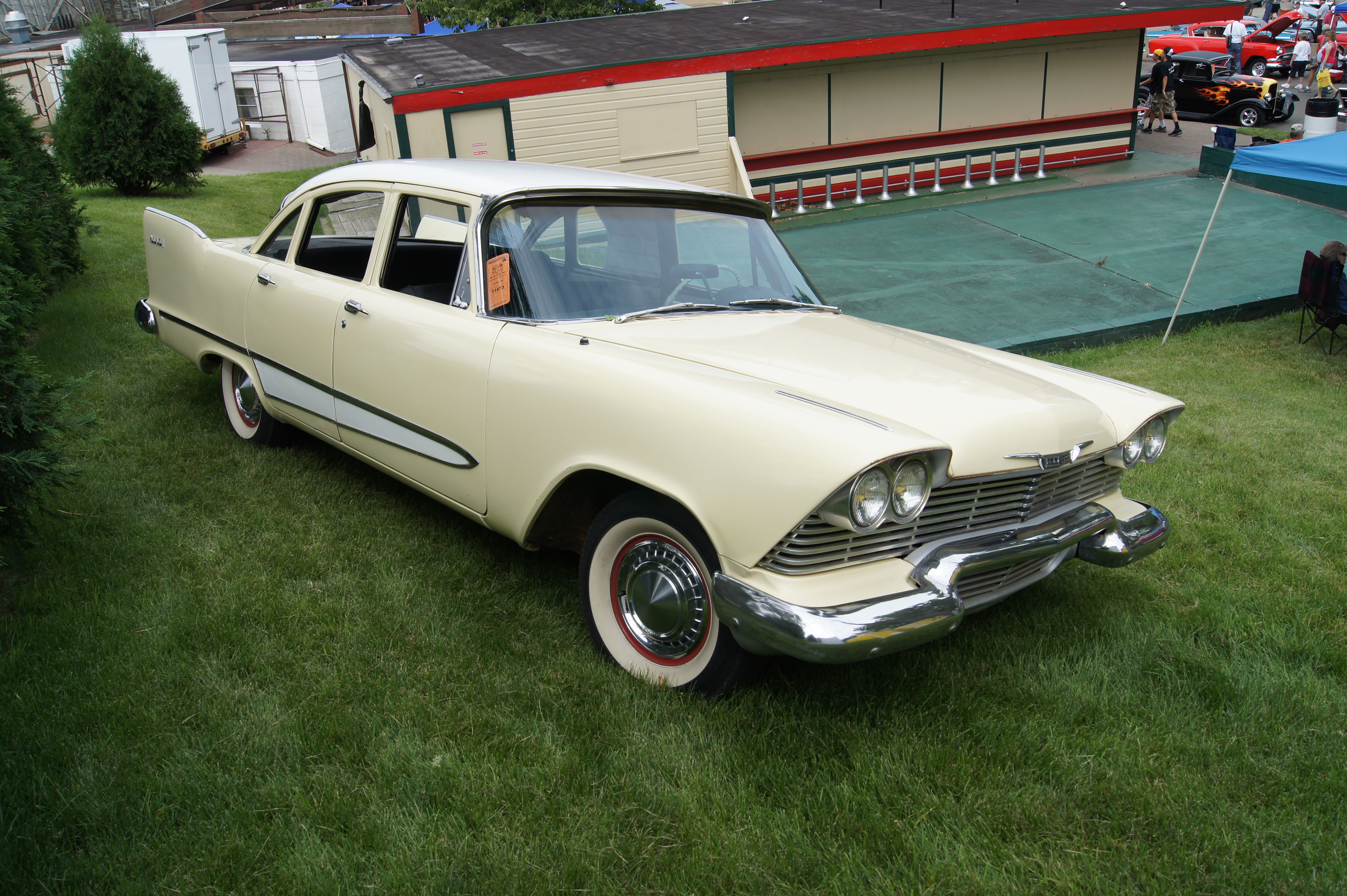
- 1958 Plymouth Plaza 4-door Sedan

Overview
- Manufacturer: Plymouth (Chrysler)
- Also called: Dodge Kingsway (Canada)
- Production: 1954–1958
- Assembly: United States: Highland Park, Michigan (Lynch Road Assembly)

Body and chassis
- Body style: 2-door sedan 4-door sedan 2-door coupé 2-door station wagon 4-door station wagon
- Layout: FR layout
- Related: Plymouth Savoy; Plymouth Belvedere; Plymouth Fury; Dodge Coronet; Dodge Royal

Powertrain
- Engine: 241 cu in (3.9 L) V8; 251 cu in (4.1 L) I6; 230 cu in (3.8 L) I6; 240 cu in (3.9 L) V8; 260 cu in (4.3 L) V8

Dimensions
- Wheelbase: 115.0 in (2,921 mm)

Chronology
- Predecessor: Plymouth Cambridge
- Successor: Plymouth Savoy (1959)

The Plymouth Plaza /ˈplɑːzə/ is an automobile which was produced by Plymouth from 1954 through the 1958 model years.

The Plaza was Plymouth's entry-level car during those years and was priced under the Plymouth Savoy. It was offered in sedan, coupe and wagon variants. Known as Plymouth's "Price Leader", in 1958 the Plaza offered buyers the widest choice of options to date. Options formerly reserved only for higher priced lines were available on the Plaza for the first time in history. The Business Coupe, which was the least produced model of Plymouth in 1958 (1,472 units), differed from the regular 2dr Club Sedan in that the rear seat was an optional accessory. Plymouth also added a special edition to the Plaza fleet in '58.

Based on a Plaza Club Sedan, the "Silver Special" had a custom paint job with silver paint on the roof and in the Sportone inserts plus a short stainless steel spear that accented the front fenders and extended partially into the front doors. The final custom touch was on the rear fins where the Silver Special bore "Forward Look" emblems instead of the traditional "Plaza" scripts. It is isn't known how many of the 94,728 Plazas produced in 1958 were fitted with the Silver Special trim package, but they are believed to be very rare cars.

Like most models of its kind in the 1950s and 1960s, the Plaza—with its minimal trim and plain cloth-and-vinyl upholstery, and limited option choices—saw most of its appeal toward fleet buyers, such as police departments, where luxury and comfort were not primary concerns. However, the model was available to budget-conscious private consumers who wanted or needed the room of a full-sized automobile and the availability of such items as a V-8 engine and automatic transmission.

For the 1959 model year, Plymouth discontinued the Plaza and moved the Savoy name down to its entry-level model.

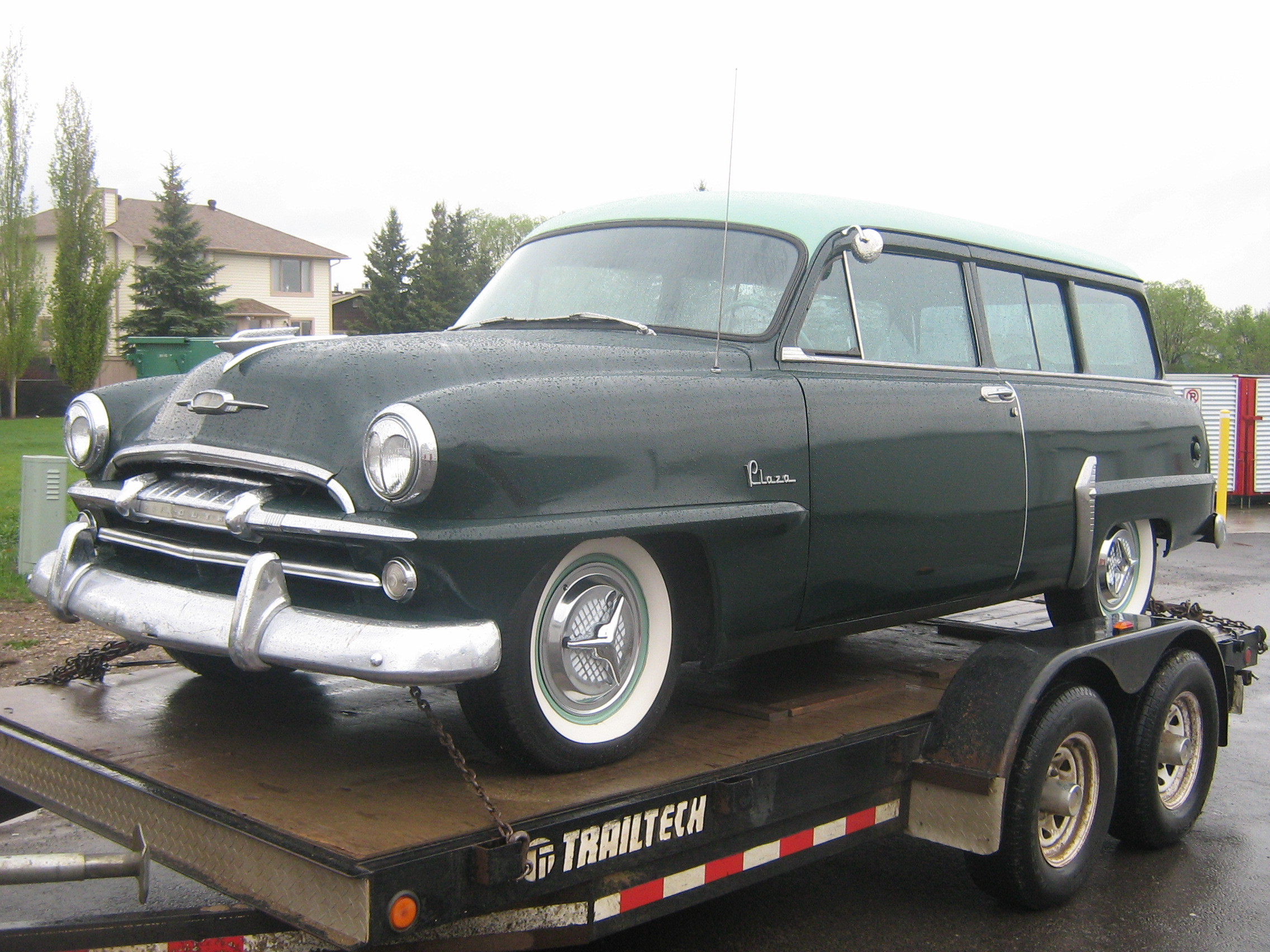
1954 Plymouth Plaza 2-door Suburban

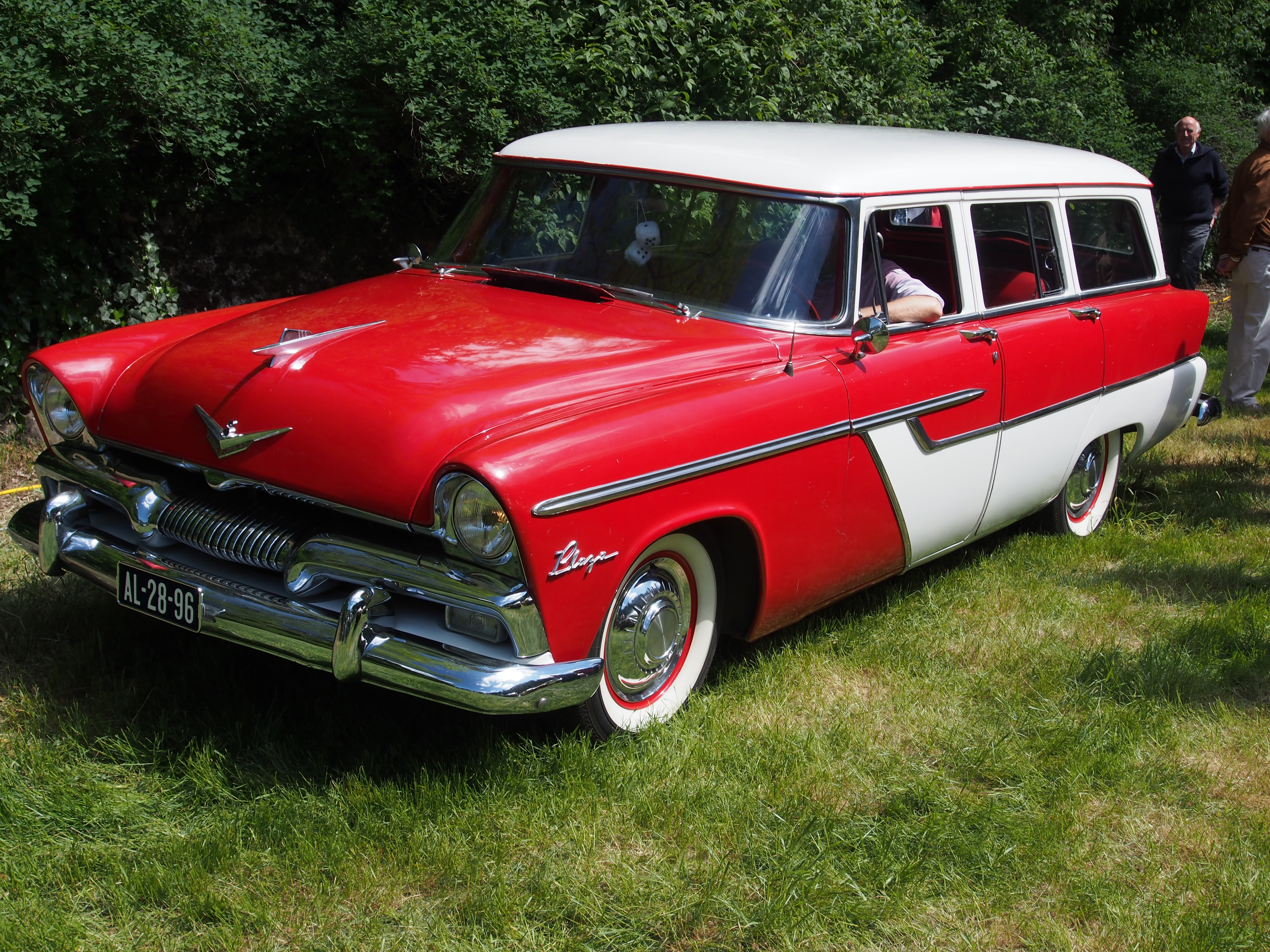
1955 Plymouth Plaza 4-door Suburban

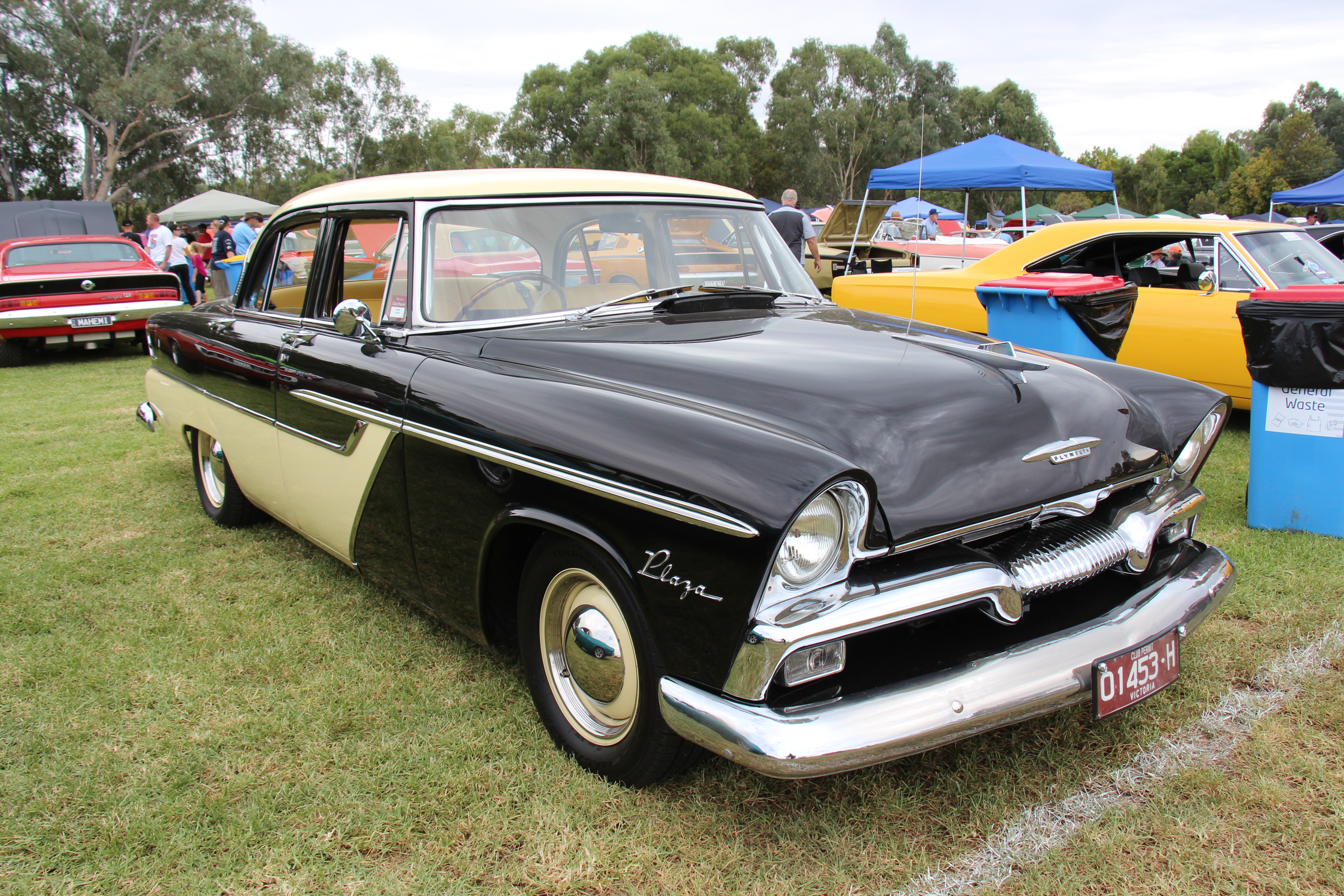
1955 Plymouth Plaza 4-door sedan

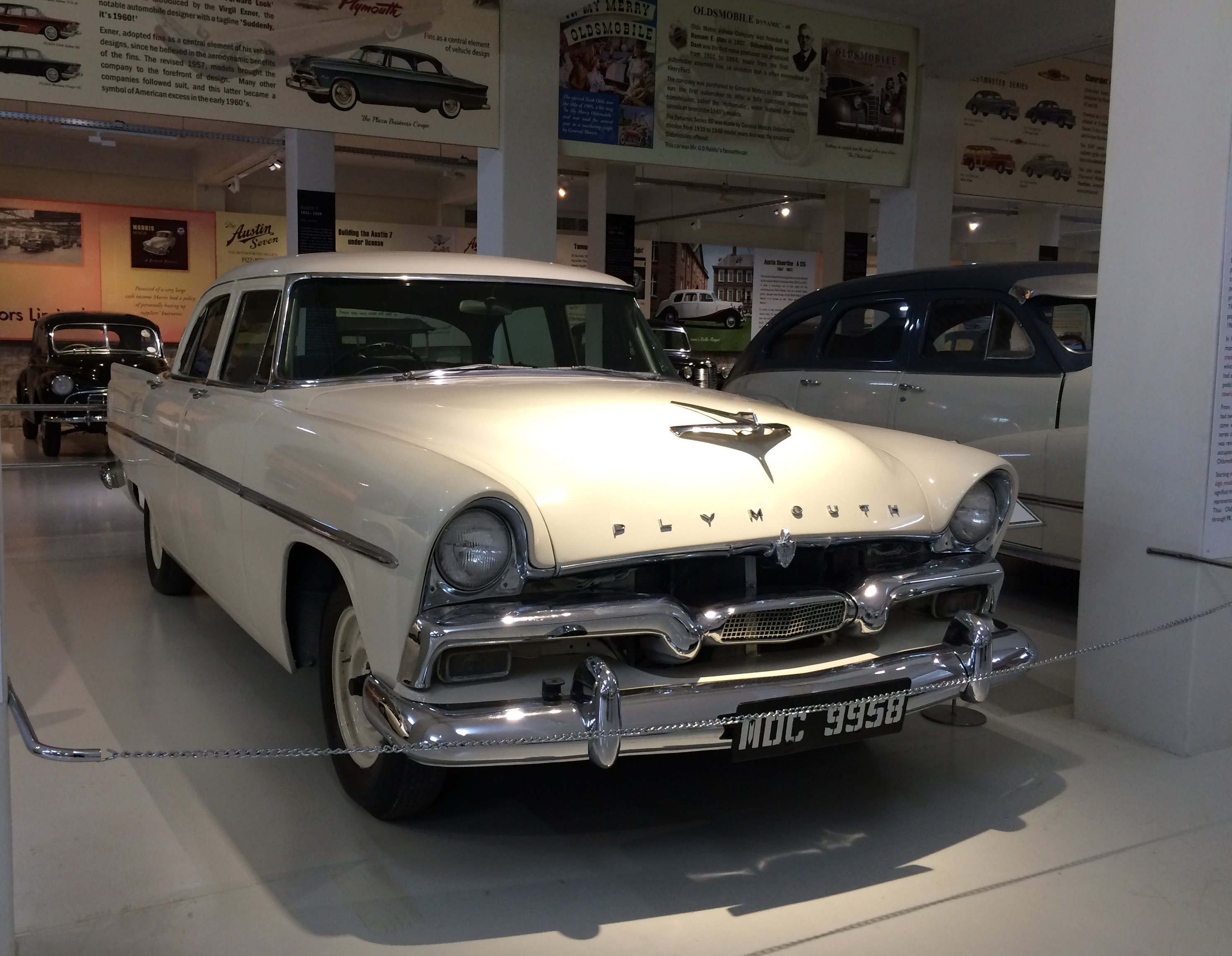
1956 Plymouth Plaza 4-door sedan

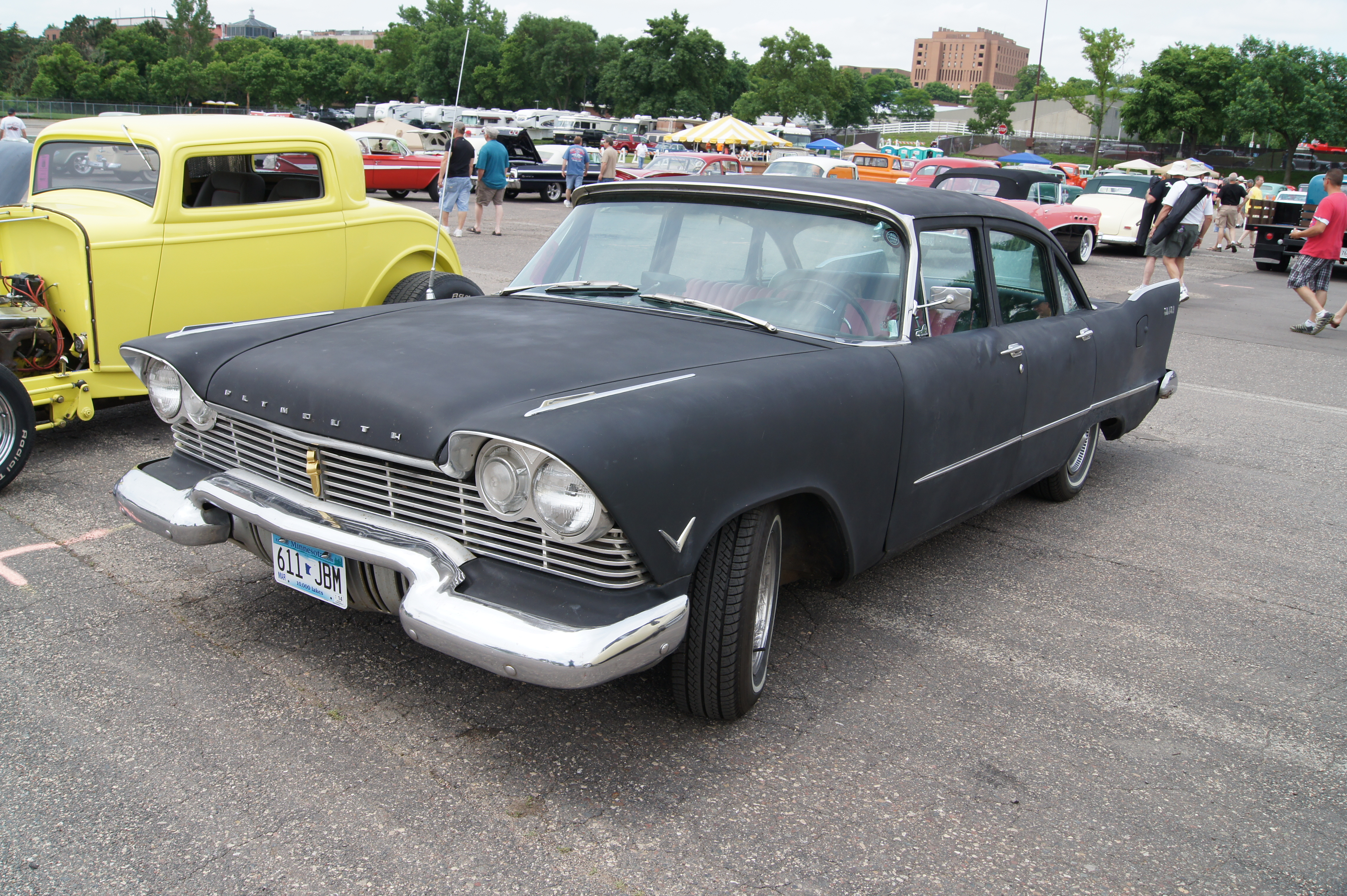
1957 Plymouth Plaza 4-door Sedan
